= Genealogia Deorum Gentilium =

Book by Giovanni Boccaccio

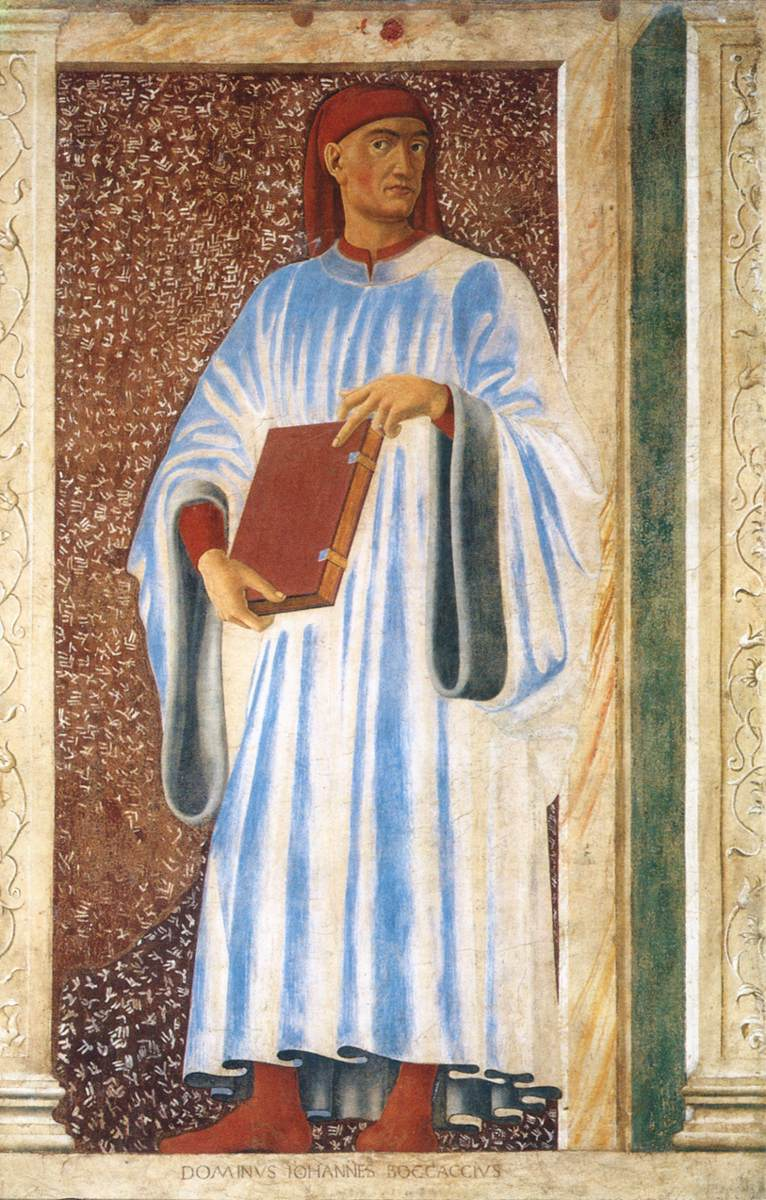
Giovanni Boccaccio

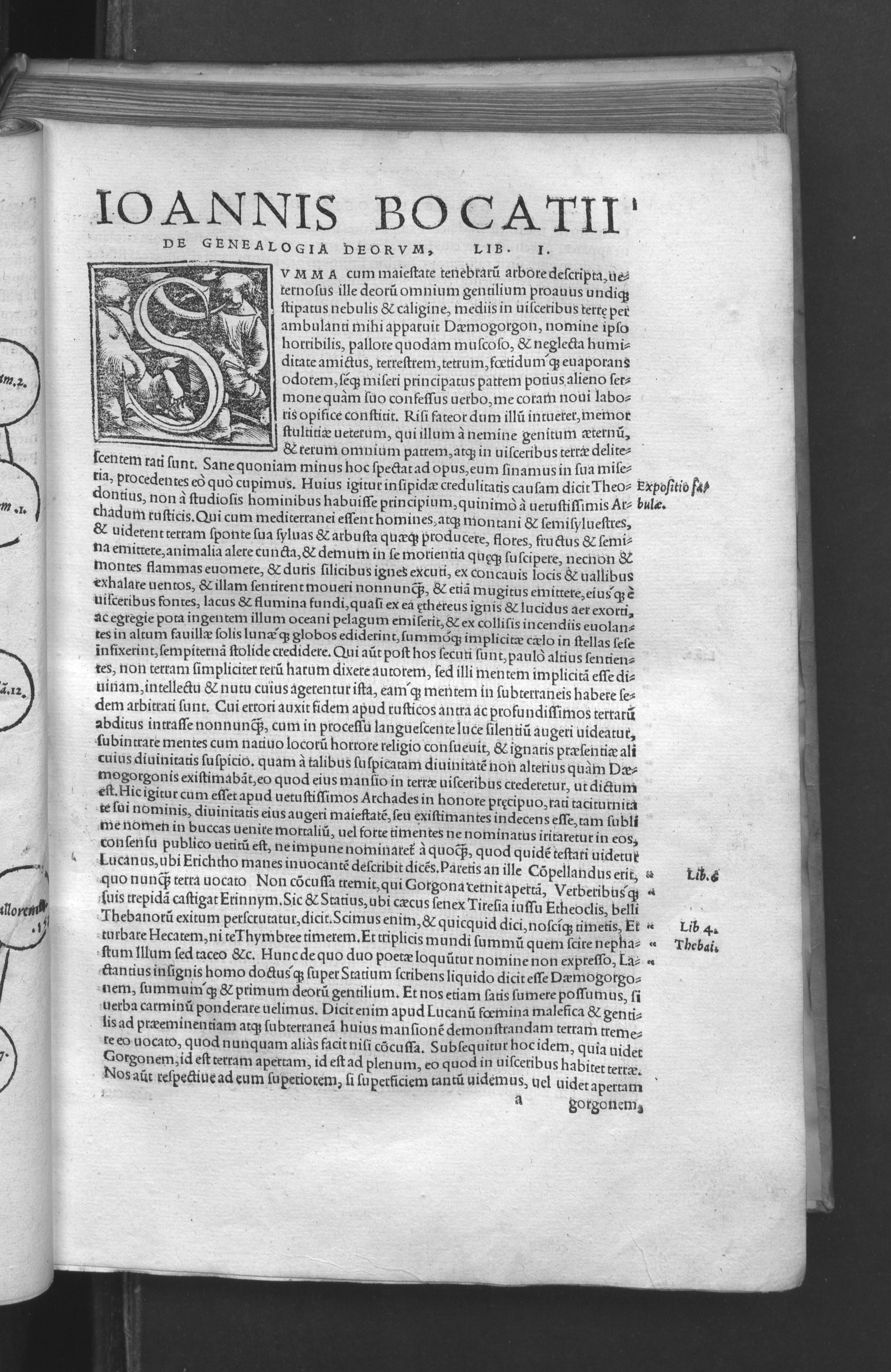
Genealogia deorum gentilium, 1532

Genealogia deorum gentilium, known in English as On the Genealogy of the Gods of the Gentiles or Genealogy of the Pagan Gods is a mythography or encyclopedic compilation of the tangled family relationships of the classical pantheons of Ancient Greece and Rome, written in Latin prose from 1360 onwards by the Italian author and poet Giovanni Boccaccio.

== History ==
Boccaccio undertook the project at the request of Hugh IV of Cyprus. The first version was completed in 1360, and he continuously corrected and revised the work until his death in 1375 so that various redactions of the works were copied in different manuscript traditions. In his lifetime and for two centuries afterwards it was considered his most important work.

== Overview ==
The work is "humanist in spirit and medieval in structure".

The full range of genealogies of the classical Gods are described in the fifteen books, drawing on the standard earlier works, especially the Liber imaginum deorum, a 12th-century treatise by the otherwise unknown Albricus (possibly Alexander Neckam), and the older so-called Vatican Mythographies. These themselves drew on the late antique Christian Fulgentius, and writers of the actual period of classical paganism, especially Ovid and Statius. Some Greek material was probably supplied by his Greek teacher Leontius Pilatus.

According to Malcolm Bull: "...Boccaccio does his best to make sense of the complex genealogy of the gods. But as he also allows for several gods of the same name, the result becomes enormously confusing. No subsequent mythographer followed his method of organizing material, yet Boccaccio's Genealogia retained its prestige and was to remain the most important mythological manual until the late sixteenth century." The next attempt at an equally comprehensive compilation on the subject of mythological genealogy would not come until 1548, when Giglio Gregorio Giraldi published his De deis gentium. The Genealogia was unkindly described by Edward Gibbon in his Decline and Fall as "a work, in that age, of stupendous erudition, and which he ostentatiously sprinkled with Greek characters and passages, to excite the wonder and applause of his more ignorant readers" and "a work which, though now forgotten, has run through thirteen or fourteen editions", although in fact there is evidence that Coleridge and Wordsworth read it together.

Boccaccio was responsible for spreading the story, which he credited to Theodontius, that Demogorgon was the ancestor of all the heathen gods — based on a misspelled scholion to Statius, which had intended to claim ancestry for Plato's Demiurge. This gave rise to a literary and iconographic tradition lasting to John Milton and Shelley. From the earliest manuscripts, some believed to be Boccaccio autographs, diagrammatic family trees are included, which are thought to be the earliest non-Biblical uses of this type of graphic, which was already used in the form of the Jesse tree in art.

== Summary ==
=== Book 1 ===
Demogorgon the first god of the pagans had 9 children: Litigius, Pan, The Moirae, Polus, Phanes, Terra and Erebus. Terra had 5 children by herself, Fama, Antaeus, Nyx, Tages and Tartarus. With her uncle Erebus Nox had 21 children culminating in Aether and Dies. Mors, Somnus and Fraus are other notable children of Erebus and Nox.

=== Book 2 ===
Aether and Dies have 2 children, Jupiter I and Caelus. The second book deals with the former while the third book deals with the latter. Jupiter I has 13 children: Minerva I, Sol I, Apis, Diana I, Mercury I Tritopatreus, Ebuleus, Dionysus I, the last three called the Ariarches were the children of this first Jupiter and his own daughter Proserpina I, his child with Ceres I. Proserpina I was married to her brother Liber Pater and had Mercury II, who had Cupid I with his aunt Diana I. He also bore Autolycus on Chione daughter of Daedalion. Autolycus fathered Sinon I a notorious thief like his father, who bore Anticleia mother of Odysseus and Aesimus who was the father of Sinon I. With Lysithoe Jupiter I sired Hercules I who fought Apollo for the Delphic Tripod. On an unknown woman he sired Scythes ancestor of the Scythians and on Io he sired Epaphus.Epaphus with his wife Memphis or Cassiopeia had two children Libya and Belus. Belus sired Danaus, Aegyptus and Agenor. Danaus sired 50 daughters called the Danaids which included Amymone, Debona who bore Electra to Atlas and Hypermnestra. Aegyptus had 50 sons who were killed by their wives the Danaids, Lynceus was spared and with Hypermnestra sired Abas King of Argos, who was the father of Acrisius, Proetus and Iasius. The former sired Danae who was the mother of Perseus. Proetus sired Merena, whilst Iasius fathered Atalanta, Amphion who bore Chloris wife of Neleus and Talaus. Talaus was the father of Adrastus, Eriphyle and Phlegeus. Adrastus was the father of Deipyle and Argia. Agenor was the father of Taygeta, Europa, Polydorus, Cilix, Phoenix, Cadmus and Labdacus. Cillix bore two insignificant sons and Pygmalion who had a son named Paphos with his wife Galatea, Paphos was the father of Cinyras who with his daughter Myrrha sired Adonis. Phoenix sired Palestinus and Belus giving the priesthood to the former and the kingdom for the latter. Palestinus bore Sichaeus who married Dido daughter of Belus and sister to Anna and Pygmalion. Cadmus fathered Semele, Ino, Agave and Autonoë. Labdacus was the father of Laius who with Jocasta were the parents of Oedipus, who with his mother became the father of Polyneices, Eteocles, Antigone and Ismene. With Argia, Polyneices became father of Thersander.

=== Book 3 ===
Caelus with his sister Vesta I had 12 children. Ops, Tethys, Ceres I, Vulcan I, Mercury III, Venus the Greater and Venus II, Toxius, Titan, Jupiter II, Oceanus and Saturn. Only the first 8 will be featured in this book, Titan would have book 4, Jupiter II would have books 5 and 6, Oceanus would have book 7 whilst Saturn would have the remaining books for him and his progeny. From the tears of Ceres I, comes the river Acheron who is the father of Styx, The Furies, Ascalaphus and with Styx he was the father of Victoria who was the mother of Honor who with Veneratis was the father of Majestas. Styx was the mother of Cocytus who bore Phlegethon who bore Lethe. Vulcan I was the father of Apollo I with Minerva III, Mercury III with Venus I was the father of Hermaphroditus and Venus II was the mother of Cupid II.

=== Book 4 ===
Titan had many offspring with his wife Terra but only fourteen are named here. Hyperion was the eldest child of Titan and had two children with his wife Theia, Sol II and Luna. Sol II is the Sol described in Roman Mythology. He is confused with Apollo as he is the father of Miletus the father of Caunus and Byblis. With a goddess called Cronia he was the father of the Horae and a race of gigantic goddesses known as Aeons. With Naeira he was the father of Lampetia and Phaetusa and with Perse he was the father of Circe, Dirce, Pasiphae, Angitia and Aeetes. Aeetes was the father of Medea, Absyrtus and Chalciope. With Aer, Luna gave birth to the dew. Briareus despite being listed as a Titan here is actually a member of the Hecatoncheires. Coeus and Phoebe were the parents of Latona and Asteria. Typhon whom despite having many monstrous progeny with Echidna, such as Cerberus and the Hydra has only two, some obscure Cypriot figure named Aeos the founder of Paphos and the Chimera. The text calls him a king of Cilicia and murderer of his brother Osiris, here identifying him with Set. Aegaeon despite being another name for Briareus is here listed as the admiral of the Titans, alongside Enceladus. Iapetus with the Oceanid Clymene or Asia was the father of Hesperus father of the Hesperides, Atlas, Prometheus and Epimetheus. Atlas sired the Hyades and Hyas on Aethra and the Pleiades on Pleione alongside Calypso and Cyllene mother of Mercury I. Prometheus was not only the father of Deucalion and Isis, but also the creator of Pandora who had Pyrrha with Epimetheus. With Pyrrha, Deucalion became the father of Hellen, Psytacus, Phentratus and Dionysus II a contemporary of Moses. Astraeus and Aurora who is mentioned earlier, were the parents of Astraea and the Winds. Extra detail is put into Boreas and his sons Calais and Zetes and daughter Harpalyce wife of Phineus, alongside Zephyrus. Instead of having Zephyrus being the jealous lover of Hyacinthus, Boccaccio says it was Boreas. Aloeus is considered to be one of the Titans due to his stepsons Otus and Ephialtes being giants. Pallas is here conflated with the giant of the same name and father of Minerva II who killed him by flaying when he tried to rape her. We also learn that Porphyrion was conjoined to a giant named Runcus, and they were twice as strong than Atlas. Lycaon was also listed as one of the Titans by Boccaccio and is mentioned as father of Callisto. This book ends with the Gigantes and a detailed account mentioning the Gigantomachia, Nephilim which included Nimrod and Goliath, and a giant's skeleton recently discovered in Drepani which fell to pieces when it was touched.

=== Book 5 ===
We now move onto the second Jupiter and his progeny starting with Diana II who is the chaste huntress we are familiar with, the same applies with her brother Apollo II. He was the father of Lapitha ancestress of the Lapiths, Eurynome wife of Talaus, Mopsus, Linus, Palestinus, Garamas, Branchus, Philammon, Orpheus, Aristaeus the father of Actaeon and Iolaus, Aristaeus has three brothers Nomius, Auctous and Argeus. Apollo was the father of Asclepius who was the father of Machaon who in turn bore another Asclepius. The final two children of Apollo were Psyche and Arabus. With Elara he was the father of Tityos and with Semele, he was the father of Bacchus. With Venus he was the father of Hymenaeus and with Ariadne the father of Thyoneus and Thoas, the latter the father of Hypsipyle. With Antiope he was the father of Amphion and Zethus and their children The Niobids, Itylus and Thyius respectively, they also had a brother named Calathus. Followed by the Charites, Lacedaemon father of Amyclas, father of Argulus, father of Oebalus father of Tyndareus and Icarius father of Penelope, Iphthime and Erigone. The remaining children of the second Jupiter are Tantalus Hercules II and his daughter Carthago, Minerva III whose child the first Apollo was mentioned earlier, she was also known as Athena and Bellona, Arcas, his son Ionius and his daughter Carmenta. The final child of the second Jupiter is Dardanus whose descendants are described in the next book.

=== Book 6 ===
With his sister-wife Candavia, Dardanus was the father of Ericthonius, father of Tros who was the father of Ganymede Ilus and Assaracus whom we would talk about later. Ilus would be the father of Laomedon who in turn was the father of Antigone, Hesione, Lampus, Clytion and Hicataeon, Tithonus father of Memnon and Priam. Priam had many children, the most notable being Hector, Paris and Cassandra. Laocoön is also mentioned to be a son of Priam. Paris was the father of Daphnis and Idaeus whilst Hector was the father of Astyanax. The book then covers the lineage of Assaracus, such as his son Capys, his son Anchises, his son Aeneas. And from Aeneas we get the lineage of the Latin Kings up to Rhea Silvia.

=== Book 7 ===
Book Seven deals with the progeny of Oceanus whose spouse Tethys is mentioned in book 3. Their children include Eurynome, Perse, Aethra and Pleione, wives of Atlas. Clymene whose son Phaethon will be discussed later. Triton whose gender is debated amongst scholars. Doris wife of Nereus, Proteus and his daughters Eidothea and Melantho. Oceanus sired Coryphe and Nereus, who with Doris sired the Nereids including Cymodoce, Thetis, Galatea and Arethusa. Achelous who fathered the Sirens, Inachus father of Io, Phoroneus father of Niobe and Aegialeus, and Phegeus. Peneus is brought up alongside his daughters Cyrene and Daphne who both caught Apollo's eye. The former became a queen the latter became his sacred tree. We move onto the progeny of Nilus, the great and fertile stream of Egypt. These include Minerva IV, Hercules III, Dionysus IV, Mercury IV who fathered Daphnis, Mercury V the father of Norax. The final child of Nilus is Vulcan II father of Aethiops and Sol III who with Clymene mentioned earlier became the father of Phaethon and the Heliades. The former sired Ligurus. Alpheus sired Orsilochus who fathered Diocles who fathered Crithonius and Orsilochus. Crinisus sired Acestes whilst Tiberinus fathered Chthonius, Axius sired Pelagonius who fathered Asteropius, Asopus fathered Hypseus and Aegina, Cephissus fathered Narcissus, Meander who fathered Cyane, Spercheios fathered Mnesitheus. The final two children of Oceanus and Tethys were Philyra and Sol IV.

The last two books of the work include a defence of poetry that is his latest and most extended discussion of the subject.

== Translations ==
- French: Jean Miélot 1468, produced for Philip the Good, Duke of Burgundy
- English: The first volume of a projected three-volume set titled Genealogy of the Pagan Gods, translated by Jon Solomon, was published in May 2011 by Harvard University Press under the I Tatti Renaissance Library imprint. A second volume was released in October 2017.

== Printed editions ==
The first printed edition was in Venice at the early date of 1472, of a version with some additions to the Genealogia, and other short works by Boccaccio, shortly followed by an edition of 1473 which was the first book printed in Leuven. Four further Italian incunabulum editions were published (including in 1497), and a French translation in 1498 or 1499. All survive in healthy numbers, confirming the popularity of the work, which was reprinted in many more 16th-century editions, some illustrated.
