= Hemera =

Ancient Greek goddess of the day

- Personification of day
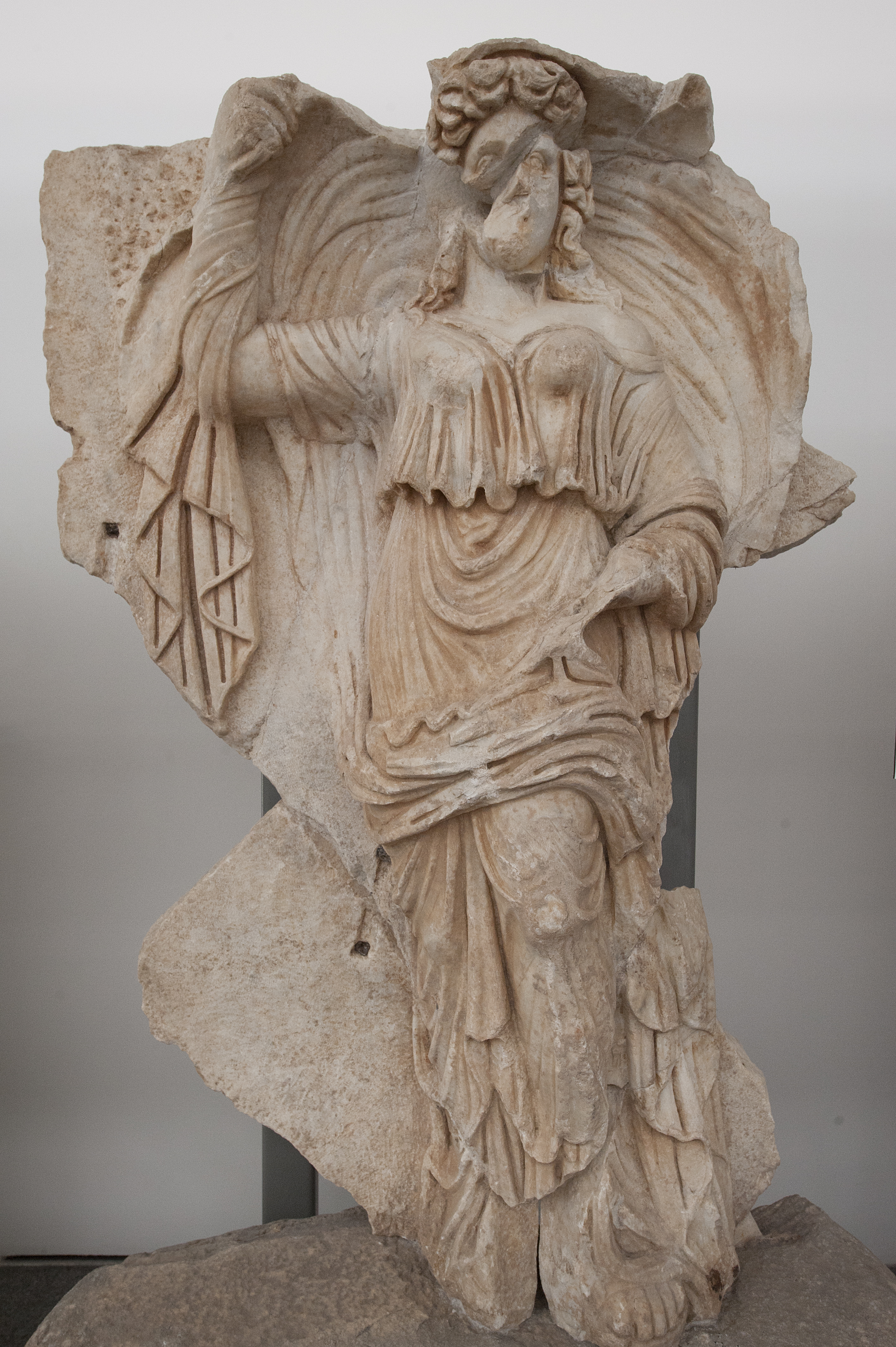
- Relief of Hemera from the Aphrodisias Sebasteion
- Abode: Sky and Tartarus

Genealogy
- Parents: Erebus and Nyx
- Siblings: Aether
- Consort: Aether

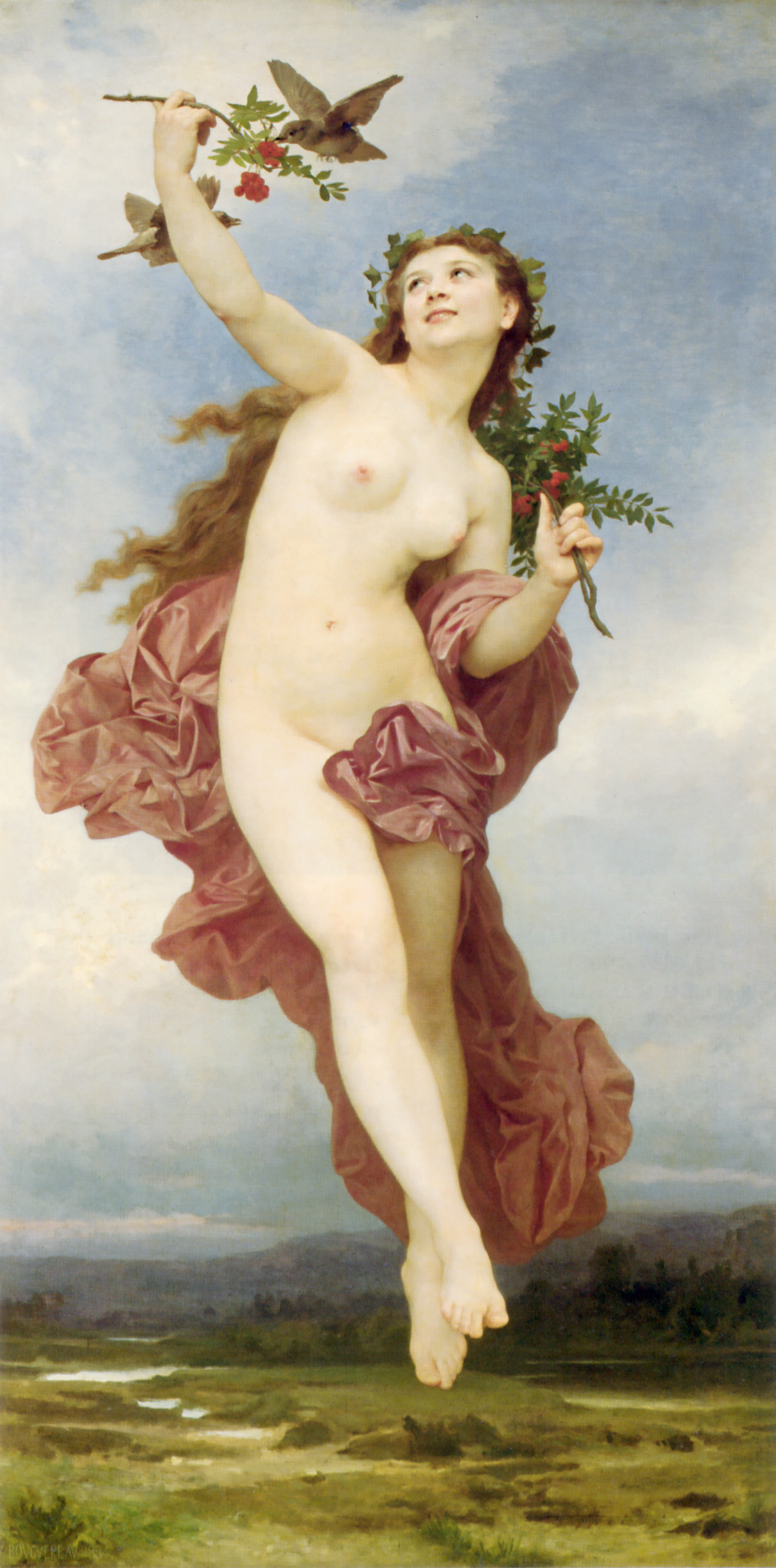
Hemera (1884) by William-Adolphe Bouguereau

In Greek mythology, Hemera (/ˈhɛmərə/; Ancient Greek: Ἡμέρα, romanized: Hēmérā, lit. 'Day' [hɛːméraː]) was the personification of day. According to Hesiod, she was the daughter of Erebus (Darkness) and Nyx (Night), and the sister of Aether. Though separate entities in Hesiod's Theogony, Hemera and Eos (Dawn) were often identified with each other.

== Genealogy ==
In Hesiod's Theogony, Hemera and her brother Aether were the offspring of Erebus and Nyx. Bacchylides apparently had Hemera as the daughter of Chronus (Time) and Nyx. In the lost epic poem the Titanomachy (late seventh century BC?), Hemera was perhaps the mother, by Aether, of Uranus (Sky). In some rare versions, Hemera was instead the daughter of Helios (the Sun) by an unknown mother.

== Mythology ==
According to Hesiod's Theogony, Hemera left Tartarus just as Nyx (Night) entered it; when Hemera returned, Nyx left:

Night and Day passing near greet one another as they cross the great bronze threshold. The one is about to go in and the other is going out the door, and never does the house hold them both inside, but always the one goes out from the house and passes over the earth, while the other in turn remaining inside the house waits for the time of her own departure, until it comes. The one holds much-seeing light for those on the earth, but the other holds Sleep in her hands, the brother of Death—deadly Night, shrouded in murky cloud.

== Roman counterpart Dies ==
Hemera's Roman counterpart Dies (Day) had a different genealogy. According to the Roman mythographer Hyginus, Chaos and Caligio (Mist) were the parents of Nox (Night), Dies, Erebus, and Aether. Cicero says that Aether and Dies were the parents of Caelus (Sky). While, Hyginus says that, in addition to Caelus, Aether and Dies were also the parents of Terra (Earth), and Mare (Sea). Cicero also says that Dies and Caelus were the parents of Mercury, the Roman counterpart of Hermes.

== Identified with Eos ==
Although Eos (Dawn) is a separate entity in Hesiod's Theogony—where she is the daughter of the Titans Theia and Hyperion, the mother of Memnon, and the lover of Cephalus—elsewhere Eos and Hemera are identified. For example, the geographer Pausanias describes seeing depictions, on the "Royal Portico" at Athens and on the throne of Apollo at Amyclae, of Cephalus being carried off by a goddess whom he identifies as Hemera. He also describes a stone pedestal at Olympia which depicted Hemera pleading with Zeus for the life of her son Memnon. Similarly, although, in Homer's Odyssey, Eos is said to be the abductor of Orion, a scholiast on that passage says that, according to Euphorion, Hemera fell in love with Orion and carried him away.

== Worship ==
While there is little evidence of Hemera having received a cult in ancient times, archaeological evidence has proven the existence of a small shrine to Hemera and Helios, the god of the sun, on the island of Kos.
