= Terra (mythology) =

Personification of Earth in ancient Rome

Tellus
- Goddess of the earth, earthquakes, fertility, nature, marriage and agriculture personification of the Earth
- Member of the di selecti
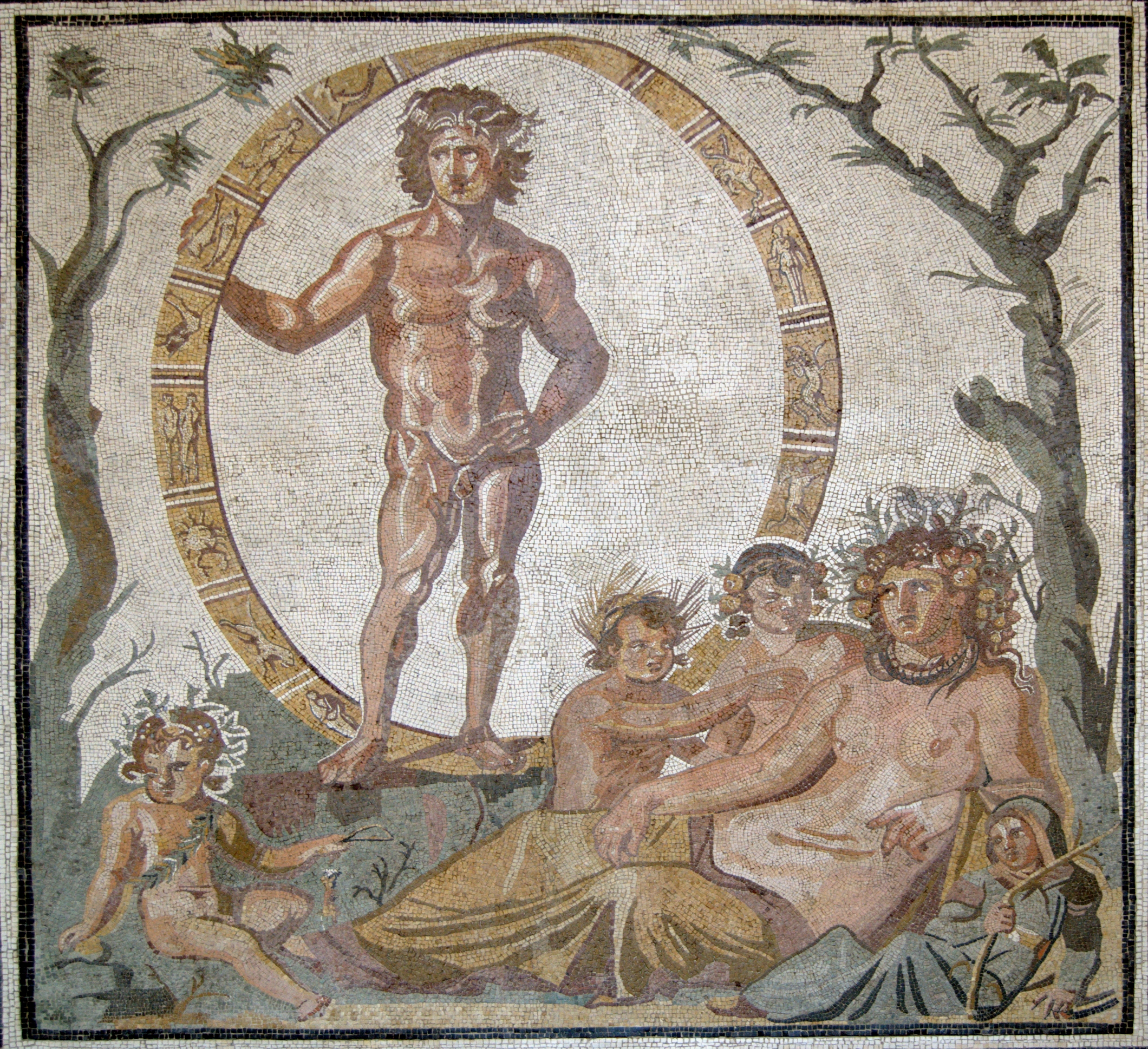
- Terra reclining with the Seasons, accompanied by Aion-Uranus within a zodiac wheel (mosaic from Sentinum, AD 200–250, Glyptothek).
- Other names: Terra, Tellus Mater or Terra Mater
- Abode: Earth
- Symbol: Fruit, flowers, cornucopia, cattle

Genealogy
- Parents: Chaos; Aether and Dies (Hyginus)
- Siblings: Caelus (Hyginus)
- Consort: Caelus (Hyginus)
- Children: Saturn, Ops, Janus

Equivalents
- Etruscan: Cel
- Greek: Gaia

In ancient Roman religion and mythology, Tellus, Terra, Tellus Mater or Terra Mater (Note: This article preserves the nomenclature Tellus or Terra as used by individual ancient sources.) ("Earth" or "Mother Earth") is the personification of the Earth. Although Tellus and Terra are hardly distinguishable during the Imperial era, Tellus was the name of the original earth goddess in the religious practices of the Republic or earlier. The scholar Varro (1st century BC) lists Tellus as one of the di selecti, the twenty principal gods of Rome, and one of the twelve agricultural deities. She is regularly associated with Ceres in rituals pertaining to the earth and agricultural fertility.

The attributes of Tellus were the cornucopia, bunches of flowers, or fruit. She was typically depicted reclining, or rising, waist high from a hole in the ground. Her male complement was a sky god such as Caelus (Uranus) or a form of Jupiter. Her Greek counterpart is Gaia, and among the Etruscans, her name was Cel. Michael Lipka has argued that the Terra Mater who appeared during the reign of Augustus, is a direct transfer of the Greek Ge Mater into Roman religious practice, while Tellus, whose ancient temple was within Rome's sacred boundary (pomerium), represents the original earth goddess cultivated by the state priests.

== Name ==
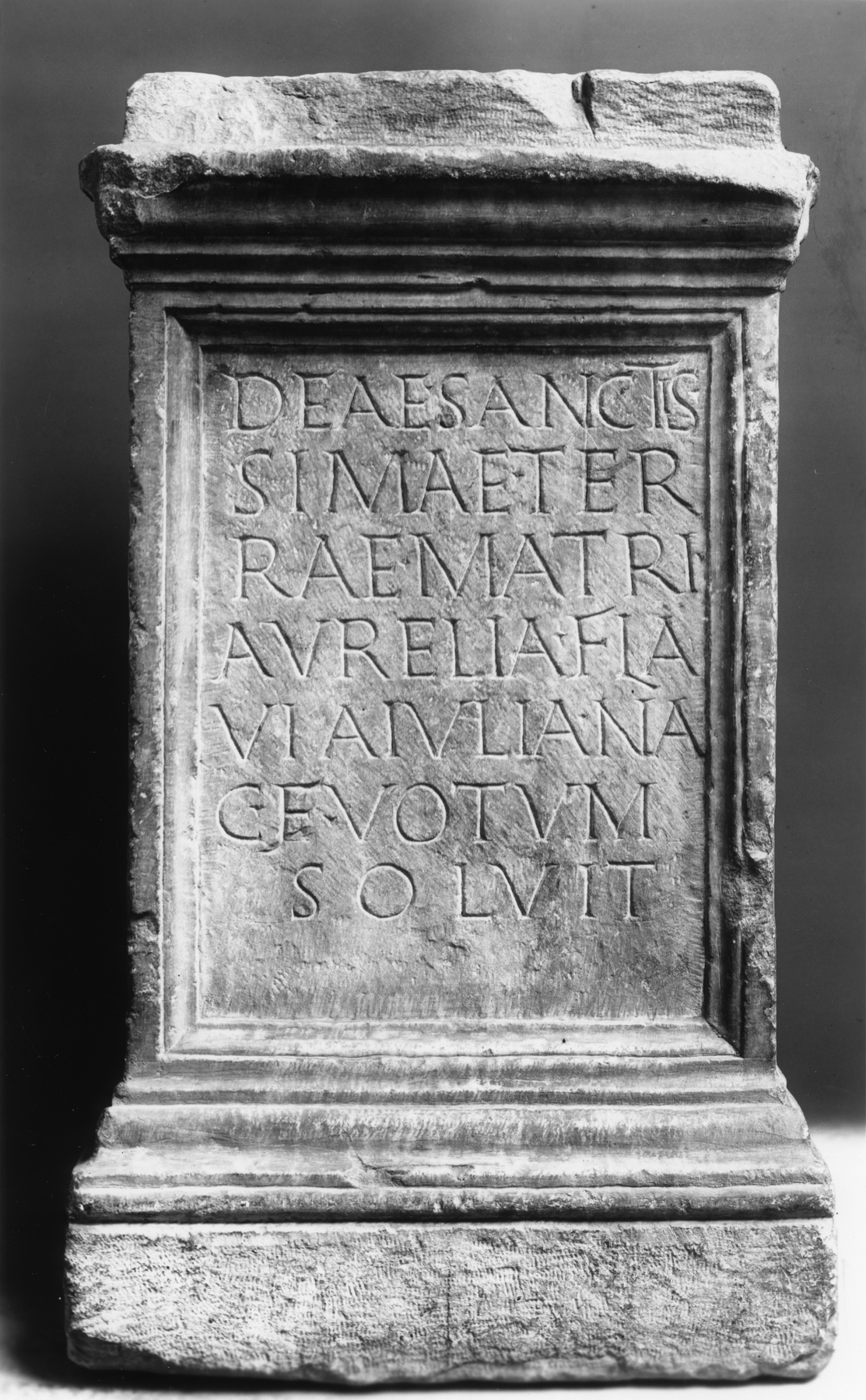
A dedicatory inscription to Terra Mater fulfilling a vow (votum), 1st century CE.

The Indo-Europeanist scholar Michiel de Vaan suggests a possible connection between the word tellūs ("earth, ground, soil") and the Proto-Indo-European root *telh₂- ("to bear, support"). According to this theory, the Earth was originally conceptualized as the "bearer" or "supporter" of the objects and creatures that dwelt atop the land. The 4th century AD Latin commentator Servius distinguishes between use of tellus and terra. Terra, he says, is properly used of the elementum, earth as one of the four classical elements with air (Ventus), water (Aqua), and fire (Ignis). Tellus is the goddess, whose name can be substituted (ponimus ... pro) for her functional sphere the earth, just as the name Vulcanus is used for fire, Ceres for produce, and Liber for wine. Tellus thus refers to the guardian deity of Earth and by extension the globe itself. Tellus may be an aspect of the spirit called Dea Dia by the Arval priests, (Note: Fowler (1908), who concurs with Ludwig Preller) or at least a close collaborator with her as "divinity of the clear sky."

Varro identifies Terra Mater with Ceres:

Not without cause was the Earth (Terra) called Mater and Ceres. It was believed that those who cultivated her led a pious and useful life (piam et utilem ... vitam), and that they were the sole survivors from the line of King Saturn. (Note: Varro cited by Wagenvoort (1956).)

Ovid distinguishes between Tellus as the locus ("site, location") of growth, and Ceres as its causa ("cause, agent"). Mater, the Latin word for "mother," is often used as an honorific for goddesses, including Vesta, who was represented as a virgin. "Mother" therefore is an honorific that expresses the respect one would owe any good mother. Tellus and Terra are both regarded as mothers in both the literal and honorific sense; Vesta in the honorific only.

== Temple ==
The Temple of Tellus was the most prominent landmark of the Carinae, a fashionable neighborhood on the Oppian Hill. (Note: According to Taylor it was on the lower slopes of the Esquiline Hill.) It was near homes (domūs) belonging to Pompey (Note: Pompey's domus rostrata, the house that was ornamented with the prows (rostra) from the so-called Cilician pirates.) and to the Cicero family.

The temple was the result of a votum made in 268 BC by Publius Sempronius Sophus when an earthquake struck during a battle with the Picenes. Others say it was built by the Roman people. It occupied the former site of a house belonging to Spurius Cassius, which had been torn down when he was executed in 485 BC for attempting to make himself king. The temple constructed by Sophus more than two centuries later was most likely a rebuilding of the people's. The anniversary (dies natalis) of its dedication was December 13.

A mysterious object called the magmentarium was stored in the temple, which was also known for a representation of Italy on the wall, either a map or an allegory.

A statue of Quintus Cicero, set up by his brother Marcus, was among those that stood on the temple grounds. Cicero claims that the proximity of his property caused some Romans to assume he had a responsibility to help maintain the temple.

== Festivals ==
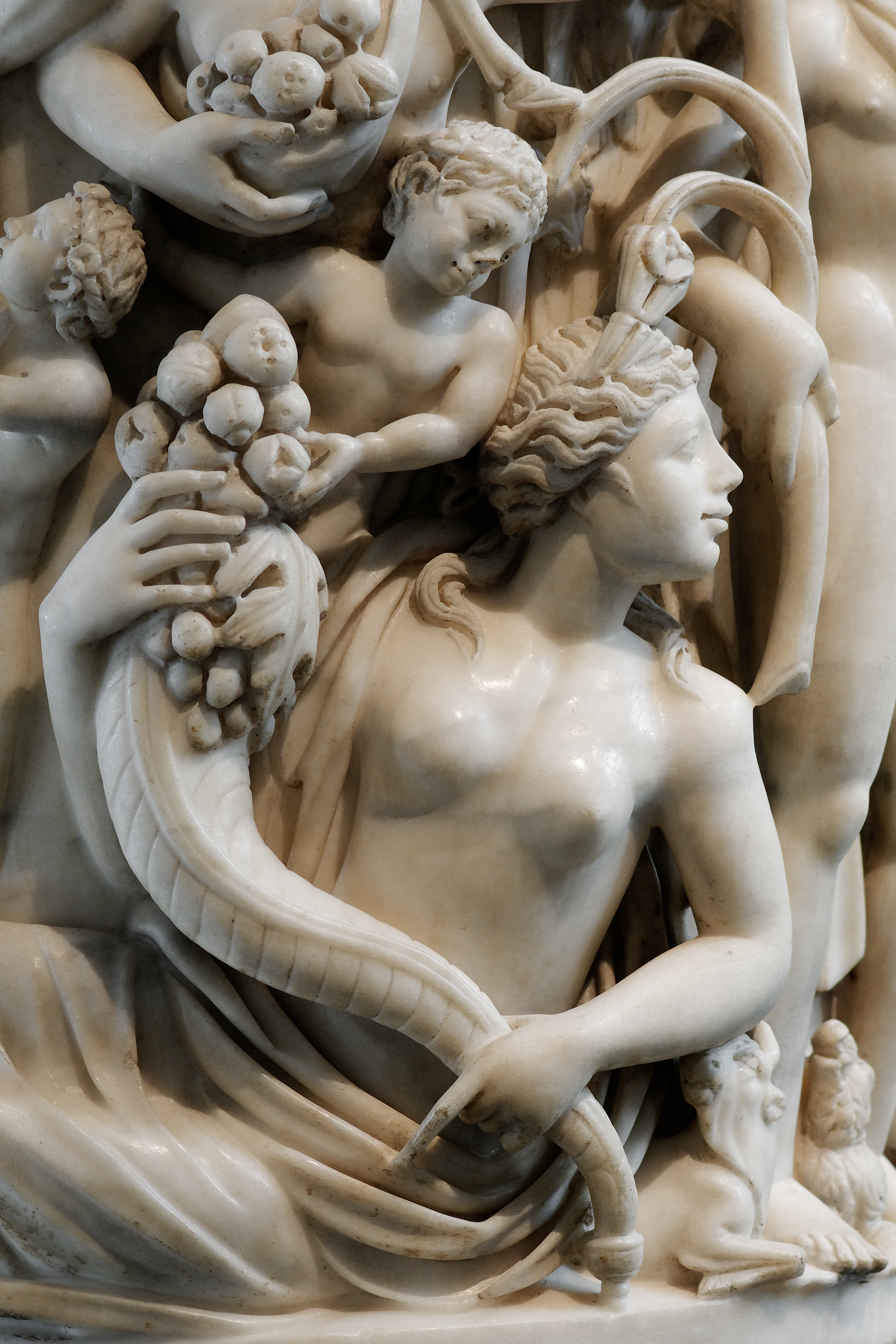
Detail from a sarcophagus depicting a Mother Earth figure (3rd century AD).

Festivals celebrated for Tellus were mainly concerned with agriculture and often connected with Ceres. In January, both goddesses were honored as "mothers of produce" (Note: Frugum matres, Ovid) at the moveable feast (feriae conceptivae) of Sementivae, a festival of sowing. (Note: Scullard (1981) considers January 24–26 to be the regular date of the feriae conceptivae.) On December 13, the anniversary of the Temple of Tellus was celebrated along with a lectisternium (banquet) for Ceres, who embodied "growing power" and the productivity of the earth. (Note: Wagenvoort (1956) argues that Ceres herself originated as the generative aspect of Tellus.)

Tellus received the sacrifice of a pregnant cow at the Fordicidia, a festival pertaining to fertility and animal husbandry held April 15, in the middle of the Cerialia (April 12–19). Festivals for deities of vegetation and the earth cluster in April on the Roman calendar. The institution of the Fordicidia was attributed to Numa Pompilius, the Sabine second king of Rome. During a time when Rome was struggling with harsh agricultural conditions, Numa was instructed by the rustic god Faunus in a dream that a sacrifice to Tellus was needed. As is often the case with oracles, the message required interpretation:

"By the death of cattle, oh King, Tellus must be placated: two cows, that is. Let a single heifer yield two lives (animae) for the rites." (Note: Morte boum tibi, rex, Tellus placanda duarum: / det sacris animas una iuvenca duas.)

Numa solved the riddle by instituting the sacrifice of a pregnant cow. The purpose of the sacrifice, as suggested by the Augustan poet Ovid and by the 6th-century antiquarian John Lydus, was to assure the fertility of the planted grain already growing in the womb of Mother Earth in the guise of Tellus. (Note: John Lydus, De Mensibus, 4.49, drawing on Varro, as noted by Fowler (1908).) This public sacrifice was conducted in the form of a holocaust on behalf of the state at the Capitol, and also by each of the thirty curiae, the most ancient divisions of the city made by Romulus from the original three tribes. The state sacrifice was presided over by the Vestals, who used the ash from the holocaust to prepare suffimen, a ritual substance used later in April for the Parilia.

During the Secular Games held by Augustus in 17 BC, Terra Mater was among the deities honored in the Tarentum in the Campus Martius. Her ceremonies were conducted by "Greek rite" (ritus graecus), distinguishing her from the Roman Tellus whose temple was within the pomerium. She received the holocaust of a pregnant sow. The Secular Games of 249 BC had been dedicated to the underworld deities Dis pater and Proserpina, whose underground altar was in the Tarentum. Under Augustus, the Games (ludi) were dedicated to seven other deities, invoked as the Moerae, Iuppiter, Ilithyia, Iuno, Terra Mater, Apollo and Diana.

== Prayers and rituals ==
The sacrum ceriale ("cereal rite") was carried out for Tellus and Ceres by a flamen, probably the Flamen Cerialis, who also invoked twelve male helper gods. According to Varro, (Note: As cited by Nonius, p. 240 in the edition of Wallace Lindsay, as cited by Schilling) the two goddesses jointly received the porca praecidanea, a pig sacrificed in advance of the harvest. (Note: Cato and Gellius name Ceres as the sole recipient.) Some rites originally pertaining to Tellus may have been transferred to Ceres, or shared with her, as a result of her identification with Greek Demeter. (Note: Schilling "Cicero as Theologian")

Tellus was felt to be present during rites of passage, either implicitly, or invoked. She was perhaps involved in the ceremonies attending the birth of a child, as the newborn was placed on the ground immediately after coming into the world. Tellus was also invoked at Roman weddings.

Dedicatory inscriptions to either Tellus or Terra are relatively few, but epitaphs during the Imperial period sometimes contain formulaic expressions such as "Terra Mater, receive me." In the provincial mining area of Pannonia, at present-day Ljubija, votive inscriptions record dedications to Terra Mater from vilici, imperial slave overseers who ran operations at ore smelting factories (ferrariae).

These are all dated April 21, when the founding day (dies natalis, "birthday") of Rome was celebrated, perhaps reflecting the connection between the Parilia on April 21 and the Fordicidia as a feast of Tellus. The emperor Septimius Severus restored a temple of Terra Mater at Rudnik, a silver mining area of Moesia Superior. Measuring 30 by 20 meters, the temple was located at the entrance to the work zone.

== Iconography ==
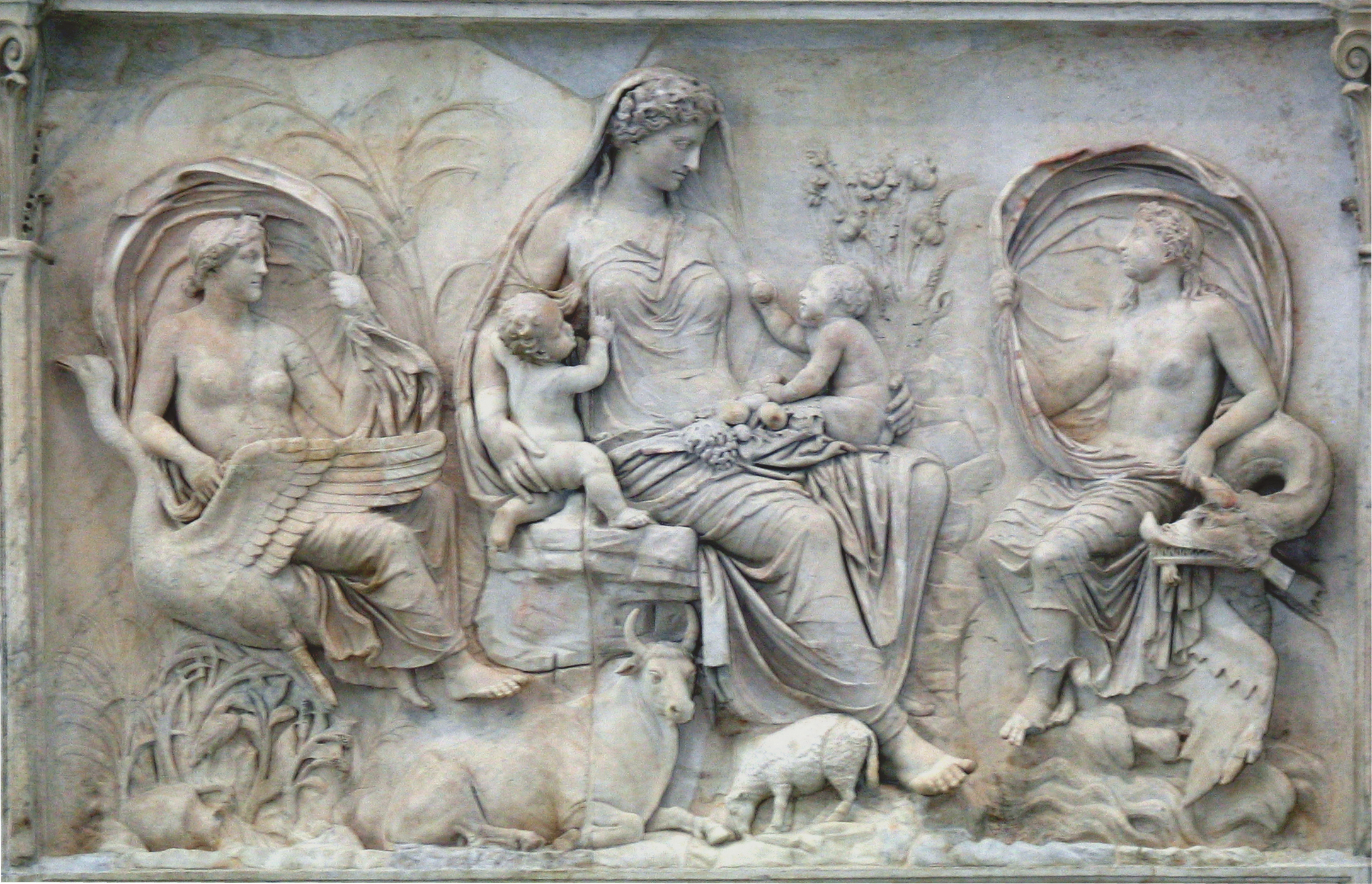
The attributes of the central figure on this panel of the Ara Pacis mark her as an earth and mother goddess, often identified as Tellus.

Tellus is often identified as the central figure on the so-called Italia relief panel of the Ara Pacis, which is framed by bucrania (ornamental ox heads) and motifs of vegetative and animal fertility and abundance. Terra long remained common as a personification, if not exactly treated as a goddess. She often formed part of sets of the personified Four Elements, typically identified by a cornucopia, farm animals, and vegetable products.

== Tellumo ==
Male counterparts named Tellumo or Tellurus are mentioned, although rarely. Augustine of Hippo identified Tellumo as the male counterpart of Tellus. A Tellurus is named by Capella but by no other source.

== In science ==
In several modern Romance languages, Terra, Tierra or Terre is the name of planet Earth. Earth is sometimes referred to as "Terra" by speakers of English to match post-classical Latin astronomical naming conventions, and to distinguish the planet from the soil covering part of it. It is also, rarely, called "Tellus", mainly via the adjective "tellurian".

== In the arts ==
Tellus was the inspiration for the name of the Tellus Audio Cassette Magazine.

== See also ==
- Telluride (disambiguation)
- Phra Mae Thorani
