= Cel (goddess) =

Etruscan goddess of the Earth

Cel was the Etruscan goddess of the earth. On the Etruscan calendar, the month of Celi (September) is likely named for her. Her Greek counterpart is Gaia and her Roman counterpart is Terra.

In Etruscan mythology, Cel was the mother of a giant Celsclan. A bronze mirror from the 5th century BC depicts a theomachy in which Celsclan ("son of Cel") is a giant attacked by Laran, the god of war. Another mirror depicts anguiped giants in the company of a goddess, possibly Cel, whose lower body is formed of vegetation.

In a sanctuary near Lake Trasimeno, at Castiglione del Lago, were found five votive bronze statuettes dedicated to Cel Ati ("Mother Cel"). The inscription on each reads mi celś atial celthi, "I [belong to, have been given] to Cel the mother, here [in this sanctuary]."

Cel appears on the Liver of Piacenza, a bronze model of a liver marked for the Etruscan practice of haruspicy. She is placed in section (or house) 13 of the liver.
