= Dies (mythology) =

Personification of the day in Roman mythology

- Personification of day
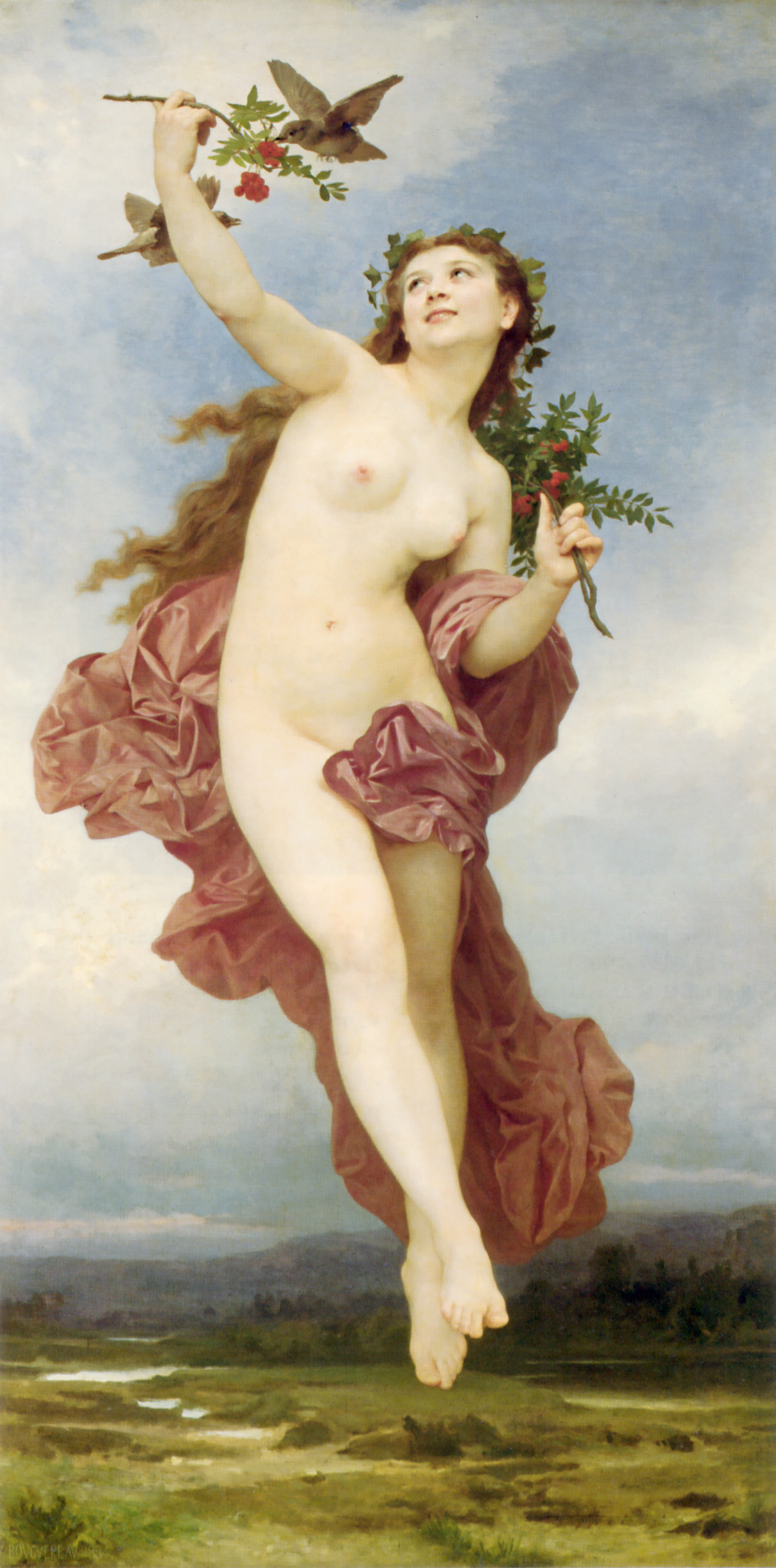
- Hemera/Dies (1884) by William-Adolphe Bouguereau

Genealogy
- Parents: Chaos and Caligo
- Siblings: Nox, Erebus, and Aether
- Consort: Aether, Caelus
- Children: Terra, Caelus, Mare

Equivalents
- Greek: Hemera

In Roman mythology, Dies /ˈdaɪ.iːz/ (Latin diēs "day") was the personification of day. She was the daughter of Chaos and Caligo (mist), and the counterpart of the Greek goddess Hemera.

== Family ==
According to the Roman mythographer Hyginus, Chaos and Caligo were the parents of Nox (Night), Dies, Erebus (Darkness), and Aether. Cicero says that Aether and Dies were the parents of Caelus (Sky). Hyginus says that, in addition to Caelus, Aether and Dies were also the parents of Terra (Earth), and Mare (Sea). Cicero also says that Dies and Caelus were the parents of Mercury, the Roman counterpart of Hermes.

== Name ==
The Latin noun diēs is based on the Proto-Italic accusative singular *dijēm, itself stemming from the Proto-Indo-European root *dyeu-, denoting the "diurnal sky" or the "brightness of the day" (in contrast to the darkness of the night). The corresponding Proto-Indo-European day god is *Dyeus.

== See also ==
- Dies lustricus
