= Erebus =

Personification of darkness in Greek mythology

In Greek mythology, Erebus (/ˈɛrəbəs/; Ancient Greek: Ἔρεβος, romanized: Érebos, lit. 'darkness, gloom'), or Erebos, is the personification of darkness. In Hesiod's Theogony, he is the offspring of Chaos, and the father of Aether (Upper Sky) and Hemera (Day) by Nyx (Night); in other Greek cosmogonies, he is the father of Aether, Eros, and Metis, or the first ruler of the gods. In genealogies given by Roman authors, he begets a large progeny of personifications upon Nox (the Roman equivalent of Nyx), while in an Orphic theogony, he is the offspring of Chronos (Time).

The name "Erebus" is also used to refer either to the darkness of the underworld, the underworld itself, or the region through which souls pass to reach the underworld, and can sometimes be used as a synonym for Tartarus or Hades.

== Etymology ==
The meaning of the word Érebos (Ἔρεβος) is "darkness" or "gloom", referring to that of the underworld. It derives from the Proto-Indo-European *h₁regʷ-os- ("darkness"), and is cognate with the Sanskrit rájas ("dark (lower) air, dust"), the Armenian erek ("evening"), the Gothic riqis, and the Old Norse røkkr ("dark, dust").

== Personification of darkness ==
In a number of Greek cosmogonies, Erebus is described as one of the first beings to exist. In Hesiod's Theogony (late 8th century BC), which the Greeks considered the "standard" account of the origin of the gods, he is the offspring of Chaos, alongside Nyx (Night). In the first instance of sexual intercourse, he mates with Nyx, producing Aether and Hemera (Day), the pair of which represent the personified opposites of their parents. The Neoplatonist Damascius attributes to Acusilaus (6th century BC) a cosmogony in which Chaos is the first principle, after which comes Erebus and Night, and from this pair are then born Aether, Eros, and Metis. The philosopher Philodemus records that in the work On the Gods by one "Satyros", Erebus is the first of five rulers of the gods, and is succeeded as sovereign by Chaos (though others have suggested this figure may be Eros). According to a hymn by the poet Antagoras (3rd century BC), one of the possible parentages of Eros is Erebus and Night.

Erebus also features in genealogies given by Roman authors. According to Cicero (1st century BC), Erebus and Nox (the Roman equivalent of Nyx) are the parents of Aether and Dies (Day), as well as Amor (Love), Dolus (Guile), Metus (Fear), Labor (Toil), Invidentia (Envy), Fatum (Fate), Senectus (Old Age), Mors (Death), Tenebrae (Darkness), Miseria (Misery), Querella (Lamentation), Gratia (Favour), Fraus (Fraud), Pertinacia (Obstinacy), the Parcae, the Hesperides, and the Somnia (Dreams). In the Fabulae by the Roman mythographer Hyginus (1st century BC/AD), Erebus is the offspring of Chaos and Caligo (Mist), alongside Dies (Day), Erebus (Darkness), and Aether. By Nox, he becomes the father of Fatum (Fate), Senectus (Old Age), Mors (Death), Letum (Destruction), Continentia (Strife), Somnus (Sleep), the Somnia (Dreams), Epiphron (Thoughtfulness), Hedymeles, Porphyrion, Epaphus, Discordia (Discord), Miseria (Misery), Petulantia (Petulance), Nemesis, Euphrosyne (Cheerfulness), Amicitia (Friendship), Misericordia (Pity), Styx, the Parcae – Clotho, Lachesis, and Atropos (Fate) – and the Hesperides – Aegle, Hesperia, and Erythea (Twilight).

In a cosmogony given by Aristophanes in his play The Birds (414 BC), which is often believed to be a parody of an Orphic theogony, Erebus is one of the first deities to exist, alongside Chaos, Night, and Tartarus. At the beginning of creation, Night lays a "wind-egg" in the "boundless bosom of Erebus", from which springs golden-winged Eros. In an Orphic theogony recorded by Damascius in his work De principiis (On First Principles), known as the Hieronyman Theogony (2nd century BC?), Erebus, alongside Aether and Chaos, is the offspring of Chronos (Time), who has the form of a serpent.

== Name or region of the underworld ==
The name "Erebus" is often used by ancient authors to refer either to the darkness of the underworld, to the underworld itself, or to the subterranean region through which souls of the dead travel to reach the underworld, and it is sometimes used synonymously with Tartarus or Hades. Homer uses the term to refer to the underworld: in the Odyssey, souls of the dead are described as "gather[ing] from out of Erebus", on the shore of Oceanus at the edge of the Earth, while in the Iliad Erebus is the location in which the Erinyes live, and from which Heracles must fetch Cerberus. In the Theogony, it is the subterraneous place to which Zeus casts the Titan Menoetius (here meaning either Tartarus or Hades), and from which he later brings up the Hecatoncheires. In the Homeric Hymn to Demeter, Erebus is used to refer to Hades, the location in which the god Hades and his wife Persephone reside, while in Euripides's play Orestes, it is where the goddess Nyx lives. Later, in Roman literature, Ovid calls Proserpina the "queen of Erebus", and other authors use Erebus as a name for Hades.
