= Caelus =

Roman god of the sky

- God of the Sky
- Gender: Male

Genealogy
- Parents: Aether and Dies
- Children: Mercury, Janus, Saturn, Ops

Equivalents
- Greek: Uranus

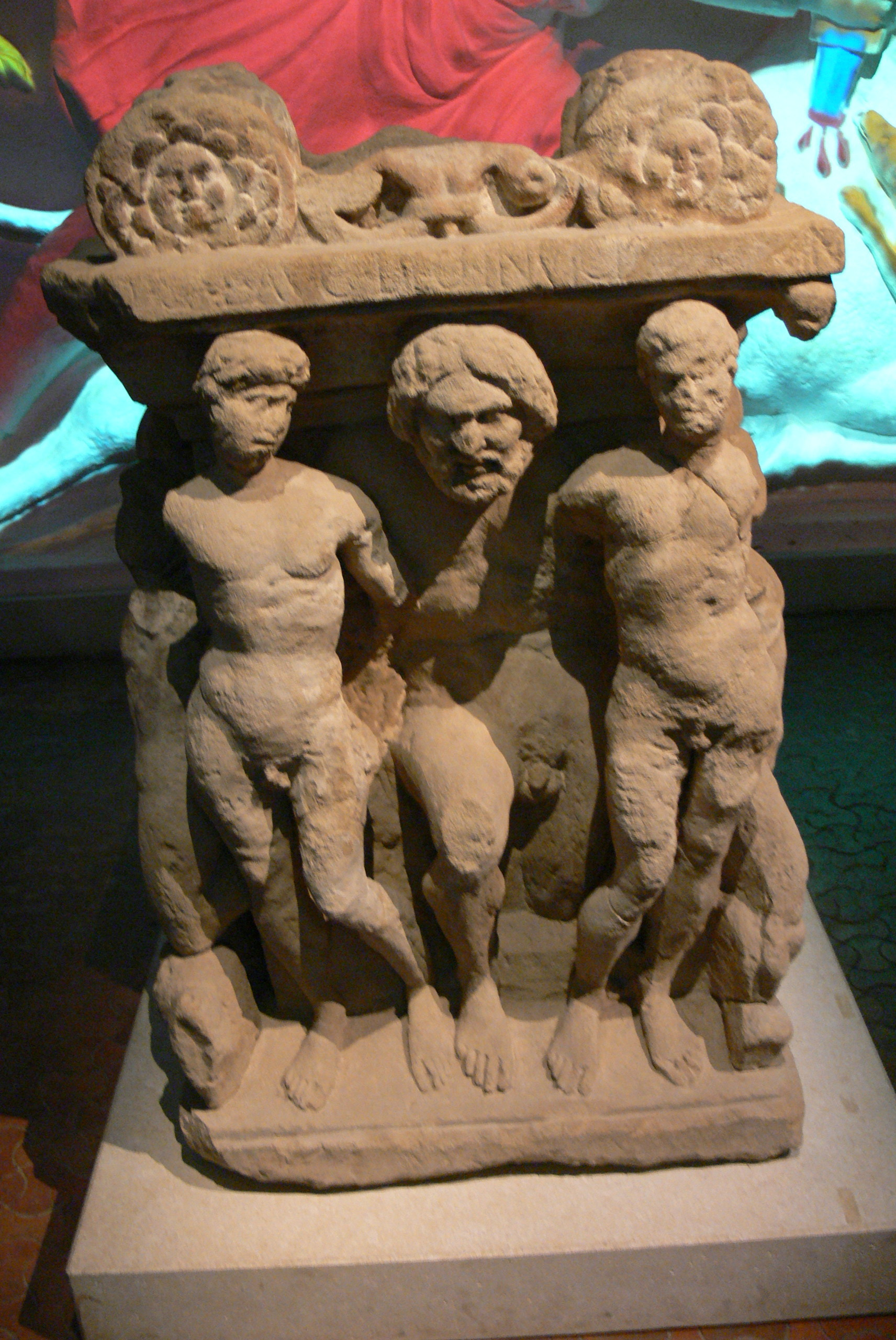
Mithraic altar (3rd-century AD) showing Caelus flanked by allegories of the Seasons (Museum Carnuntinum, Lower Austria)

Caelus or Coelus (English: /ˈsiːləs/ SEE-ləs, Classical Latin: ['kae̯.ɫʊs] or [ˈkoe̯.ɫʊs]) was a primordial god of the sky in Roman mythology and theology, iconography, and literature (compare Latin: caelum 'sky', 'heaven', whence English celestial). The deity's name usually appears in masculine grammatical form when he is conceived of as a male generative force.

== Identity ==
The name of Caelus indicates that he was the Roman counterpart of the Greek god Uranus (Οὐρανός, Ouranos), who was of major importance in the theogonies of the Greeks, and the Jewish god Yahweh. Varro couples him with Terra (Earth) as pater et mater (father and mother), and says that they are "great deities" (dei magni) in the theology of the mysteries at Samothrace. Although Caelus is not known to have had a cult at Rome, not all scholars consider him a Greek import given a Latin name; he has been associated with Summanus, the god of nocturnal thunder, as "purely Roman."

Caelus begins to appear regularly in Augustan art and in connection with the cult of Mithras during the Imperial era. Vitruvius includes him among celestial gods whose temple-buildings (aedes) should be built open to the sky. As a sky god, he became identified with Jupiter, as indicated by an inscription that reads Optimus Maximus Caelus Aeternus Iup<pi>ter.

== Genealogy ==
According to Cicero and Hyginus, Caelus was the son of Aether and Dies ("Day" or "Daylight"). Caelus and Dies were in this tradition the parents of Mercury. With Trivia, Caelus was the father of the distinctively Roman god Janus, as well as of Saturn and Ops. Caelus was also the father of one of the three Jupiters, the fathers of the other two being Aether and Saturn instead. In one tradition, Caelus was the father with Tellus of the Muses, though this was probably a mere translation of Ouranos from a Greek source.

== Myth and allegory ==
Caelus substituted for Uranus in Latin versions of the myth of Saturn (Cronus) castrating his heavenly father, from whose severed genitals, cast upon the sea, the goddess Venus (Aphrodite) was born. In his work On the Nature of the Gods, Cicero presents a Stoic allegory of the myth in which the castration signifies "that the highest heavenly aether, that seed-fire which generates all things, did not require the equivalent of human genitals to proceed in its generative work." For Macrobius, the severing marks off Chaos from fixed and measured Time (Saturn) as determined by the revolving Heavens (Caelum). The semina rerum ("seeds" of things that exist physically) come from Caelum and are the elements which create the world.

The divine spatial abstraction Caelum is a synonym for Olympus as a metaphorical heavenly abode of the divine, both identified with and distinguished from the mountain in ancient Greece named as the home of the gods. Varro says that the Greeks call Caelum (or Caelus) "Olympus." As a representation of space, Caelum is one of the components of the mundus, the "world" or cosmos, along with terra (earth), mare (sea), and aer (air). In his work on the cosmological systems of antiquity, the Dutch Renaissance humanist Gerardus Vossius deals extensively with Caelus and his duality as both a god and a place that the other gods inhabit.

The ante-Nicene Christian writer Lactantius routinely uses the Latin theonyms Caelus, Saturn, and Jupiter to refer to the three divine hypostases of the Neoplatonic school of Plotinus: the First God (Caelus), Intellect (Saturn), and Soul, son of the Intelligible (Jupiter).

== In art ==
It is generally, though not universally, agreed that Caelus is depicted on the cuirass of the Augustus of Prima Porta, at the very top above the four horses of the Sun god's quadriga. He is a mature, bearded man who holds a cloak over his head so that it billows in the form of an arch, a conventional sign of deity (velificatio) that "recalls the vault of the firmament." He is balanced and paired with the personification of Earth at the bottom of the cuirass. (These two figures have also been identified as Saturn and the Magna Mater, to represent the new Saturnian "Golden Age" of Augustan ideology.) On an altar of the Lares now held by the Vatican, Caelus in his chariot appears along with Apollo-Sol above the figure of Augustus.

== Nocturnus and the templum ==
As Caelus Nocturnus, he was the god of the night-time, starry sky. In a passage from Plautus, Nocturnus is regarded as the opposite of Sol, the Sun god. Nocturnus appears in several inscriptions found in Dalmatia and Italy, in the company of other deities who are found also in the cosmological schema of Martianus Capella, based on the Etruscan tradition. In the Etruscan discipline of divination, Caelus Nocturnus was placed in the sunless north opposite to Sol to represent the polar extremities of the axis (see cardo). This alignment was fundamental to the drawing of a templum (sacred space) for the practice of augury.

== Mithraic syncretism ==
The name Caelus occurs in dedicatory inscriptions in connection to the cult of Mithras. The Mithraic Caelus is sometimes depicted allegorically as an eagle bending over the sphere of heaven marked with symbols of the planets or the zodiac. In a Mithraic context he is associated with Cautes and can appear as Caelus Aeternus ("Eternal Sky"). A form of Ahura-Mazda is invoked in Latin as Caelus Aeternus Iupiter. The walls of some mithrea feature allegorical depictions of the cosmos with Oceanus and Caelus. The mithraeum of Dieburg represents the tripartite world with Caelus, Oceanus, and Tellus below Phaeton-Heliodromus.

== Jewish syncretism ==
Some Roman writers used Caelus or Caelum as a way to express the monotheistic god of Judaism (Yahweh). Juvenal identifies the Jewish God with Caelus as the highest heaven (summum caelum), saying that Jews worship the numen of Caelus; Petronius uses similar language. Florus has a passage describing the Holy of Holies in the Temple of Jerusalem as housing a "sky" (caelum) under a golden vine. A golden vine, perhaps the one mentioned, was sent by the Hasmonean king Aristobulus to Pompeius Magnus after his defeat of Jerusalem, and was later displayed in the Temple of Jupiter Capitolinus.
