= Nyx =

Ancient Greek goddess of the night

- Personification of night
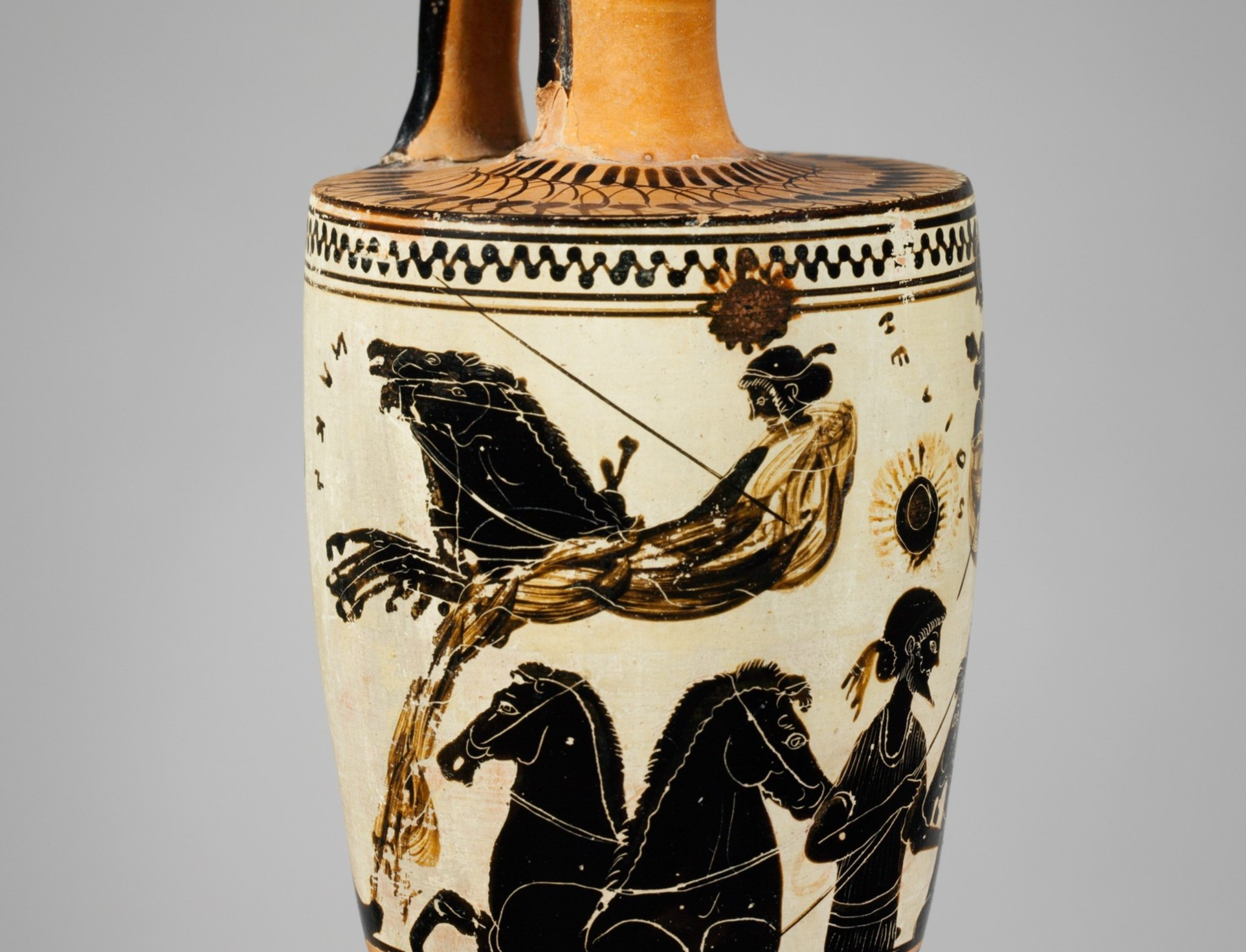
- Nyx is shown driving to the left in a chariot pulled by two horses. To the right of her is Helios, who ascends into the sky in his quadriga at the start of the new day. Detail of an attic terracotta lekythos, attributed to the Sappho Painter, c. 500 BC.

Genealogy
- Parents: Chaos
- Siblings: Erebus
- Consort: Erebus
- Children: Aether, Hemera, Moros, Ker, Thanatos, Hypnos, the Oneiroi, Momus, Oizys, the Hesperides, the Moirai, the Keres, Nemesis, Apate, Philotes, Geras, Eris

In Greek mythology, Nyx (/nɪks/; Ancient Greek: Νύξ, lit. 'Night') is the goddess and personification of the night. In Hesiod's Theogony, she is the offspring of Chaos, and the mother of Aether (Upper Sky) and Hemera (Day) by Erebus (Darkness). By herself, she produces a brood of children which are mainly personifications of primarily negative forces. She features in a number of early cosmogonies, which place her as one of the first deities to exist. In the works of poets and playwrights, she lives at the ends of the Earth, and is often described as a black-robed goddess who drives through the sky in a chariot pulled by horses. In the Iliad, Homer relates that even Zeus fears to displease her.

Night is a prominent figure in several theogonies of Orphic literature, in which she is often described as the mother of Uranus and Gaia. In the earliest Orphic cosmogonies, she is the first deity to exist, while in the later Orphic Rhapsodies, she is the daughter and consort of Phanes, and the second ruler of the gods. She delivers prophecies to Zeus from an adyton, and is described as the nurse of the gods. In the Rhapsodies, there may have been three separate figures named Night.

In ancient Greek art, Nyx often appears alongside other celestial deities such as Selene, Helios and Eos, as a winged figure driving a horse-pulled chariot. Though of little cultic importance, she was also associated with several oracles. The Romans referred to her as Nox, whose name also means "Night".

== Genealogy ==
According to Hesiod's Theogony, Nyx is the offspring of Chaos, alongside Erebus (Darkness), by whom she becomes the mother of Aether and Hemera (Day). Without the assistance of a father, Nyx produces Moros (Doom, Destiny), Ker (Destruction, Death), Thanatos (Death), Hypnos (Sleep), the Oneiroi (Dreams), Momus (Blame), Oizys (Pain, Distress), the Hesperides, the Moirai (Fates), the Keres, Nemesis (Indignation, Retribution), Apate (Deceit), Philotes (Love), Geras (Old Age), and Eris (Strife). A number of these offspring are similarly described as her children by later authors. Other early sources, however, give genealogies which differ from Hesiod's. According to one such account, she is the mother of Tartarus by Aether, while in others, she is described as the mother of Eros by Aether, or the mother of Aether, Eros, and Metis by Erebus. The poet Bacchylides apparently considered Nyx to be the mother of Hemera by Chronos (Time), and elsewhere mentions Hecate as her daughter. Aeschylus mentions Nyx as the mother of the Erinyes (Furies), while Euripides considered Lyssa (Madness) to be the daughter of Nyx and Uranus.

Nox (the Latin name for Nyx) features in several genealogies given by Roman authors. According to Cicero, Aether and Dies (Day) are the children of Nox and Erebus, in addition to Amor (Love), Dolus (Guile), Metus (Fear), Labor (Toil), Invidentia (Envy), Fatum (Fate), Senectus (Old Age), Mors (Death), Tenebrae (Darkness), Miseria (Misery), Querella (Lamentation), Gratia (Favour), Fraus (Fraud), Pertinacia (Obstinacy), the Parcae, the Hesperides, and the Somnia (Dreams). In the genealogy given by the Roman mythographer Hyginus, Nox is the offspring of Chaos and Caligo (Mist), alongside Dies (Day), Erebus (Darkness), and Aether. With Erebus, she produces Fatum (Fate), Senectus (Old Age), Mors (Death), Letum (Destruction), Continentia (Strife), Somnus (Sleep), the Somnia (Dreams), Epiphron (Thoughtfulness), Hedymeles, Porphyrion, Epaphus, Discordia (Discord), Miseria (Misery), Petulantia (Petulance), Nemesis, Euphrosyne (Cheerfulness), Amicitia (Friendship), Misericordia (Pity), Styx, the Parcae (Clotho, Lachesis, and Atropos), and the Hesperides (Aegle, Hesperia, and Erythea). Several other Roman sources mention Nox as the mother of the Furies, with Pluto sometimes given as the father.

In an early Orphic source, in which Nyx is the first deity to exist, she is the mother of Uranus, possibly without a father. In a later account, she is described as both the consort and daughter of Phanes, by whom she becomes the mother of Uranus and Gaia. In another account, likely derived from an Orphic cosmogony, Nyx gives birth to a "wind-egg", from which Eros emerges. In later Orphic sources, she is mentioned as the mother of the Stars (by Uranus?), and, in one account, is the daughter of Eros. Elsewhere, the late Greek poet Quintus Smyrnaeus mentions Nyx as the mother of Eos (Dawn), while according to Byzantine author Tzetzes, she is the mother of the Moirai, apparently by the Titan Cronus. In the Dionysiaca of Nonnus, Nyx is the offspring of Chaos, as she is in Hesiod's Theogony, while in a genealogy given by the 12th-century writer Michael of Ephesus (incorrectly attributed to Alexander of Aphrodisias), she is the offspring of Oceanus, and the mother of Uranus.

== Early sources ==
=== Iliad ===
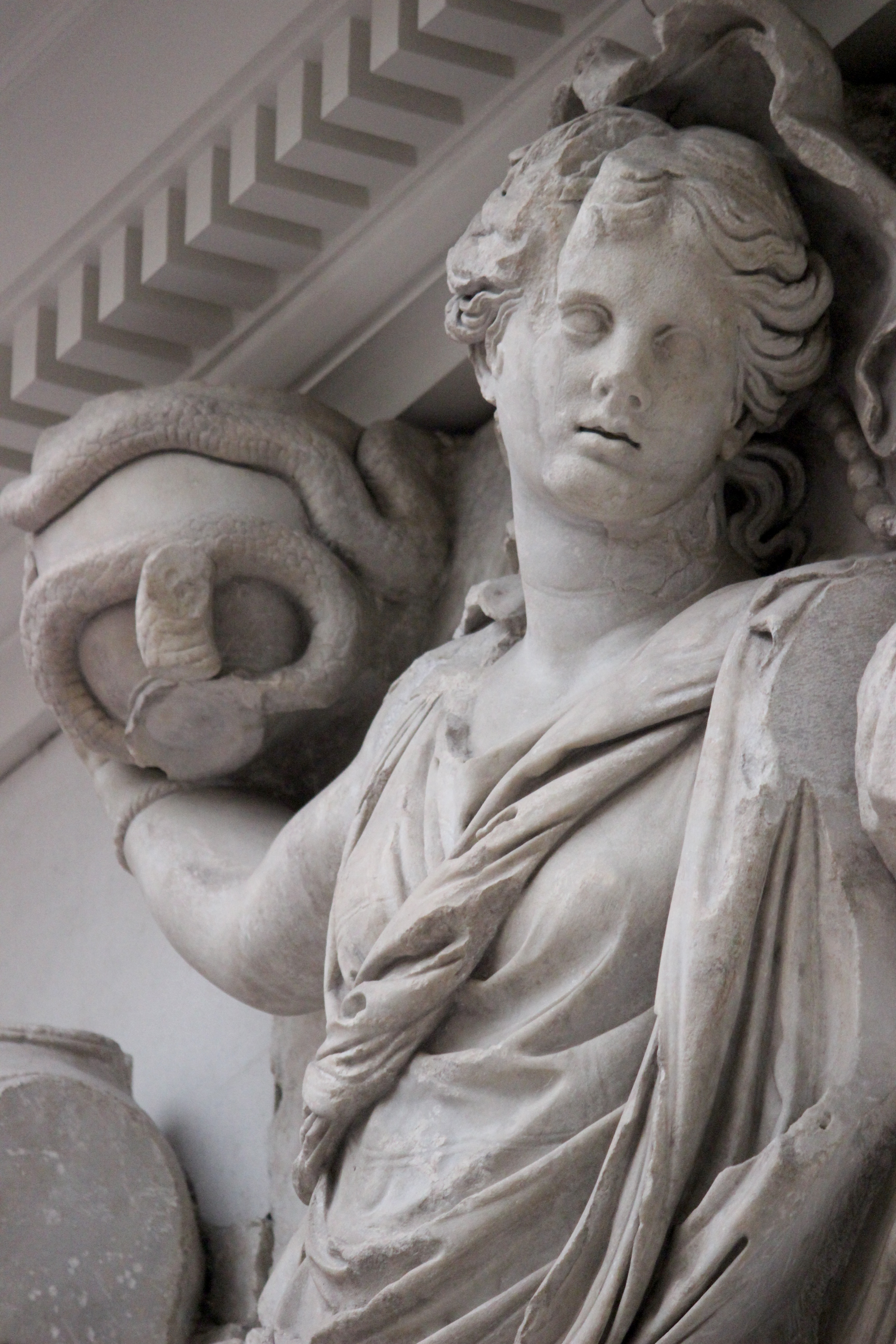
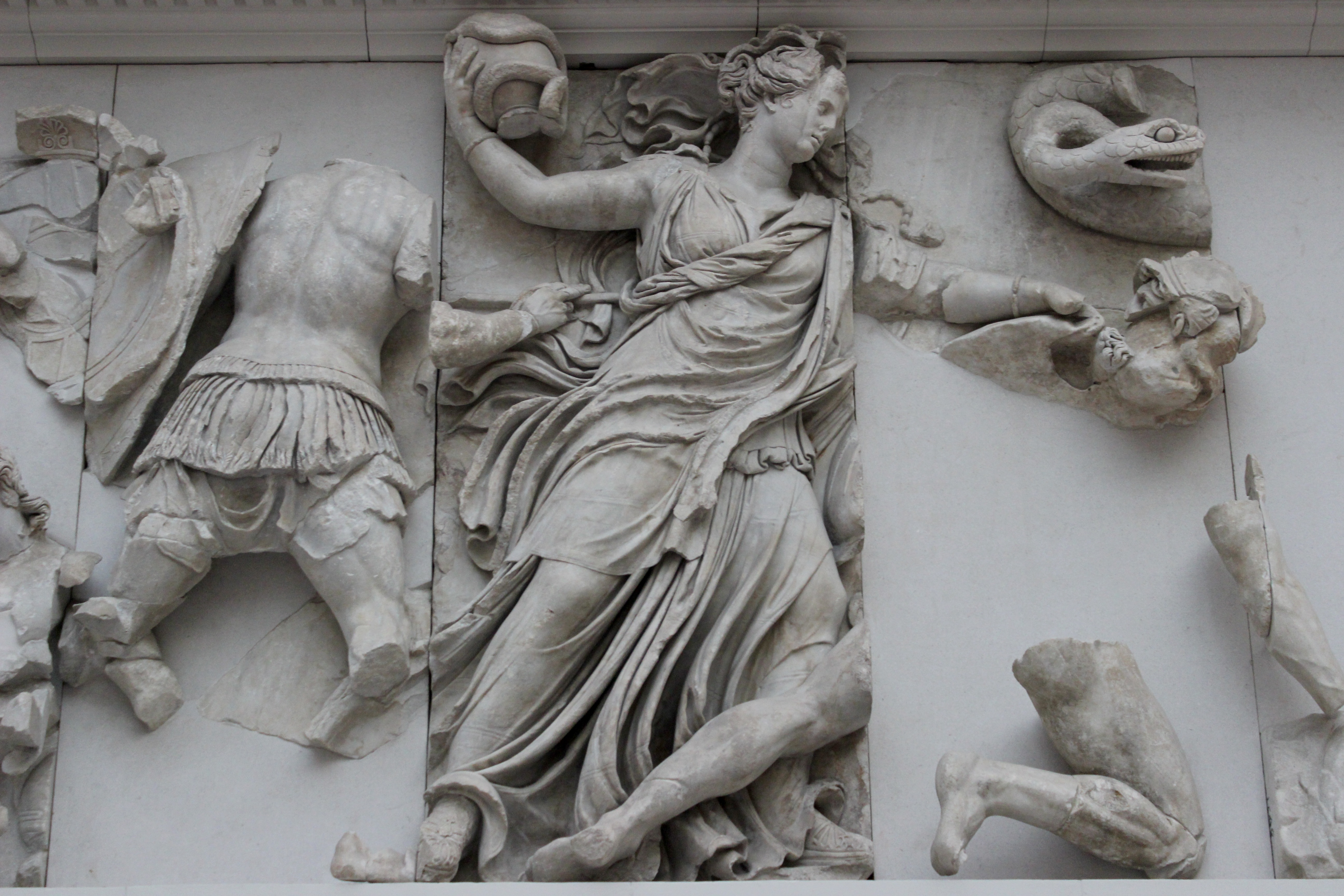
A goddess, whom some scholars have identified as Nyx, battles a Giant, Gigantomachy frieze, Pergamon Altar, 2nd century AD

Homer, in the Iliad (c. 8th century BC), relates a story in which Nyx saves Hypnos from the anger of Zeus. When Hera comes to Hypnos and attempts to persuade him into lulling Zeus to sleep, he refuses, reminding her of the last time she asked the same favour of him, when it had allowed her to persecute Heracles without her husband's knowledge. Hypnos recounts that once Zeus awoke, he was furious, and would have hurled him into the sea, had he not fled to the protection of Nyx, as Zeus, despite his anger, was "in awe of doing anything to swift Night's displeasure". It has been suggested that the apparent status which Nyx has in Homer's account may indicate he was aware of a genealogy in which she came before even Oceanus and Tethys (often believed to be the primeval couple in the Iliad), and Pietro Pucci suggests that the story may have been derived from an earlier work, which contained a more detailed account of the event.

=== Hesiod ===
In Hesiod's Theogony (late 8th century BC), which the Greeks considered the "standard" account of the origin of the gods, Nyx is one of the earliest beings to exist, as the offspring of Chaos alongside Erebus (Darkness); in the first sexual coupling, she and Erebus produce their personified opposites, Aether and Hemera (Day). Hesiod also makes Nyx, without the aid of a father, the mother of a number of abstract personifications, which are primarily negative in nature. Despite their abstract nature, however, to the Greeks these deities would have represented forces which "exercise[d] a real power in the world". Hesiod locates the home of Nyx at the far western end of the Earth, though it is unclear whether or not he considered it to be beyond Oceanus, the river which encircles the world. In a (somewhat confused) section of the Theogony, Hesiod seems to locate her home near the entrance to the underworld, and describes it as being "wrapped in dark clouds". He reports that the Titan Atlas, who is holding up the sky, stands outside of the house, and that the homes of two of her children, Hypnos and Thanatos, are situated nearby. He relates that Nyx and her daughter Hemera live in the same dwelling, and that each day they pass one another at the entrance to the house, with one of them leaving and the other one entering; throughout the day, one passes across the Earth, while the other stays inside, waiting for their turn to leave. In her journey over the world, Hesiod describes Nyx as "wrapped in a vaporous cloud", and as holding her son Hypnos in her arms.

=== Other ===
Nyx features in a number of early cosmogonies other than Hesiod's, where she is similarly mentioned among the earliest deities. The philosopher Philodemus, writing in his De pietate (On Piety), reports that the legendary poet Musaeus considered Tartarus and Night to be the first beings to exist, followed by Air. Philodemus also writes that, according to Epimenides (7th or 6th century BC), the two first principles are Air and Night, from which "everything else is constituted"; the Neoplatonist Damascius adds to this, stating that from Air and Night is born Tartarus, who in turn produces two Titans (by Night?). Damascius also writes that the logographer and mythographer Acusilaus (6th century BC) believed that Chaos precedes Erebus and Night, and that this pair then produce Aether, Eros, and Metis; a scholium on Theocritus, in contrast, states that Acusilaus considered Night and Aether to be the parents of Eros. In the cosmogony given by the comic playwright Antiphanes (4th century BC), as recorded by the Christian writer Irenaeus, Night is first deity to exist alongside Silence, and out of this initial pair comes Chaos. From Night and Chaos then springs Eros (Love), who in turn produces Light and the first generation of the gods. Philodemus, writing in his De pietate, also records that Night is described as the "first goddess" in the first book of Chrysippus' Physics, and mentions another cosmogony (the origin of which he does not specify), in which Night and Tartarus are the first pair, from whom "all things are born".

Authors following Hesiod similarly describe Nyx as living at the ends of the Earth. The choral lyric poet Alcman (7th century BC), as recorded by a scholium on Sophocles, considered Nyx to live in the far north, describing the Riphean Mountains as being "breast of black night". In the Geryoneis of Stesichorus (6th century BC), Nyx appears to live beyond Oceanus in the far west, as Stesichorus writes that after Helios crosses the river at the end of the day, he "reach[es] the depths of holy, dark night". The Pre-Socratic philosopher Parmenides (6th or 5th centuries BC), in the proem to his philosophical treatise, appropriates Hesiod's description of the alternation of Nyx and Hemera, referring to "the gates of the ways of Night and Day", and, according to Walter Burkert, he considered the Heliades to live in the house of Night. In tragedy, the Orestes of Euripides (5th century BC) states that Nyx has her abode in Erebus, while a fragment of Sophocles mentions the "springs of Night", which are located in the north. Later, Apollonius of Rhodes (3rd century BC) writes in his Argonautica that the Eridanus river "ris[es] from the end of the earth, where the gates and precincts of Night are located", locating her home in the far west.

Among descriptions of Nyx in 5th century BC tragedy, Euripides, in his play Ion, represents her as being "robed in black", and her chariot as being pulled by two horses. He reports that she prepares her chariot as Helios finishes his journey across the sky at the end of the day, and that the stars are her companions in her course through the sky. In a fragment from his Andromeda, he refers to her driving her chariot through Olympus, and in his Orestes, he describes her as having wings, while according to Aeschylus she wears a black robe which is "studded with colourful stars". Following the 5th century BC, Apollonius of Rhodes describes her as "putting the yoke on her horses" as the sun is setting, and Theocritus (3rd century BC) mentions the stars as the "attendants at the chariot of quiet Night".

== Roman and later sources ==
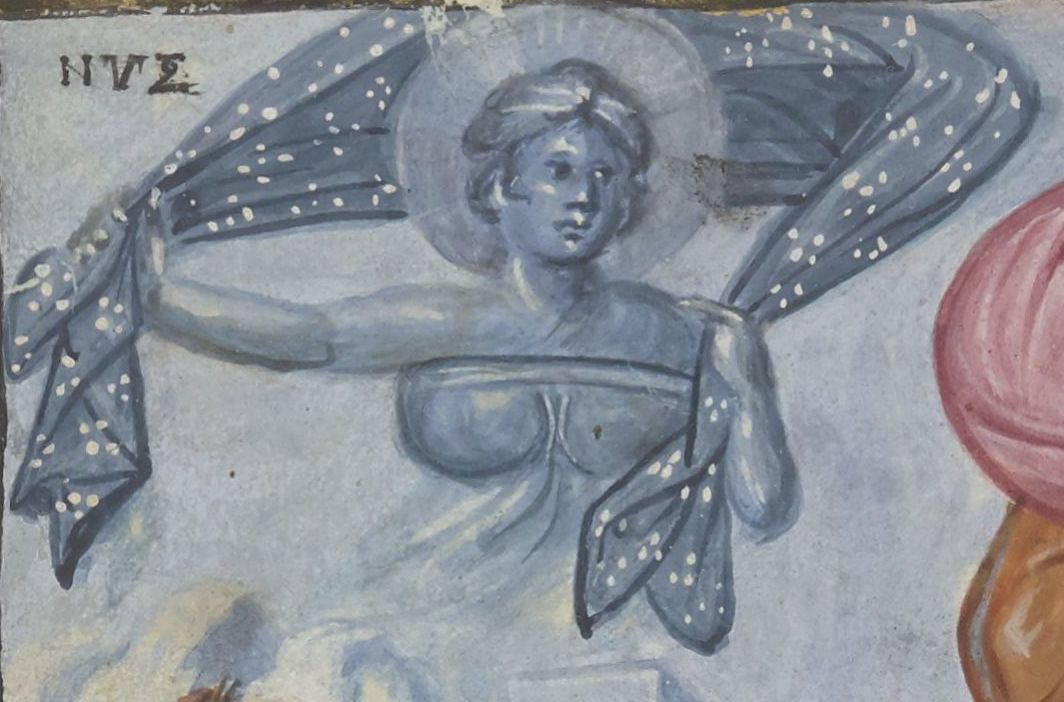
Nyx depicted in the Paris Psalter presiding over the parting of the red sea, a 10th-century Greek manuscript, National Library of France

In the works of Roman poets, descriptions of Nox (the Latin name for Nyx) put a greater emphasis on her terrifying nature. In Virgil's Aeneid (1st century BC) she seems to have lived in the underworld, and drives a chariot across the sky, while Tibullus (1st century BC) describes her chariot as being pulled by four horses, and relates that the Stars come behind her in her journey, with Sleep following after them. In the Thebaid, Statius reports that Sleep is her "charioteer", while Ovid, in his Fasti, describes her as wearing a "wreath of poppy" around her head.

In the works of Greek poets, Thetis is a Nereid who attracts the attention of both Zeus and Poseidon, until they receive a prophecy from the Titan Themis warning them that any son she produces will be greater in power than his father; according to the late Greek writer Libanius (4th century AD), however, it is Nyx who delivers this prophecy, rather than Themis. In the Dionysiaca of Nonnus (5th century), the goddess Iris, on the request of Hera, approaches Hypnos in the "ugly form" of his mother Nyx, and in a lengthy speech persuades him to help set Zeus to sleep.

== Orphic literature ==
=== Possible ancient theogony ===
Several passages from early authors, which seem to be Orphic in influence, have been taken as evidence of the existence of an "old" or "ancient" Orphic theogony, in which Night was one of the earliest figures. The earliest of these is a passage from Aristophanes' comedy The Birds (414 BC), which presents a parody of a cosmogony, often considered to have been derived from an Orphic theogony. Night is described as one of the first beings to come into existence, alongside Chaos, Erebus and Tartarus, and lays a "wind-egg" from which Eros is born:

In the beginning were Chaos and Night and black Erebus and broad Tartarus, and no Earth, Air, or Sky. And in the boundless bosom of Erebus did black-winged Night at the very start bring forth a wind egg, from which as the seasons revolved came forth Eros the seductive, like to swift whirlwinds, his back aglitter with wings of gold.

A passage from Euripides' play Hypsipyle (performed c. 411–407) also makes reference to Night and other early deities, seemingly containing traces of an early Orphic theogony:

O mistress ... of the gods ... inscrutable (light) ... first-born (in) mist (or heaven) ... Erôs willed, when (Night) ... and was nurtured then ... family of gods ...

Several modern scholars have interpreted these fragments as evidence of an early Orphic theogony in which Night featured as one of the first deities. According to Luc Brisson, the cosmogony which Aristophanes parodies came from a work which he calls the "ancient version" (la version ancienne), which he sees as the earliest Orphic theogony. In this work, he believes that Night is, by herself, the first being to exist (a position she loses in later Orphic theogonies), and that she produces an egg from which comes Eros (as she does in Aristophanes' parody), from whom all things arise. Alberto Bernabé similarly sees these fragments as alluding to an "ancient" theogony (priscae Orphicae theogoniae) which centred around the birth of Eros from an egg, produced by "Chaos-Night".

=== Eudemian Theogony ===
Night seems to have been considered the first deity in the earliest known Orphic cosmogonies. The oldest Orphic theogony in which Night is known to have appeared is the Eudemian Theogony (5th century BC), which receives its name from the philosopher Eudemus of Rhodes, a student of Aristotle, who spoke of an Orphic theogony in one of his works; this theogony was later referred to by the Neoplatonist Damascius, in his De Principiis (On First Principles), using Eudemus as his source. The only piece of information known for certain about this theogony is that it started with Night; as Damascius writes:

The theology described in the Peripatetic Eudemus as being that of Orpheus is silent about the entire realm of the intelligible for it is completely inexpressible and unknowable by the method of exposition and narration: it made its start from Night, from whom also Homer begins, although he did not make his genealogy continuous.

Aristotle similarly refers to earlier authors who attributed a primordial role to Night, presumably commenting upon the same text as his pupil. In his Metaphysics, he makes reference to theologians "who make Night parent of all", and describes Night as being one of the deities who are placed as "the first" by "the ancient poets". In addition, the Byzantine author John the Lydian writes in his De Mensibus that "three first beginnings of generation sprouted out, according to Orpheus: Night, Ge, and Ouranos", a passage which scholars have seen as referring to the Eudemian Theogony. Because of this, it has been proposed that Night, presumably on her own, is described as the mother of Uranus and Gaia in the work; West takes this further, claiming that Night is the mother of Uranus and Gaia, and that they are the parents of Oceanus and Tethys, who produce the Titans.

=== Derveni Theogony ===
In the Derveni Theogony, an Orphic poem known through a commentary (dating to around the end of the 5th century BC) preserved in the Derveni papyrus, Night appears to have been the first deity; according to Bernabé, she exists eternally before the creation of the cosmos, at a time when the universe sits in a state of "cold and passive darkness". In a surviving line from the poem, quoted in the Derveni papyrus, she is described as the mother of Uranus:

Ouranos, son of Night, who was the first to become king

It is unclear, however, whether or not there was a father, and, if there was, what his identity was: Bernabé argues that Night produces him without a partner (though this view has been criticised), while other scholars have suggested that Aether may have been the father, or Phanes. Gábor Betegh also adds Gaia as the offspring of Night in the poem, alongside Uranus.

In the poem, Night was called the "immortal nurse of the gods" (as quoted in the Derveni papyrus), and in its narrative she nurtures and gives shelter to the young Zeus. Later in the work, after Zeus overthrows his father Cronus and becomes king, he consults Night on how he can consolidate his rule. She is described as she "who knows all the oracles", and delivers a prophecy to him from within her shrine (adyton); several reconstructed lines from the work describe this:

And Zeus [... came to the cave, where]
Night sat, immortal nurse of the gods, knowing all oracles
... to prophesy from the innermost shrine.
She prophesied all that it was permitted him to achieve,
how he would hold the lovely seat in snowy Olympus.

After Zeus receives this prophecy from Night (and one from his father Cronus), he apparently swallows either the phallus of Uranus (or, as others have suggested, the body of Phanes).

The role which Night plays in the Derveni Theogony has been compared to that which Gaia plays in Hesiod's Theogony. It has pointed out that both are described as the mother of Uranus, and occupy a similar position at the beginning of creation, with Gaia being the second being to exist in the Theogony. In addition, following the creation of world, rather than becoming rulers themselves, both deities remain present and occasionally offer guidance and assistance to younger generations. The prophecy which Night delivers to Zeus, which causes him to swallow Phanes, has been compared to the prophecy Gaia and Uranus report to Zeus in the Theogony, which leads him to swallow his wife Metis. In the Theogony, Zeus is also given to Gaia after his birth, which has been connected to the role Night plays in nurturing the young Zeus in his infancy.

=== Rhapsodies ===
In the longest Orphic poem, the Rhapsodies, or Rhapsodic Theogony (1st century BC/AD), though the first deity to exist is Chronos, several fragments appear to assign a primordial role to Night. Several writers describe the elemental mass from which Chronos emerges as dark and shadowy in nature, while the Byzantine author John Malalas reports that in Orpheus it is "gloomy Night" who "[comes] first", and Damascius similarly refers to Night as the "first being". When the god Phanes springs from the cosmic egg created by Chronos, there emerges a bright light, at which point Night is the only one who looks upon him. Phanes then creates the cosmos, doing so from within the cave of Night; a passage from the Rhapsodies states that "these things are what the father made in the misty cave", and the Neoplatonist philosopher Hermias describes Phanes as being seated in the "shrine of Night". Damascius similarly records that the two deities live together, while Proclus refers to the couple as the "two rulers in the sky ... seated eternally in the innermost shrine". In the poem's narrative, Night is both the consort and the daughter of Phanes, and, by him, becomes the mother of Uranus and Gaia. She is described as the second ruler of the gods, being preceded in this role by Phanes, and followed by her son Uranus. Proclus relates that Phanes passes on his rule to Nyx by giving her a sceptre which he created himself, handing it on to her willingly, and that after her own time as ruler, she too passes on the sceptre voluntarily, giving it to her son Uranus. When Phanes gives her the sceptre, he seemingly also confers upon her the gift of prophecy.

Proclus reports that Night is called the "immortal nurse of the gods" in the Rhapsodies, as she is the Derveni Theogony, and Damascius similarly refers to her as the "nurse of all things". In the poem's narrative, she is described as raising her grandson Cronus, though West suggests that she may have nurtured all of the Titans. According to Hermias, the young Zeus is reared in the cave of Night by the nymphs Amalthea and Adrasteia, the latter of which protects the child by standing at the door of the cave, clanging cymbals. Once Zeus reaches adulthood, Night delivers several prophecies to him, presumably from this same cave. During the reign of Cronus, she prophesies to Zeus that he will become the fifth king of the gods, and advises him on how he can overthrow his father. She directs him to use a "trick through honey", and then wait until Cronus is standing "under trees with high foliage, drunk with the works of loud-buzzing bees", before binding him. After becoming king, Zeus returns to Night, and asks her how he can solidify his rule, to which she responds:

Surround all things with unspeakable aither, and in the middle
place the sky, and therein the boundless earth, and the sea,
and therein all the constellations, which the sky has surrounded.
But when you have stretched a firm bond over everything,
suspend a golden chain from the aither.

After hearing this advice, Zeus consumes his ancestor Phanes, and, in doing so, takes in the entire creation, which he contains in his stomach. Following this, Zeus keeps Night as his advisor, and it is on her recommendation that he takes Nomos (Law) to sit beside him. Night also prophesies that Themis, who becomes Zeus's consort, will continue to be a virgin until a son of Cronus and Rhea is born.

Several fragments from the Rhapsodies seem to refer to three separate deities named Night. Hermias reports that "three Nights have been transmitted in Orpheus", and gives them the following descriptions:

He says the first [Night] prophesies, which is connected with understanding, and he calls the middle [Night] revered, which is connected with moderation, and he says the third [Night] gave birth to justice.

Clémence Ramnoux interprets these three Nights as forming a "feminine trinity" around Phanes, the first being his mother, the second his consort, and the third his daughter. Bernabé, in his collection of Orphic fragments, arranges passages relating to Night into three groups, interpreting the Nights as three separate deities who appear in different parts of the poem's narrative. He sees the first Night as a primordial deity, eternal in nature, and the offspring of Chronos, and interprets this as the Night who observes Phanes at his emergence from the egg; he views her as the same figure described as the nurse of the gods, as well as the Night who prophesies, claiming that she receives the gift of prophecy from Chronos. A passage from Proclus relates that Phanes "brings forth the Nights and, as a father, has intercourse with the middle one", which Bernabé sees as referring to the second Night giving birth to the third. Brisson interprets Night as the feminine aspect of the bisexual deity Phanes, being simultaneously his mother, sister, and daughter, and argues that when he mates with Night he is copulating with this feminine half of himself. Dwayne Meisner, however, rejects the idea that there were three separate Nights in the poem, and interprets Hermias's passage in terms of Neoplatonic allegory. One passage from Proclus apparently describes there as being five Nights, as opposed to three.

=== Later sources ===
The fifth of the Orphic Hymns (2nd century AD?) is dedicated to Night, and describes her as the "mother of gods and men", who "gave birth to all"; in this role as a progenitor, she is addressed in the Hymn as Cypris (an epithet of Aphrodite). In the proem to the Hymns, in which Orpheus addresses Musaeus, she is similarly called the "oldest of all". The later Orphic Argonautica (4th or 5th centuries AD) also mentions "holy oracles of Night about the lord Bacchus", seemingly referring to the Rhapsodies.

== Iconography ==
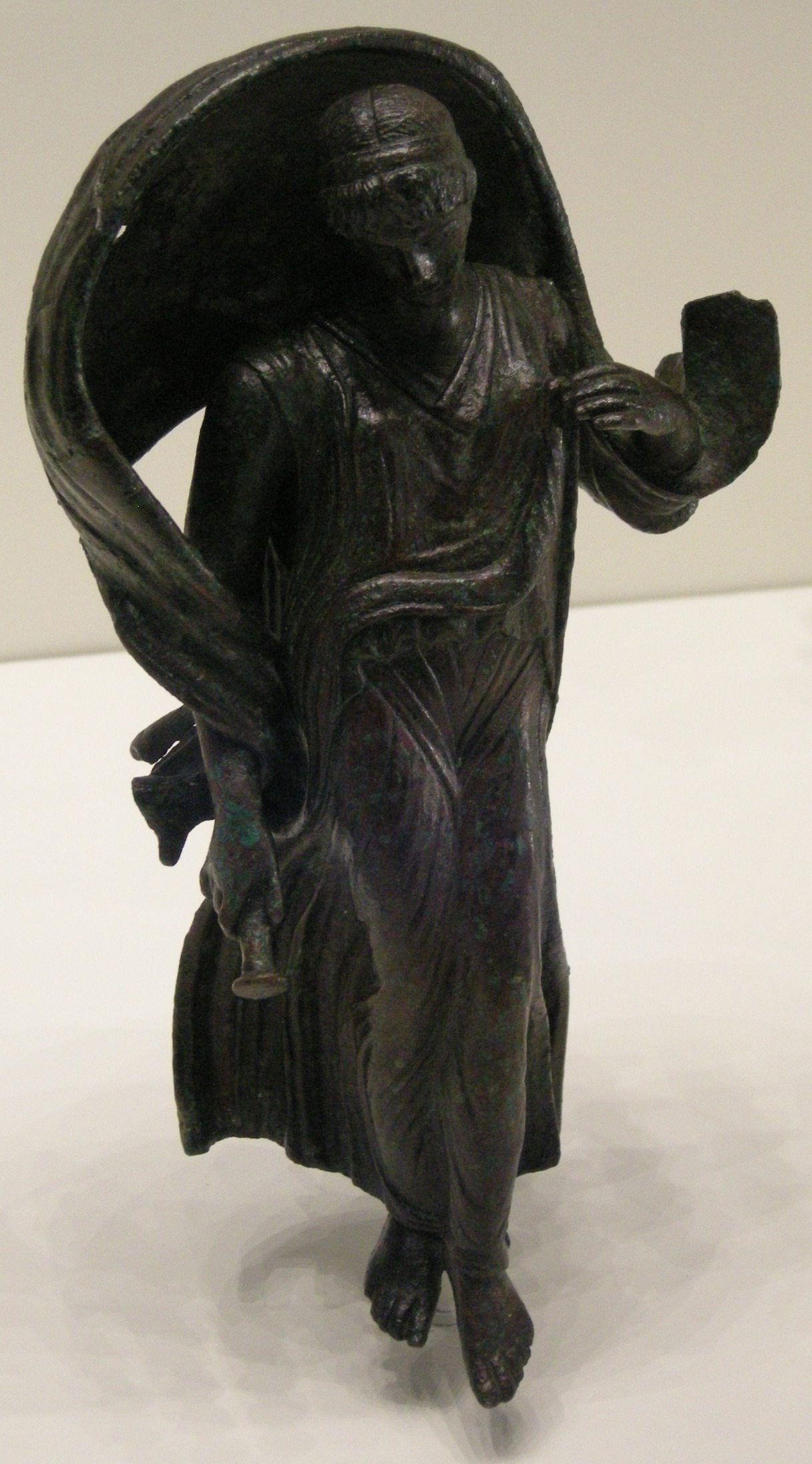
Roman-era bronze statuette of Nyx velificans or Selene (Getty Villa)

In ancient Greek and Roman art, Nyx is often difficult to identify, as she lacks a specific defined appearance, and it can be hard to distinguish her from other deities, such as Selene and Eos. According to Pausanias, she was depicted on the chest of Cypselus (6th century BC) as the nurse of Hypnos and Thanatos, where she held the two gods, portrayed as children, in each of her hands. In the 5th century BC, Nyx appears on a number of vases alongside other celestial deities such as Helios, Selene, and Eos. The earliest surviving representation of Nyx is an Attic lekythos (c. 500 BC), which shows her driving a two-horse chariot away from Helios, who is ascending into the sky in his quadriga at the start of the new day. Most depictions of Nyx portray her as having wings, and in early representations she is usually shown riding in a chariot. On the lid of a 5th-century BC Athenian pyxis, for example, she is a winged figure driving a chariot pulled by four horses, with stars dotted above her head; she rides towards a column which signifies the edge of the world, and is followed by Selene and Helios (or Eos). She is sometimes also shown wearing a dress which has black borders, or has a black piece of cloth placed on her clothes; on an Attic kylix, for example, is a winged figure (probably Nyx) wearing a black-bordered peplos, walking behind the horse of Selene.

Following the 5th century BC, depictions of Nyx no longer show her alongside other celestial deities, and most representations are uncertain. She has been identified as one of the deities fighting against the Giants on the Gigantomachy frieze of the Pergamon Altar (2nd century BC), where she is shown grabbing the edge of a shield belonging to bearded giant, and in her other hand holds a jar with a snake wrapped around it. In later depictions, Nyx is often portrayed as a velificans (with a veil billowing behind her head), and on Roman sarcophagi is a figure who puts others to sleep.

== Cult ==
There exist few examples of Nyx having played a role in cult. According to Pausanias, there was an oracle which belonged to Night on the acropolis of Megara, alongside temples to Dionysus Nyktelios and Zeus, and a sanctuary of Aphrodite. A scholiast on Pindar claims that Nyx was the earliest owner of the Oracle of Delphi, and was followed in this role by Themis and Python, while according to Menander Rhetor, Apollo competed with Nyx, Poseidon, and Themis for control of the site. Plutarch similarly refers to an oracle which belonged to Nyx and Selene. In addition to her association with oracles, Pausanias records that there was a statue of Night in the Temple of Artemis at Ephesus, created by the artist Rhoecus. Several Roman authors also mention animals which were sacrificed to Night: Ovid refers to black roosters slain to her, Statius black bulls, and Virgil a black sheep.
