= Telluride =

Telluride may refer to:

- Telluride, Colorado, the county seat of San Miguel County in southwest Colorado
- Telluride Ski Resort, a ski resort located in Mountain Village, Colorado
- Telluride Film Festival, a film festival that takes place in Telluride, Colorado
- Telluride (chemistry), the tellurium anion and its derivatives
- Telluride mineral, any mineral that has the telluride ion as its main component
- Telluride Association, an educational non-profit organization in the United States
- Telluride House, a Cornell University residential society and one of the Telluride Association's programs
- "Telluride" (Tim McGraw song), 2001; covered by Josh Gracin, 2008
- "Telluride" (Jade Eagleson song), 2023
- Kia Telluride, a mid-size crossover SUV made by Kia Motors

== See also ==
- Category:Tellurides
