= Aether (mythology) =

Personification of the upper sky in Greek mythology

- Primordial god and personification of the Upper Sky
- Member of the Primordial Gods
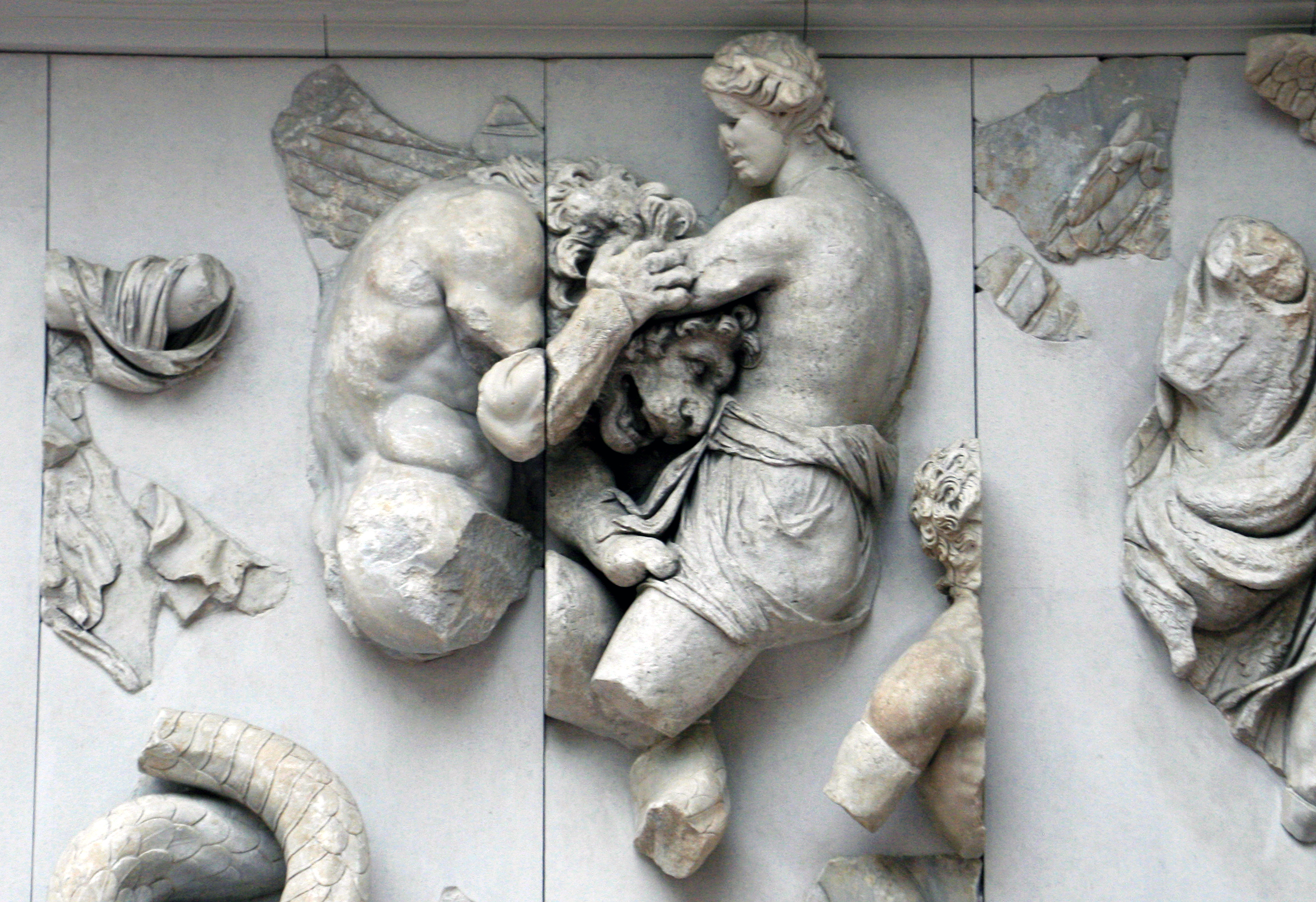
- Aether in battle with a lion-headed Giant, detail of the Gigantomachy frieze, Pergamon Altar, 2nd century BC

Genealogy
- Parents: Erebus and Nyx (Hesiod); Chronos (Orphic)
- Siblings: Hemera (Hesiod); Chaos and Erebus (Orphic)

In Greek mythology, Aether, Æther, Aither, or Ether (/ˈiː.θər/; Ancient Greek: Αἰθήρ, pronounced [ai̯tʰɛ̌ːr], meaning "brightness") is the personification of the bright upper sky. According to Hesiod, he was the son of Erebus (Darkness) and Nyx (Night), and the brother of Hemera (Day). In Orphic cosmogony, Aether was the offspring of Chronos (Time) and the brother of Chaos and Erebus.

== Genealogy ==
According to Hesiod's Theogony, which contained the "standard" Greek genealogy of the gods, Aether was the offspring of Erebus and Nyx, and the brother of Hemera. However, other early sources give other genealogies. According to one, the union of Erebus and Nyx resulted in Aether, Eros, and Metis (rather than Aether and Hemera), while according to another, Aether and Nyx were the parents of Eros (in Hesiod, the fourth god to come into existence after Chaos, Gaia (Earth), and Tartarus). Others tell us that Uranus (Sky) (in Hesiod, the son of Gaia) was Aether's son, and that "everything came from" Aether.

In Orphic cosmogony Aether was the offspring of Chronus (Time), the first primordial deity, and the brother of Chaos and Erebus. And made from (or placed in) Aether was the cosmic egg, from which hatched Phanes/Protogonus, so Aether was sometimes said to be his father. The Orphic Argonautica gives a theogony that begins with Chaos and Chronus, and has Chronus producing Aether and Eros.

Aether also played a role in Roman genealogies of the gods. Cicero says that Aether and Dies (Day) were the parents of Caelus (Sky), and reports that according to the "so called theologians" Aether was the father of one of the "three Jupiters". According to Hyginus's (possibly confused) genealogy, Nox (Night), Dies, Erebus, and Aether were the offspring of Chaos and Caligo (Mist), and Aether and Dies were the parents of Terra (Earth), Caelus (Sky) and Mare (Sea), and Aether and Terra were the parents of:

Pain, Deception, Anger, Mourning, Lying, Oath, Vengeance, Self-indulgence, Quarreling, Forgetfullness, Sloth, Fear, Arrogance, Incest, Fighting, Ocean, Themis, Tartarus, and Pontus; and the Titans, Briareus, Gyges, Steropes, Atlas, Hyperion and Polus, Saturn, Ops, Moneta, Dione, and the three Furies (Alecto, Megaera, Tisiphone).

== Sources ==
=== Early ===
For the ancient Greeks, the word aether (unpersonified), referred to the upper atmosphere, a material element of the cosmos. For example, Homer has Sleep climb:

a fir-tree exceeding tall, the highest that then grew in Ida; and it reached up through the mists into heaven [aether].

However, Aether (personified) figured prominently in early Greek cosmogony. In Hesiod's Theogony, Chaos was the first being after which came Gaia (Earth), Tartarus, and Eros, then from Chaos came Erebus (Darkness) and Nyx (Night), and from Erebus and Nyx came Aether and Hemera (Day):

From Chaos came forth Erebus and black Night; but of Night were born Aether and Day, whom she conceived and bore from union in love with Erebus.

According to a fragment of Hesiod, by his sister Hemera he is the father of a figure named Brotus. Aether perhaps also figured in the lost epic poem the Titanomachy (late seventh century BC?). Two ancient sources report statements about Aether, which they attribute to the "author of the Titanomachy". The Homeric Parsings (from Methodius), reports that Uranus was Aether's son, while Philodemus, in his De Pietate (On Piety), reports that "everything came from Aither".

Aether also appears in genealogies attributed to the sixth-century BC logographer and mythographer Acusilaus. According to the Neoplatonist Damascius (c. early sixth century), Acusilaus said that Aether was, along with Eros and Metis, the offspring Erebus and Nyx. However, a scholion to Theocritus reports that, according to Acusilaus, Aether and Nyx were the parents of Eros.

=== Orphic ===
Aether played a significant role in Orphic cosmogony. There are a large number of ancient texts which have been called "Orphic"; a few are extant, such as the Orphic Hymns, but most are not. Several important Orphic texts, which exist now only in fragments, have been called theogonies, since they contained material, similar to Hesiod's Theogony, which described the origin of the gods. At least three of these, the so-called "Derveni Theogony", the "Hieronyman Theogony", and the "Rhapsodic Theogony" or Rhapsodies, contained references to Aether the personification as well as aether the material element.

==== Derveni Theogony ====
The oldest of these theogonies, the Derveni Theogony, is a text which is extensively quoted in a commentary (dating to around the end of the 5th century BC) preserved in the Derveni papyrus. One of these quotes contains a reference to aether the material element:

When Zeus had heard the prophecies from his father,
he swallowed the revered one [or phallus], who [or which] sprang forth
first into the aither [or who first ejaculated aither].

Also possibly from the Derveni Theogony is the idea, from a fragment of Chrysippus (preserved in Philodemus, De Pietate (On Piety)), that "everywhere is aither, which itself is both father and son".

==== Hieronyman Theogony ====
The early 6th-century Neoplatonist Damascius, in his De principiis (On First Principles) comments on an Orphic text, which he describes as "under the names of Hieronymus and Hellanicus, if indeed this is not the same". This text is called the "Hieronyman Theogony" (second century BC). Damascius says that the Hieronyman Theogony had "serpent Time" as the father of three offspring, "moist Aether", "limitless Chaos" and "misty Erebos".

==== Rhapsodic Theogony ====
Also in his De principiis, Damascius briefly summarizes the "standard Orphic theology" as found in another text, which he refers to as "these Orphic Rhapsodies currently circulating". According to Damascius, the Rhapsodies (first century BC/AD?), began with Chronus from which came two offspring, Aether and Chaos:

the theology in the Rhapsodies, ... starts from ... "ageless Time" and father of Aether and Chaos which is honored most in that account.

The 5th-century Greek Neoplatonist Proclus, in his Commentary on Plato's Republic, quotes the following verses from the Rhapsodies:

This Time unaging, of immortal resource, begot
Aither and a great Chasm, vast this way and that,
no limit below it, no base, no place to settle.

Here Chasm is another name for Chaos. In another passage from the De principiis, Damascius quotes other verses from the Rhapsodies:

Then great Time fashioned from (or in) divine Aither
a bright white egg.

While Proclus, in his Commentary on Plato's Timaeus, describes the Orphic cosmic egg as "born from Aither and Chaos", and calls Phanes the "son of Aither". Proclus also says that, when Phanes hatched from the cosmic egg, Aether and Chasm were split.

Aether, the material element is also mentioned twice in a thirty-two line hymn-like passage to Zeus which was apparently part of the Rhapsodies in which various parts of the physical cosmos are associated with parts of Zeus' body. Line 8 lists things contained in Zeus' body:

fire and water and earth and air [aether], night and day,

while line 17 says:

his [Zeus'] truthful, royal mind is imperishable aither.

Also possibly drawn from the Rhapsodies is an account of the creation of the world attributed to "Orpheus" by the sixth century AD chronographer John Malalas:

This is what Orpheus stated. He said that at the beginning Aither was revealed to Time, having been created by God, and there was Chaos on this side of Aither, and on that, while dark Night held everything and covered what was under Aither, signifying that Night came first. Orpheus said in his account that there was a certain Being who was incomprehensible, supreme over all, before all, and the creator of all things, including the Aither itself and Night and the whole creation that was concealed and was beneath the Aither. He said that the Earth was invisible beneath the darkness. He declared that Light broke through the Aither and illuminated the Earth and all creation, saying that the Light which broke through the Aither was that being mentioned above, that was supreme over all things, whose name Orpheus heard from the oracle and declared: "Metis, Phanes, Erikepaios".

Another Orphic verse fragment, also possibly from the Rhapsodies, is quoted in the Etymologicum Magnum's entry on the name Phanes:

they call him Phanes
and Protogonus because he became the first one visible (φαντός) in Aither.

==== Hymn to Aether ====
The Orphic Hymns (2nd or 3rd centuries AD?) are a collection of eighty-seven poems addressed to various deities or abstractions. The fifth Orphic Hymn, which prescribes an offering of saffron, addresses Aether as follows:

Yours are Zeus' lofty dwelling, endless power too;
of the stars, of the sun, and of the moon you claim a share.
O tamer of all, O fire-breather, O life's spark for every creature,
sublime Ether, best cosmic element,
radiant, luminous, starlit offspring,
I call upon you and I beseech you to be temperate and clear.

== See also ==
- Anshar
- Heaven
