= Mnesitheus =

Mnesitheus (Greek: Μνησίθεος; 4th century BC) of Athens, was a Greek physician, who probably lived in the 4th century BC, as he is quoted by the comic poet Alexis. He belonged to the Dogmatic school of medicine. He enjoyed a great reputation, and was particularly celebrated for his classification of diseases. He wrote a work "On Diet," Περὶ Ἐδεστῶν, or, according to Galen, Περὶ Ἐδεσμάτων, which is several times quoted by Athenaeus. He wrote another work, "On Tippling", in which he recommended this practice. He is frequently mentioned by Galen, and generally in favourable terms; as also by Rufus of Ephesus, Aulus Gellius, Soranus of Ephesus, Pliny, Plutarch, and Oribasius. His tomb was still existing in Attica in the time of Pausanias.

A physician of this name from Cyzicus in Mysia is quoted by Oribasius.
