= Chaos (cosmogony) =

Void state preceding creation

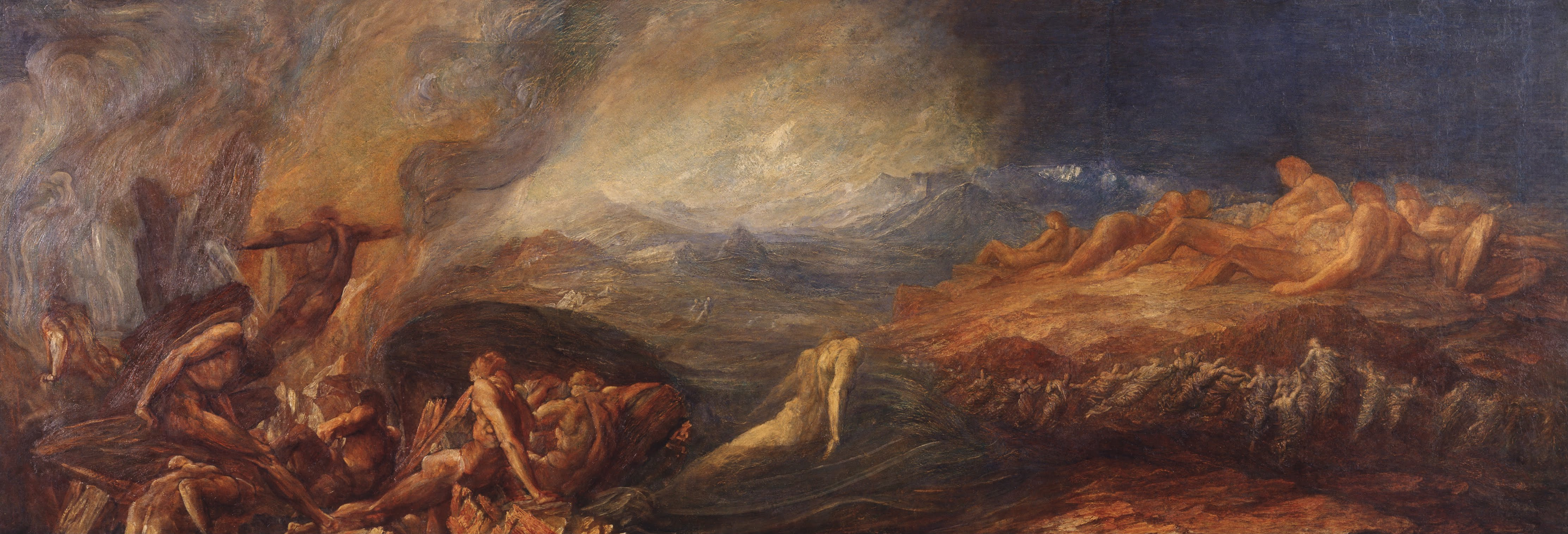
George Frederic Watts – Chaos

In the context of religious cosmogony, Chaos (Ancient Greek: χάος, romanized: kháos) refers to the division of reality outside or in contrast to the ordered cosmos. As such it refers to a state, place, or time beyond the known, familiar, and reliable world, often said to be inhabited by strange, ominous, or demonic beings.

According to the creation of the universe (the cosmos) in early Greek cosmology, Chaos was the first being to exist.

== Etymology ==
Greek kháos (χάος) means 'emptiness, vast void, chasm, abyss', (Note: West 1966, p. 192 line 116, Χάος, "best translated Chasm"; English chasm is a loan from Greek χάσμα, which is root-cognate with χάος. Most 2006, p. 13, translates Χάος as "Chasm", and notes: (n. 7): "Usually translated as 'Chaos'; but that suggests to us, misleadingly, a jumble of disordered matter, whereas Hesiod's term indicates instead a gap or opening".) related to the verbs kháskō (χάσκω) and khaínō (χαίνω) 'gape, be wide open', from Proto-Indo-European *ǵʰeh₂n-, cognate to Old English geanian, 'to gape', whence English yawn.

It may also mean space, the expanse of air, the nether abyss, or infinite darkness. Pherecydes of Syros (fl. 6th century BC) interprets chaos as water, like something formless that can be differentiated.

== Greco-Roman tradition ==
Hesiod and the pre-Socratics use the Greek term in the context of cosmogony. Hesiod's Chaos has been interpreted as either "the gaping void above the Earth created when Earth and Sky are separated from their primordial unity" or "the gaping space below the Earth on which Earth rests". Passages in Hesiod's Theogony suggest that Chaos was located below Earth but above Tartarus. Primal Chaos was sometimes said to be the true foundation of reality, particularly by philosophers such as Heraclitus.

=== Early Greece ===
In Hesiod's Theogony, Chaos was the first thing to exist: "at first Chaos came to be" (or was), but next (possibly out of Chaos) came Gaia, Tartarus, and Eros (elsewhere the name Eros is used for a son of Aphrodite). (Note: According to Gantz 1996, pp. 4–5: "With regard to all three of these figures – Gaia, Tartaros, and Eros – we should note that Hesiod does not say they arose from (as opposed to after) Chaos, although this is often assumed." For example, Morford & Lenardon 2007, p. 57, makes these three descendants of Chaos saying they came "presumably out of Chaos, just as Hesiod actually states that 'from Chaos' came Erebus and dark Night". Tripp 1970, p. 159, says simply that Gaia, Tartarus and Eros, came "out of Chaos, or together with it". Caldwell 1987, pp. 33, n. 116–122, however, interprets Hesiod as saying that Chaos, Gaia, Tartarus, and Eros, all "are spontaneously generated without source or cause". Later writers commonly make Eros the son of Aphrodite and Ares, though several other parentages are also given.) Unambiguously "born" from Chaos were Erebus and Nyx. For Hesiod, Chaos, like Tartarus, though personified enough to have borne children, was also a place, far away, underground and "gloomy", beyond which lived the Titans; and, like the earth, the ocean, and the upper air, it was also capable of being affected by Zeus's thunderbolts.

The notion of the temporal infinity was familiar to the Greek mind from remote antiquity in the religious conception of immortality. The main object of the first efforts to explain the world remained the description of its growth, from a beginning. They believed that the world arose out from a primal unity, and that this substance was the permanent base of all its being. Anaximander claims that the origin is apeiron (the unlimited), a divine and perpetual substance less definite than the common elements (water, air, fire, and earth) as they were understood to the early Greek philosophers. Everything is generated from apeiron, and must return there according to necessity. A conception of the nature of the world was that the earth below its surface stretches down indefinitely and has its roots on or above Tartarus, the lower part of the underworld. In a phrase of Xenophanes, "The upper limit of the earth borders on air, near our feet. The lower limit reaches down to the "apeiron" (i.e. the unlimited)." The sources and limits of the earth, the sea, the sky, Tartarus, and all things are located in a great windy-gap, which seems to be infinite, and is a later specification of "chaos".

=== Classical Greece ===
In Aristophanes's comedy Birds, first there was Chaos, Night, Erebus, and Tartarus, from Night came Eros, and from Eros and Chaos came the race of birds.

At the beginning there was only Chaos, Night, dark Erebus, and deep Tartarus. Earth, the air and heaven had no existence. Firstly, blackwinged Night laid a germless egg in the bosom of the infinite deeps of Erebus, and from this, after the revolution of long ages, sprang the graceful Eros with his glittering golden wings, swift as the whirlwinds of the tempest. He mated in deep Tartarus with dark Chaos, winged like himself, and thus hatched forth our race, which was the first to see the light. That of the Immortals did not exist until Eros had brought together all the ingredients of the world, and from their marriage Heaven, Ocean, Earth, and the imperishable race of blessed gods sprang into being. Thus our origin is very much older than that of the dwellers in Olympus. We [birds] are the offspring of Eros; there are a thousand proofs to show it. We have wings and we lend assistance to lovers. How many handsome youths, who had sworn to remain insensible, have opened their thighs because of our power and have yielded themselves to their lovers when almost at the end of their youth, being led away by the gift of a quail, a waterfowl, a goose, or a cock.

In Plato's Timaeus, the main work of Platonic cosmology, the concept of chaos finds its equivalent in the Greek expression chôra, which is interpreted, for instance, as shapeless space (chôra) in which material traces (ichnê) of the elements are in disordered motion (Timaeus 53a–b). However, the Platonic chôra is not a variation of the atomistic interpretation of the origin of the world, as is made clear by Plato's statement that the most appropriate definition of the chôra is "a receptacle of all becoming – its wetnurse, as it were" (Timaeus 49a), notabene a receptacle for the creative act of the demiurge, the world-maker.

Aristotle, in the context of his investigation of the concept of space in physics, "problematizes the interpretation of Hesiod's chaos as 'void' or 'place without anything in it'. Aristotle understands chaos as something that exists independently of bodies and without which no perceptible bodies can exist. 'Chaos' is thus brought within the framework of an explicitly physical investigation. It has now outgrown the mythological understanding to a great extent and, in Aristotle's work, serves above all to challenge the atomists who assert the existence of empty space."

=== Roman tradition ===
For Ovid, (43 BC – 17/18 AD), in his Metamorphoses, Chaos was an unformed mass, where all the elements were jumbled up together in a "shapeless heap".

Before the ocean and the earth appeared—before the skies had overspread them all—
the face of Nature in a vast expanse was naught but Chaos uniformly waste.
It was a rude and undeveloped mass, that nothing made except a ponderous weight;
and all discordant elements confused, were there congested in a shapeless heap.

According to the Fabulae (c. 2nd century AD), attributed to Hyginus: "From Mist (Caligo) came Chaos. From Chaos and Mist, came Night (Nox), Day (Dies), Darkness (Erebus), and Aether." (Note: Bremmer 2008, p. p. 5 translates Caligo as 'Darkness'; according to him: "Hyginus ... started his Fabulae with a strange hodgepodge of Greek and Roman cosmogonies and early genealogies. It begins as follows: Ex Caligine Chaos. Ex Chao et Caligine Nox Dies Erebus Aether. — (Praefatio 1) His genealogy looks like a derivation from Hesiod, but it starts with the un-Hesiodic and un-Roman Caligo, 'Darkness'. Darkness probably did occur in a cosmogonic poem of Alcman, but it seems only fair to say that it was not prominent in Greek cosmogonies.") An Orphic tradition apparently had Chaos as the son of Chronus and Ananke.

== Old Testament studies ==
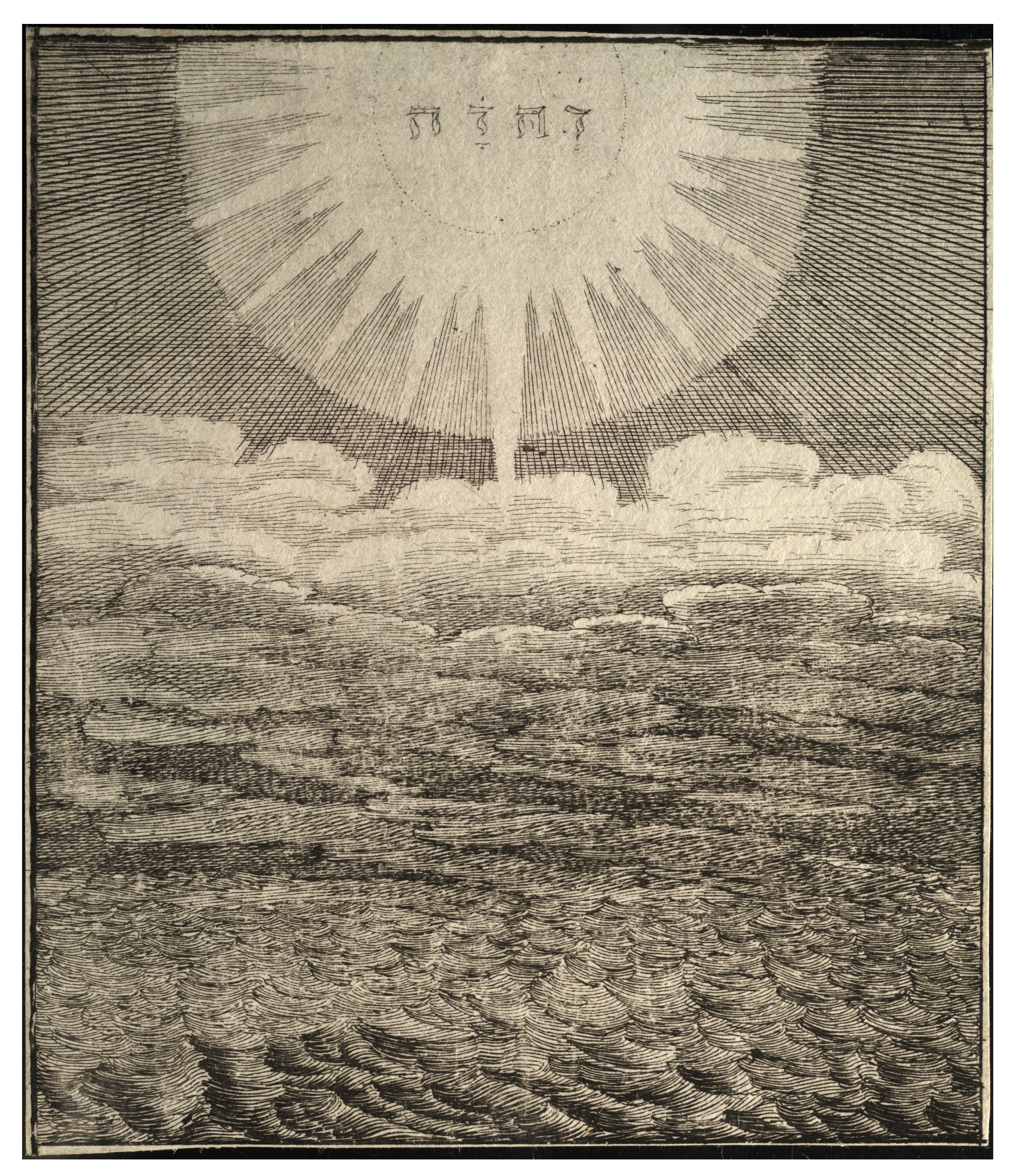
Chaos by Wenceslaus Hollar (1607–1677).

Since the classic 1895 German work Schöpfung und Chaos in Urzeit und Endzeit by Hermann Gunkel, various historians in the field of modern biblical studies have associated the theme of chaos in the earlier Babylonian cosmology with the Genesis creation narrative. One locus of focus has been with respect to the term abyss / tohu wa-bohu in Genesis 1:2. The term may refer to a state of non-being before creation or to a formless state. In the Book of Genesis, the spirit of God is moving upon the face of the waters, displacing the earlier state of the universe that is likened to a "watery chaos" upon which there is choshek (which translated from the Hebrew is darkness/confusion). This model of a primordial state of matter has been opposed by the Church Fathers from the 2nd century, who posited a creation ex nihilo by an omnipotent God.

Some scholars, however, reject the association between biblical creation and notions of chaos from Babylonian myths. The basis is that the terms themselves in Genesis 1:2 are not semantically related to chaos, and that the entire cosmos exists in a state of chaos in Babylonian myth, whereas at most this can be said of the earth in Genesis. The Septuagint makes no use of χάος in the context of creation, instead using the term for גיא, "cleft, gorge, chasm", in Micah 1:6 and Zachariah 14:4. The Vulgate, however, renders the χάσμα μέγα or "great gulf" between heaven and hell in Luke 16:26 as chaos magnum.

== Gnosticism ==
According to the Gnostic On the Origin of the World (late 3rd century AD?), Chaos was not the first thing to exist. When the nature of the immortal aeons was completed, Sophia desired something like the light which first existed to come into being. Her desire appears as a likeness with incomprehensible greatness that covers the heavenly universe, diminishing its inner darkness while a shadow appears on the outside which causes Chaos to be formed. From Chaos, every deity including the Demiurge is born.

== Hermeticism and alchemy ==
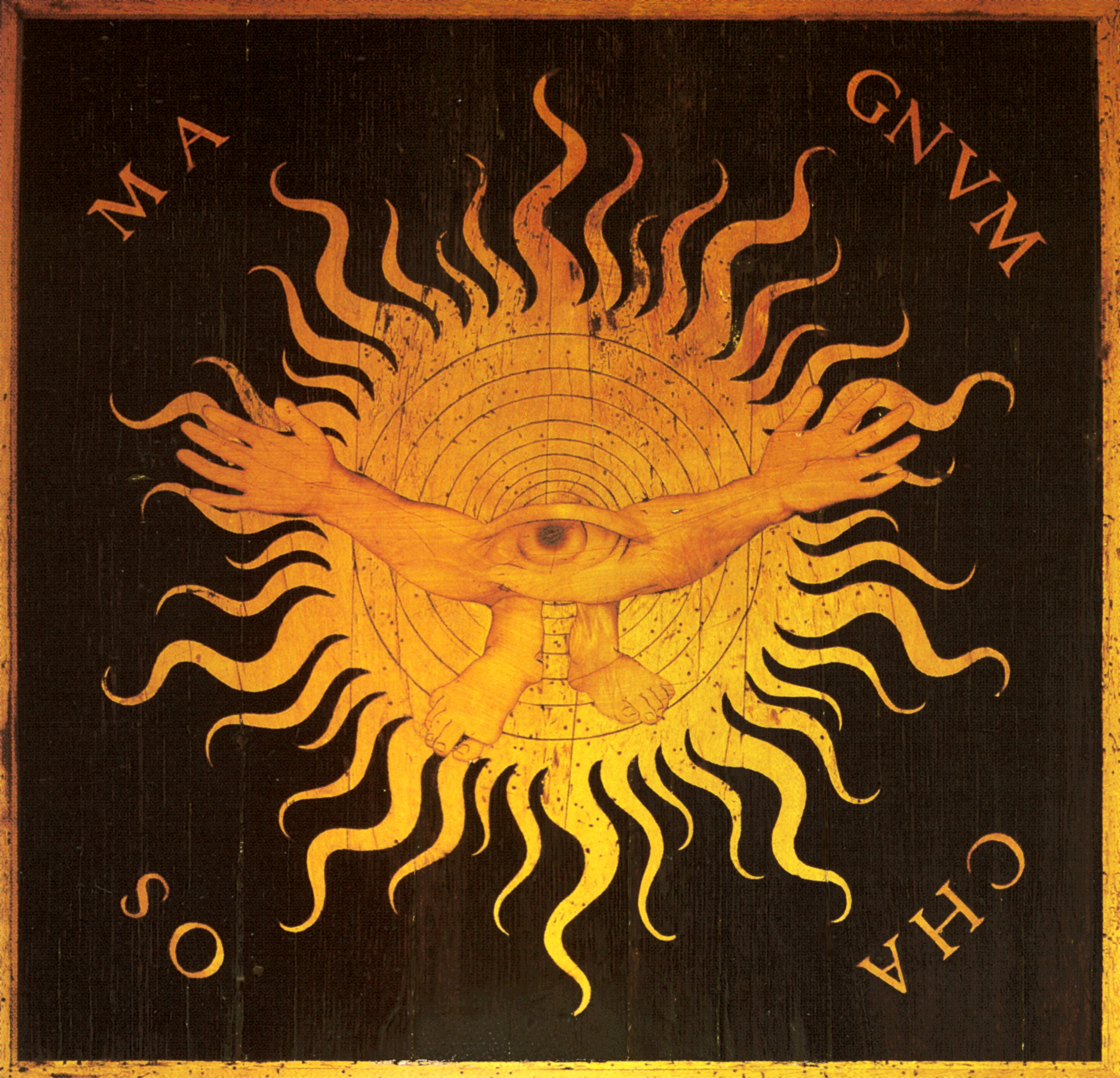
Magnum Chaos, wood-inlay by Giovan Francesco Capoferri at the Basilica di Santa Maria Maggiore in Bergamo, based on a design by Lorenzo Lotto

The Greco-Roman tradition of prima materia, notably including the 5th- and 6th-century Orphic cosmogony, was merged with biblical notions (Tehom) in Christianity and inherited by alchemy and Renaissance magic.

The cosmic egg of Orphism was taken as the raw material for the alchemical magnum opus in early Greek alchemy. The first stage of the process of producing the philosopher's stone, i.e., nigredo, was identified with chaos. Because of association with the Genesis creation narrative, where "the Spirit of God moved upon the face of the waters" (Gen. 1:2), Chaos was further identified with the classical element of Water.

Ramon Llull (1232–1315) wrote a Liber Chaos, in which he identifies Chaos as the primal form or matter created by God. Swiss alchemist Paracelsus (1493–1541) uses chaos synonymously with "classical element" (because the primeval chaos is imagined as a formless congestion of all elements). Paracelsus thus identifies Earth as "the chaos of the gnomi", i.e., the element of the gnomes, through which these spirits move unobstructed as fish do through water, or birds through air. An alchemical treatise by Heinrich Khunrath, printed in Frankfurt in 1708, was entitled Chaos. The 1708 introduction states that the treatise was written in 1597 in Magdeburg, in the author's 23rd year of practicing alchemy. The treatise purports to quote Paracelsus on the point that "[t]he light of the soul, by the will of the Triune God, made all earthly things appear from the primal Chaos". Martin Ruland the Younger, in his 1612 Lexicon Alchemiae, states, "A crude mixture of matter or another name for Materia Prima is Chaos, as it is in the Beginning."

The term gas in chemistry was coined by Dutch chemist Jan Baptist van Helmont in the 17th century directly based on the Paracelsian notion of chaos. The g in gas is due to the Dutch pronunciation of this letter as a spirant, also employed to pronounce Greek χ.

== Hawaiian tradition ==
In Hawaiian folklore, a triad of deities known as the "Ku-Kaua-Kahi" (a.k.a. "Fundamental Supreme Unity") were said to have existed before and during Chaos ever since eternity, or put in Hawaiian terms, mai ka po mai, meaning "from the time of night, darkness, Chaos". They eventually broke the surrounding Po ("night"), and light entered the universe. Next the group created three heavens for dwelling areas together with the Earth, Sun, Moon, stars, and assistant spirits.

== Modern usage ==
The term chaos has been adopted in modern comparative mythology and religious studies as referring to the primordial state before creation, strictly combining two separate notions of primordial waters or a primordial darkness from which a new order emerges and a primordial state as a merging of opposites, such as heaven and earth, which must be separated by a creator deity in an act of cosmogony. In both cases, chaos referring to a notion of a primordial state contains the cosmos in potentia but needs to be formed by a demiurge before the world can begin its existence.

The use of chaos in the derived sense of "complete disorder or confusion" first appears in Elizabethan Early Modern English, originally implying satirical exaggeration. "Chaos" in the well-defined sense of chaotic complex system is in turn derived from this usage.

== See also ==
- Abzu – Primeval sea in Mesopotamian mythology
- Ginnungagap – Primordial void mentioned in the Gylfaginning
- Greek primordial deities – First generation of deities in Greek mythology
- Hundun – Primordial and central chaos in Chinese cosmogony
- Nu – Ancient Egyptian personification of the primordial watery abyss
- Śūnya and śūnyatā in Hindu and Buddhist religions
- Tiamat – Primordial goddess of ancient Babylon religion
- Tohu va bohu – Biblical Hebrew phrase
- The Void – Philosophical concept of emptiness
- Pralaya - The primordial state of nonexistence that precedes and succeeds creation
