= Ananke =

Ancient Greek goddess of necessity

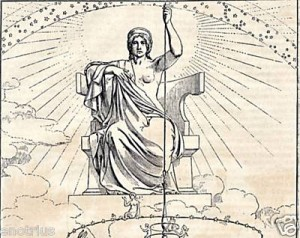
Ananke as represented by a modern illustration of Plato's Republic

In ancient Greek religion and mythology, Ananke (/əˈnæŋkiː/; Ancient Greek: Ἀνάγκη), from the common noun ἀνάγκη ("force, constraint, necessity"), is a personification of inevitability, compulsion, and necessity, and is customarily depicted as holding a spindle. The births of Ananke and her brother and consort, Chronos (the personification of time, not to be confused with the Titan Cronus), were thought to mark the division between the eon of Chaos and the beginning of the cosmos. Ananke is considered the most powerful dictator of fate and circumstance. Mortals and gods alike respected her power and paid her homage. She is also considered the mother of the Fates, hence she is thought to be the only being to overrule their decisions (according to some sources, excepting Zeus also). According to Daniel Schowalter and Steven Friesen, she and the Fates "are all sufficiently tied to early Greek mythology to make their Greek origins likely".

The ancient Greek traveller Pausanias wrote of a temple in ancient Corinth where the goddesses Ananke and Bia (meaning force, violence or violent haste) were worshiped together in the same shrine. Ananke is also frequently identified or associated with Aphrodite, especially Aphrodite Urania, the representation of abstract celestial love; the two were considered to be related, as relatively unanthropomorphised powers that dictated the course of life. Her Roman counterpart is Necessitas ("necessity").

== Etymology ==
"Ananke" is derived from the common Ancient Greek noun ἀνάγκη (Ionic: ἀναγκαίη anankaiē), meaning "force, constraint or necessity". The common noun itself is of uncertain etymology. Homer refers to her being as necessity, often abstracted in modern translation (ἀναγκαίη πολεμίζειν, "it is necessary to fight") or force (ἐξ ἀνάγκης, "by force"). In Ancient Greek literature the word is also used meaning "fate" or "destiny" (ἀνάγκη δαιμόνων, "fate by the daemons or by the gods"), and by extension "compulsion or torture by a superior". She appears often in poetry; for example, Simonides wrote: "Even the gods don't fight against ananke".

The pre-modern is carried over and translated (by reduction) into a more modern philosophical sense as "necessity", "logical necessity", or "laws of nature".

== Mythology ==
In Orphic mythology, Ananke is a self-formed being who emerged at the dawn of creation with an incorporeal, serpentine form, her outstretched arms encompassing the cosmos. Ananke and Chronos are mates, mingling together in serpent form as a tie around the universe. Together, they have crushed the primal egg of creation of which constituent parts became earth, heaven and sea to form the ordered universe. Ananke is the mother (or another identity) of Adrasteia, the distributor of rewards and punishments.

In the Orphic Hymns, Ananke is described as the child of Aphrodite.

=== Mother of the Moirai ===
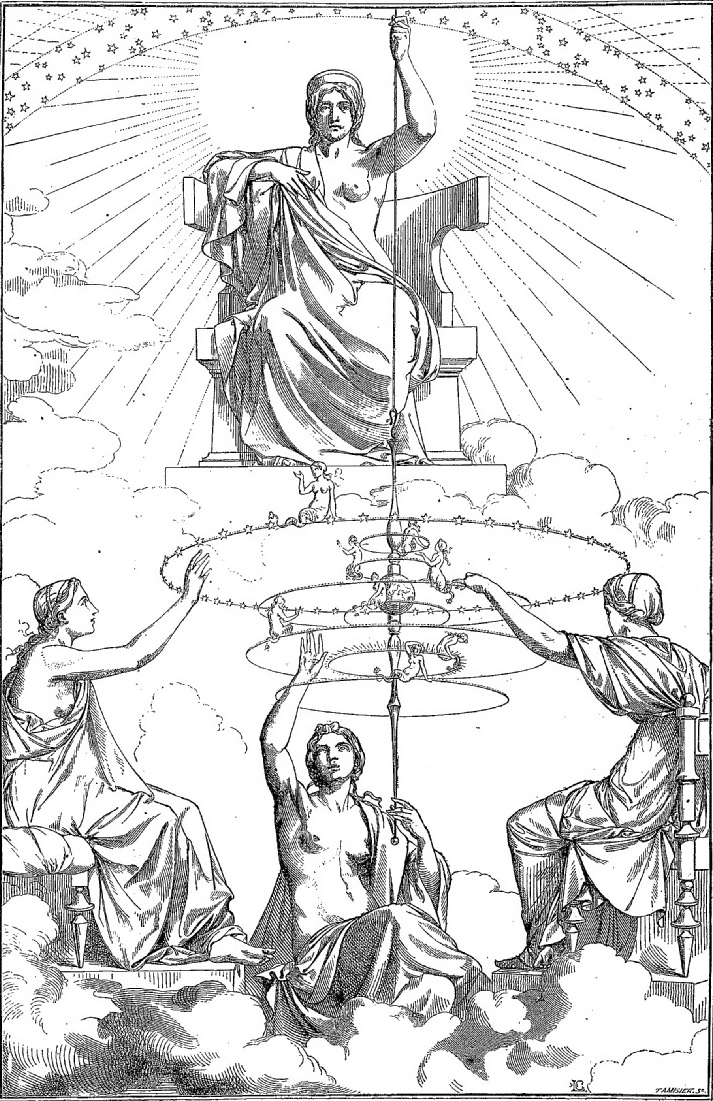
Ananke the personification of Necessity, above the Moirai, the Fates

The Greek philosopher Plato in his Republic discussed the parentage of the Moirai or the Fates in the following lines:

And there were another three who sat round about at equal intervals, each one on her throne, the Moirai (Moirae, Fates), daughters of Ananke, clad in white vestments with filleted heads, Lakhesis (Lachesis), and Klotho (Clotho), and Atropos (Atropus), who sang in unison with the music of the Seirenes, Lakhesis singing the things that were, Klotho the things that are, and Atropos the things that are to be ... Lakhesis, the maiden daughter of Ananke (Necessity).

Aeschylus, the famous tragedian, gave an account in his Prometheus Bound where the Moirai were called the helmsman of the goddess Ananke along with the three Erinyes:

Prometheus: Not in this way is Moira (Fate), who brings all to fulfillment, destined to complete this course. Only when I have been bent by pangs and tortures infinite am I to escape my bondage. Skill is weaker by far than Ananke (Necessity).

Chorus: Who then is the helmsman of Ananke (Necessity)?

Prometheus: The three-shaped (trimorphoi) Moirai (Moirae, Fates) and mindful (mnêmones) Erinyes (Furies).

Chorus: Can it be that Zeus has less power than they do?

Prometheus: Yes, in that even he cannot escape what is foretold.

Chorus: Why, what is fated for Zeus except to hold eternal sway?

Prometheus: This you must not learn yet; do not be over-eager.

Chorus: It is some solemn secret, surely, that you enshroud in mystery.

Here Prometheus speaks of a secret prophecy, rendered ineluctable by Ananke, that any son born of Zeus and Thetis would depose the god. (In fact, any son of Thetis was destined to be greater than his father.)

== In philosophical thought ==
In the Timaeus, Plato has the character Timaeus (not Socrates) argue that in the creation of the universe, there is a uniting of opposing elements, intellect ('nous') and necessity ('ananke'). Elsewhere, Plato blends abstraction with his own myth making: "For this ordered world (cosmos) is of a mixed birth: it is the offspring of a union of Necessity and Intellect. Intellect prevailing over Necessity by persuading (from Peitho, goddess of persuasion) it to direct most of the things that come to be toward what is best, and the result of this subjugation of Necessity to wise persuasion is the initial formation of the universe". In Victor Hugo's novel Notre-Dame of Paris, the word "Ananke" is written upon a wall of Notre-Dame by the hand of Dom Claude Frollo. In his Toute la Lyre, Hugo also mentions Ananke as a symbol of love. In 1866, he wrote:

Religion, society, nature; these are the three struggles of man. These three conflicts are, at the same time, his three needs: it is necessary for him to believe, hence the temple; it is necessary for him to create, hence the city; it is necessary for him to live, hence the plow and the ship. But these three solutions contain three conflicts. The mysterious difficulty of life springs from all three. Man has to deal with obstacles under the form of superstition, under the form of prejudice, and under the form of the elements. A triple "ananke" (necessity) weighs upon us, the "ananke" of dogmas, the "ananke" of laws, and the "ananke" of things. In Notre-Dame de Paris the author has denounced the first; in Les Misérables he has pointed out the second; in this book (Toilers of the Sea) he indicates the third. With these three fatalities which envelop man is mingled the interior fatality, that supreme ananke, the human heart.

— Victor Hugo, Toilers of the Sea, 1866

Sigmund Freud in Civilization and Its Discontents (p. 140) said: "We can only be satisfied, therefore, if we assert that the process of civilization is a modification which the vital process experiences under the influence of a task that is set it by Eros and instigated by Ananke — by the exigencies of reality; and that this task is one of uniting separate individuals into a community bound together by libidinal ties."

Wallace Stevens, in a poem of the 1930s, writes: "The sense of the serpent in you, Ananke, / And your averted stride / Add nothing to the horror of the frost / That glistens on your face and hair." This connects with Stevens's sense of necessity or fate in his later work, especially in the collection The Auroras of Autumn.

Robert Bird's essay "Ancient Terror", inspired by Léon Bakst's painting Terror Antiquus, speculates on the evolution of Greek religion, tracing it to an original belief in a single, supreme goddess. Vyacheslav Ivanov suggests that the ancients viewed all that is human and all that is revered as divine as relative and transient: "Only Fate (Eimarmene), or universal necessity (Ananke), the inevitable 'Adrasteia', the faceless countenance and hollow sound of unknown Destiny, was absolute." Before the goddess, who is both indestructible Force of Love and absolute Fate the Destroyer, Life-Giver and Fate-Death, as well as incorporating Mnemosyne (Memory) and Gaia (Mother Earth), masculine daring and warring are impotent and transient, and the masculine order imposed by Zeus and the other Olympian Gods is artificial.
