= Fates =

Characters in mythology

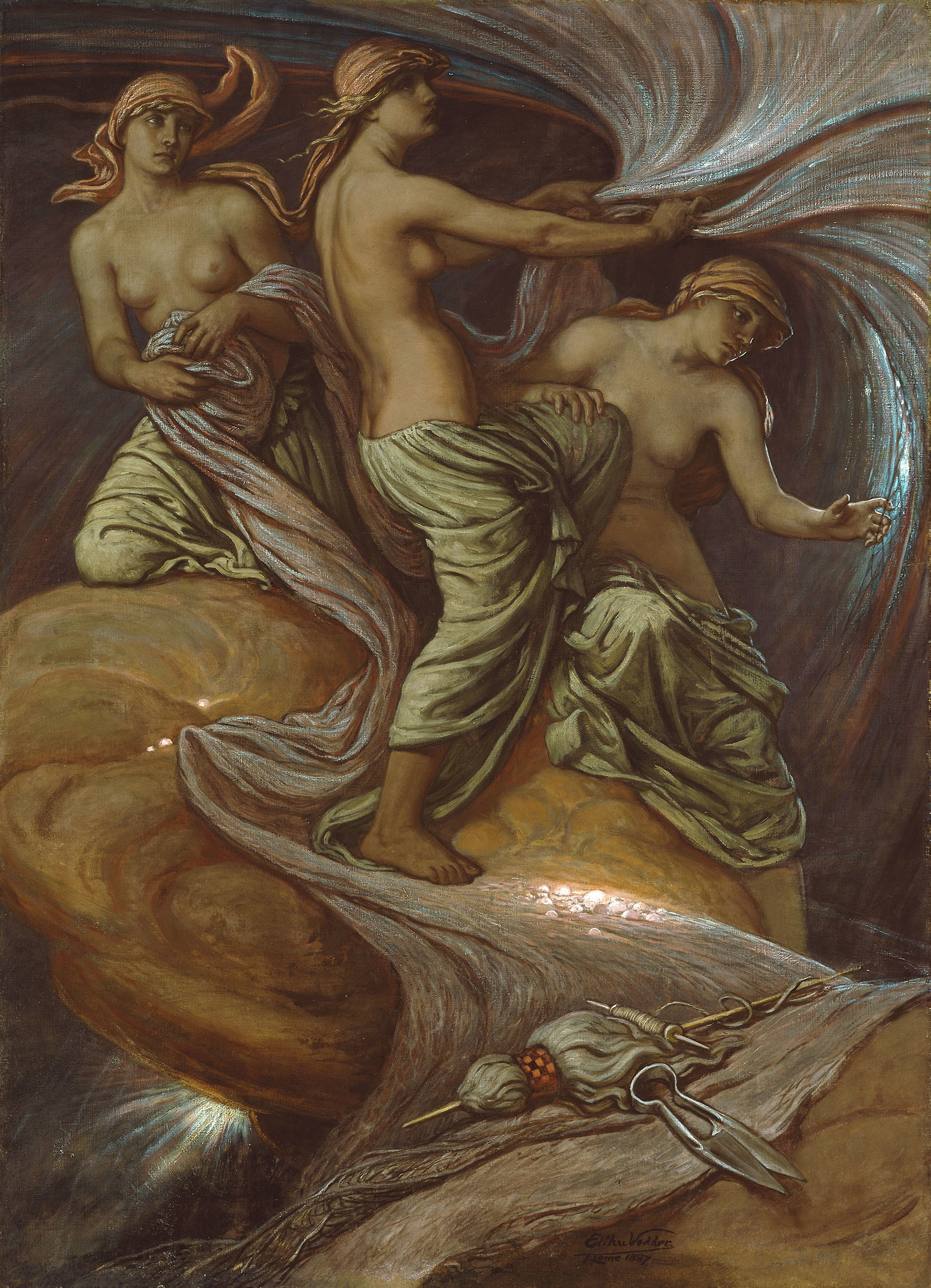
The Fates controlling the thread of life with their tools.

The Fates are a common motif in European polytheism, most frequently represented as a trio of goddesses. The Fates shape the destiny of each human, often expressed in textile metaphors such as spinning fibers into yarn, or weaving threads on a loom. The trio are generally conceived of as sisters and are often given the names Clotho, Lachesis, and Atropos, which are the names of the Moirai, the version of the Fates who appear in Greek mythology. These divine figures are often artistically depicted as beautiful maidens with consideration to their serious responsibility: the life of mortals. Poets, on the other hand, typically express the Fates as ugly and unwavering, representing the gravity of their role within the mythological and human worlds.

== Individual roles ==
The Moirai, meaning "allotted portion" or "share", separated each sister into a different role in order to handle the fates of humans. The Fates were expected to appear within three days of a mortal's birth. Clotho was the first of the three, known as "the spinner" because she wove the threads of human life while in the womb. This act is used to represent her divine duty, also incorporating pregnancies or birth when referring to her. The second Fate, Lachesis, is known as "the Allotter" or "the Receiver", given that her responsibility includes determining how much mortal life is assigned to the soul of each individual. This, in turn, determines the number of tribulations that individual is predestined to face. The final Fate, Atropos, is known as the most stubborn sister of the three, given the nickname "the un-turnable" or "the Inevitable". Atropos is expected to cut off the thread of life, completing the cycle and determining when a human will die. She is typically seen hand in hand with death and the Underworld. Once Atropos cuts the thread, each soul is sent to the Underworld where they receive judgement and are sent to one of three options: Elysium, Tartarus, or the Fields of Asphodel.

Elysium is labeled a land for the blessed, whereas those who committed horrible deeds were sent to the deepest part of the underworld, Tartarus. The mortals who lived neither an objectively good or bad life were sent to the Fields of Asphodel.

== In mythology ==
The Fates have appeared in numerous cultures with similar tales. In Greek mythology, they appear as incarnations of destiny named the Moirai. The Roman counterparts of the Moirai are known as the Parcae. In Albanian folk beliefs the Ora and Fatí are three fate goddesses, the weavers of destiny, who control the order of the universe and enforce its laws. In Albanian tradition, Ora is also regarded as a type of personal fate goddess who belongs to a single individual. The trio of Fates also appears in Slavic culture as the Rozhanitsy, figures who foretell an individual's destiny. Similar to Greek mythology, the Fates are known as incarnations of destiny called Norns in Norse mythology. The biggest variant within these cultures remains in Baltic mythology, which characterizes the Deivės Valdytojos as seven sisters who weave pieces of clothing from the lives of humans.

== Indo-European origin ==
Fates
- Norns in Norse mythology are one descendant group

Equivalents
- Albanian: Ora, Fatia
- Greek: Moirai
- Hindu: Tridevi?
- Norse: Norns
- Slavic: Rozhanitsy
- Hittite: Gulšeš
- Lithuanian: Deives Valdytojos
- English: Wyrds

The Fates are three Proto-Indo-European fate goddesses. Their names have not been reconstructed, but such a group is highly attested in descendant groups. Such goddesses spun the destinies of mankind.

Although such fate goddesses are not directly attested in the Indo-Aryan tradition, the Atharvaveda does contain an allusion comparing fate to a warp. Furthermore, the three Fates appear in nearly every other Indo-European mythology. The earliest attested set of fate goddesses are the Gulses in Hittite mythology, who were said to preside over the individual destinies of human beings. They often appear in mythical narratives alongside the goddesses Istustaya and Papaya, who, in a ritual text for the foundation of a new temple, are described sitting holding mirrors and spindles, spinning the king's thread of life.

In the Greek tradition, the Moirai ("Apportioners") are mentioned dispensing destiny in both the Iliad and the Odyssey, in which they are given the epithet Κλῶθες (Klothes, meaning "Spinners"). In Hesiod's Theogony, the Moirai are said to "give mortal men both good and ill" and their names are listed as Klotho ("Spinner"), Lachesis ("Apportioner"), and Atropos ("Inflexible"). Hesiod also describes the fates as being the daughters of the night. In his Republic, Plato records that Lachesis sings of the past, Klotho of the present, and Atropos of the future.

In Roman legend, the Parcae were three goddesses who presided over the births of children and whose names were Nona ("Ninth"), Decuma ("Tenth"), and Morta ("Death"). They too were said to spin destinies, although this may have been due to influence from Greek literature.

In the Old Norse Völuspá and Gylfaginning, the Norns are three cosmic goddesses of fate who are described sitting by the well of Urðr at the foot of the world tree Yggdrasil. (Note: The names of the individual Norns are given as Urðr ("Happened"), Verðandi ("Happening"), and Skuld ("Happen"), but M. L. West notes that these names may be the result of classical influence from Plato.) In Old Norse texts, the Norns are frequently conflated with Valkyries, who are sometimes also described as spinning. Old English texts, such as Rhyme Poem 70, and Guthlac 1350 f., reference Wyrd as a singular power that "weaves" destinies.

Later texts mention the Wyrds as a group, with Geoffrey Chaucer referring to them as "the Werdys that we clepyn Destiné" in The Legend of Good Women. (Note: They also, most famously, appear as the Three Witches in William Shakespeare's Macbeth (c. 1606).) A goddess spinning appears in a bracteate from southwest Germany and a relief from Trier shows three mother goddesses, with two of them holding distaffs. Tenth-century German ecclesiastical writings denounce the popular belief in three sisters who determined the course of a man's life at his birth.

An Old Irish hymn attests to seven goddesses who were believed to weave the thread of destiny, which demonstrates that these spinster fate-goddesses were present in Celtic mythology as well.

A Lithuanian folktale recorded in 1839 recounts that a man's fate is spun at his birth by seven goddesses known as the deivės valdytojos and used to hang a star in the sky; when he dies, his thread snaps and his star falls as a meteor.

In Latvian folk songs, a goddess called the Láima is described as weaving a child's fate at its birth. Although she is usually only one goddess, the Láima sometimes appears as three.

The three spinning fate goddesses appear in Slavic traditions in the forms of the Russian Rožanicy, the Czech and Slovak Sudičky, the Bulgarian Narenčnice or Urisnice, the Polish Rodzanice, the Croatian Rodjenice, the Serbian Sudjenice, and the Slovene Rojenice.

In Albanian folk beliefs the Ora and Fatí are the weavers of destiny, who control the order of the universe and enforce its laws. They are described as a group of three goddesses who gather in the night to perform the task of "determining the child's fate at birth" and distribute their favours upon the child. The inhabitants of the Dukagjini Mountains believed that three types of Fates existed: "e Bardha (The White One) distributes good luck and wishes humans well, e Verdha (The Yellow One) distributes bad luck and casts evil spells, and e Zeza (The Black One) who decides death".

== In the visual arts ==
Considering the roles of each divine sister, Clotho is typically portrayed as a younger woman because of her relationship with the birth of humans, whereas Atropos is pictured as an old woman because of her hand in the death of mortals. Each sister has been pictured with a tangible representation of their power: Clotho with thread, Lachesis with an eye glass, and Atropos with scissors. The Fates make a specific appearance within the artwork of Francisco de Goya's black paintings, as in Atropos. These were a series of 14 pieces completed by the artist nearing the later stages of his life. Their dark tone, literally and figuratively, capture the Fates holding an individual hostage as they are deciding his destiny.

Sculptor, Louis François Roubiliac portrays through his art how the Fates represent vitality and the celebration of life. A famous creation of Roubiliac was a sculpture he created to commemorate the life of the late Mary Churchill, the Second Duchess of Montagu. Roubiliac sculpted the Three Fates surrounded by children and flowers, to represent the importance of the Fates at the start of life as well. The Moirai are also depicted on the François Vase whose creation dates back to 570 BCE. The François Vase was created by Kleitias and Ergotimos. On the surface of the vase are depictions of many ancient Greek deities including the Moirai. While each of the Moirai appear differently on the vase, they are established under one name, which demonstrates their unity.

More recently, Anne-Katrin Altwein depicted the divine sisters through sculptures that originally resided in the entrance of a German hospital as a means of creative inspiration to patients. Altwein sculpted Clotho as a pregnant woman as opposed to simply holding the thread of life in order to present her in a more positive light. The sculptures have since been moved to the city center of Jena, also home to the same hospital.

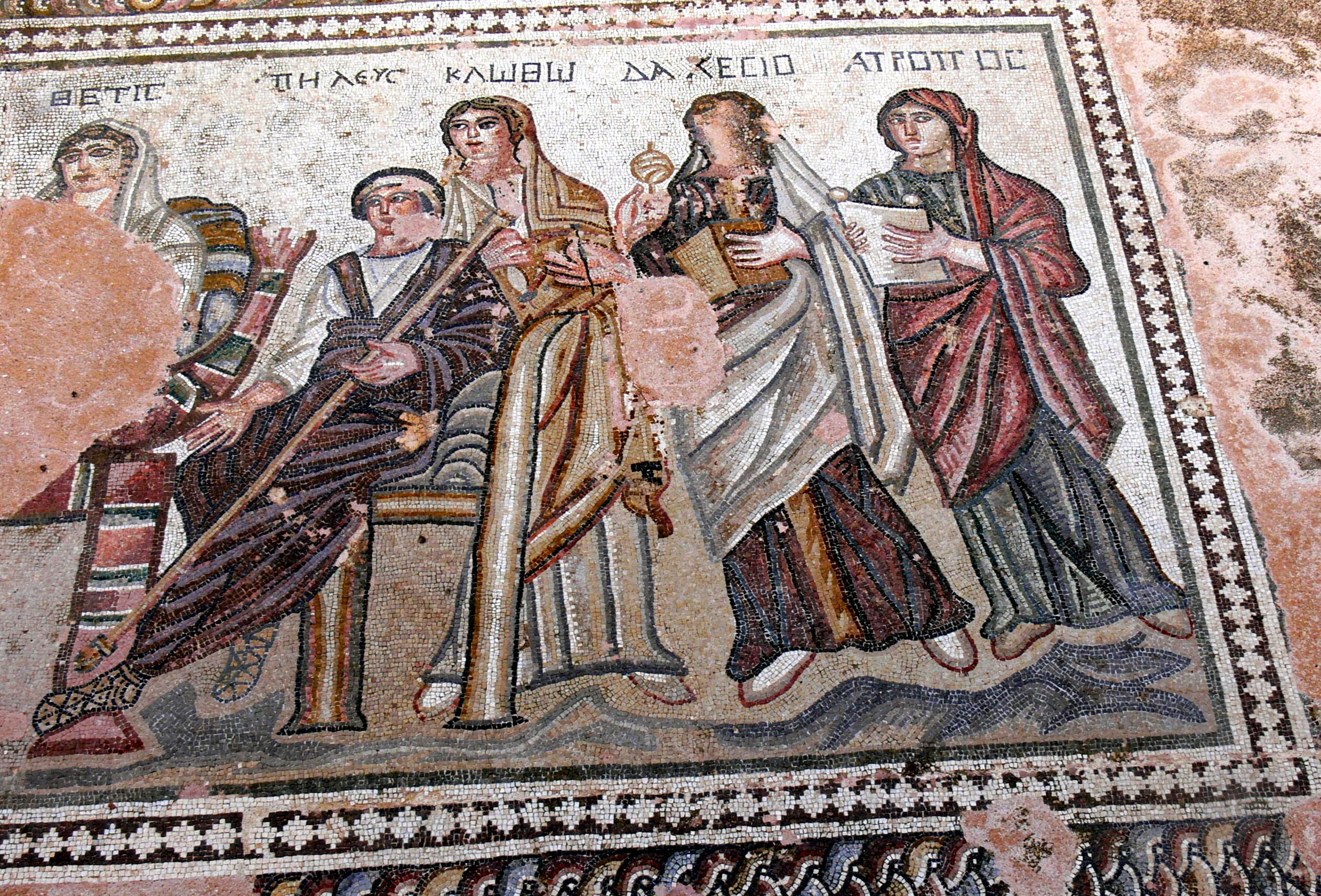
Late second-century AD Greek mosaic from the House of Theseus at Paphos Archaeological Park on Cyprus showing the three Moirai: Klotho, Lachesis, and Atropos, standing behind Peleus and Thetis, the parents of Achilles.

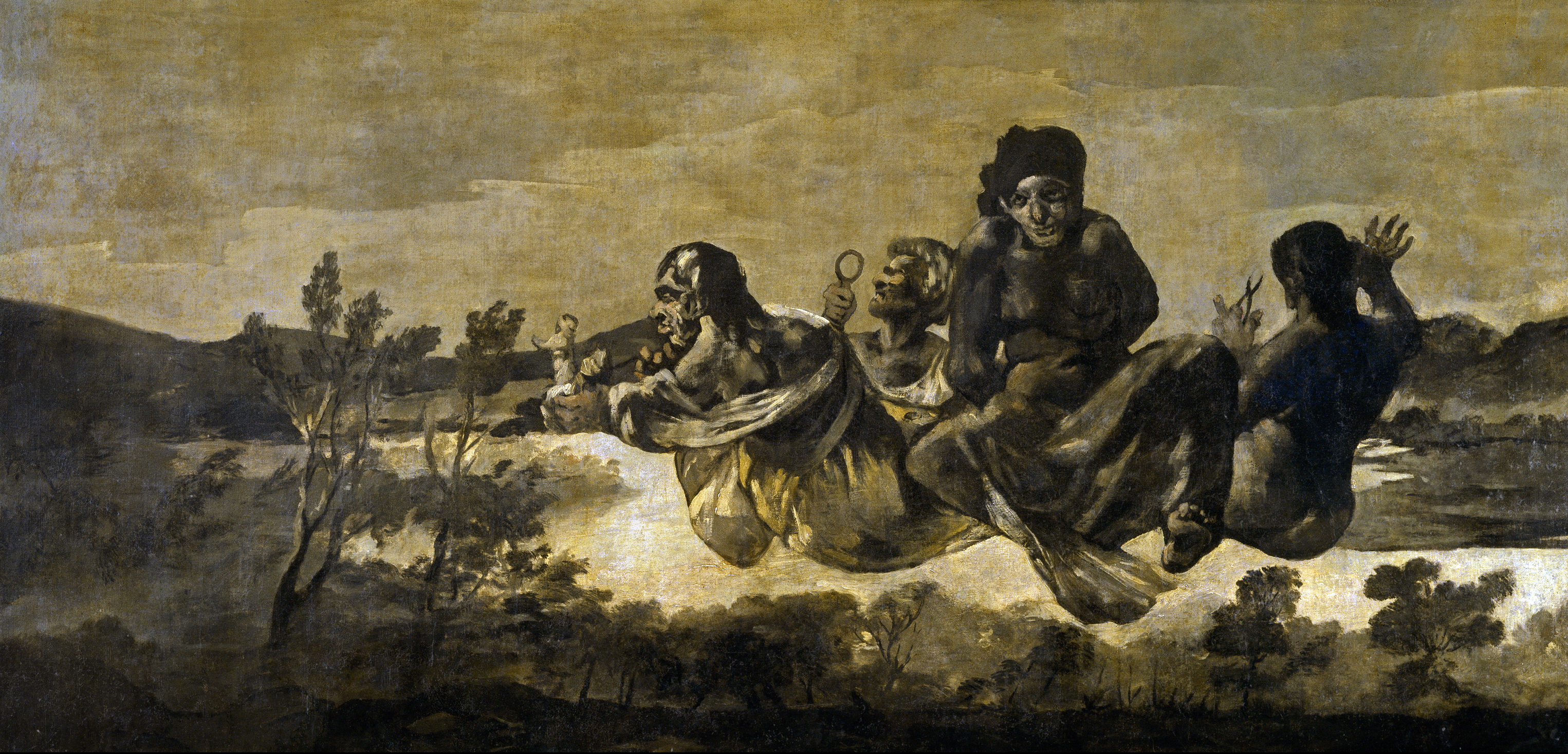
A depiction of the Fates, specifically Atropos, exercising her power on a captive man.

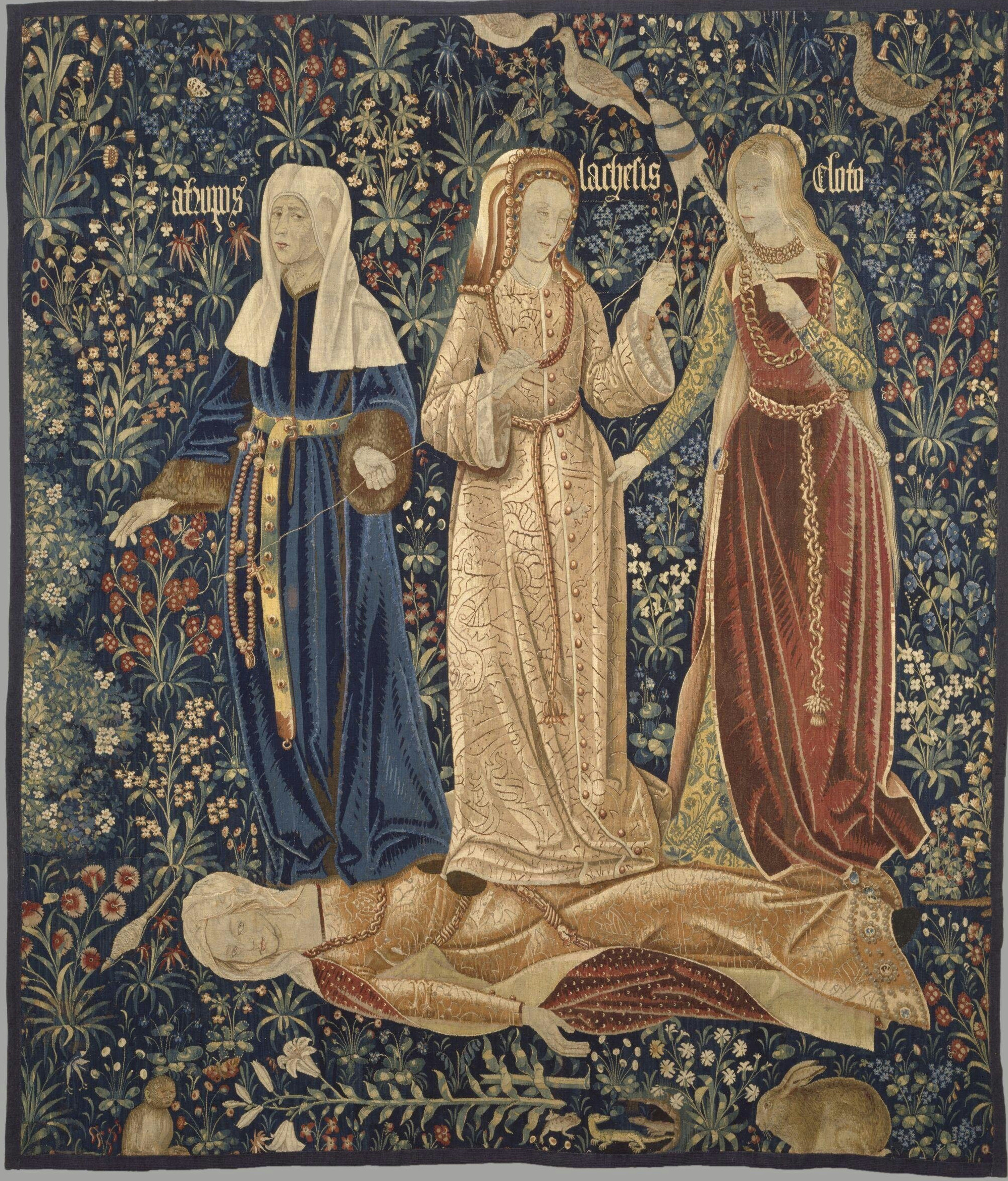
The three fates, Clotho, Lachesis and Atropos, who spin, draw out and cut the thread of life. (Flemish tapestry, Victoria and Albert Museum, London)

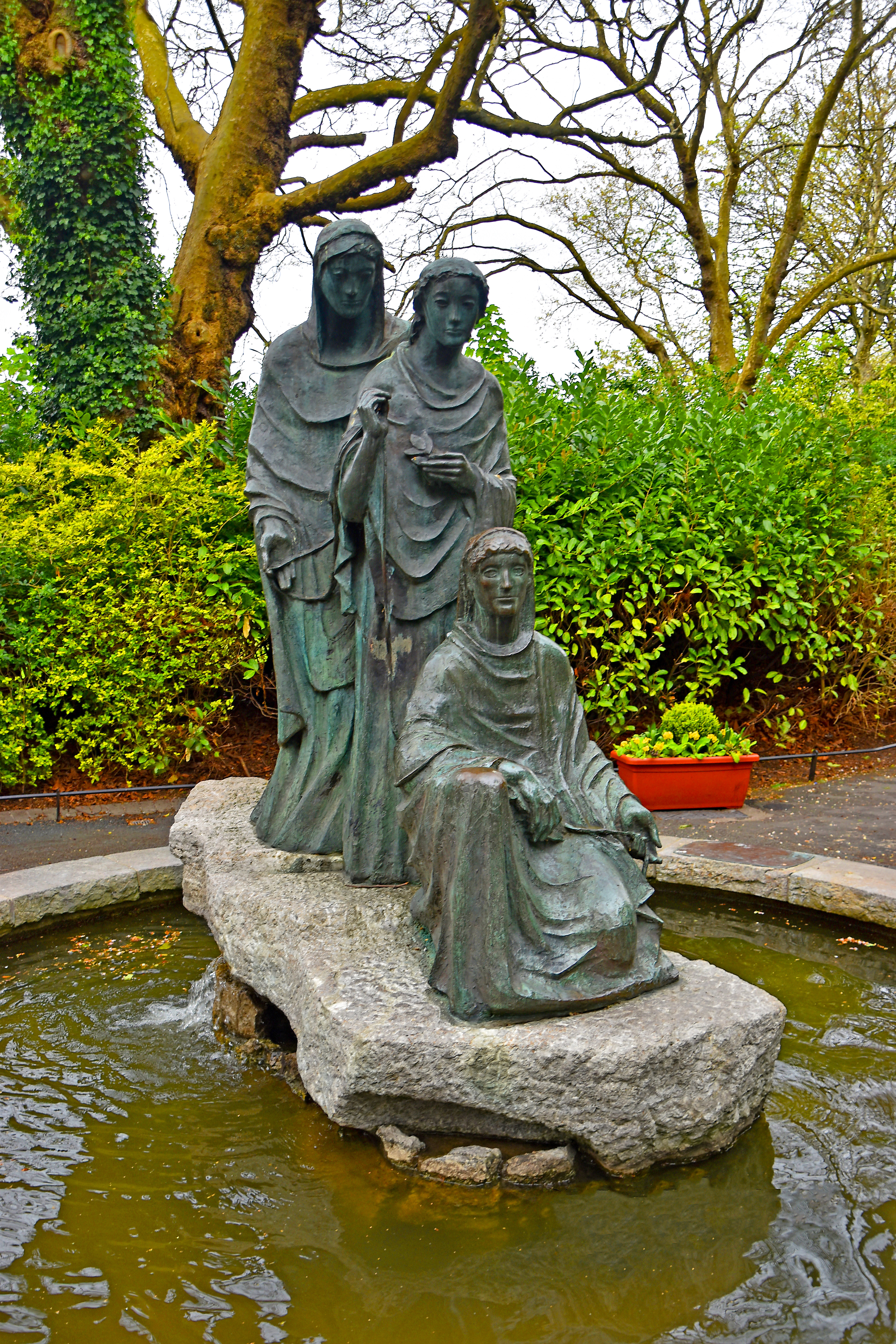
The Three Fates fountain in St. Stephen's Green in Dublin, Ireland
(gift from Germany, the fountain with figures by Joseph Wackerle was erected in 1954.)

== In fiction ==
This motif has been replicated in fictional accounts, such as:

- The Three Witches, characters in Shakespeare's Macbeth
- In his poem "Howl", Allen Ginsberg laments the ravages of "the three old shrews of fate the one eyed shrew of the heterosexual dollar the one eyed shrew that winks out of the womb and the one eyed shrew that does nothing but sit on her ass and snip the intellectual golden threads of the craftsman's loom".
- Orddu, Orwen and Orgoch, characters in Lloyd Alexander's 1960s book series The Chronicles of Prydain.
- The Fates, characters in Disney's Hercules
- The Kindly Ones, characters in "The Sandman" series of comics written by Neil Gaiman
- The Fates/Moirai, characters in various books by Rick Riordan in the Percy Jackson and the Olympians, Heroes of Olympus and The Trials of Apollo series
- Both the Moirai, under the name "Sisters of Fate", and the Norns appear in the God of War video game series; the Sisters of Fate appear as antagonists in the Greek-based game God of War II (2007) while the Norns appear as minor characters in the Norse-based game, God of War Ragnarök (2022).
- The Fates, characters in Anaïs Mitchell's folk-ballad-turned-Broadway-musical Hadestown (2010, 2016, 2018).
- The Fates, primary antagonists of season five of the superhero television series Legends of Tomorrow
- The Fates/Moirai, referenced in Edward P. Willey's poem The Moirai as “the three withered maiden aunts”.
- The Fates appear in another Greek-based video game, Hades II as minor characters.

== See also ==
- Matrones
- Moirai
- Norns
- Parcae
- Triple goddess
- Ursitoare

== Bibliography ==
- Doja, Albert (2005). "Mythology and Destiny" (PDF). Anthropos. 100 (2): 449–462. doi:10.5771/0257-9774-2005-2-449. JSTOR 40466549.
- Kondi, Bledar (2017). "Un regard critique sur l'ethnographie de la mort en Albanie". Ethnologie française. 166 (2): 277–288. doi:10.3917/ethn.172.0277.
- West, Martin L. (2007). Indo-European Poetry and Myth. Oxford, England: Oxford University Press. ISBN 978-0-19-928075-9.
