= Clotho =

One of the Fates of Greek mythology

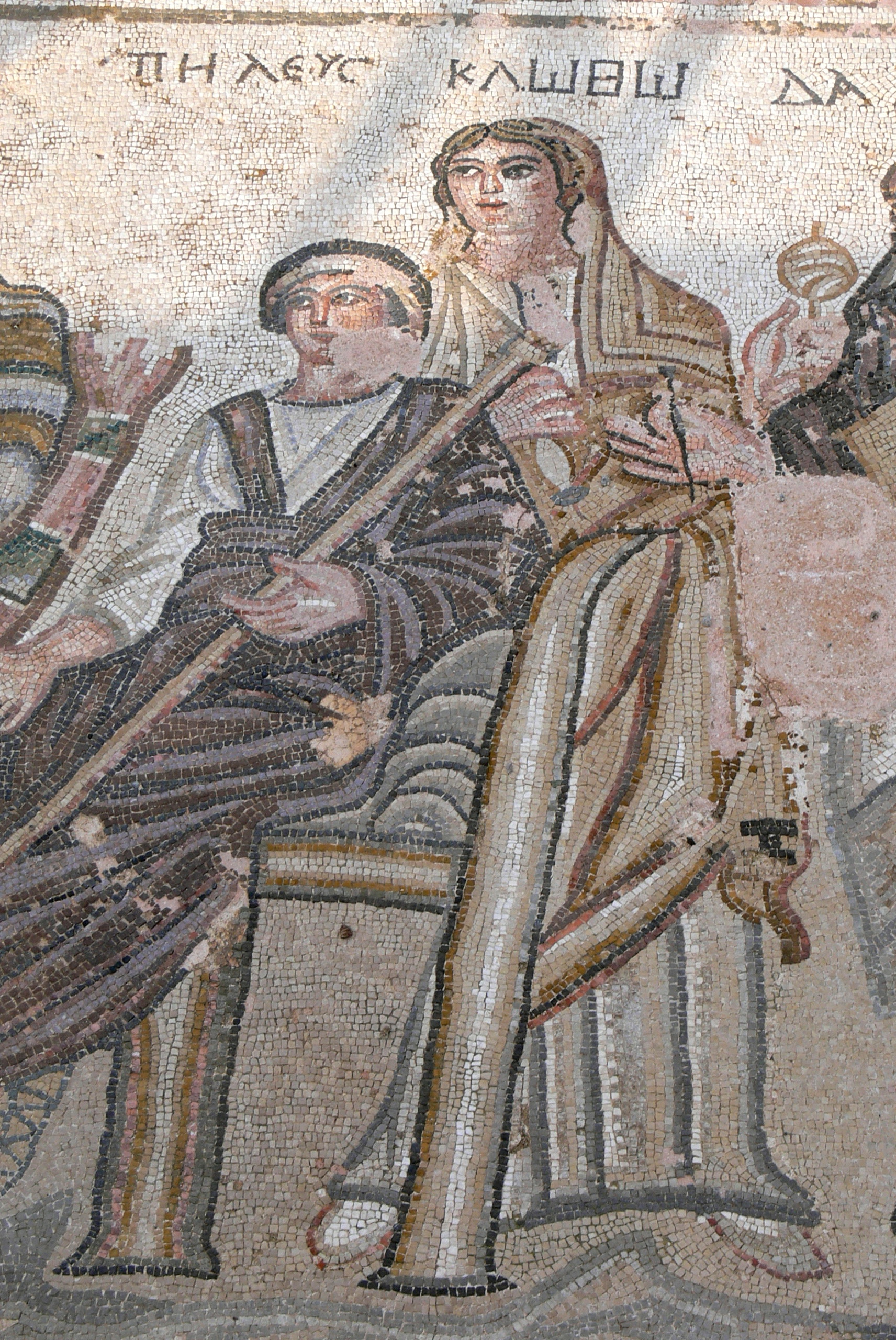
Clotho and Peleus from a Roman mosaic from Cyprus, 5th-century AD

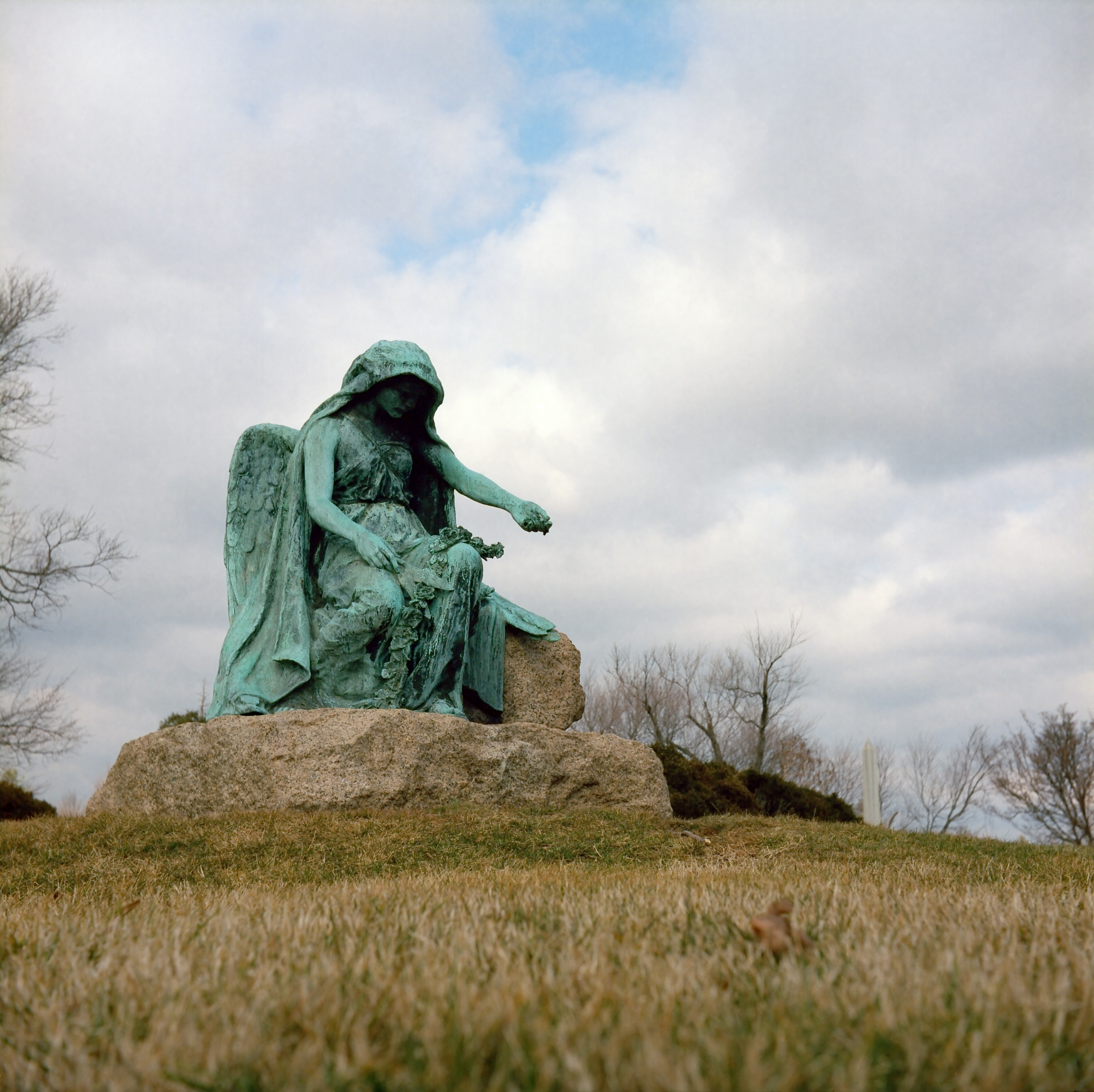
Statue in Druid Ridge Cemetery, near Baltimore, Maryland, that represents the Greek fate Clotho

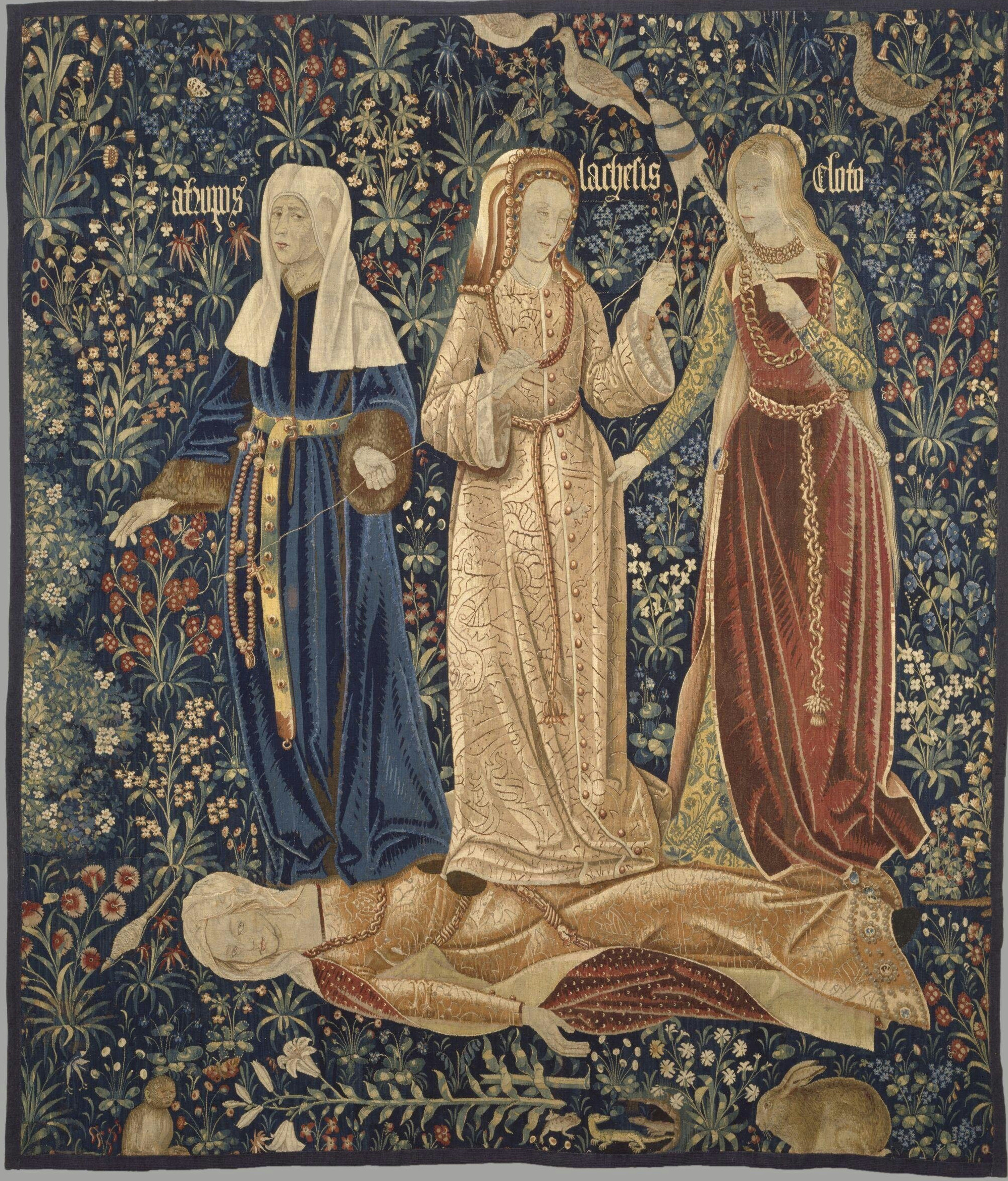
The Triumph of Death, or The Three Fates. Flemish tapestry (probably Brussels, c. 1510–1520). Victoria and Albert Museum, London.

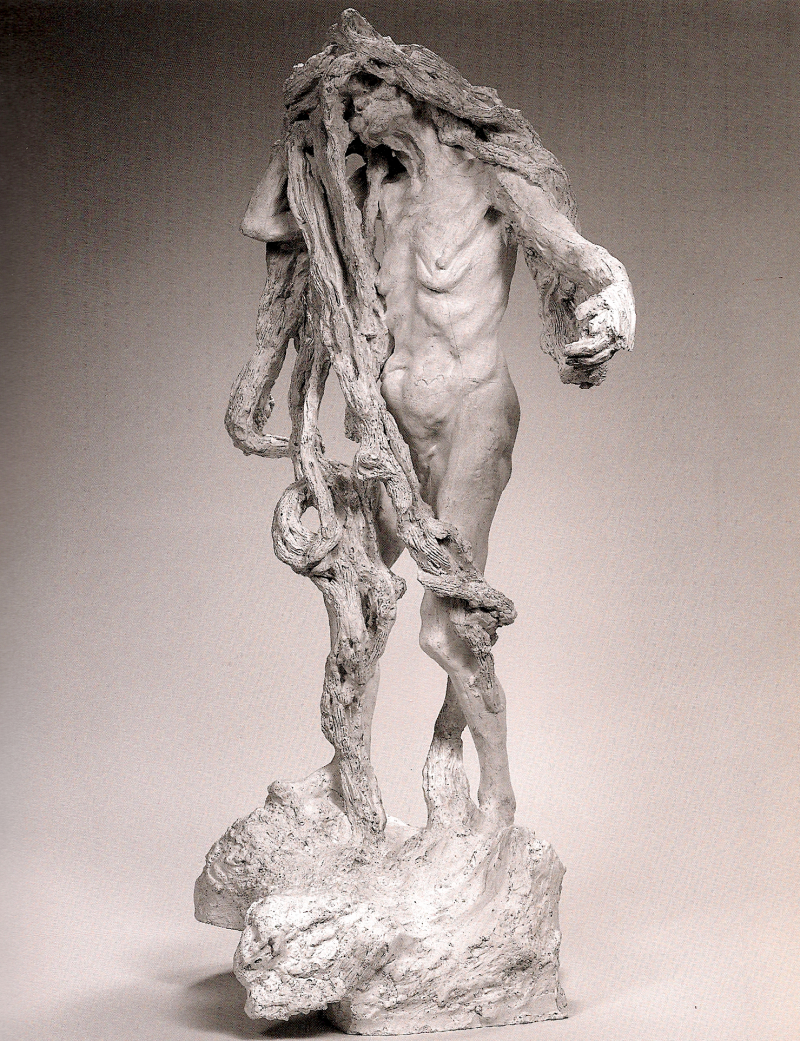
Clotho, 1893 by Camille Claudel

Clotho (/ˈkloʊθoʊ/; Greek: Κλωθώ) or Klotho is a mythological figure. She was one of the Three Fates or Moirai. In ancient Greek mythology, she spins the thread of human life while her sisters draw out (Lachesis) and cut (Atropos) the thread. She is generally considered the youngest of the three Fates, although in some later sources, such as Giovanni Boccaccio’s Genealogia Deorum Gentilium, she is described as the eldest among the Moirai. She also made major decisions, such as when a person was born, thus in effect controlling people's lives. This power enabled her not only to choose who was born, but also to decide when deities or mortals were to be saved or put to death. For example, Clotho resurrected Pelops when his father killed him. Her Roman equivalent is Nona.

As one of the three Fates, her influence in Greek mythology was significant. Along with her sisters and Hermes, Clotho was given credit for creating the alphabet for their people. While Clotho and her sisters were worshiped as goddesses, their representation as fates is more central to their role in mythology. Thread represented human life and her decisions represented the fate of all people in society.

Clotho and her sisters are sometimes associated with the Keres and Erinyes, which are other deity groups in Greek mythology.

== Genealogy ==
According to Hesiod's Theogony, Clotho and her sisters (Atropos and Lachesis) are the daughters of Nyx (Night), without the assistance of a father. Later in the same work (ll. 901-906) they are said to have been born of Zeus and Themis.

According to Plato's Republic, Clotho and her sisters (Atropos and Lachesis) are the daughters of Ananke (Necessity).

In Roman mythology it was believed that Clotho (Nona) was the daughter of Uranus and Gaia. Theodontius affirms that the fates were created together with the nature of things. Cicero states that she and her sisters were daughters of Erebus and Nyx.

== Mythological narratives ==
As one of the Three Fates, Clotho participated in creating the alphabet with Hermes, forced the goddess Aphrodite into making love with other gods, weakened the monster Typhon with poison fruit, persuaded Zeus to kill Asclepius with a bolt of lightning, and aided the deities in their war with the Giants by killing Agrius and Thoas with bronze clubs.

Ariadne is similar to Clotho in that she carries a ball of thread, much like Clotho's spindle..

=== The Ivory Shoulder ===
Clotho also used her life-giving powers in the myth of Tantalus, the man who had slain and prepared his son Pelops for a dinner party with the deities. When the deities had discovered what Tantalus had done, they put the remaining pieces of Pelops in a cauldron. Clotho brought him back to life, with the exception of a shoulder that had been eaten by Demeter and therefore, was replaced by a chunk of ivory..

=== The Fooling of the Fates ===
Clotho, along with her sisters, was tricked into becoming intoxicated by Alcestis. Alcestis, who had two children with Admetus, became extremely saddened when Admetus became very sick and eventually died. Alcestis used Clotho's drunkenness to try to get her husband back. The Three Fates explained that if a replacement for Admetus could be found, then he could be released from the Underworld. A substitute was not found so Alcestis offered herself up to be the replacement in order to bring her husband back to life. As the agreement had been met, Alcestis quickly began to grow sick and sank into her grave as Admetus came back to life. At the last instant, Heracles arrived at the home of Admetus. When Thanatos came to take Alcestis away, Heracles wrestled him and forced him to return Alcestis, allowing Admetus and Alcestis to be reunited.

=== The Calydonian Boar Hunt ===
A tale in which the Fates played an integral part was that of Meleager and the Brand, which W. H. D. Rouse describes in Gods, Heroes and Men of Ancient Greece. Meleager led a hunting party to slay the Calydonian Boar, which was set loose upon Calydon by Artemis. She was displeased at the Calydonian king for neglecting to make a proper sacrifice to her. After slaying the boar, Meleager presented the skin to a woman present at the party named Atalanta, with whom he was smitten. His uncles were also part of the adventurous group, and they were upset by Meleager's gift to Atalanta. They believed a woman should not have the skin of the boar. As a result of this disagreement, Meleager slew his uncles, who were his mother's brothers. She was so enraged that she decided to take vengeance upon him. She remembered a visit that the Fates had made a week after Meleager was born. A Fate had told Althaia that her son's life would expire when the burning log in the fireplace ceased to flame. She had promptly extinguished the flames, preserved the log and hid it safely. In her rage over the loss of her brothers, she lit the log to punish Meleager. As the log was consumed in flame, Meleager burned to death.
