= Lachesis =

One of the Fates of Greek Mythology

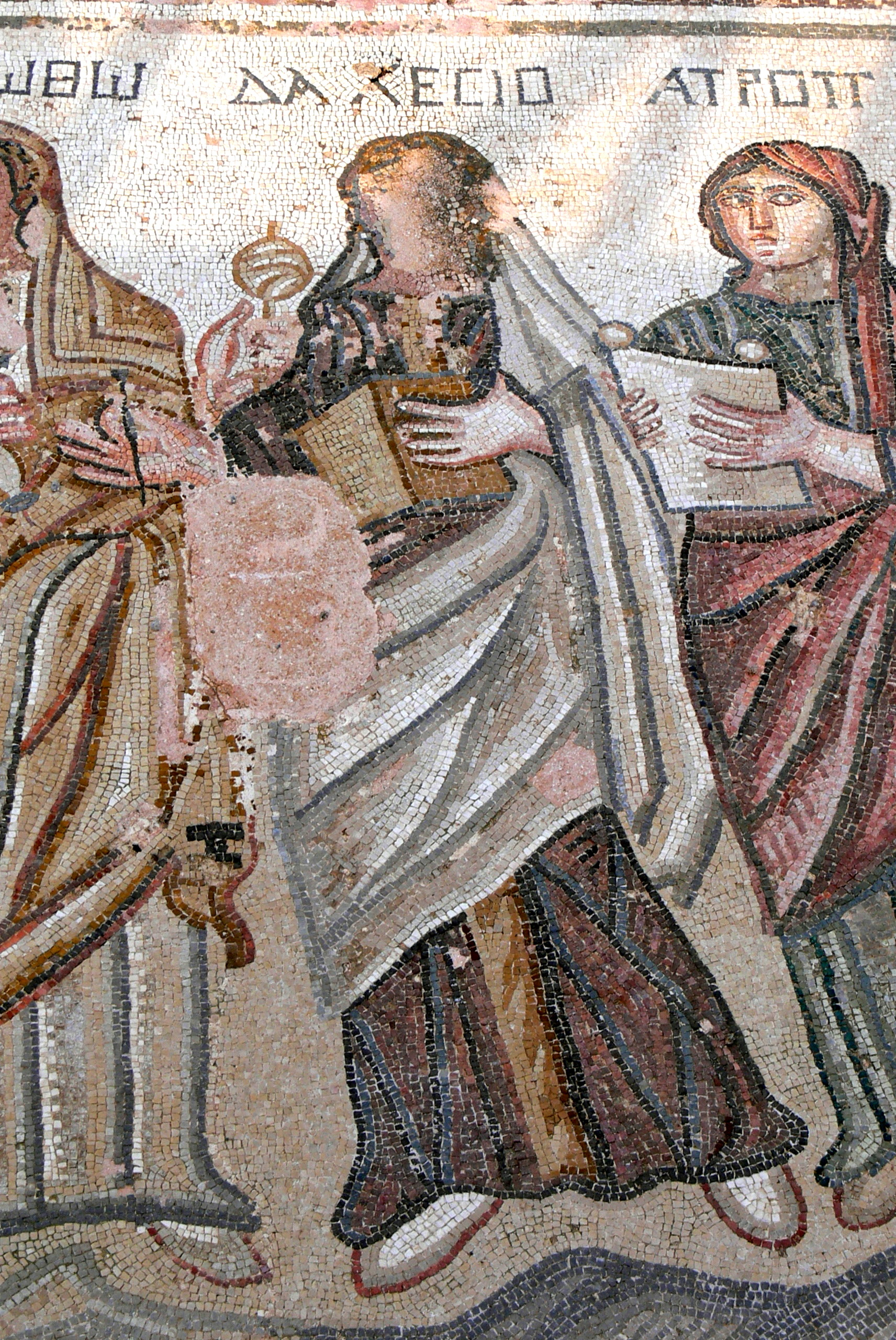
Lachesis from a fifth-century Roman mosaic from Paphos, Cyprus.

Lachesis (/ˈlækɪsɪs/ LAK-iss-iss; Ancient Greek: Λάχεσις, romanized: Lákhesis, lit. 'disposer of lots'; from λαγχάνω lanchánō, 'to obtain by lot, by fate, or by the will of the gods'), in ancient Greek religion, was the middle of the Three Fates, or Moirai, alongside her sisters Clotho and Atropos. Normally seen clothed in white, Lachesis is the measurer of the thread spun on Clotho's spindle, and in some texts, determines Destiny. Her Roman equivalent was Decima. Lachesis apportioned the thread of life, determining the length of each lifespan. She measured the thread of life with her rod and is also said to choose a person's destiny during the measurement. Myths attest that she and her sisters appear within three days of a baby's birth to decide the child's fate.

== Origin ==
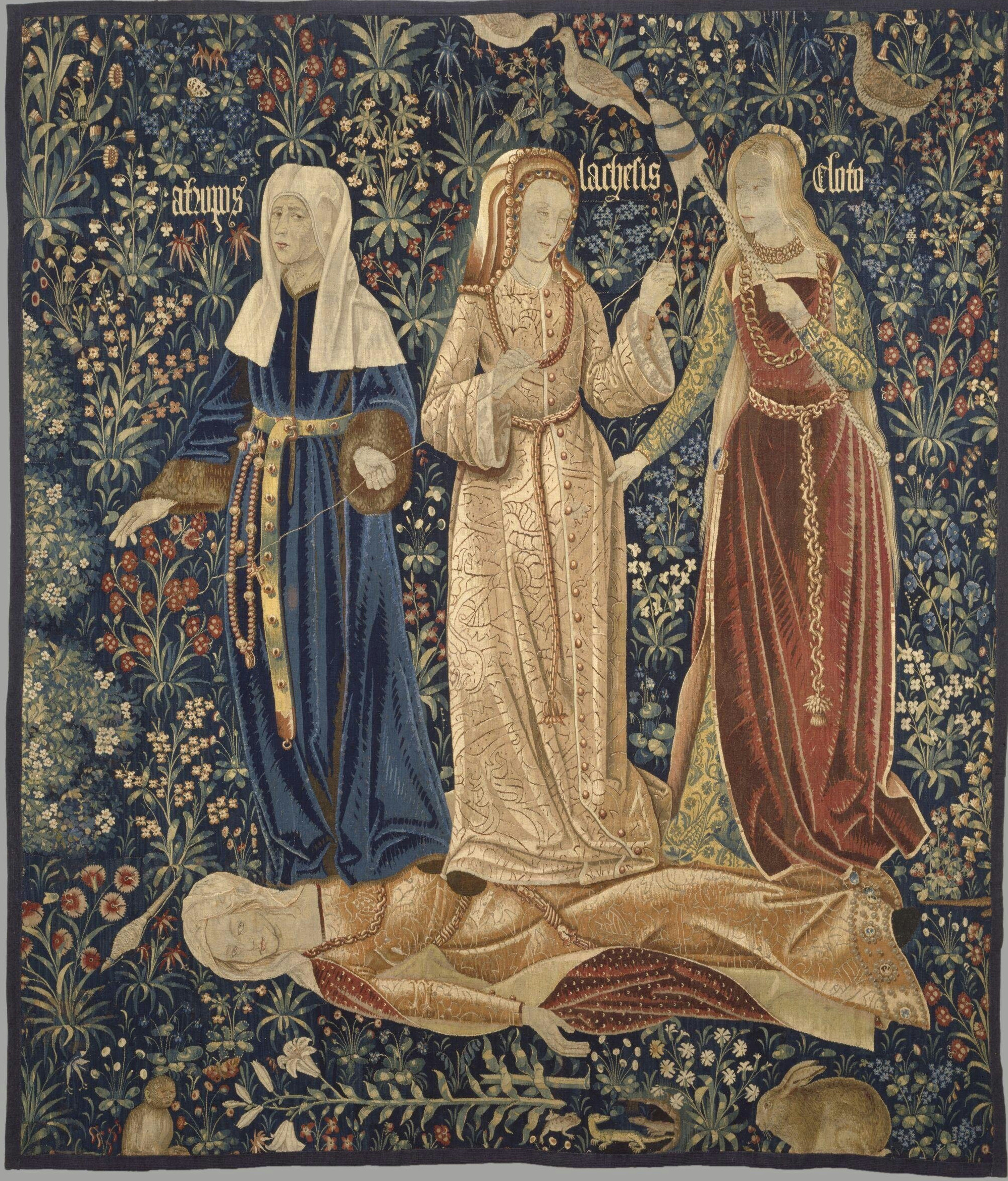
Lachesis stands in the center as she and her sisters spin, draw out, and cut the thread of life. (Flemish tapestry, Victoria and Albert Museum, London)

According to Hesiod's Theogony, Lachesis and her sisters were the daughters of Nyx (Night), though later in the same work (ll. 901-906) they are said to have been born of Zeus and Themis. Lachesis is also mentioned in the tenth book of the Republic of Plato as the daughter of Necessity. She instructs the souls who are about to choose their next life, assign them lots, and presents them all of the kinds, human and animal, from which they may choose their next life.

== Dispute of origin ==
In Genealogia Deorum Gentilium, the Italian Renaissance writer Giovanni Boccaccio wrote that Lachesis was the second of the Moirai. Clotho, Lachesis and Atropos, as previously mentioned in the section on the Dispute, were daughters of Demogorgon. Cicero, however, calls them the Parcae in De Natura Deorum, where he states that they were daughters of Erebus and Night. It seems preferable, however, to follow Theodontius, who affirms that they were created together with the nature of things. Elsewhere, where Cicero speaks of the Parca in the singular, he also calls her the daughter of Erebus and Night. Seneca, in his letters to Lucilius, also calls them the Parcae, citing the saying of Cleanthes: “The Fates lead those who are willing and drag those who are unwilling.” In this, he describes not only their office that is, to guide all living beings but also to compel them, as if all things occurred by necessity. Lachesis was the one who measured the thread of life, determining how long each mortal would live.

== Namesake ==
120 Lachesis, a main-belt asteroid.

Lachesis is a genus of pit vipers sometimes called bushmasters. It includes the largest venomous snake in the Western Hemisphere, and the largest vipers in the world.
