= Kallone =

Figure in Plato's Symposium

Kallone (Ancient Greek: Καλλονή, lit. 'beauty') is one third of the Greek trio of gods comprising Fate, Birth and Beauty; or Moira, Eileithyia and Kallone respectively. She is described in Plato's Symposium as an aspect of birth:

This thing, pregnancy and bringing to birth, is divine, and it is immortal in the animal that is mortal. It is impossible for this to happen in the unfitting; and the ugly is unfitting with everything divine, but the beautiful is fitting. So Kallone is the Moira and Eileithyia for birth.

She is described by Seth Benardete as a cult name for Artemis-Hecate.
