= Atropos =

One of the Fates of Greek mythology

- Goddess of Fate
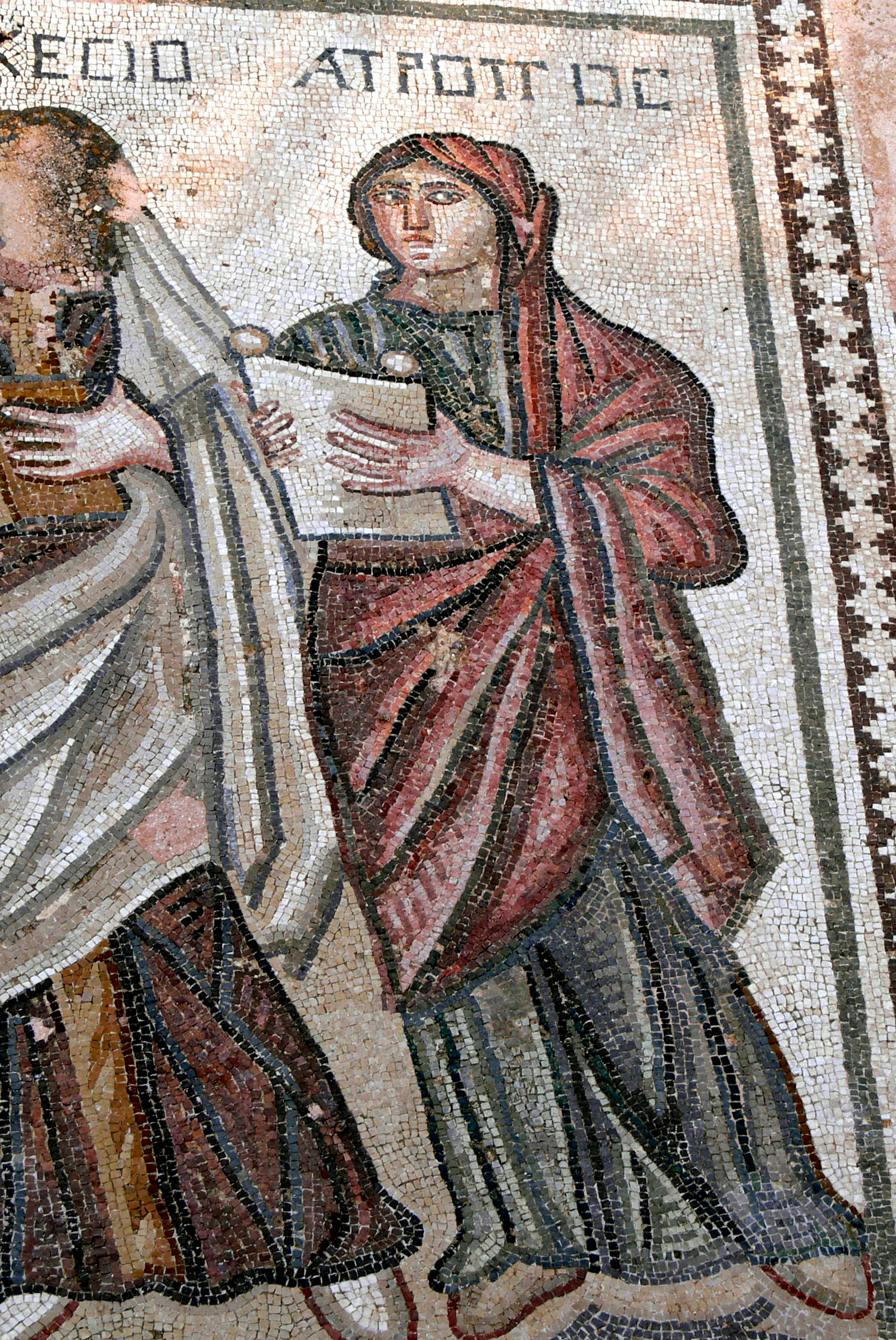
- Atropos on a fifth-century Byzantine mosaic from Paphos
- Abode: Mount Olympus
- Symbol: Scissors

Genealogy
- Parents: Erebus (father); Themis or Nyx (mother)
- Siblings: Lachesis, Clotho, various paternal half-siblings

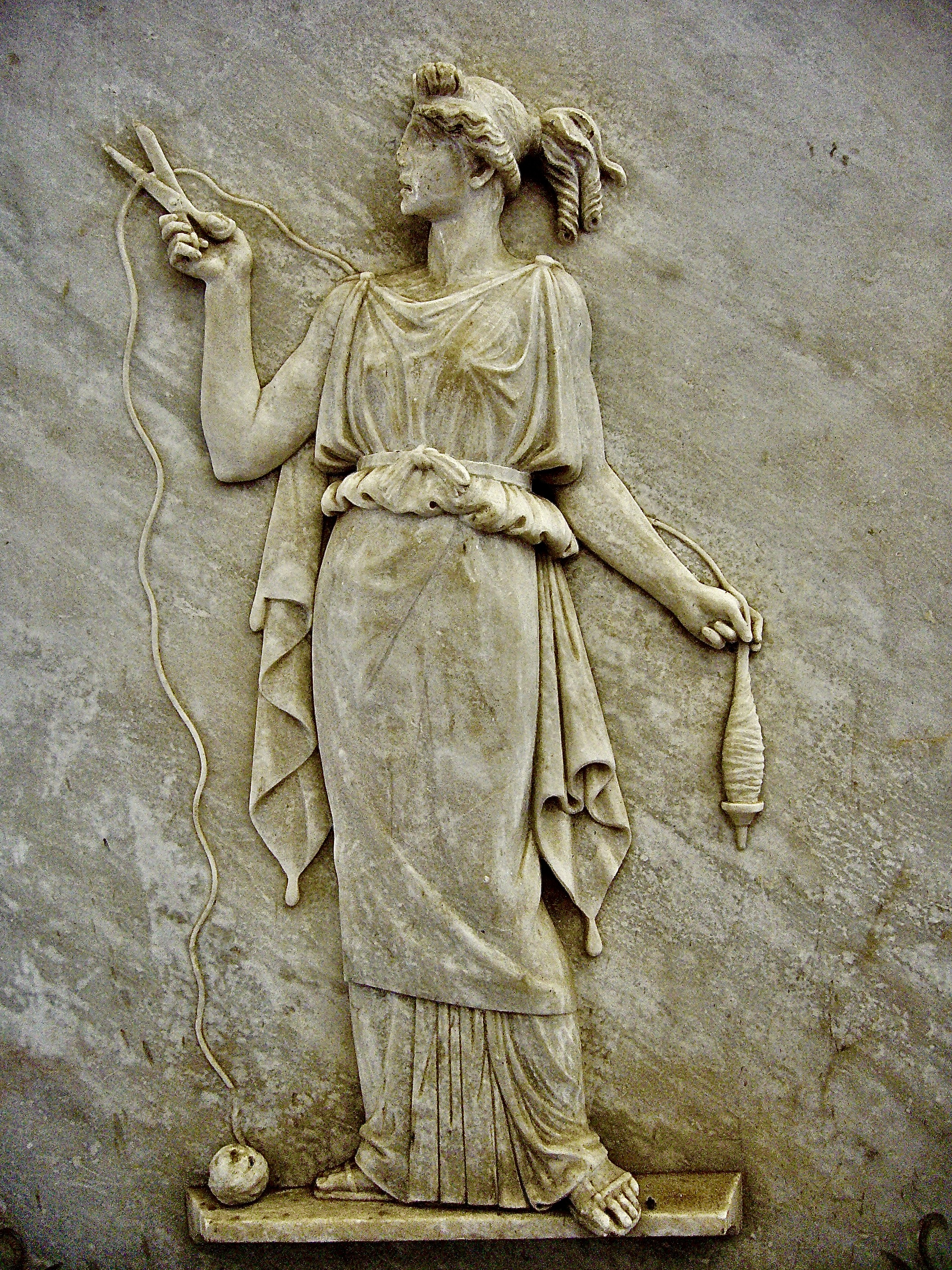
Modern Greek, Parian marble bas relief depicting Atropos severing the thread of life

Atropos (/ˈætrəpɒs, -pəs/; Ancient Greek: Ἄτροπος "without turn"), in Greek mythology, was the third of the Three Fates or Moirai, goddesses of fate and destiny. Her Roman equivalent was Morta.

Atropos was one of the Three Fates and was known as "the Inflexible One." It was Atropos who chose the manner of death and ended the life of mortals by cutting their threads. She worked along with her two sisters, Clotho, who spun the thread, and Lachesis, who measured the length. Atropos has been featured in several stories, such as those of Atalanta and Achilles.

== Origin ==
Her origin, along with the other two fates, is uncertain, although some called them the daughters of the night. It is clear, however, that at a certain period they ceased to be concerned only with death and also became those powers who decided what may happen to individuals. Although Zeus was the chief Greek god and their father, he was still subject to the decisions of the Fates, and thus the executor of destiny, rather than its source. According to Hesiod's Theogony, Atropos and her sisters (Clotho and Lachesis) were the daughters of Erebus (Darkness) and Nyx (Night) and sisters to Thanatos and Hypnos, though later in the same work (ll. 901–906) they are said to have been of Zeus and Themis.

== Dispute of origin ==
In the ancient Greek poem, The Shield of Heracles, Atropos is referred to as the oldest and smallest of the three fates. This description is uncommon among references to Atropos. It is uncommon in ancient mentions of her in more ways than one as it turns out, including this fate's moniker. Plato may be behind the creation of Atropos as many of the early descriptions of the fates have Aesa (Ancient Greek: Αἶσα) as the name of this third fate, although there is still no clear consensus. The inconsistent nature of these accounts make it difficult to know for sure whether or not Aesa or Atropos is the best name to use when talking about the third fate, but evidence seems to point to Aesa being the more commonly used name earlier on, with Atropos gaining popularity later.

Although later the order of birth of the Parcae changes, in Genealogia Deorum Gentilium, the Italian Renaissance writer Giovanni Boccaccio wrote that Atropos was the youngest of the Moirai. Clotho, Lachesis and Atropos, as previously mentioned in the section on the Dispute, were daughters of Demogorgon. Cicero, however, calls them the Parcae in De Natura Deorum, where he states that they were daughters of Erebus and Night. It seems preferable, however, to follow Theodontius, who affirms that they were created together with the nature of things. Elsewhere, where Cicero speaks of the Parca in the singular, he also calls her the daughter of Erebus and Night. Seneca, in his letters to Lucilius, also calls them the Parcae, citing the saying of Cleanthes: “The Fates lead those who are willing and drag those who are unwilling.” In this, he describes not only their office that is, to guide all living beings but also to compel them, as if all things occurred by necessity. Atropos was the one who cut the thread of life, bringing each mortal’s destiny to its inevitable end.

== References in scientific nomenclature ==
- Carolus Linnaeus coined the solanaceous genus name Atropa from the name Atropos in his creation of the binomial Atropa bella-donna for the plant commonly known, in English, as deadly nightshade - in reference to the plant's death-dealing (i.e. intensely poisonous) properties.
- The anticholinergic tropane alkaloid Atropine (still used in medicine to this day), was so named from its first being isolated from Atropa bella-donna.
- The specific name of the venomous snake, Bitis atropos, refers to Atropos.
- The African Death's-head hawkmoth, Acherontia atropos, also bears the specific name Atropos, here applied in reference - not to its toxicity - but to the macabre similarity of the white mark on its thorax to a deaths head or human skull.
- 273 Atropos, a main-belt asteroid.
