= Moirai =

Personifications of fate in Greek mythology

- Personifications of the fates
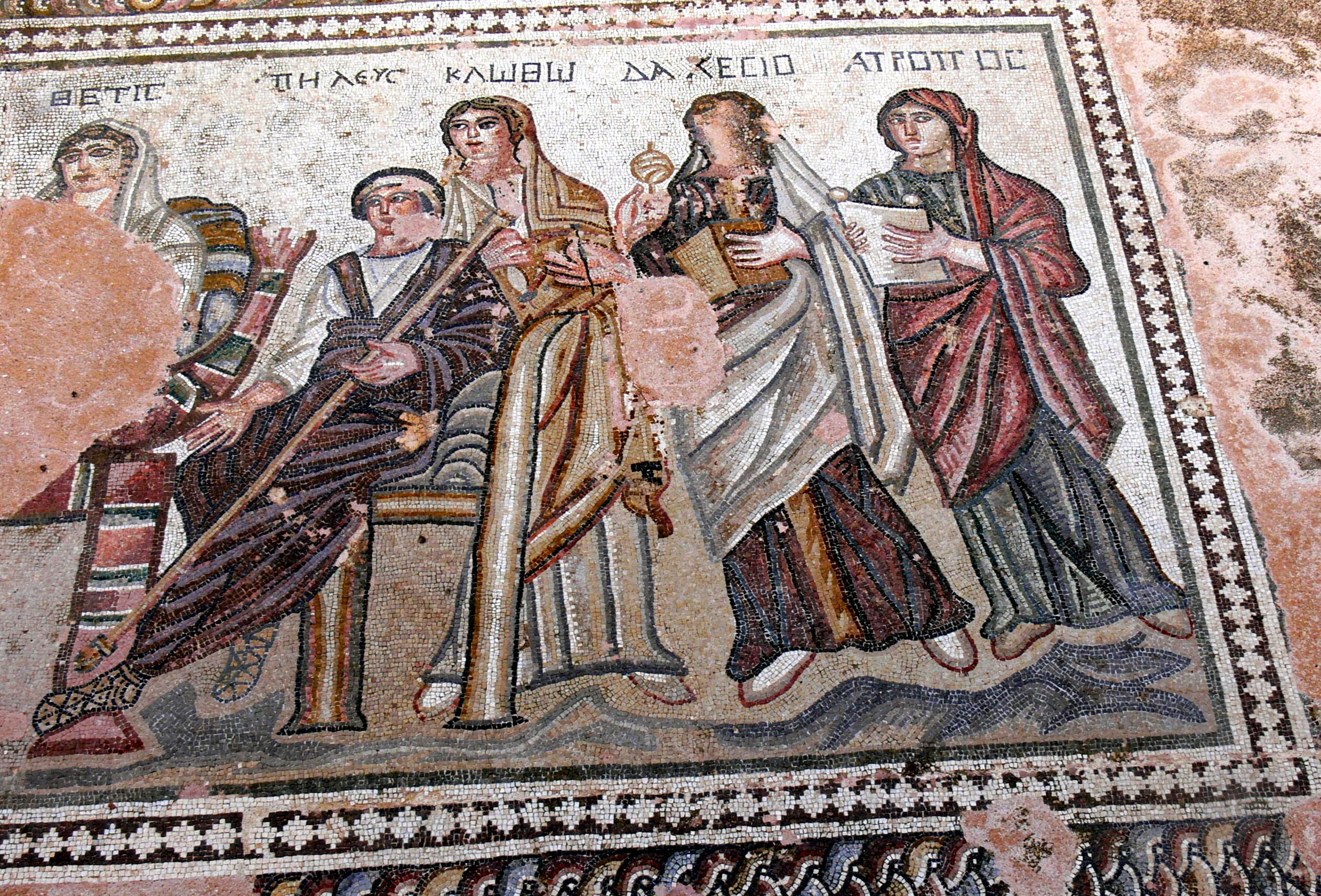
- Late second-century Greek mosaic from the House of Theseus (at Paphos Archaeological Park, Cyprus), showing the three Moirai: Clotho, Lachesis, and Atropos, standing behind Peleus and Thetis, the parents of Achilles
- Other names: Clotho; Lachesis; Atropos
- Symbol: Thread, dove, spindle, scissors
- Parents: Nyx; Zeus and Themis; Ananke

In ancient Greek religion and mythology, the Moirai (/ˈmɔɪraɪ, -riː/)—often known in English as the Fates—were the personifications of destiny. In certain accounts, they were considered as three sisters: Clotho (the spinner), Lachesis (the allotter), and Atropos (the inevitable, a metaphor for death), though their number and names varied over time according to the author. Their Roman equivalents are the Parcae.

The role of the Moirai was to ensure that every being, mortal and divine, lived out their destiny as it was assigned to them by the laws of the universe. For mortals, this destiny spanned their entire lives and was represented as a thread spun from a spindle. Often, they were considered to be above even the other gods in their role as enforcers of fate.

The concept of a universal principle of natural order and balance has been compared to similar concepts in other cultures such as the Vedic Ṛta, the Avestan Asha (Arta), and the Egyptian Maat.

== Etymology ==
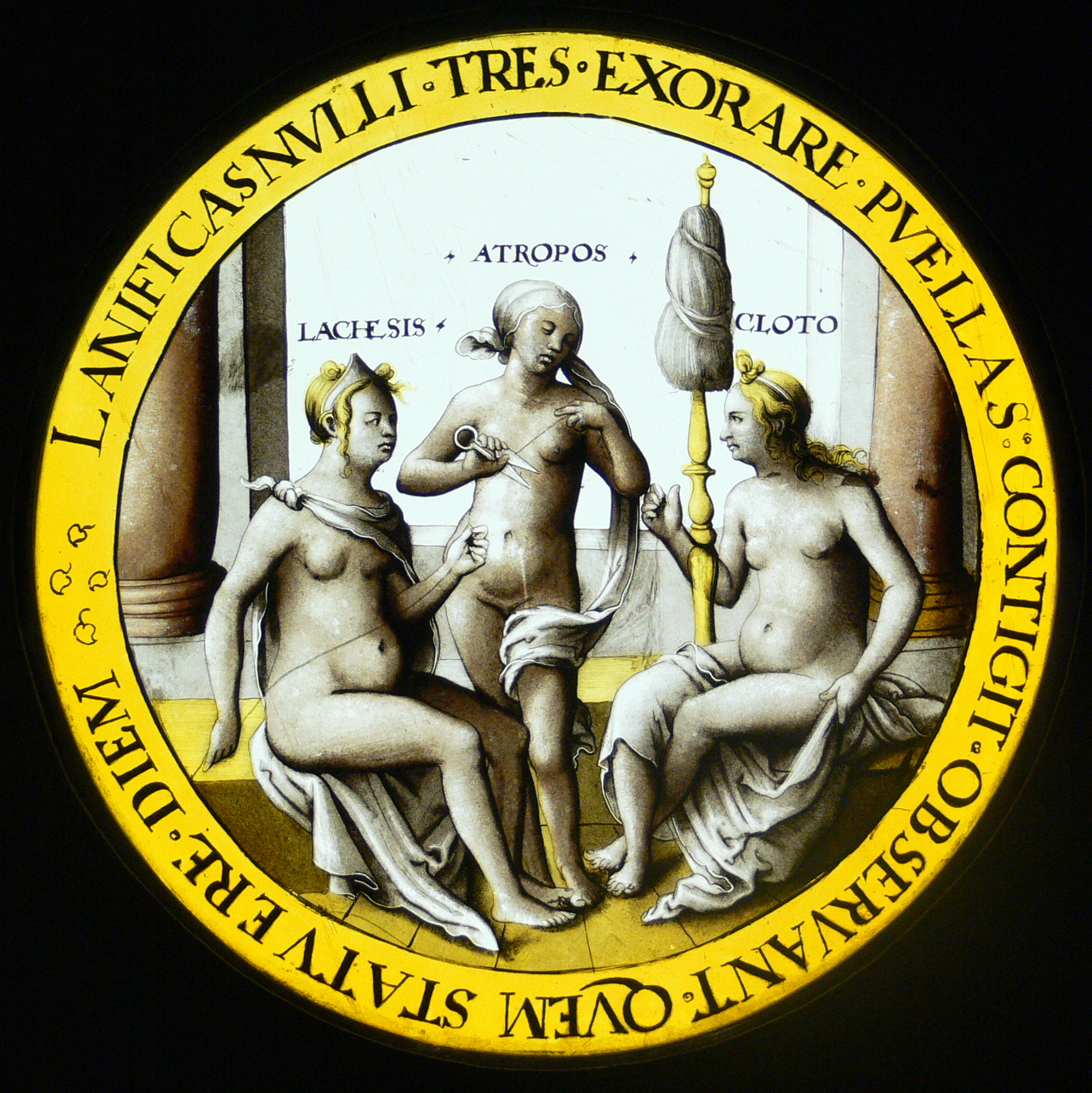
The Three Fates, tondo by Hans Vischer, c. 1530 (Kunstgewerbemuseum Berlin)

The word Moirai, also spelled Moirae or Mœræ, comes from Ancient Greek: μοῖρα, which means "lots, destinies, apportioners". It also means a portion or lot of the whole. It is related to meros, "part, lot" and moros, "fate, doom". The possible derived Latin meritum, "reward", English merit, maybe coming from the Proto-Indo-European language root *(s)mer, "to allot, assign".

In addition, Moira may mean

- portion or share in the distribution of booty (ίση μοῖρα, ísē moîra, "equal booty"),
- portion in life, lot, destiny, (μοῖραv ἔθηκαν ἀθάνατοι, moîran éthēken athánatoi, "the immortals fixed the destiny"),
- death (μοῖρα θανάτοιο, moîra thanátoio, "destiny of death"),
- portion of the distributed land.
- mete and right (κατὰ μοῖραν, kata moîran, "according to fate, in order, rightly").

== Cross-cultural parallels ==
=== European goddesses ===
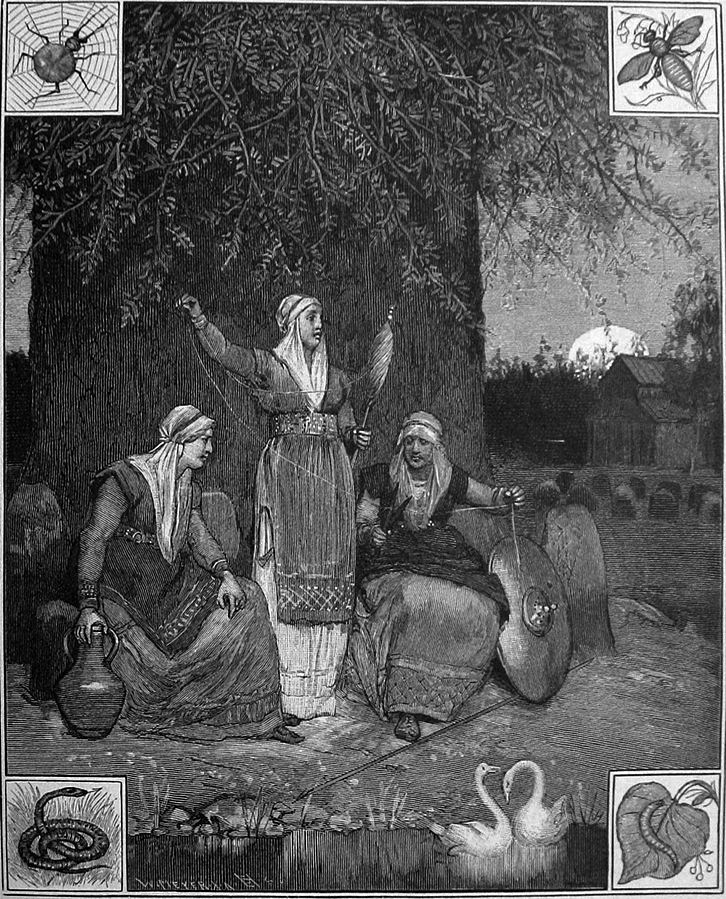
The Norns spin the threads of fate at the foot of Yggdrasil, the tree of the world.

The three Moirai are known in English as the Fates. This derives from Roman mythology, in which they are the Parcae or Fata, plural of Latin: fatum, meaning prophetic declaration, oracle, or destiny; euphemistically, the "sparing ones". There are other equivalents that descend from the Proto-Indo-European culture.

In Norse mythology the Norns are a trio of female beings who rule the destiny of gods and men, twining the thread of life. They set up the laws and decided on the lives of the children of men.

Their names were Urðr, related with Old English wyrd, modern weird ("fate, destiny, luck"), Verðandi, and Skuld, and it has often been concluded that they ruled over the past, present and future respectively, based on the sequence and partly the etymology of the names, of which the first two (literally 'Fate' and 'Becoming') are derived from the past and present stems of the verb verða, "to be", respectively, and the name of the third one means "debt" or "guilt", originally "that which must happen". In younger legendary sagas, the Norns appear to have been synonymous with witches (völvas), and they arrive at the birth of the hero to shape his destiny.

Many other cultures included trios of goddesses associated with fate or destiny. The Celtic Matres and Matrones, female deities almost always depicted in groups of three, have been proposed as connected to the Norns.

In Lithuanian and other Baltic mythologies, the goddess Laima is the personification of destiny, and her most important duty was to prophesy how the life of a newborn will take place. With her sisters Kārta and Dēkla, she is part of a trinity of fate deities similar to the Moirai. In Hurrian mythology the three goddesses of fate, the Hutena, were believed to dispense good and evil, life and death to humans.

=== Later European culture ===
In Dante's Divine Comedy, the Fates are mentioned in both Inferno (XXXIII.126) and Purgatorio (XXI.25–27, XXV.79–81) by their Greek names, and their traditional role in measuring out and determining the length of human life is assumed by the narrator.

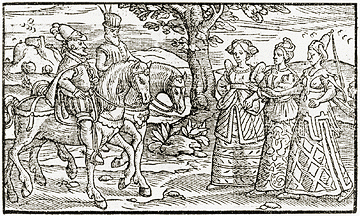
Macbeth and Banquo meeting the three weird sisters in a woodcut from Holinshed's Chronicles.

In Shakespeare's Macbeth, the Weird Sisters (or Three Witches) are prophetesses who are deeply rooted in both the real and supernatural worlds. Their creation was influenced by British folklore, witchcraft, and the legends of the Norns and the Moirai. Hecate, the chthonic Greek goddess associated with magic, witchcraft, necromancy, and three-way crossroads, appears as the master of the Three Witches. In ancient Greek religion, Hecate as goddess of childbirth is identified with Artemis, who was the leader (ηγεμόνη: hegemone ) of the nymphs.

=== Outside Europe ===
A section of the Egyptian Book of the Dead showing the "Weighing of the Heart" in the Duat using the feather of Maat as the measure in balance.

The notion of a universal principle of natural order has been compared to similar ideas in other cultures, such as aša (Asha) in Avestan religion, Rta in Vedic religion, and Maat in ancient Egyptian religion.

In the Avestan religion and Zoroastrianism, aša, is commonly summarized in accord with its contextual implications of "truth", "righteousness", "order". Aša and its Vedic equivalent, Rta, are both derived from a PIE root meaning "properly joined, right, true". The word is the proper name of the divinity Asha, the personification of "Truth" and "Righteousness". Aša corresponds to an objective, material reality which embraces all of existence. This cosmic force is imbued also with morality, as verbal Truth, and Righteousness, action conforming with the moral order.

In the literature of the Mandaeans, an angelic being (Abatur) has the responsibility of weighing the souls of the deceased to determine their worthiness, using a set of scales.

In the Vedic religion, Rta is an ontological principle of natural order which regulates and coordinates the operation of the universe. The term is now interpreted abstractly as "cosmic order", or simply as "truth", although it was never abstract at the time.

It seems that this idea originally arose in the Indo-Aryan period, from a consideration (so denoted to indicate the original meaning of communing with the star beings) of the qualities of nature which either remain constant or which occur on a regular basis.

The individuals fulfill their true natures when they follow the path set for them by the ordinances of Rta, acting according to the Dharma, which is related to social and moral spheres. The god of the waters Varuna was probably originally conceived as the personalized aspect of the otherwise impersonal Ṛta. The gods are never portrayed as having command over Ṛta, but instead they remain subject to it like all created beings.

In Egyptian religion, maat was the ancient Egyptian concept of truth, balance, order, law, morality, and justice. The word is the proper name of the divinity Maat, who was the goddess of harmony, justice, and truth represented as a young woman.

It was considered that she set the order of the universe from chaos at the moment of creation. Maat was the norm and basic values that formed the backdrop for the application of justice that had to be carried out in the spirit of truth and fairness.

In Egyptian mythology, Maat dealt with the weighing of souls that took place in the underworld. Her feather was the measure that determined whether the souls (considered to reside in the heart) of the departed would reach the paradise of afterlife successfully. In the famous scene of the Egyptian Book of the Dead, Anubis, using a scale, weighs the sins of a man's heart against the feather of truth, which represents maat. If man's heart weighs down, then he is devoured by a monster.

== The three Moirai ==
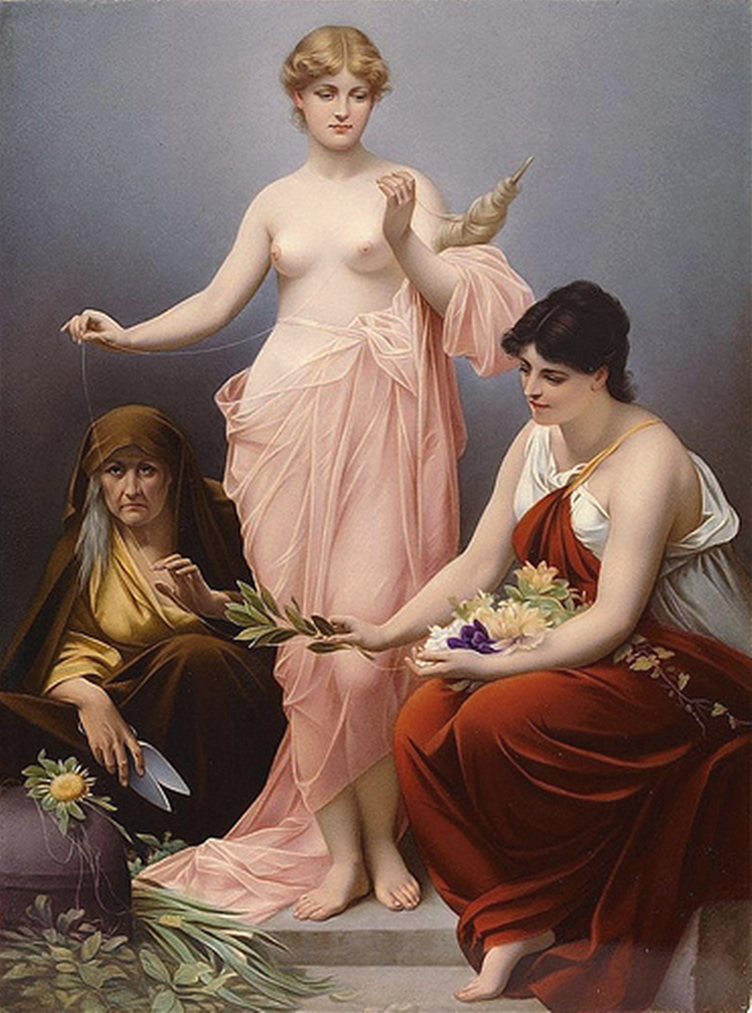
The Three Fates by Paul Thumann, 19th century

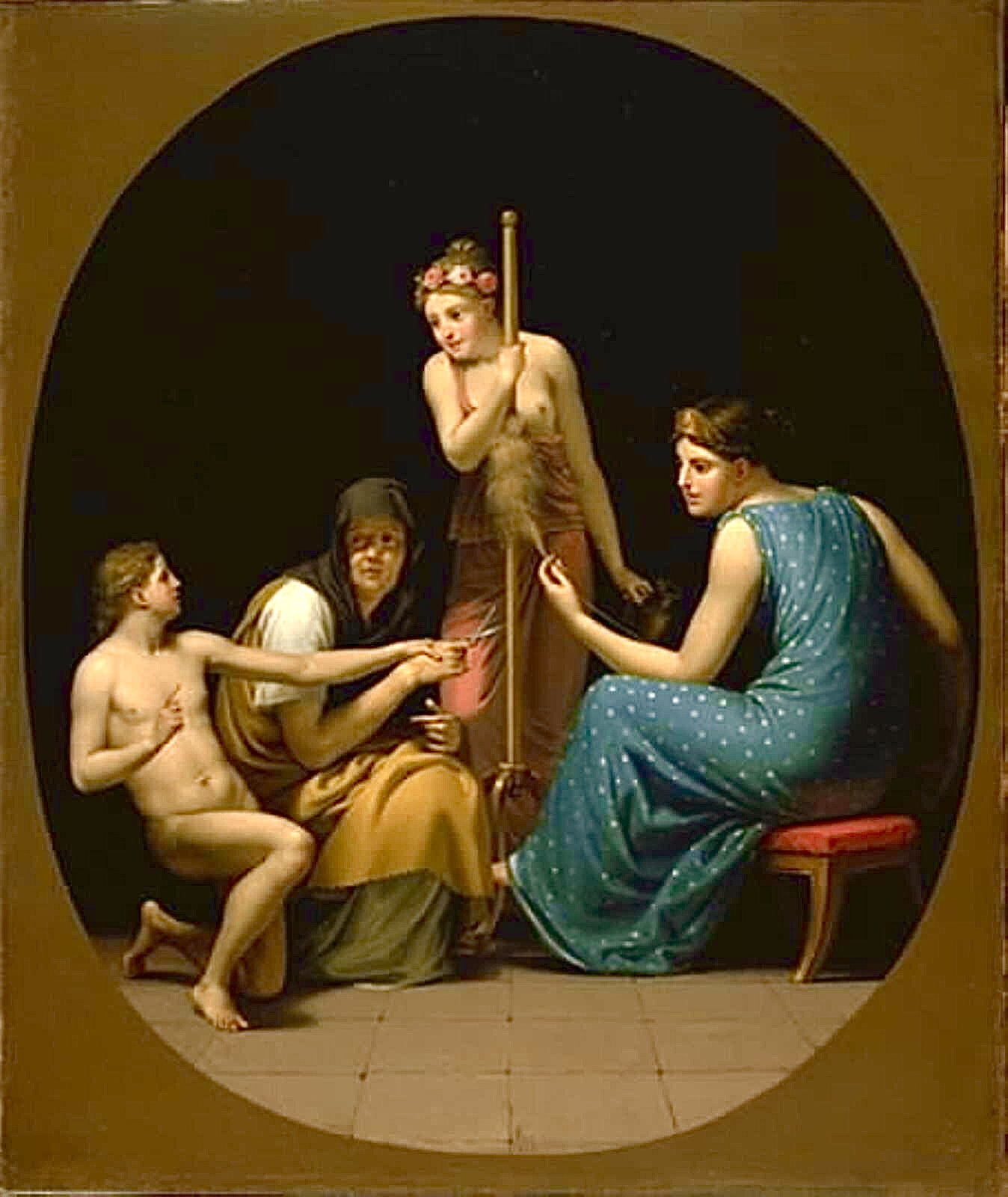
The three Parcae, Clotho, Lachesis and Atropos spinning the thread of life 1808, by Christoffer Wilhelm Eckersberg

When they were three, the Moirai were:

- Clotho (/ˈkloʊθoʊ/, Greek Κλωθώ, [klɔːtʰɔ̌ː], "spinner") spun the thread of life from her distaff onto her spindle. Her Roman equivalent was Nona ("the ninth"), who was originally a goddess called upon in the ninth month of pregnancy.
- Lachesis (/ˈlækɪsɪs/, Greek Λάχεσις, [lákʰesis], "allotter" or drawer of lots) measured the thread of life allotted to each person with her measuring rod. Her Roman equivalent was Decima ("the tenth").
- Atropos (/ˈætrəpɒs/, Greek Ἄτροπος, [átropos], "inexorable" or "inevitable", literally "unturning") was the cutter of the thread of life. She chose the manner of each person's death; and when their time has come, she cut their life-thread with her "abhorred shears". Her Roman equivalent was Morta ("the dead one").

In the Republic of Plato, the three Moirai sing in unison with the music of the Seirenes. Lachesis sings the things that were, Clotho the things that are, and Atropos the things that are to be. Pindar in his Hymn to the Fates, holds them in high honour. He calls them to send their sisters, the Hours: Eunomia ("lawfulness"), Dike ("right"), and Eirene ("peace"), to stop the internal civil strife.

== Origins ==
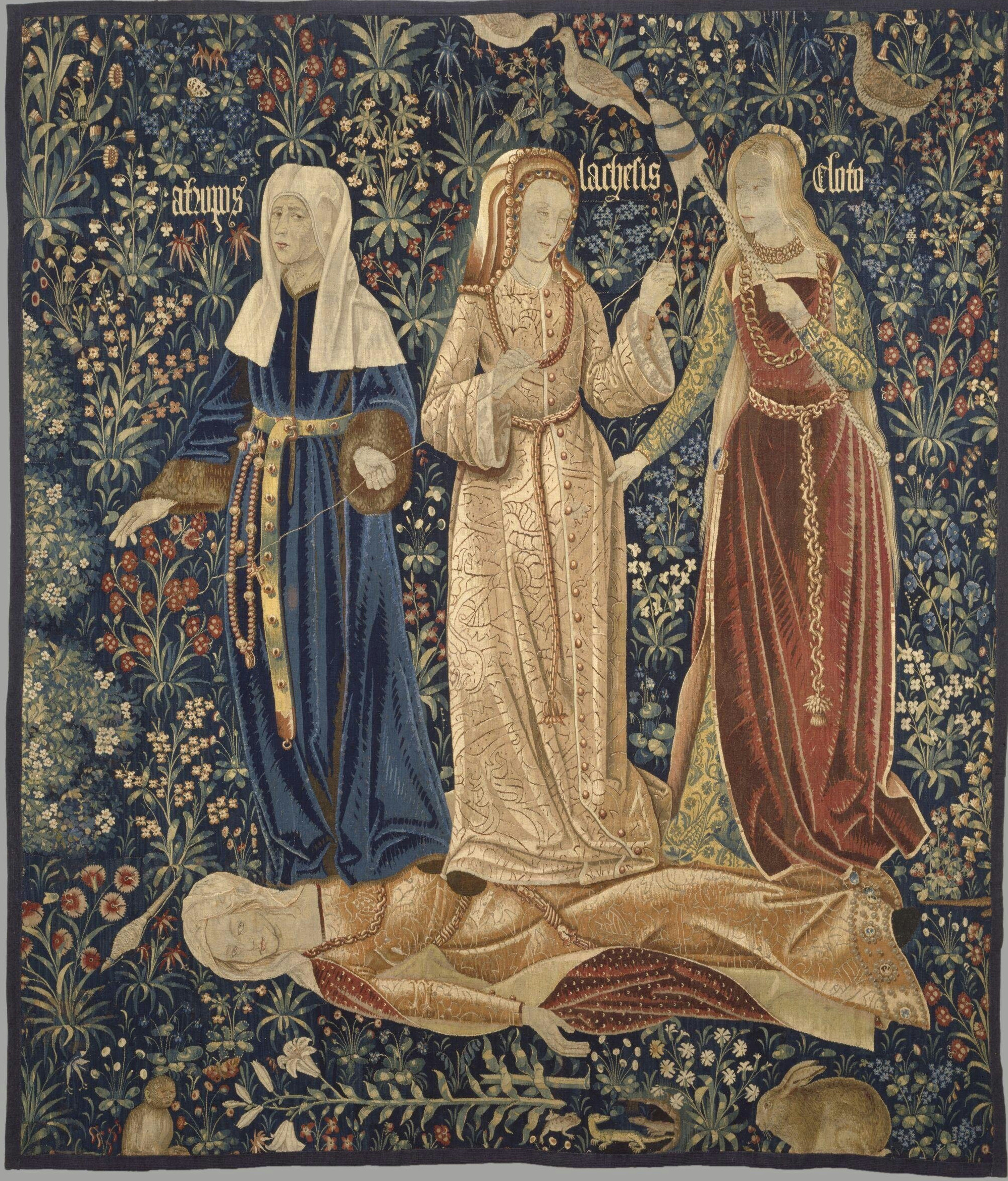
The three Moirai, or the Triumph of death, Flemish tapestry, c. 1520 (Victoria and Albert Museum, London)

The figure who came to be known as Atropos had her origins in the pre-Greek Mycenaean religion as a daemon or spirit called Aisa. Much of the Mycenaean religion survived into classical Greece, but it is not known to what extent classical religious belief is Mycenaean, nor how much is a product of the Greek Dark Ages or later. Moses I. Finley detected only few authentic Mycenaean beliefs in the 8th-century Homeric world. One such belief was the attribution of unexpected events to spirits or daemons, who appeared in special occurrences. Martin P. Nilsson associated these daemons to a hypothetical Pre-Greek religion.

Another important Mycenaean philosophy stressed the subjugation of all events or actions to destiny and the acceptance of the inevitability of the natural order of things; today this is known as fatalism.

The concept of moira referred to one's fair allotment or portion, originally one's portion of loot from battle, which was distributed according to strict traditions. The idea eventually began to be applied to one's fair allotment in life. Obtaining more than one's fair portion (ὑπὲρ μοῖραν "over the portion") of loot, or of life in general was possible, but would result in severe consequences because this was considered a violation in the natural order of things. For example, in a passage in the Iliad, Apollo tries three times to stop Patroclus from sacking Troy, warning him that it would be "over his portion".

In particular, the most important parts of the natural order were birth and death. Eventually, the concept of one's destined portion in life began to be personified as a spirit or daemon, referred to as Aisa or Moira, who would determine the appropriate time for one's death at the moment of their birth. In this sense, Moira is a power that governs even the gods.

In another passage of the Iliad, Zeus knows that his cherished son Sarpedon will be killed by Patroclus, but Zeus cannot prevent his fate. In a later scene known as the kerostasia, Zeus appears as the arbiter of destiny, using a pair of scales to weigh Hector's destiny and determining that he is fated to die.

The elevation of Moira to a goddess who determines the course of events appears in the newer parts of the epos. In the Odyssey, she is accompanied by the "Spinners", the personifications of Fate, who do not yet have separate names.

In his writing, the poet Hesiod introduces a moral purpose to the Moirai which is absent in the Homeric poems. In his conception, the Moirai punish not only men but also gods for their sins.

== Mythical relationships ==
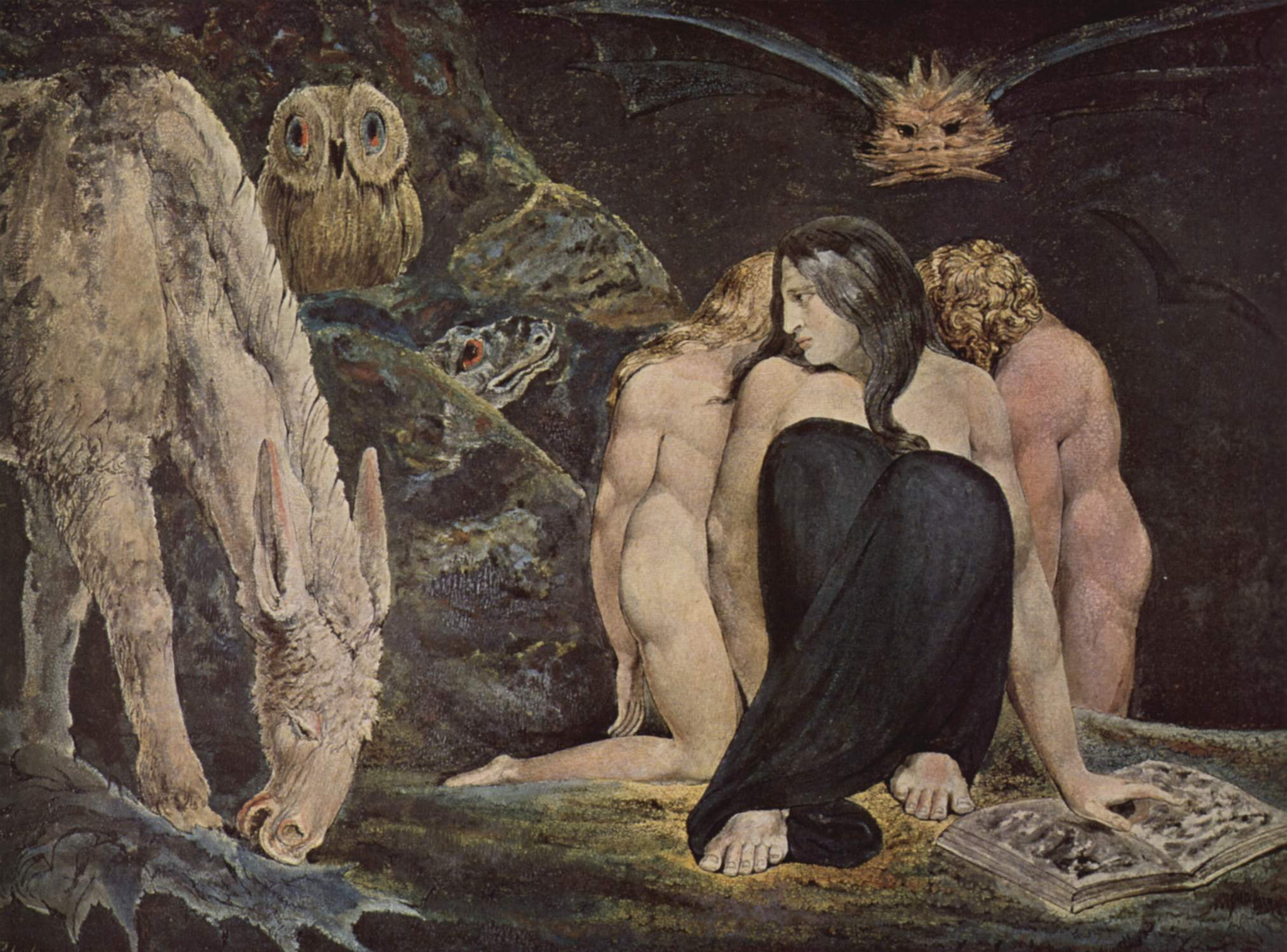
The Night of Enitharmon's Joy, showing Hekate and the Moirai, by William Blake, 1795 (Tate Gallery, London)

In the Theogony, Hesiod describes the Moirai as daughters of the primeval goddess Nyx ("night"), and sisters of the Keres ("the black fates"), Thanatos ("death"), and Nemesis ("retribution"). Later in the poem, Hesiod instead calls them daughters of Zeus and the Titaness Themis ("the Institutor"), who was the embodiment of divine order and law, placing them as sisters of Eunomia ("lawfulness, order"), Dike ("justice"), and Eirene ("peace").

In the cosmogony of Alcman (7th century BC), first came Thetis ("disposer, creation"), and then simultaneously Poros ("path") and Tekmor ("end post, ordinance"). Poros is related with the beginning of all things, and Tekmor is related with the end of all things.

Later in the Orphic cosmogony, first came Thesis, whose ineffable nature is unexpressed. Ananke ("necessity") is the primeval goddess of inevitability who is entwined with the time-god Chronos, at the very beginning of time. They represented the cosmic forces of Fate and Time, and they were called sometimes to control the fates of the gods. The three Moirai are daughters of Ananke.

== Mythology ==
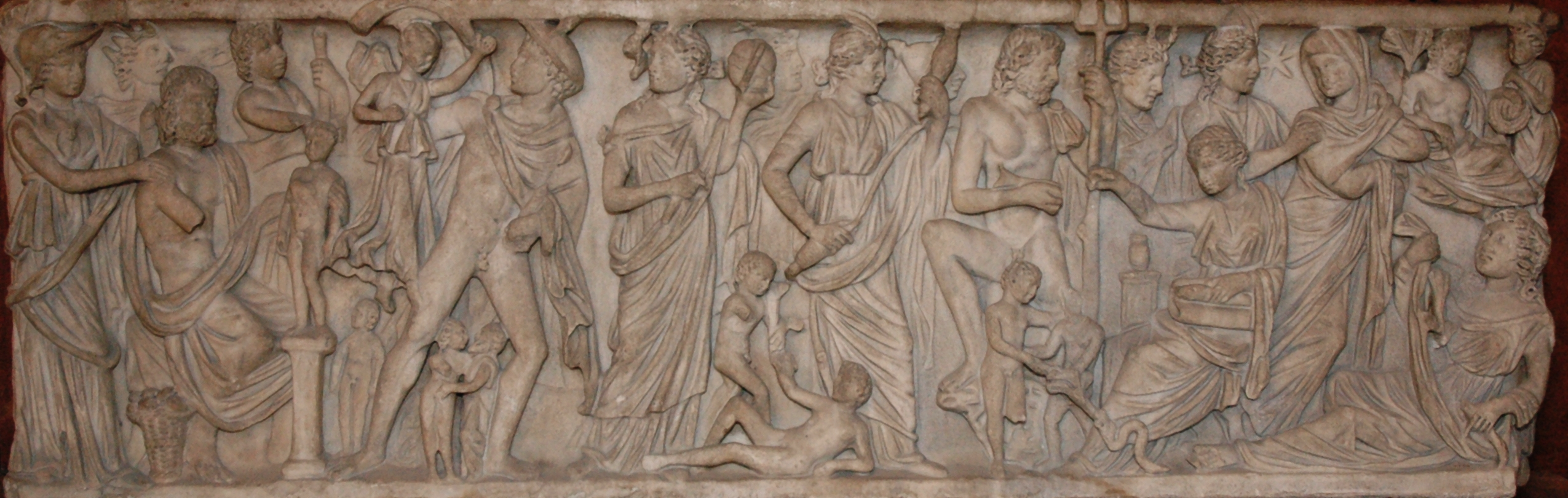
Prometheus creates man: Clotho and Lachesis besides Poseidon (with his trident), and presumably Atropos besides Artemis (with the moon crescent) are seen, Roman sarcophagus (Louvre).

The Moirai were three sisters: Clotho (the spinner), Lachesis (the allotter), and Atropos (the inevitable, a metaphor for death). But according to a Latin verse, their roles and functions were somewhat different: "Clotho, the youngest of the sisters, presided over the moment in which we are born, and held a distaff in her hand; Lachesis spun out all the events and actions of our life; and Atropos, the eldest of the three, cut the thread of human life with a pair of scissors."

In the Homeric poems Moira or Aisa are related to the limit and end of life, and Zeus appears as the guider of destiny. In the Theogony of Hesiod, the three Moirai are personified, daughters of Nyx and are acting over the gods. Later they are daughters of Zeus and Themis, who was the embodiment of divine order and law. In Plato's Republic the Three Fates are daughters of Ananke (necessity).

The Moirai were supposed to appear three nights after a child's birth to determine the course of its life, as in the story of Meleager and the firebrand taken from the hearth and preserved by his mother to extend his life. Bruce Karl Braswell from readings in the lexicon of Hesychius, associates the appearance of the Moirai at the family hearth on the seventh day with the ancient Greek custom of waiting seven days after birth to decide whether to accept the infant into the Gens and to give it a name, cemented with a ritual at the hearth. At Sparta the temple to the Moirai stood near the communal hearth of the polis, as Pausanias observed.

As goddesses of birth who even prophesied the fate of the newly born, Eileithyia, the goddess of childbirth and divine midwifery, was their companion. Pausanias mentions an ancient role of Eileythia as "the clever spinner", relating her with destiny too. Their appearance indicate the Greek desire for health which was connected with the Greek cult of the body that was essentially a religious activity.

The Erinyes, a group of chthonic goddesses of vengeance, served as tools of the Moirai, inflicting punishment for evil deeds, particularly upon those who sought to avoid their rightful destiny. At times, the Moirai were conflated with the Erinyes, as well as the death-goddesses the Keres.

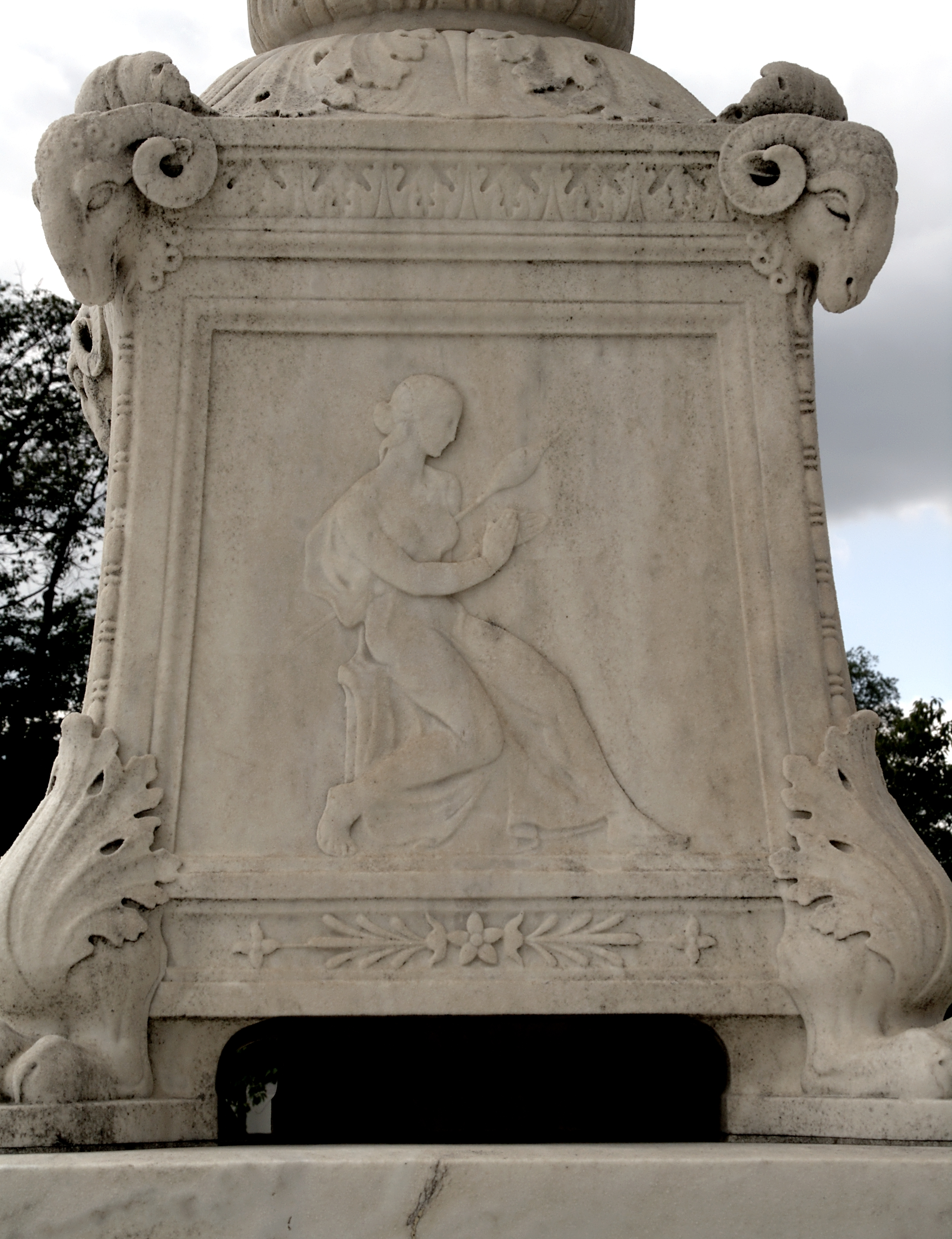
Bas relief of Clotho, lampstand at the Supreme Court of the United States, Washington, D.C.

In earlier times they were represented as only a few—perhaps only one—individual goddess. Homer's Iliad (xxiv.209) speaks generally of the Moira, who spins the thread of life for men at their birth; she is Moira Krataia "powerful Moira" (xvi.334) or there are several Moirai (xxiv.49). In the Odyssey (vii.197) there is a reference to the Klôthes, or Spinners. At Delphi, only the Fates of Birth and Death were revered. In Athens, Aphrodite, who had an earlier, pre-Olympic existence, was called Aphrodite Urania the "eldest of the Fates" according to Pausanias (x.24.4).

Some Greek mythographers went so far as to claim that the Moirai were the daughters of Zeus—paired with Themis ("fundament"), as Hesiod had it in one passage. In the older myths they are daughters of primeval beings like Nyx ("night") in Theogony, or Ananke in Orphic cosmogony. Whether or not providing a father even for the Moirai was a symptom of how far Greek mythographers were willing to go, in order to modify the old myths to suit the patrilineal Olympic order, the claim of a paternity was certainly not acceptable to Aeschylus, Herodotus, or Plato.

Despite their forbidding reputation, the Moirai could be placated as goddesses. Brides in Athens offered them locks of hair, and women swore by them. They may have originated as birth goddesses and only later acquired their reputation as the agents of destiny.

According to the mythographer Apollodorus, in the Gigantomachy, the war between the Giants and Olympians, the Moirai killed the Giants Agrios and Thoon with their bronze clubs.

The Moirai were also credited to be inventors of seven Greek letters—A B H T I Y.

== Zeus and the Moirai ==
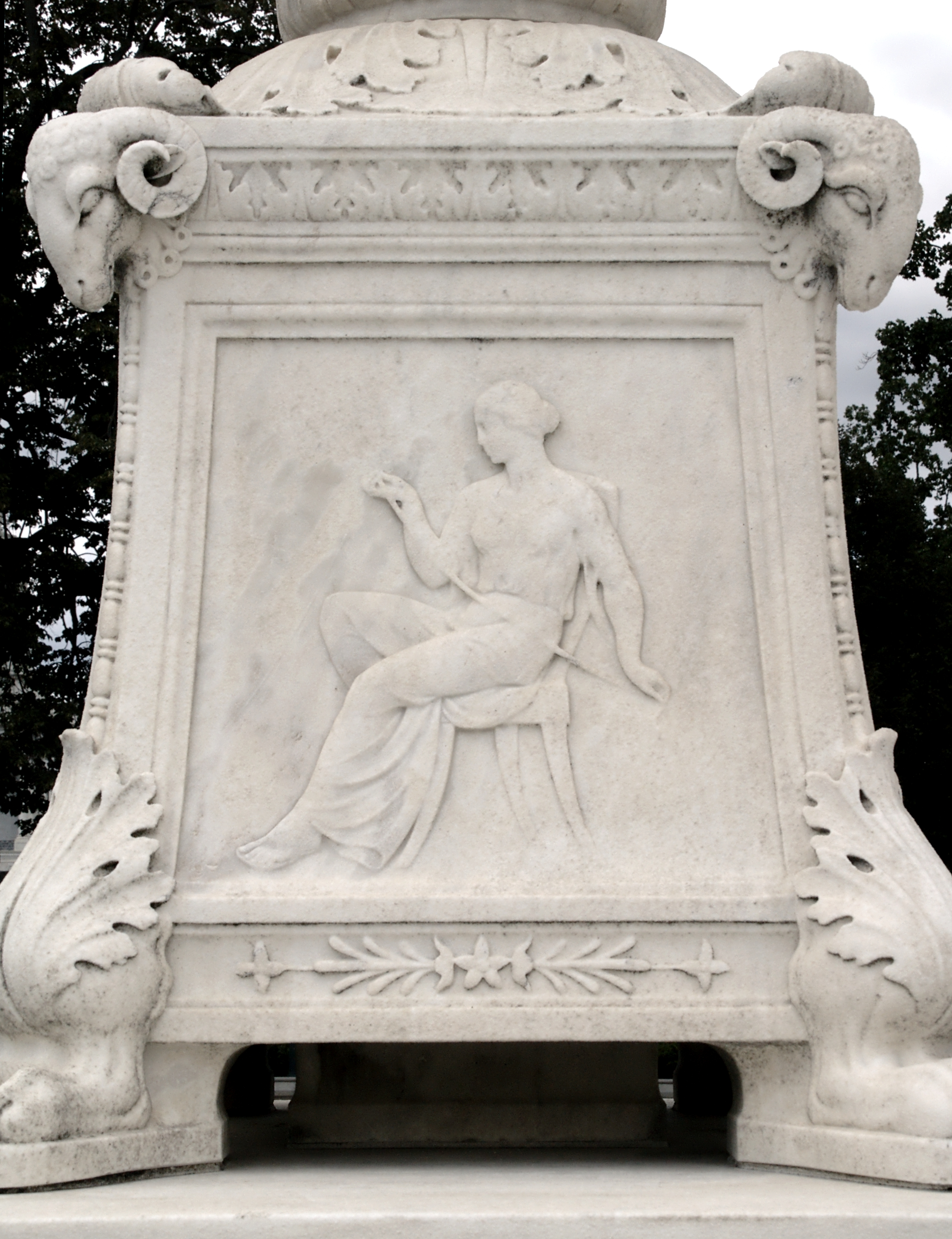
Bas relief of Lachesis, lampstand at the Supreme Court, Washington, D.C.

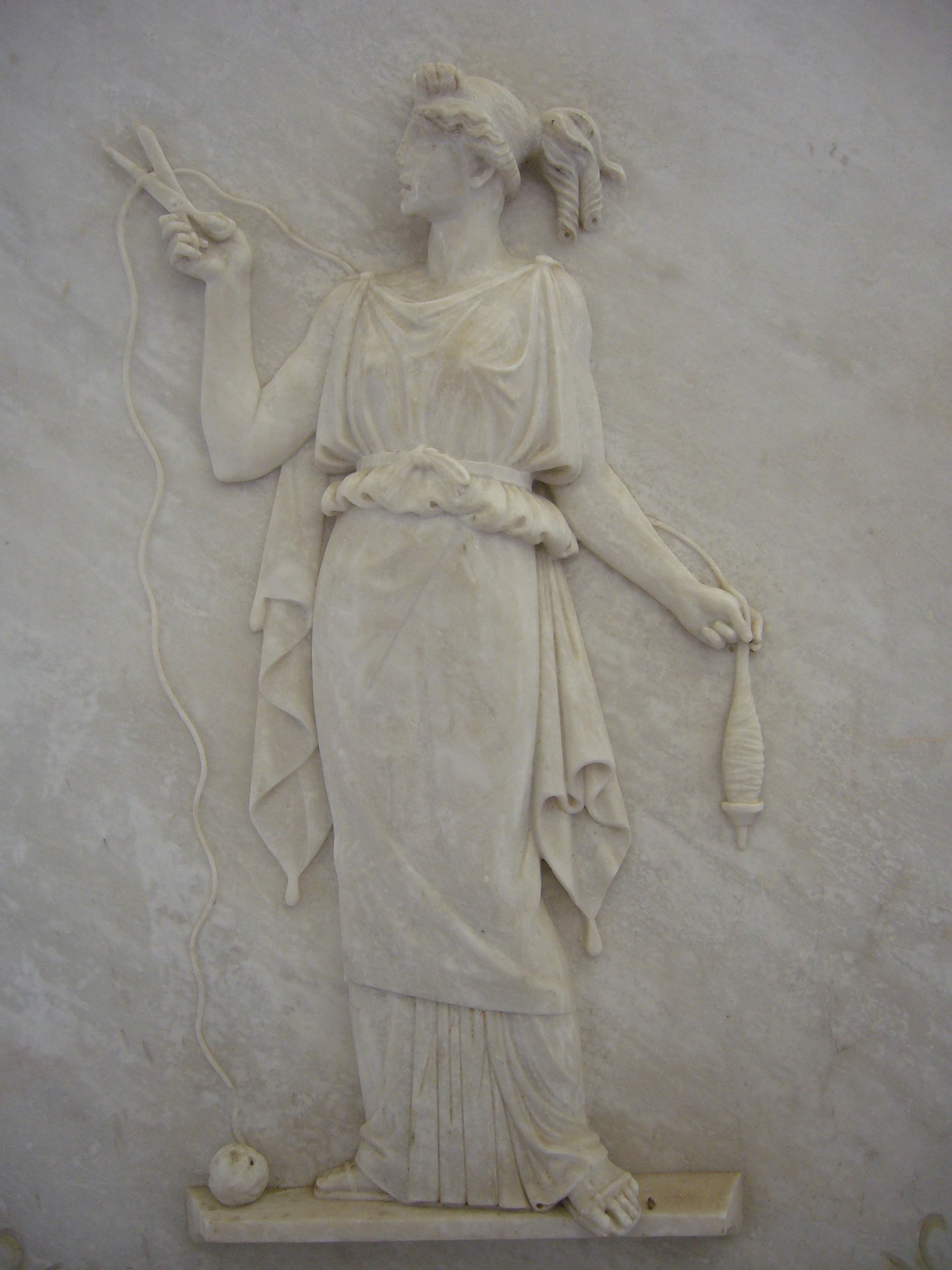
Bas relief of Atropos cutting the thread of life

In the Homeric poems Moira is represented as a singular entity whose actions are not governed by the gods. Only Zeus, the chief of the gods, is close to her, and in some cases acts in a similar role. Using a weighing scale Zeus weighs Hector's "lot of death" against that of Achilleus. Hector's lot weighs down, and he dies according to Fate. Zeus appears as the guider of destiny, who gives everyone the right portion. A similar scenario is depicted on a Mycenaean vase, where Zeus holds a scale in front of two warriors, indicating that he is measuring their destiny before the battle. The belief was that if they die in battle, this was to be accepted as their correct destiny.

In Theogony, the three Moirai are daughters of the primeval goddess, Nyx ("Night"), representing a power acting over the gods. Later they are daughters of Zeus who gives them the greatest honour, and Themis, the ancient goddess of law and divine order.

Even the gods feared the Moirai or Fates, which according to Herodotus a god could not escape. The Pythian priestess at Delphi once admitted that Zeus was also subject to their power, though no recorded classical writing clarifies to what exact extent the lives of immortals were affected by the whims of the Fates. It is to be expected that the relationship of Zeus and the Moirai was not immutable over the centuries. In either case in antiquity we can see a feeling towards a notion of an order to which even the gods have to conform. Simonides names this power Ananke (necessity) (the mother of the Moirai in Orphic cosmogony) and says that even the gods don't fight against it. Aeschylus combines Fate and necessity in a scheme, and claims that even Zeus cannot alter which is ordained.

A supposed epithet Zeus Moiragetes, meaning "Zeus Leader of the Moirai" was inferred by Pausanias from an inscription he saw in the 2nd century AD at Olympia: "As you go to the starting-point for the chariot-race there is an altar with an inscription to the Bringer of Fate. This is plainly a surname of Zeus, who knows the affairs of men, all that the Fates give them, and all that is not destined for them." At the Temple of Zeus at Megara, Pausanias inferred from the relief sculptures he saw "Above the head of Zeus are the Horai and Moirai, and all may see that he is the only god obeyed by Moira." Pausanias' inferred assertion is unsupported in cult practice, though he noted a sanctuary of the Moirai there at Olympia (5.15.4), and also at Corinth (2.4.7) and Sparta (3.11.8), and adjoining the sanctuary of Themis outside a city gate of Thebes.

== Cult and temples ==
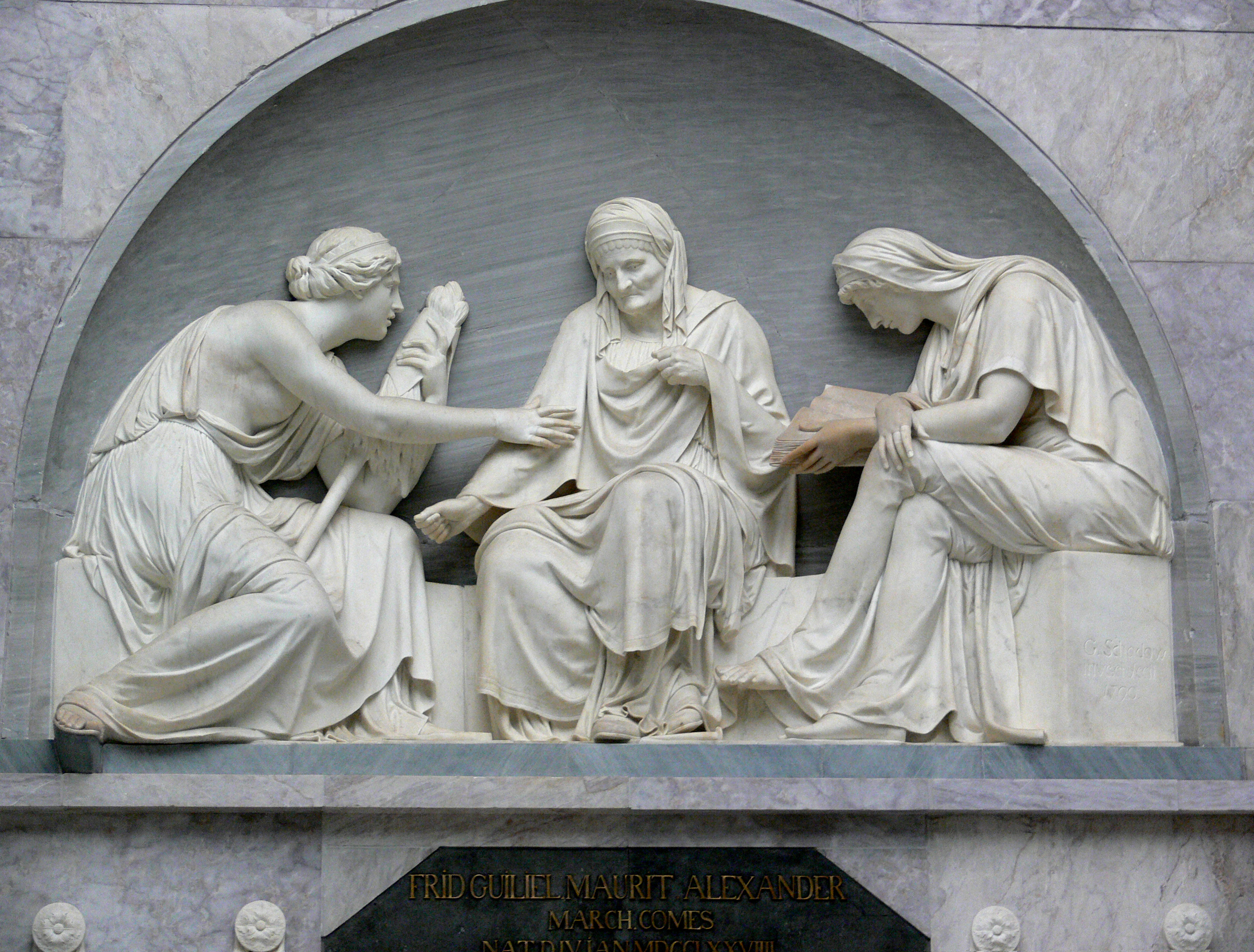
The three Moirai, relief, grave of Alexander von der Mark by Johann Gottfried Schadow (Old National Gallery, Berlin)

The fates had at least three known temples, in Ancient Corinth, Sparta and Thebes. At least the temple of Corinth contained statues of them:

"[On the Akropolis (Acropolis) of Korinthos (Corinth):] The temple of the Moirai (Moirae, Fates) and that of Demeter and Kore (Core) [Persephone] have images that are not exposed to view."

The temple in Thebes was explicitly imageless:

"Along the road from the Neistan gate [at Thebes in Boiotia (Boeotia)] are three sanctuaries. There is a sanctuary of Themis, with an image of white marble; adjoining it is a sanctuary of the Moirai (Moirae, Fates), while the third is of Agoraios (Agoreus, of the Market) Zeus. Zeus is made of stone; the Moirai (Moirae, Fates) have no images."

The temple in Sparta was situated next to the grave of Orestes.

Aside from actual temples, there was also altars to the Moirai. Among them was notably the altar in Olympia near the altar of Zeus Moiragetes, a connection to Zeus which was also repeated in the images of the Moirai in the temple of Despoine in Arkadia as well as in Delphi, where they were depicted with Zeus Moiragetes (Guide of Fate) as well as with Apollon Moiragetes (Guide of Fate). On Korkyra, the shrine of Apollo, which according to legend was founded by Medea was also a place where offerings were made to the Moirai and the nymphs. The worship of the Moirai are described by Pausanias for their altar near Sicyon:

"On the direct road from Sikyon (Sicyon) to Phlios (Phlius) ... At a distance along it, in my opinion, of twenty stades, to the left on the other side of the Asopos [river], is a grove of holm oaks and a temple of the goddesses named by the Athenians the Semnai (August), and by the Sikyonians the Eumenides (Kindly Ones). On one day in each year they celebrate a festival to them and offer sheep big with young as a burnt offering, and they are accustomed to use a libation of honey and water, and flowers instead of garlands. They practise similar rites at the altar of the Moirai (Moirae, Fates); it is in an open space in the grove."

== Astronomical objects ==
The asteroids (97) Klotho, (120) Lachesis, and (273) Atropos are named for the Three Fates.

== See also ==
- Ananke
- Asha
- Deities and fairies of fate in Slavic mythology
- Fates
- Istustaya and Papaya
- Kallone
- Enchanted Moura
- Laima
- Matrones
- Norns
- Parcae
- Rta
- Trimurti/Tridevi

== Bibliography ==
- Armour, Robert A, 2001, Gods and Myths of Ancient Egypt, American Univ. in Cairo Press, ISBN 977-424-669-1.
- Brill's New Pauly: Encyclopaedia of the Ancient World. Antiquity, Volume 10, Obl-Phe, editors: Hubert Cancik, Helmuth Schneider, Brill, 2007. ISBN 978-90-04-14215-2. Online version at Brill.
- Homer. The Iliad with an English translation. A. T. Murray, Ph.D. (1924), in two volumes. Cambridge, MA, Harvard University Press; London, William Heinemann Ltd.
- Homer. The Odyssey with an English translation. A. T. Murray, Ph.D. (1919), in two volumes. Cambridge, MA, Harvard University Press; London, William Heinemann Ltd.
- Thomas Blisniewski, 1992. Kinder der dunkelen Nacht: Die Ikonographie der Parzen vom späten Mittelalter bis zum späten 18. Jahrhundert. (Cologne) Iconography of the Fates from the late Middle Ages to the end of the 18th century.
- Markos Giannoulis, 2010. Die Moiren. Tradition und Wandel des Motivs der Schicksalsgöttinnen in der antiken und byzantinischen Kunst, Ergänzungsband zu Jahrbuch für Antike und Christentum, Kleine Reihe 6 (F. J. Dölger Institut). Aschendorff Verlag, Münster, ISBN 978-3-402-10913-7.
- Robert Graves, Greek Myths.
- Jane Ellen Harrison, Prolegomena to the Study of Greek Religion 1903. Chapter VI, "The Maiden-Trinities".
- L. H. Jeffery, 1976. Archaic Greece. The City-States c. 700–500 BC . Ernest Benn Ltd. London & Tonbridge, ISBN 0-510-03271-0.
- Karl Kerenyi, 1951. The Gods of the Greeks (Thames and Hudson).
- Martin P. Nilsson,1967. Die Geschichte der Griechischen Religion. Vol I, C.F. Beck Verlag., München.
- Bertrand Russell, 1946. A history of Western Philosophy, and its connections with Political and Social Circumstances from the earliest times to the Present Day. New York. Simon & Schuster p. 148
- Harry Thurston Peck, Harper's Dictionary of Classical Antiquities, 1898. perseus.tufts.edu
- Herbert Jennings Rose, Handbook of Greek Mythology, 1928.
- Carl Ruck and Danny Staples, The World of Classical Myth, 1994.
- William Smith, Dictionary of Greek and Roman Biography and Mythology, 1870, article on Moira, ancientlibrary.com
- R. G. Wunderlich (1994). The secret of Crete. Efstathiadis group, Athens pp. 290–291, 295–296. (British Edition, Souvenir Press Ltd. London 1975) ISBN 960-226-261-3
