= Anne-Katrin Altwein =

German sculptor and painter

Anne-Katrin Altwein (born Anne-Katrin Leunig 2 January 1960 in Hohenstein-Ernstthal – 15 January 2023) was a German sculptor, graphic artist and author.

== Life ==
In 1984, Altwein completed her studies at Burg Giebichenstein University of Art and Design. In 2001, she accepted a teaching position at the University of Music Franz Liszt Weimar.

She is successful both nationally and internationally and has won numerous awards. Her sculptures are also visible in public collections. Her marble goddess statues, named the "Three Moirs", were featured outside of the hospital in Lobeda. Due to the expansion of the clinic, the statues were moved in 2012 to a park in Jena.

Altwein signed the anti-immigration 2018 Joint Declaration .

== Exhibitions ==
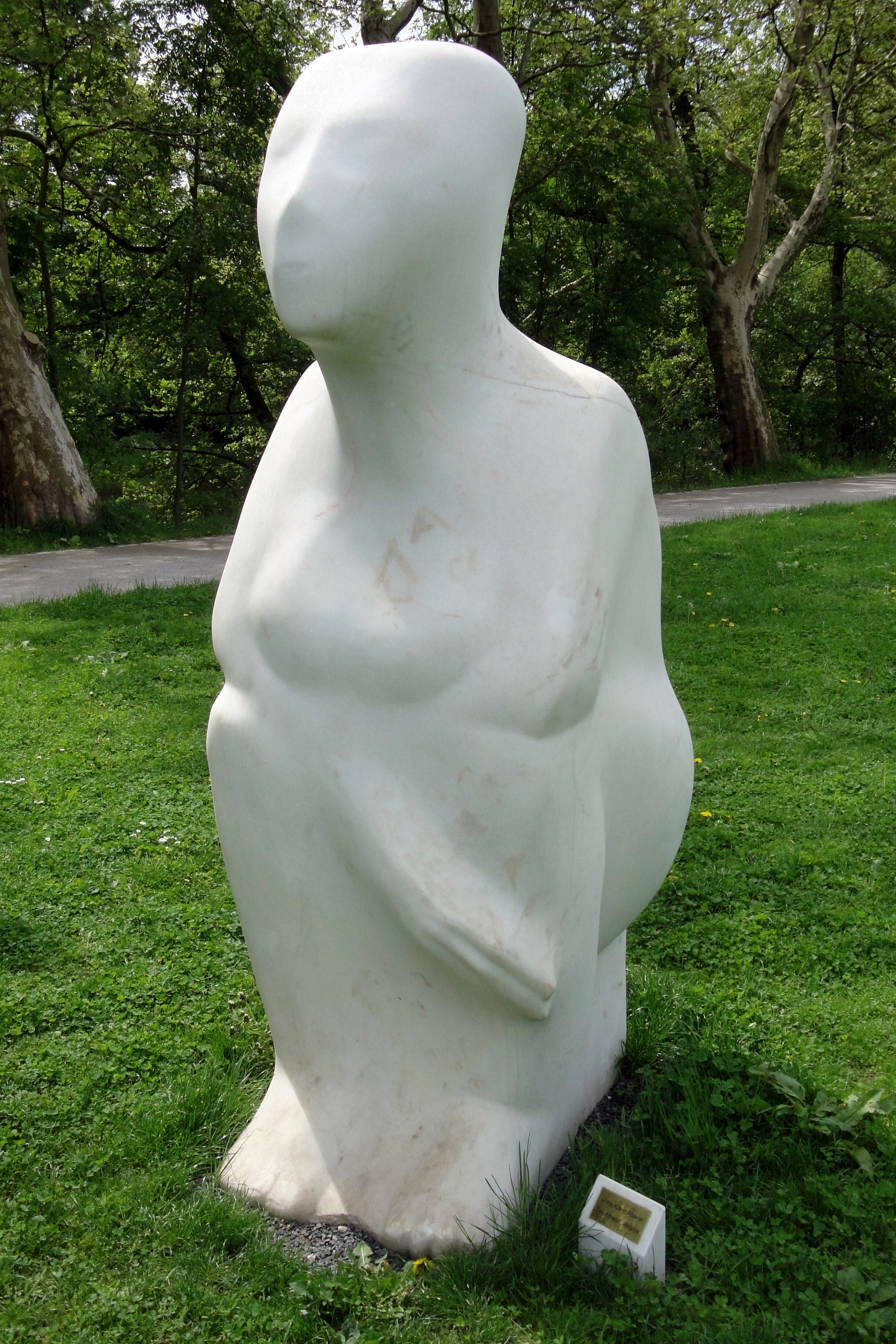
Drei Moiren - Atropos

- 1996: UN Palace in Geneva, Switzerland
- 1996: Center Culturel Amiens (France)
- 1998: Kunsthalle Weimar and TUFA Trier (Germany)
- 2009: eu-art network exhibition Palazzo Albrizzi on the occasion of the Venice Biennale (Italy)
- 2009: Thuringian state parliament
- 2010: Sculptures in the city of Weimar (Germany)
- 2011: Bayreuth Art Cabinet (Germany)
- 2011: Sculpture Park (Sweden)
- 2012: UddenSculpture (Sweden)
- 2012: InSitu in Vodnjan / Dignano (Croatia)
- 2021: Niemiecka Wystawa Interdyszyplinarna Baltycka Gallery Sztuki Amphitheater, Koszalin (Poland)
- 2023 Lübbenau
