= Toute la Lyre =

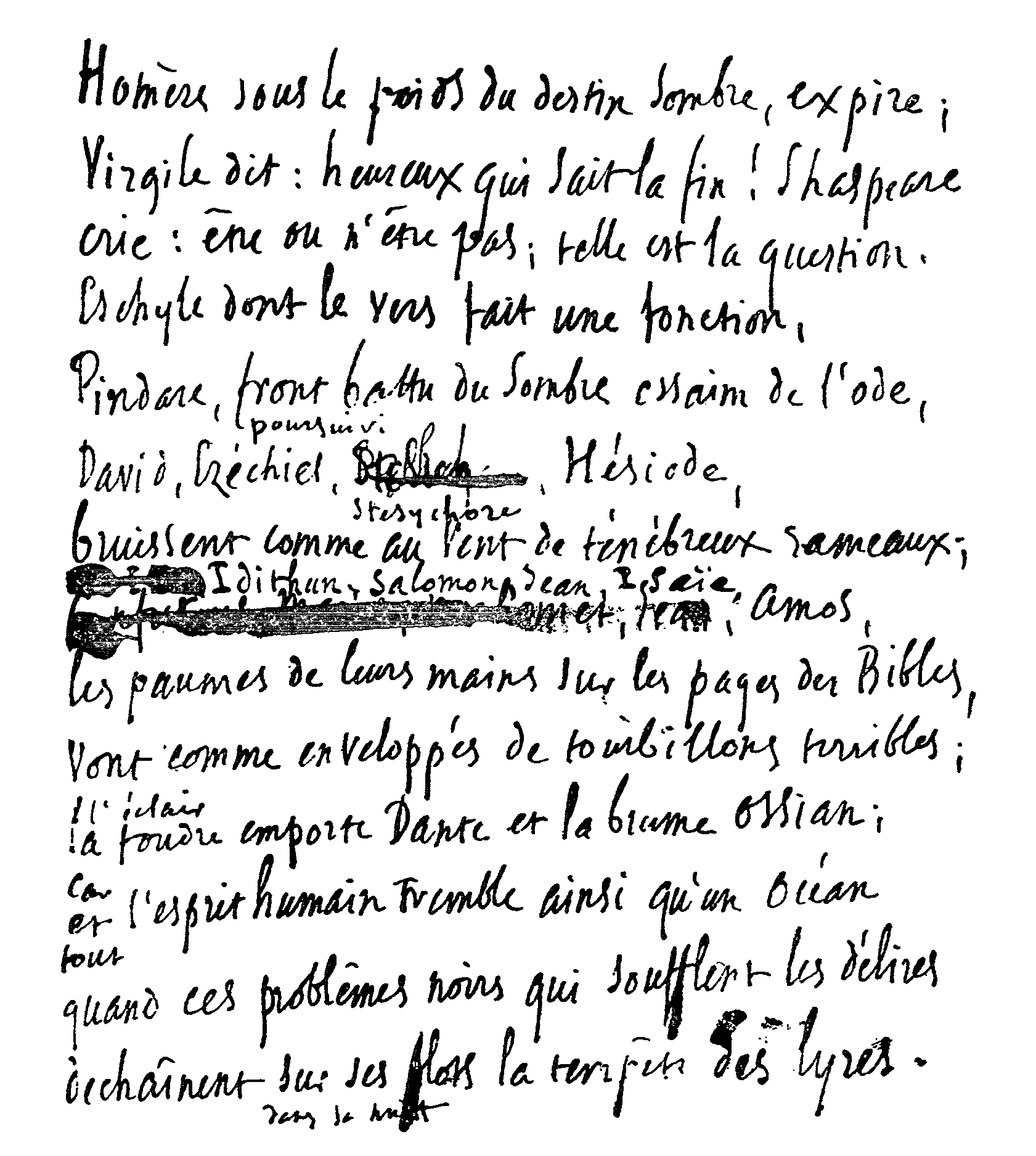
Toute la Lyre part of manuscript

Toute la Lyre is a posthumous collection of poems by Victor Hugo. The collection includes unpublished poems during his lifetime including love poems to Léonie d'Aunet.

While the title is Hugo's, and had been previously announced, the selection was in fact made by Paul Meurice on the basis of the author's notes, and appeared in two instalments, in 1888 and 1893, with a revised version in 1897.

The collection gathered previously unpublished poems, mostly dating from between 1854 and 1875 (Hugo's most productive period) along with a handful from the 1840s, into seven groups, each group called a "string" (corde) of the lyre. There is an appendix, a "bronze string". Like Les Quatre Vents de l'esprit (1881), it was an attempt to display all the facets of Hugo's poetry by dipping into the immense reservoir of material available. Some later editions of Hugo's complete works have disregarded this collection as being too miscellaneous, preferring to return each poem to its chronological place.
