= Theodontius =

Author of a Latin work on mythology

Theodontius was the author of a now lost Latin work on mythology. He was extensively quoted in Giovanni Boccaccio's Genealogia Deorum Gentilium, but is otherwise almost unknown. Boccaccio says that he knew Theodontius's work through the Collections of Paul of Perugia, which Paul's wife burnt after his death (Genealogiae XV 6). In telling the legend of Bathyllus, however, Boccaccio complains that Theodontius was illegible except for Bathyllus's birth, from Phorcys and a marine monster (Genealogiae X 7), so he may have seen some of Theodontius's own writings; sources disagree on this. Some authorities think Boccaccio invented him.

Outside Boccaccio, there was a Theodontius, who wrote on the wars of Troy, and is quoted by Servius on Aeneid, I, 28; and the fourteenth century author Domenico Bandini, who made an index for the Genealogiae, calls him "Teodontius Campanus diligens investigator poetici figmenti". Carlo Landi argued in his 1930 monograph Demogorgone that Boccaccio's Theodontius was a Campanian philosopher, from between the 9th and 11th centuries.

Theodontius provided Boccaccio with euhemeristic and naturalistic interpretations of mythology, and philosophic speculations about mythology. He quotes the (also lost) Greek historian Philochorus. Most significantly, he is Boccaccio's source for the idea that all the gods were descended from Demogorgon, which Theodontius himself credited to Pronapides the Athenian.
