= Śuri =

Etruscan deity

- Solar god of light and darkness, volcanic fire and lightning, health and plague, and the underworld
- Member of the Novensiles
- Statue of Vejovis, one of Śuri's epithets
- Other names: Aita / Eita; Apulu / Aplu; Calu; Manth; Rath; Usil / Uśil; Vetis / Veivis
- Etruscan alphabet: 𐌑𐌖𐌛𐌉
- Major cult center: Mt. Soratte
- World: Sun; Underworld
- Weapons: volcanic eruptions; volcanic lightning; sledgehammer; sword; spear; bow and arrows
- Animals: wolf; goat
- Symbols: solar disc; halo; lead
- Adherents: Hirpi Sorani
- Gender: male
- Region: Italy
- Ethnic group: Etruscans; Capenates; Faliscans; Latins; Sabines
- Festivals: (Note: See § Worshippers.)

Genealogy
- Parents: Tinia (father); Semla (mother)
- Siblings: Artume (twin); Fufluns
- Consort: Catha

Equivalents
- Greek: Apollo; Hades; Pluto
- Hindu: Sūrya
- Norse: Surtr
- Roman: Apollo; Dīs Pater; Vejovis; Summanus; Pluto

Śuri (Etruscan: 𐌑𐌖𐌛𐌉, lit. 'black'), Latinized as Soranus, was an ancient Etruscan infernal, volcanic and solar fire god, also venerated by other Italic peoples – among them Capenates, Faliscans, Latins and Sabines – and later adopted into ancient Roman religion.

He was variously depicted as: a crowned young man wielding a spear or bow and arrows; an enthroned black-bearded man with a wolf-skin cap or wolf-like appearance; or even a winged humanoid monster, usually wielding a sledgehammer or a sword.

== Name and attributes ==
The Etruscan theonym Śuri (Etruscan: 𐌑𐌖𐌛𐌉, from 𐌑𐌖𐌛, śur, 'black') means both 'black' and 'from the black [place]', i.e. the underworld.

Śuri was essentially a chthonic solar deity: (Note: A black sun, i.e. a sun god of the underworld, rather that a celestial god, was also defined by the Etruscans as Tinia Calusna (Jupiter of the Underworld, equivalent to Greek Zeus Chthonios).) the volcanic fire god of light and darkness, lord of the sun and the underworld, with powers over health and plague as well. Furthermore, as god of volcanic lightning, he was considered to be among the Novensiles, the nine Etruscan thunder gods.

He was also an oracular god. His sacred animals were wolves and goats.

=== Epithets and Greco-Roman equivalents ===
Because of his multiple attributes, the Etruscan fire god Śuri bore many epithets, among them infernal theonyms – consistently associated with kingship over the Manes (underworld deities), infernal and volcanic attributes, fire, lightning, wolves and goats – like Manth (𐌌𐌀𐌍𐌈, Manθ, Latinized as Mantus), (Note: Manth (𐌌𐌀𐌍𐌈) and Mania (𐌌𐌀𐌍𐌉𐌀): The epithets of this divine couple indicate that they were connected to the Manes, chthonic divinities or spirits of the dead in ancient Roman belief and called man(im) by the Etruscans. Their names are also linked to Mana Genita and Manius, as well as the Greek Mania (or Maniae), goddess of insanity and madness. Both the Greek and Latin Mania derive from PIE (Proto-Indo-European) *men-, "to think." Cognates include Ancient Greek μένος, ménos, 'mind, thought', and Avestan 𐬎𐬫𐬥𐬌𐬀𐬨, mainyu, 'spirit'. Cfr. Latin: Summanus (supposedly a contraction from Summus Manium, lit. 'the highest of the Manes'), Roman nocturnal thunder god of unclear Etruscan origins.) Vetis (𐌅𐌄𐌕𐌉𐌔, also spelt 𐌅𐌄𐌉𐌅𐌉𐌔, Veivis, variously Latinized as Vēdius, Vēdiovis, Vēiovis or Vēive), Calu (𐌂𐌀𐌋𐌖), lit. 'dark' or 'darkness' or 'underworld', and – by interpretatio graeca – the equivalent foreignism Aita (𐌀𐌉𐌕𐌀, also spelt 𐌄𐌉𐌕𐌀, Eita), from Epic Greek: Ἄϊδης, romanized: Áïdēs, lit. 'Hades' or 'underworld', syncretised with Roman Dīs Pater; as well as solar theonyms – consistently associated with solar and volcanic attributes, fire, lightning, wolves and goats – like Rath (𐌛𐌀𐌈, Raθ), (Note: Rath (𐌛𐌀𐌈, Raθ), lit. 'chariot' or 'sun chariot', cognate to Hindi: रथ, romanized: rath, lit. 'chariot' (cfr. Hindi: dharma-rath, lit. 'godly chariot'), learned borrowing from Sanskrit: रथ, romanized: rátha and Avestan: 𐬭𐬀𐬚𐬀, romanized: raθa, lit. 'chariot, car', from Proto-Indo-Iranian *hrátʰas, from Proto-Indo-European *hreth₂- ("to roll"). Cfr. Egyptian Ra.) Usil (𐌖𐌔𐌉𐌋, also spelt 𐌖𐌑𐌉𐌋, Uśil), (Note: Reference: File:Usil, Nethuns, Thesan.jpg: Bronze mirror from Tuscania. From left to right, Nethuns, Usil, Thesan. In the lower exergue a winged anguiped demon who holds up a dolphin in each hand. Vatican Museums, Museo Gregoriano Etrusco.) lit. 'light' or 'sun', (Note: Usil (𐌖𐌔𐌉𐌋, also spelt 𐌖𐌑𐌉𐌋, Uśil), from the Proto-Indo-European root *seh₂ul₂ (lit. 'sun'), hence cognate to Latin: Sol, Old Norse: Sól and Baltic languages: Saulė.) and the equivalent foreignism Apulu (𐌀𐌐𐌖𐌋𐌖, also spelt 𐌀𐌐𐌋𐌖, Aplu), from the Greco-Roman Apollo, (Note: The name Apulu or Aplu did not come directly from Greece but via a Latin center, probably Palestrina.) identified with Śuri (Latin: Soranus) and later syncretised by the Romans as Apollo Soranus or Apollo Soractis. These theonyms were also associated on Pyrgi inscriptions.

== Worship ==
=== Cult centers ===
The center of his cult was Mount Soracte, a sacred mountain located north of Rome, isolated in the middle of the countryside, in an area characterized by deep karst cavities and secondary volcanic phenomena; these phenomena were associated in antiquity with underworld deities, whom the area was hence sacred to, such as the Roman Dīs Pater, syncretised with Śuri (Latin: Soranus).

Multiple cities were dedicated to this deity, among them the twin cities of Surina (Soriano) and Surina (Viterbo), in the present-day province of Viterbo, Latium, as well as the city of Sorano, in the present-day province of Grosseto, Tuscany.

Furthermore, his theonym Manth (Latin: Mantus) is the eponymous of Mantua (Etruscan: Manthva, Italian: Mantova), birthplace of Virgil, who also mentioned the volcanic god in the Aeneid. This theonym was primarily used in the Po Valley (Etruria Padana, Northern Italy), as described by Servius, but a sanctuary with dedications from the Archaic period was also found in Pontecagnano, province of Salerno (Etruria Campana, Southern Italy).

Besides, according to Mauro Cristofani, the sun god was also worshipped in Cortona, Populonia and Magliano. Temples and votives were also found in Tuscania and Tarquinia, where there are also traces of a priestly college.

=== Worshippers ===
The priests of Soranus were called Hirpi Sorani, lit. 'Wolves of Soranus' (from Sabine: hirpus, lit. 'wolf'). They were considered skillful ornithomantists and firewalkers; during the ceremonies, they walked on hot coals, holding the entrails of sacrificed goats. Furthermore, during the annual festivities in honor of Apollo Soranus and Feronia, (Note: Feronia, goddess of fertility, wildlife and freedom (also venerated by Faliscans and Sabines), was considered to be the consort of his brother Fufluns (𐌚𐌖𐌚𐌋𐌖𐌍𐌔, also spelt 𐌐𐌖𐌘𐌋𐌖𐌍𐌔, Puphluns), god of growth, lifeforce and wine; son of Tinia and Semla, Fufluns was later syncretised with the Greco-Roman god Dionysus (Bacchus), son of Zeus and Semele. (Note: See Semla and Semele § Etymology.)) they walked barefoot among burning logs without being burned, for which they were forever released by the Roman Senate from military service and other liturgies. The Lupercalia, in the Roman religion, probably derive from these priests.

Servius has preserved the following legend about them: once, during a sacrifice to Dīs Pater, several wolves ran up to the altar and stole the sacrificial pieces. The shepherds gave chase and ran to a cave – into Mount Soracte – from which such suffocating fumes emanated that those who pursued fell dead. The pestilence that soon spread throughout the country was connected with the death of the shepherds, while the oracle, to whom they turned for advice on how to get rid of the plague, replied that the plague would stop as soon as the inhabitants, like wolves, began to lead a robber life. These people took the name Hirpi Sorani (from Sabine: hirpus, lit. 'wolf') and devoted themselves to the cult of Soranus, later identified with Dīs Pater due their shared volcanic and underworld attributes.

== Partners ==
Śuri has been historically associated with two female partners: the aforementioned Feronia, celebrated alongside him and considered to be his sister-in-law, whose major sanctuary (Latin: Lucus Feroniae) was located near Mount Soracte; and Catha (𐌂𐌀𐌈𐌀, Caθa), considered to be his consort, goddess of the moon and the underworld.

Paired with Śuri and all his epithets, his consort Catha also bore several ones, which varied accordingly, e.g.: his theonym Manth (Latin: Mantus) was paired with Mania (𐌌𐌀𐌍𐌉𐌀), whereas his theonym Aita was paired with Persipnei (𐌐𐌄𐌛𐌔𐌉𐌐𐌍𐌄𐌉, also spelt 𐌘𐌄𐌛𐌔𐌉𐌐𐌍𐌀𐌉, Phersipnai), equivalent to the Greco-Roman theonym Persephone (Latin: Proserpina).

=== Liver of Piacenza ===
Under the solar theonym Usil (lit. 'light' or 'sun'), Śuri is named alongside Catha on the right lobe (convex face) of the bronze Liver of Piacenza, which is separated into two lobes. Initially, some researchers supposed that the first lobe, where the gods of the lights and heavens are listed, could represent him, whereas the second an hypothetical partner named Tiur. In fact, his name appears next to the word tiur (lit. 'moon' or 'month'), that was purported to be the name of a lunar goddess, allegedly his consort, but since tiur actually meant "moon" and "month" (lunar month, equivalent to Greek mēnē), that inscription was most likely meant as a datation, as in the Pyrgi Tablets, while his consort, also known by multiple epithets, was actually named Catha.

== Mentions and iconography ==
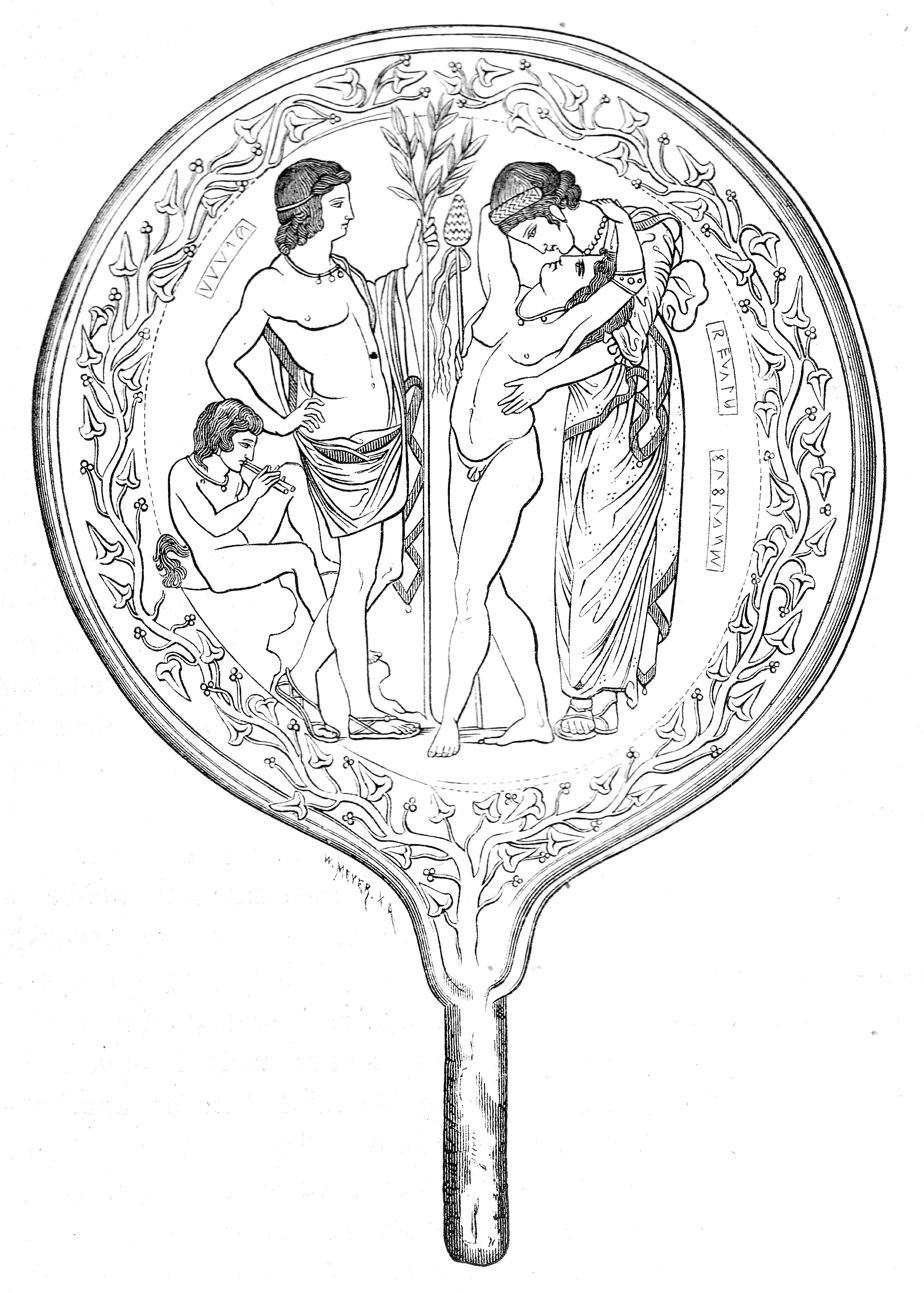
Drawing from this Etruscan bronze mirror showing Semla embracing the young Fufluns with Aplu looking on and a young satyr playing an aulos.

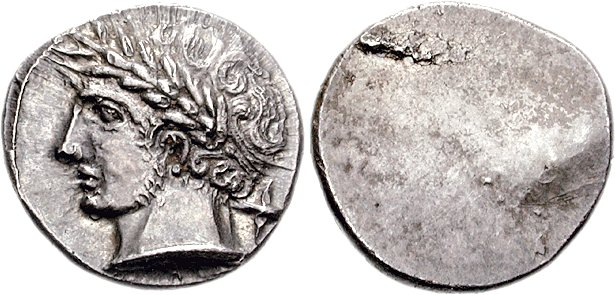
The god on a coin from Populonia.

Even outside his cult centers, Śuri is mentioned in multiple archaeological sites and artifacts, e.g. the bilingual Phoenician–Etruscan Pyrgi Tablets, the Lead Plaque of Magliano, and the Tabula Capuana. His mentions and depictions also reflect his multiple attributes and epithets, for example his solar theonyms in Pyrgi, Caere, and the aforementioned Liver of Piacenza.

Mentioned as son of the supreme sky god Tinia and the earth goddess Semla, brother of Fufluns and twin brother of Aritimi, he is primarily known for his powers over the sun, lightning, healing and plague, and divination, as well as for his volcanic and infernal characteristics.

=== Chthonic sun deity ===
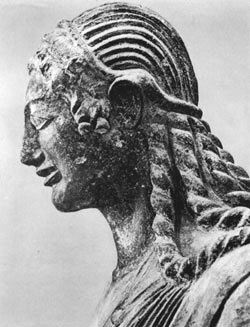
The Apollo of Veii, c. 510–500 BCE. National Etruscan Museum.

Frequently in associatiation with the aforementioned foreignism Apulu (which does not appear on the Liver of Piacenza), equivalent to his native theonyms Rath, Usil and Vetis, he is often depicted in art with a crown and laurel branches. His most famous representation, known as the Apollo of Veii, is a painted terracotta statue from Veii, Latium, attributed to Vulca.

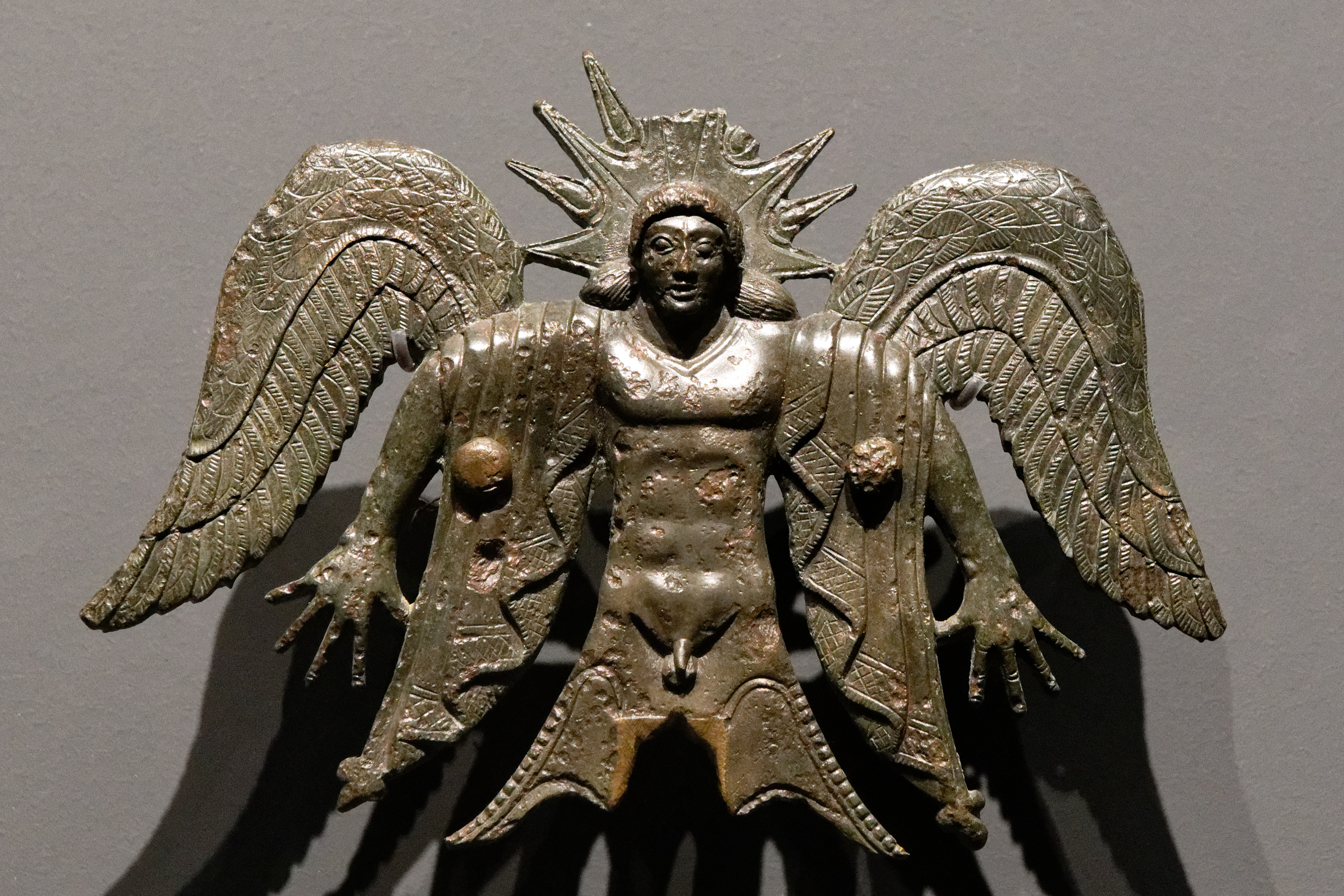
Chariot fitting representing the sun god. Vulci, c. 500–475 BCE. State Hermitage Museum.

In the Etruscan iconography, his theonym Usil (also mentioned on the Liver of Piacenza) is the representation of power and strength. His iconic depiction features the sun god rising out of the sea, with a fireball in either outstretched hand, on an engraved Etruscan bronze mirror in late Archaic style, formerly on the Roman antiquities market. On Etruscan mirrors in Classical style, he appears with a halo. Syncretised with the Greek Helios and Roman Sol, and later Apollo (Apulu), the sun god also appears on an Etruscan mirror from the Vatican dating from the 4th century BC, on which Usil is seen holding the bow of Apulu.

Besides, in artwork Usil is shown in close association with Thesan, the dawn goddess, something almost never seen with Helios and Eos. However, while Usil is depicted as male in most artworks, there are also feminine depictions.

=== Chthonic wolf deity ===
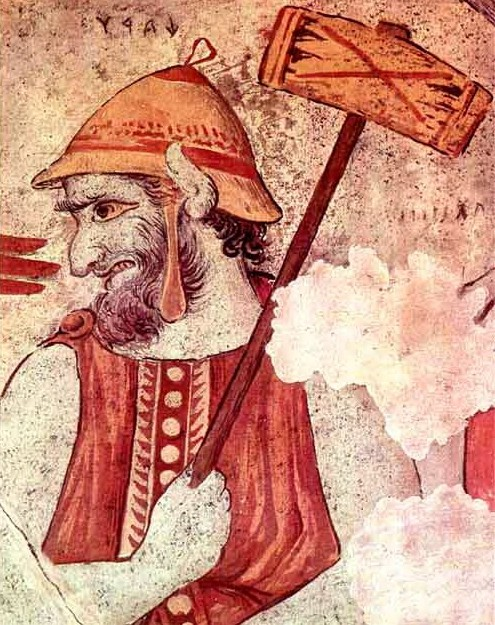
The god in animalistic appearance. François Tomb, Vulci, 4th century BCE.

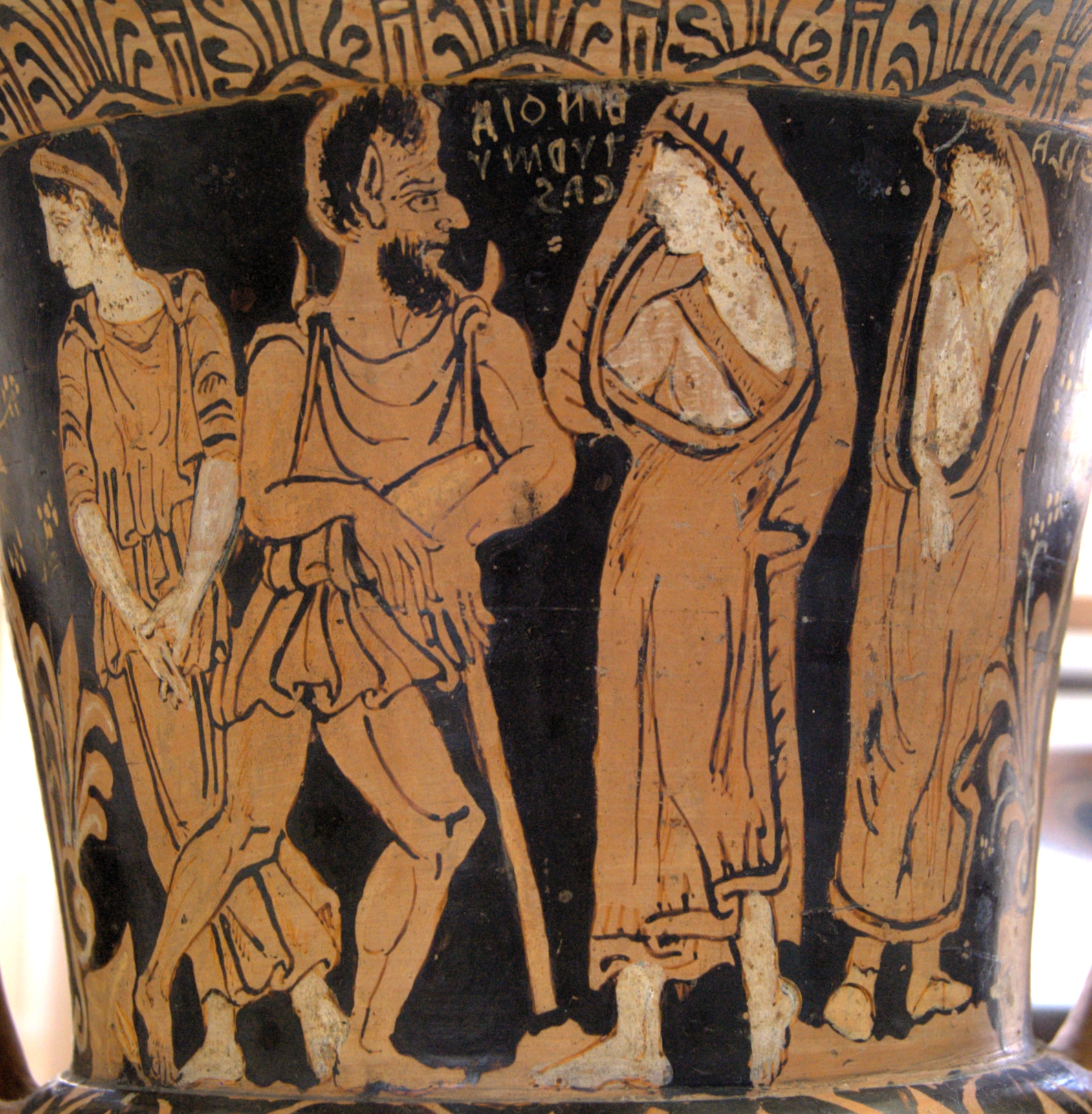
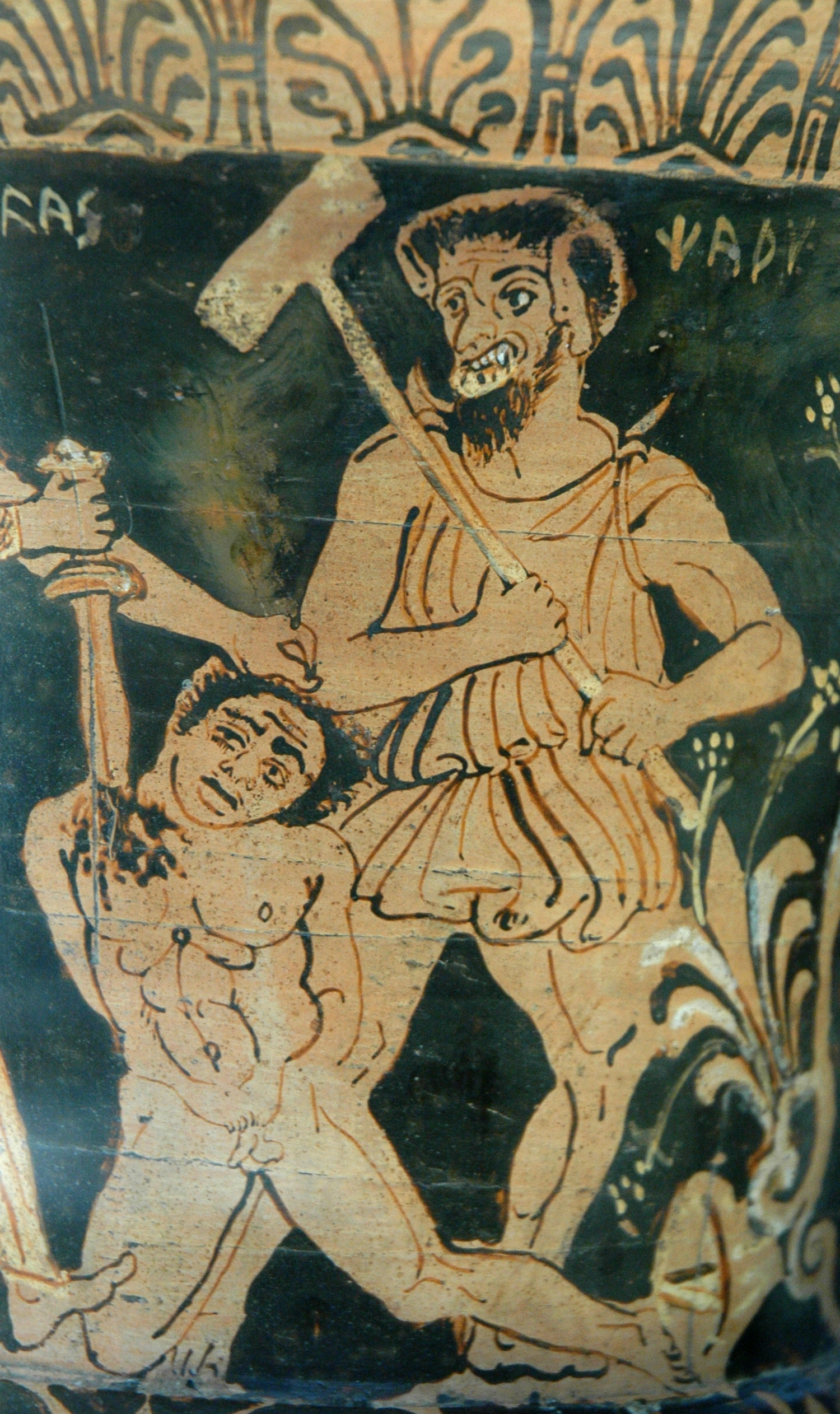
Typical depictions of Charun. From an Etruscan red-figure calyx-crater. End of the 4th century BCE, or beginning of the 3rd. On the right: Ajax killing a Trojan prisoner in front of Charun.

The god – also known as Manth, king of the Manes – also acts as psychopomp: he guides the souls of the deceased into the underworld, getting occasionally nicknamed Charun (Etruscan: 𐌙𐌀𐌛Υ, romanized: Kʰaru, from Greek Charon) and associated with the feminine counterpart Vanth. He is also known as a trickster god and bringer of misfortune, because he would attract the attention of his victims through trickery, thus stealing their souls. As such, he is often depicted on Etruscan coffins as a black-bearded animalistic man or satyr, with pale skin (symbolizing the decay of death), pointed ears, (Note: Graeme Barker and Tom Rasmussen compare his ears to those of an ass; Rovin compares them to a boar like the tusks.) and enormous wings, wearing a tunic and sometimes a crown or a cap, usually wielding a sledgehammer or a sword. (Note: Other recurring traits of Charun were the heavy brow ridges, fiery eyes, a vulture's hooked nose, large lips and tusks, snake-like hair, and snakes around his arm.)

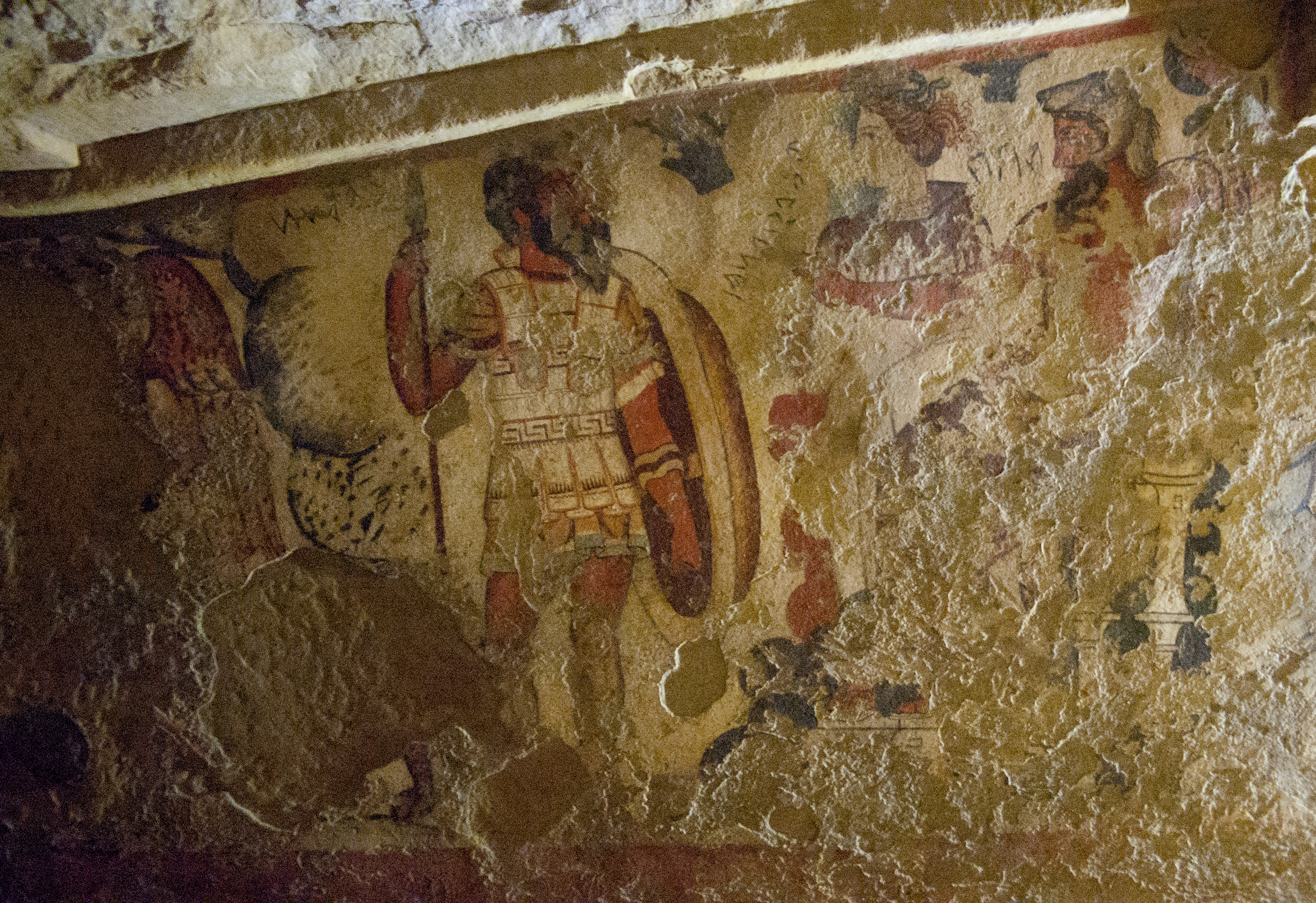
Aita (Etruscan: 𐌀𐌉𐌕𐌀) and Phersipnai (Etruscan: 𐌘𐌄𐌛𐌔𐌉𐌐𐌍𐌀𐌉). Tomba dell'Orco II, Tarquinia.

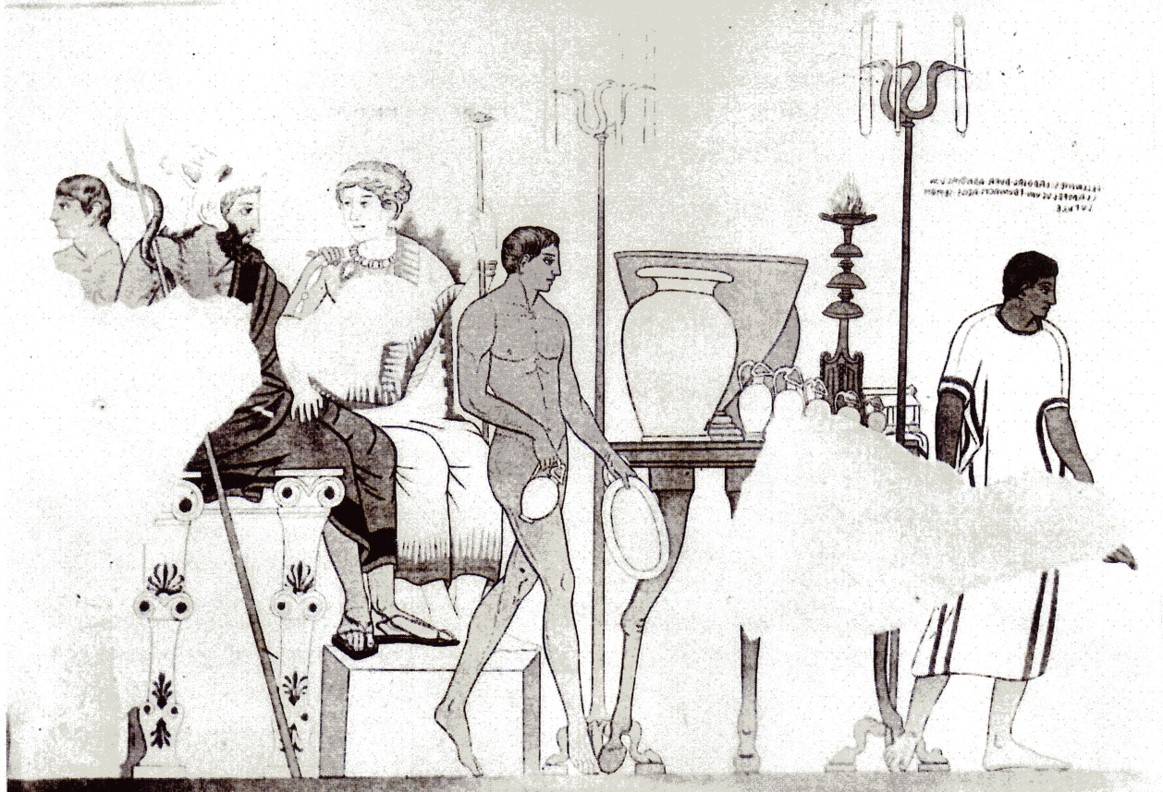
Tomba Golini, Orvieto.

This animalistic god of the dead, also called Calu (lit. 'dark' or 'darkness' or 'underworld'), is equally identified by his wolf attributes, such as a wolf-like appearance or a wolf-skin cap; and although the equivalent grecism Aita (lit. 'Hades' or 'underworld') is very rarely depicted, he may appear enthroned and sometimes wears a wolf-skin cap, borrowing a key attribute from earlier Calu.

Indeed, the theonym Aita is a relatively late addition to the Etruscan pantheon, appearing in iconography and in Etruscan text beginning in the 4th century BC, and is heavily influenced by his Greek counterpart, Hades. Pictured in only a few instances in Etruscan tomb painting, such as in the Golini Tomb from Orvieto and the tomb of Orcus II from Tarquinia, he is shown with his consort Persipnei or Phersipnai, the Etruscan equivalent to the Greek Persephone. Other examples of Aita in Etruscan art depict his abduction of Persipnei. Aside from tomb painting, he may be identified in a few examples in other media, including on a 4th-century painted vase from Vulci, two 2nd century alabaster ash urns from Volterra, and a red-figure 4th–3rd century oinochoe.

=== Chthonic lightning deity ===
In addition to their inherent attributes over light and darkness, Śuri and all his epithets (e.g. his infernal theonym Aita, or solar theonyms Usil and Apulu) were consistently associated with kingship, fire and lightnings, health and plague, wolves and goats; attributes also shared with his aforementioned theonyms Manth (Latin: Mantus) and Vetis (also spelt Veivis; variously Latinized as Vēdius, Vēdiovis, Vēiovis or Vēive), as well as their Roman spin-off Summanus.

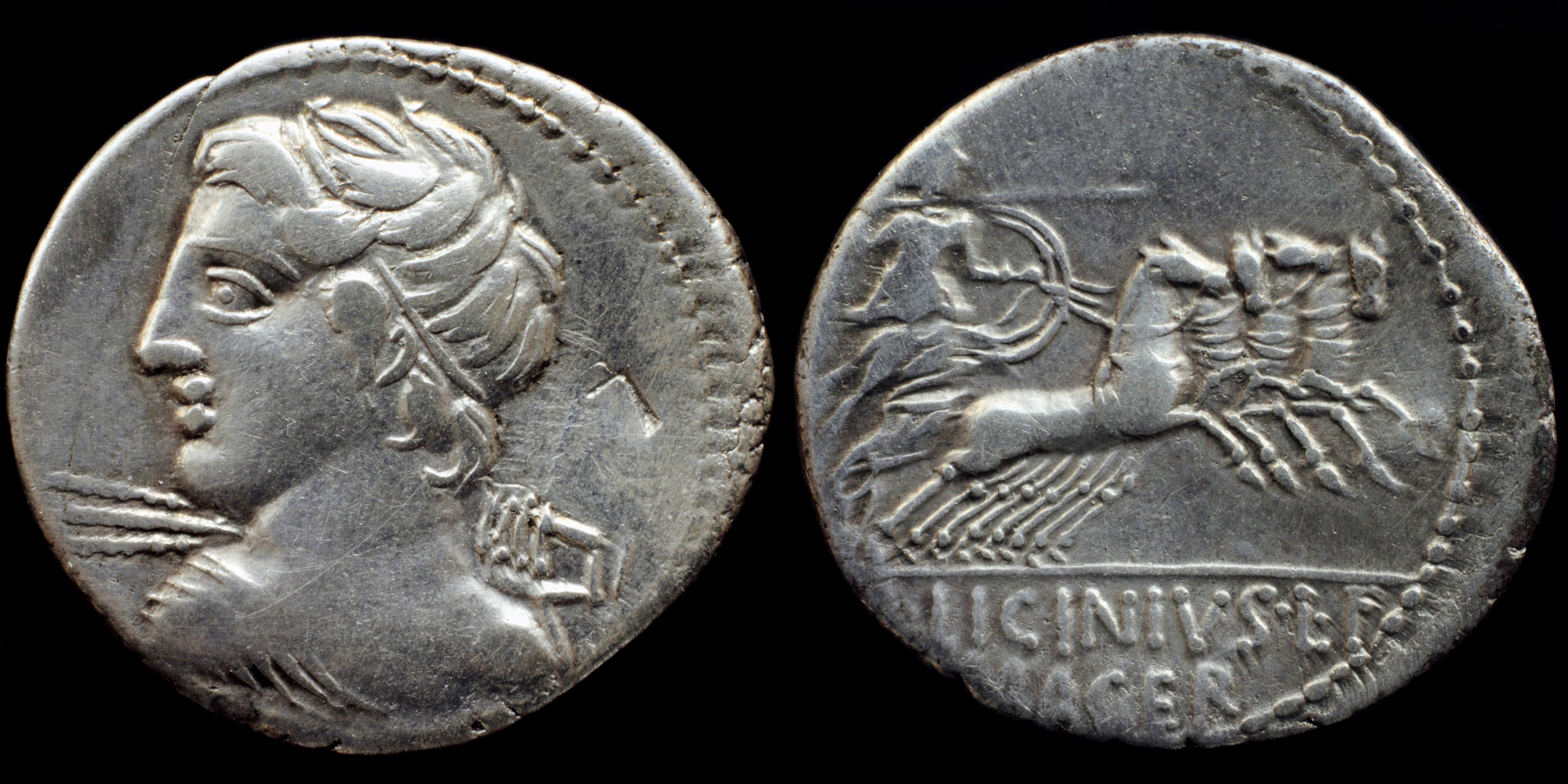

First side of the image: O: Diademed bust of Vejovis hurling thunderbolt.
Second side of the image: R: Minerva with javelin and shield riding quadriga.
Silver denarius struck in Rome, 84 BC.

Romans believed that Vejovis was one of the first gods to be born. Portrayed as a young man, holding a bunch of arrows, pilum or lightning bolts in his hand, and accompanied by a goat – he was consistently associated with volcanic eruptions and healing, getting occasionally identified as a young version of Jupiter, Apollo, or Asclepius.

Aulus Gellius, in the Noctes Atticae, speculated that Vejovis was an ill-omened counterpart of Jupiter (compare Summanus), observing that the particle ve- that prefixes the name of the god also appears in Latin words such as vesanus, 'insane', and thus interpreting the name Vejovis as the anti-Jove.

Vejovis had three festivals in the Roman Calendar: on 1 January 7 March, and 21 May. He was mostly worshipped in Rome and Bovillae, in Latium. On the Capitoline Hill and on the Tiber Island, temples were erected in his honour. Among them, there was a temple between the two peaks of the Capitoline Hill in Rome, where his statue carried a bundle of arrows and stood next to a statue of a she-goat. In spring, multiple goats were sacrificed to him to avert plagues. Gellius informs us that Vejovis received the sacrifice of a female goat, sacrificed ritu humano; this obscure phrase could either mean "after the manner of a human sacrifice" or "in the manner of a burial." These offerings were less about the animal sacrificed and more about the soul sacrificed.

==== Summanus ====
Summanus – Latin: Summānus, supposedly from Summus Manium, 'the greatest of the Manes', or sub-, 'under' + manus, 'hand' – was the god of nocturnal thunder in ancient Roman religion, as counterposed to Jupiter, the god of diurnal (daylight) thunder. (Note: Georges Dumézil has argued that Summanus would represent the uncanny, violent and awe-inspiring element of the gods of the first function, connected to heavenly sovereignty. The double aspect of heavenly sovereign power would be reflected in the dichotomy Varuna-Mitra in Vedic religion and in Rome in the dichotomy Summanus-Dius Fidius. The first gods of these pairs would incarnate the violent, nocturnal, mysterious aspect of sovereignty while the second ones would reflect its reassuring, daylight and legalistic aspect. Coincidentally, the aforementioned Feronia (see § Partners), venerated and celebrated with Apollo Soranus, likely inherited her name from Varuna or Rudra.)

His precise nature was unclear even to Ovid. Pliny thought that he was of Etruscan origin, and one of the nine gods of thunder. Varro, however, lists Summanus among gods he considers of Sabine origin, to whom king Titus Tatius dedicated altars (arae) in consequence of a votum. Paulus Diaconus considers him a god of lightning.

The temple of Summanus was dedicated during the Pyrrhic War c. 278 BCE on 20 June. It stood at the west of the Circus Maximus, perhaps on the slope of the Aventine. It seems the temple had been dedicated because the statue of the god which stood on the roof of the temple of Jupiter Capitolinus had been struck by a lightning bolt. Cicero recounts that the clay statue of the god which stood on the roof of the Temple of Jupiter Optimus Maximus was struck by a lightning bolt: its head was nowhere to be seen. The haruspices announced that it had been hurled into the Tiber River, where indeed it was found on the very spot indicated by them. The temple of Summanus itself was struck by lightning in 197 BCE.

Every 20 June, the day before the summer solstice, round cakes called summanalia, made of flour, milk, and honey and shaped as wheels, were offered to him as a token of propitiation: the wheel might be a solar symbol. Summanus also received a sacrifice of two black oxen or wethers. Dark animals were typically offered to chthonic deities. Saint Augustine records that in earlier times Summanus had been more exalted than Jupiter, but with the construction of a temple that was more magnificent than that of Summanus, Jupiter became more honored.

Mount Summano – located in the Alps near Vicenza, Veneto – is traditionally considered a site of the cults of Pluto, Summanus, and the Manes. The mountaintop is frequently struck by lightning. The mountain itself has a deep grotto in which, according to local legend, a young shepherdess became lost and disappeared. The story might be an adaptation of the Greek, Etruscan and later Roman myth of Proserpina, who was abducted by Pluto.

== Further connections ==
=== Norse mythology ===
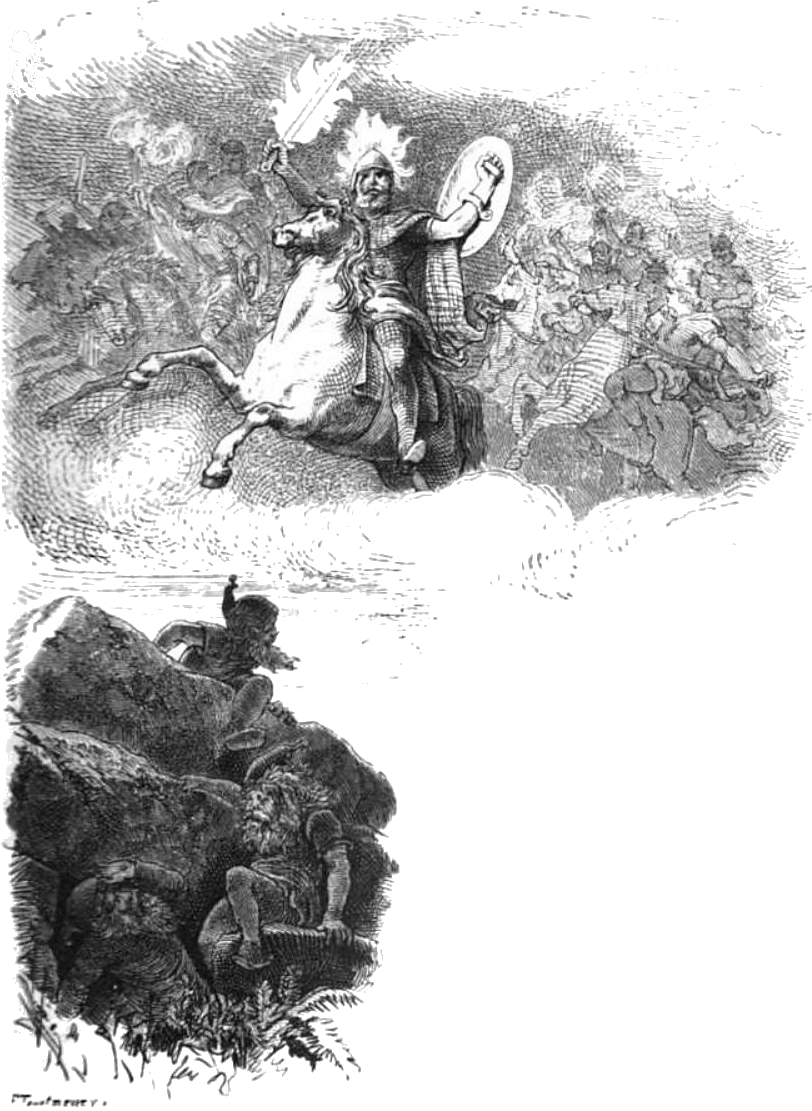
Surtr with the Flaming Sword (1882) by F. W. Heine, based on a plaster frieze by F. W. Engelhard (1859).

The Etruscan theonym Śuri, lit. 'black', is somehow cognate to Old Norse Surtr, lit. 'black'. In Norse mythology, Surtr – king of the fire giants of Múspell, (Note: Drawing in part on various eddic poems, the Gylfaginning section of the Prose Edda contains an account of the development and creation of the cosmos: Long before the Earth came to be, there existed the bright and flaming place called Muspell – a location so hot that foreigners may not enter it – and the foggy land of Niflheim. In Niflheim was a spring, Hvergelmir, and from it flow numerous rivers. Together these rivers, known as Élivágar, flowed further and further from their source. Eventually the poisonous substance within the flow came to harden and turn to ice. When the flow became entirely solid, a poisonous vapor rose from the ice and solidified into rime atop the solid river. These thick ice layers grew, in time spreading across the void of Ginnungagap.) (Note: The etymology of "Muspelheim" is uncertain, but may come from Mund-spilli, "world-destroyers", "wreck of the world".) (Note: The Prose Edda section Gylfaginning foretells that the sons of Muspell will break the Bifröst bridge as part of the events of Ragnarök: In the midst of this clash and din the heavens are rent in twain, and the sons of Muspell come riding through the opening. Surtr rides first, and before him and after him flames burning fire. He has a very good sword, which shines brighter than the sun. As they ride over Bifrost it breaks to pieces, as has before been stated. The sons of Muspel direct their course to the plain which is called Vigrid ... . The sons of Muspel have there effulgent bands alone by themselves.) birthplace of the Sun and other stars – is "a mighty giant who ruled the volcanic powers of the underworld" and will cover the Earth in fire during Ragnarök, causing the entire world to burn. Rudolf Simek notes that jötnar – frost and fire giants – are usually described as living to the east in Old Norse sources, yet Surtr is described as being from the south. Indeed, Surtr is mentioned twice in the poem Völuspá, where a völva divulges information to the god Odin. The völva says that, during Ragnarök, Surtr will come from the south with flames, carrying a sword brighter than the sun:

Old Norse

Sutr ferr sunnan
með sviga lævi:
skinn af sverði
sól valtiva.

Translation:
English

Surtr moves from the south
with the scathe of branches:
there shines from his sword
the sun of Gods of the Slain.

These and other apparent coincidences inspired the hypothesis that Surtr's mythic south could be identified in Śuri's Etruscan Italy, but, despite the archaeological findings confirm ancient exchanges among the Tyrrhenians and the Proto-Germanic peoples, (Note: Examples include the Negau helmet, the Meldorf inscription and the spearhead of Kovel.) systematic studies of comparative mythology and linguistics, as well as additional archaeological surveys, may still be needed to confirm deeper connections.

== See also ==
- Apollo Smintheus – A chthonic epithet of Apollo
- Etruscan art – Art of the ancient Etruscan civilization
- Etruscan civilization – Pre-Roman civilization of Etruria (9th–1st century BC)
- Etruscan mythology
  - List of Etruscan mythological figures
- Sethlans – God in Etruscan mythology
- Surya – Solar deity in Hinduism
- Suryastra – Celestial weapon used by warriors in Hindu Epics
- Ulfheðnar – Old Norse legendary wolf-warriors

== Notes and references ==
=== Works cited ===
- Adiego Lajara, Ignasi-Xavier [in Catalan] (2016). "The Etruscan Texts of the Pyrgi Golden Tablets: Certainties and Uncertainties". In Bellelli, Vincenzo; Xella, Paolo (eds.). Le lamine di Pyrgi: Nuovi studi sulle iscrizione in etrusco e in fenicio nel cinquantenario della scoperta. Vol. I–X. Verona. p. 155 – via Academia.edu.
- Adkins, Lesley; Adkins, Roy Arthur (1996). Dictionary of Roman Religion. Facts On File. ISBN 978-0-8160-3005-7.
- Augustine (1887) [c. 426]. "Concerning Felicity, whom the Romans, who venerate many gods, for a long time did not worship with divine honor, though she alone would have sufficed instead of all". In Schaff, Philip (ed.). The City of God. Vol. IV. Translated by Dods, Marcus. 23. "For, as we read in their own authors, the ancient Romans paid greater honors to I know not what Summanus, to whom they attributed nocturnal thunderbolts, than to Jupiter, to whom diurnal thunderbolts were held to pertain. But, after a famous and conspicuous temple had been built to Jupiter, owing to the dignity of the building, the multitude resorted to him in so great numbers, that scarce one can be found who remembers even to have read the name of Summanus, which now he cannot once hear named."
- Babelon, Ernest (1885). Description historique et chronologique des monnaies de la République romaine: vulgairement appelées monnaies consulaires (in French). Vol. 1. L Rollin et Feuardent.
- Ball Platner, Samuel (1929) [1904, Boston: Allyn & Bacon]. "Iuppiter Optimus Maximus Capitolinus, aedes". In Ashby, Thomas (ed.). A Topographical Dictionary of Ancient Rome. London: Oxford University Press. p. 408 – via Perseus Digital Library.
- Barker, Graeme William Walter; Rasmussen, Tom (2000) [1998]. The Etruscans. Malden: Blackwell Publishing. p. 242.
- Beazley, John Davidson (November 1949). "The World of the Etruscan Mirror". The Journal of Hellenic Studies. 69 (1–17): 3, fig. 1. doi:10.2307/629458. JSTOR 629458.
- Bonfante, Giuliano; Bonfante, Larissa (2002) [1983]. The Etruscan Language: An Introduction (2 ed.). Manchester University Press. ISBN 978-0-7190-5540-9.
- Bonfante, Larissa; Swaddling, Judith (2006). Etruscan Myths. The Legendary Past (77). British Museum & University of Texas. ISBN 978-0-7141-2238-0.
- Bonnefoy, Yves, ed. (1992) [1991]. Roman and European Mythologies. Translated by Doniger, Wendy. University of Chicago Press. pp. 30, 36. ISBN 978-0-226-06455-0.
  - Pallottino, Massimo (1992a). "Pre-Roman Italy". In Bonnefoy (1992), p. 30.
  - Pallottino, Massimo (1992b). "Etruscan Religion". In Bonnefoy (1992), p. 36.
- Böttiger, Carl Wilhelm (1857). Bidrag till kännedomen om Etruskerna (in Swedish). p. 18.
- Briquel, Dominique (1999). La civilisation étrusque (in French). Paris: Fayard. ISBN 978-2-213-60385-8.
- Capella, Martianus (1836) [c. 420, Carthage]. De nuptiis Philologiae et Mercurii (in Latin). Vol. II. Frankfurt am Main: Varrentrapp. 164.
- Chhawchharia, Ajai Kumar (2015). The Chariot of God: Dharma Rath. CreateSpace Independent Publishing Platform. ISBN 978-1-5169-5377-6.
- Chisholm, Hugh, ed. (1911). "Summanus" . Encyclopædia Britannica. Vol. 26 (11th ed.). Cambridge University Press. pp. 77–78.
- Cicero, Marcus Tullius. De divinatione (in Latin). Vol. I. 10.
- Cicero, Marcus Tullius (1998). De natura deorum [The Nature of the Gods] (in Latin and English). Translated by Walsh, Patrick Gerard [in German]. Oxford University Press. p. 207. ISBN 978-0-19-282511-7. "Vediovis"
- Classical Association (1918). Postgate, John Percival; Arnold, Edward Vernon; Hall, Frederick William (eds.). Classical Quarterly. Translated by Postgate, John Percival. Clarendon Press. p. 107.
- Colonna, Giovanni (2001). "Divinazione e culto di Rath/Apollo a Caere (a proposito del santuario in loc. S. Antonio)". Archeologia Classica (in Italian). LII (2). L'Erma di Bretschneider: 151–173. doi:10.1400/258393.
- Colonna, Giovanni (2009). "L'Apollo di Pyrgi, Śur/Śuri (il «Nero») e l'Apollo Sourios". Studi Etruschi (in Italian). LXXIII. Florence: Olschki: 101–134. ISSN 0391-7762.
- Crawford, Jackson (14 July 2021). Word Origins: Coincidence vs. Correspondence.
- Cristofani, Mauro, ed. (2000) [1984]. "Apulu/Aplu". Etruschi: una nuova immagine (in Italian). Florence: Giunti Editore. pp. 161–162. ISBN 978-88-09-01792-4.
- Cristofani, Mauro, ed. (1985). "Aplu". Dizionario illustrato della civiltà etrusca (in Italian). Florence: Giunti Editore. pp. 12–13. ISBN 978-88-09-21728-7.
- Cristofani, Mauro (1995). Tabula Capuana. Un calendario festivo di età arcaica. Biblioteca di Studi etruschi (in Italian). Florence: Olschki. ISBN 978-88-222-4322-5.
- "Culto di Soranus". Romano Impero (in Italian). July 2021.
- Daremberg, Charles Victor; Saglio, Edmond, eds. (1877–1919). "Mantus". Dictionnaire des antiquités grecques et romaines (in French). p. 1582 – via University of Toulouse-Jean Jaurès.
- "Definition of Vejovis, Vediovis, Vediiovis", The Latin Lexicon
- Delord, Robert (29 December 2011). "La religion étrusque". Arrête ton char (in French).
- De Grummond, Nancy Thomson (2004). "For the Mother and for the Daughter: Some Thoughts on Dedications from Etruria and Praeneste". Hesperia Supplements. 33. The American School of Classical Studies at Athens: 351–370. ISBN 978-0-87661-533-1. JSTOR 1354077.
- De Grummond, Nancy Thomson (2006). Etruscan Myth, Sacred History, and Legend. Philadelphia: University of Pennsylvania Museum of Archaeology and Anthropology. ISBN 978-1-931707-86-2.
- De Grummond, Nancy Thomson; Simon, Erika, eds. (2006). The Religion of the Etruscans. Austin: University of Texas Press. ISBN 978-0-292-78233-4.
  - Bonfante, Larissa. "Etruscan Inscriptions and Etruscan Religion". In De Grummond & Simon (2006), p. 11.
  - Colonna, Giovanni. "Sacred Architecture and the Religion of the Etruscans". In De Grummond & Simon (2006).
  - Krauskopf, Ingrid. "The Grave and Beyond". In De Grummond & Simon (2006), pp. VII, 73–75.
  - Simon, Erika. "Gods in Harmony: The Etruscan Pantheon". In De Grummond & Simon (2006).
- De Grummond, Nancy Thomson (2008). "Moon Over Pyrgi: Catha, an Etruscan Lunar Goddess?". American Journal of Archaeology. 112 (3). University of Chicago Press: 419–428. doi:10.3764/aja.112.3.419. ISSN 0002-9114. OCLC 5696010. S2CID 193046316.
- De Simone, Carlo (2012). "Il teonimo Šuri: riflessioni ad alta voce". Studi Epigrafici e Linguistici (in Italian) (32–33).
- Di Fazio, Massimiliano (2013). "Gli Hirpi del Soratte". In Cifani, Gabriele (ed.). Tra Roma e l'Etruria. Cultura, identità e territorio dei Falisci (in Italian). Edizioni Quasar. pp. 231–264. ISBN 978-88-7140-519-3 – via Academia.edu.
- Di Silvio, Paola (18 November 2014). "Suri: L'Apollo Nero Degli Etruschi". EreticaMente (in Italian). Archived from the original on 2 April 2023.
- Dronke, Ursula, ed. (1997). The Poetic Edda: Volume II: Mythological Poems. Translated by Dronke, Ursula. Oxford University Press. ISBN 978-0-19-811181-8.
- Dumézil, Georges (1948). "Mitra-Varuna: essai sur deux representations indoeuropeennes de la souveraineté". Myth et epopée (in French). Vol. III (2nd ed.). Paris: Gallimard. Part 2, chapter 3.
  - Dumézil, Georges (1988). Mitra-Varuna: an essay on two Indo-European representations of sovereignty. Translated by Coltman, Derek (2nd ed.). New York: Zone Books. ISBN 978-0-942299-12-0.
- Dumézil, Georges (1977) [1974, Paris]. La religion romaine archaïque (in French and Italian). Milan. p. 184.
  - Dumézil, Georges (1996). Archaic Roman religion: with an appendix on the religion of the Etruscans. Translated by Krapp, Philip. Baltimore: Johns Hopkins University Press. LCCN 96014884.
- Elliott, John Allen (1 January 1995). "The Etruscan Wolfman in Myth and Ritual". Etruscan Studies. 2 (1). De Gruyter: 17–33. doi:10.1515/etst.1995.2.1.17. ISSN 2566-9109. OCLC 1236841644. S2CID 194102662.
- Encyclopedia of World Religions. Encyclopædia Britannica. 2006. p. 803. ISBN 978-1-59339-266-6.
- Fee, Christopher R. (2004). Gods, Heroes, & Kings. Oxford University Press. ISBN 978-0-19-029170-9. "In The Baile in Scail ("The God's Prophecy") Lugh is seen as a sacred solar king and king of the otherworld, associated with Rosmerta, who is herself a kind of personification of Ireland, sometimes known as "the Sovranty of Ireland." Lugh followed Nuada as king of the gods in Ireland, and was with the mortal Dechtire the father of the great hero Cuchulainn."
- Fiesel, Eva (1930). "Mantus". Realencyclopädie der classischen Altertumswissenschaft (in German). Vol. XIV, 2. Stuttgart. pp. 1360–1361.
- Gellius, Aulus. "De nominibus deorum populi Romani Diovis et Vediovis". Noctes Atticae [Attic Nights] (in Latin). Vol. V. 12.
- Hart, George (2005). The Routledge Dictionary of Egyptian Gods and Goddesses. Psychology Press. p. 133. ISBN 978-0-415-34495-1.
- Haynes, Sybille (2000). Etruscan Civilization: A Cultural History. London: British Museum Press. ISBN 978-0-7141-2228-1.
- Jannot, Jean-René [in French] (2005). Religion in Ancient Etruria. Translated by Whitehead, J.K. University of Wisconsin Press. ISBN 978-0-299-20844-8.
- Jordanes. Romana (in Latin). Vol. I. 2, 14–15, 98–100.
- Kenney, Edward John; Clausen, Wendell Vernon (1983). The Cambridge History of Classical Literature. Vol. 2. Cambridge University Press. ISBN 978-0-521-27373-2.
- Lecce, Vittoria. "Novembre e il dio Suri - Il Nero Signore" (in Italian). Museo Nazionale Etrusco.
- Lexicon Iconographicum Mythologiae Classicae. Vol. I–VIII. Zurich, Munich, Düsseldorf: Artemis & Winkler Verlag. 1981–1999. ISBN 978-3-7608-8751-7.
  - Krauskopf, Ingrid (1988). "Aita/Calu". In LIMC. Vol. IV. pp. 394–399.
  - LIMC. Vol. VII. 1994.
- Livy. Ab urbe condita [History of Rome] (in Latin and English).
  - Livy. "Periochae". Ab urbe condita. Vol. XIV.
  - Livy. Ab urbe condita. Vol. XXXII. 29,1.
- Lübker, Friedrich (1855). Real Lexicon of Classical Antiquity (in German and Russian). Leipzig: B. G. Teubner Verlag. pp. 1303-1304: "Sorānus"
- L'institut. Section 1: Sciences mathématiques, physiques et naturelles (in French). Vol. 10. Imprimerie nationale. 1 January 1845.
- MacCrossan, Tadhg (29 May 2002). "Celtic Religion". Llewellyn Worldwide. "Lugus, like Odin, was king of the gods in the Celtic pantheon, was accompanied by crows and ravens, carried a spear, and closed one eye to do his magic (Odin offered his eye); like the Great Zeus in Hesiod's Theogony, he led the Tuatha Dé Danann gods in victory over the Fomorian giants. Lugh's birth and childhood also parallels that of Zeus."
- Maras, Daniele Federico (2010). "Suri. Il nero signore degli inferi". Archeo (in Italian). No. 305. Archived from the original on 10 December 2014.
- Mc Callister, Rick; Mc Callister, Silvia, eds. (1999). "CA-CE". Etruscan Glossary. "Calu"
- Noël Des-Vergers, Marie Joseph Adolphe (1863). "Sur la religion étrusque et sur les communications de l'Étrurie avec Rome pendant la période des rois". Comptes rendus des séances de l'Académie des Inscriptions et Belles-Lettres (in French). 7: 319–329. doi:10.3406/crai.1863.66776.
- Noël Des-Vergers, Marie Joseph Adolphe (1864) [1862]. L'Étrurie et les Étrusques (in French). Рипол-классик. ISBN 9785879679069.
- Museo Gregoriano Etrusco, Carrara Putto, cat. 12108, Rome: Vatican Museums, "[…] a votive offering to Selvans and to Śuri, etymologically the "black", a sort of underworld Apollo for the Etruscans. […] dedicated by an eminent personage to an urban shrine in ancient Tarquinia."
- Nonoss (2015). "Turan, Aritimi, Usil et l'énigmatique Letham..." Au Fil du Temps (in French).
- Obnorsky, Nikolai Petrovich [in Russian] (1900). "Соран, прозвище Аполлона". Brockhaus and Efron Encyclopedic Dictionary (in Russian). Vol. XXXa. Saint Petersburg: Brockhaus-Efron. p. 895.
- Orchard, Andy (1997). Dictionary of Norse Myth and Legend. Cassell. ISBN 978-0-304-34520-5.
- Orlin, Eric Michael (2002). "Foreign Cults in Republican Rome: Rethinking the Pomerial Rule". Memoirs of the American Academy in Rome. 47. University of Michigan Press: 5. doi:10.2307/4238789. JSTOR 4238789.
- Ovid. Fasti [On the Roman Calendar]. Loeb Classical Library (in Latin and English). Vol. VI. Translated by Frazer, James George. 729–731. p. 731: "quisquis is est, Summano templa feruntur" [The temple is said to have been dedicated to Summanus, whoever he may be]
- Paul the Deacon. Excerpta ex libris Pompei Festi de verborum significatu (in Latin). pp. 62, 65–66 – via Archivio della latinità italiana del Medioevo (ALIM). p. 66: "Dium fulgur appellabant diurnum, quod putabant Iovis, ut nocturnum Summani"
- Pettazzoni, Raffaele (1967) [1954, Leiden]. "The Wheel in the Ritual Symbolism of Some Indo-European Peoples". Essays on the History of Religions. Numen Book Series (Studies in the History of Religions). Vol. 1. Brill. p. 107. doi:10.1163/9789004377929_011. ISBN 978-90-04-38850-5. ISSN 0169-8834. OCLC 1067445354.
- Pliny the Elder (1855). Naturalis Historia [The Natural History] (in Latin and English). Translated by Bostock, John. London: Taylor & Francis – via Perseus Digital Library.
  - Pliny the Elder. Naturalis Historia [The Natural History] (in Latin and English). Vol. II. Translated by Bostock, John. 53 – via Perseus Digital Library. "Tuscorum litterae novem deos emittere fulmina existimant, eaque esse undecim generum; Iovem enim trina iaculari. Romani duo tantum ex iis servavere, diurna attribuentes Iovi, nocturna Summano, rariora sane eadem de causa frigidioris caeli" [The Tuscan books inform us, that there are nine Gods who discharge thunder-storms, that there are eleven different kinds of them, and that three of them are darted out by Jupiter. Of these the Romans retained only two, ascribing the diurnal kind to Jupiter, and the nocturnal to Summanus; this latter kind being more rare, in consequence of the heavens being colder]
  - Pliny the Elder. Naturalis Historia [The Natural History] (in Latin and English). Vol. VII. Translated by Bostock, John. 2 – via Perseus Digital Library.
  - Pliny the Elder. Naturalis Historia [The Natural History] (in Latin and English). Vol. XXIX. Translated by Bostock, John. 14 – via Perseus Digital Library.
- Pokorny, Julius (1959). Indogermanisches etymologisches Wörterbuch [Indo-European Etymological Dictionary] (in German). Francke. 686.
- Puttin, Lucio (1977). Monte Summano: Storia, arte, e tradizioni (in Italian). Schio.
- Richardson, Emeline Hurd Hill (1976) [1964]. The Etruscans: Their Art and Civilization. Chicago: University of Chicago Press. p. 164. ISBN 978-0-226-71235-2.
- Rissanen, Mika (2013) [2012]. "The Hirpi Sorani and the Wolf Cults of Central Italy". Arctos: Acta Philologica Fennica. 46. Helsinki: Klassillis-filologinen yhdistys: 115–135. doi:10.71390/arctos.85100. ISSN 0570-734X – via Academia.edu.
- Rix, Helmut (1991). Etruskische Texte (in German). Tübingen: Gunter Narr Verlag.
- Rovin, Jeff (1990). The Encyclopedia of Monsters. Facts On File. p. 50: , . ISBN 978-0-8160-1824-6.
- Scarborough, John (1969). Roman Medicine. Cornell University Press. pp. 144, 238. ISBN 978-0-8014-0525-9. "Vediovis"
- Scheid, John (2007). "Sacrifices for Gods and Ancestors". A Companion to Roman Religion. Blackwell: 264.
- Servius (380). Commentary on the Aeneid of Vergil (in Latin and English). Georgius Thilo – via Perseus Digital Library.
  - Servius (380a). Commentary on the Aeneid of Vergil (in Latin and English). Vol. X. 199 – via Perseus Digital Library.
  - Servius (380b). Commentary on the Aeneid of Vergil (in Latin and English). Vol. XI. 785 – via Perseus Digital Library.
- Silius Italicus (1905) [c. 90]. Summers, Walter Coventry [in Dutch]; Postgate, John Percival (eds.). Punica (in Latin). Vol. V. London. 175 – via Perseus Digital Library.
- Simek, Rudolf (1993). Dictionary of Northern Mythology. Translated by Hall, Angela. D.S. Brewer. ISBN 978-0-85991-513-7.
- "Soranus". Myth Index. Archived from the original on 21 September 2017.
- Strabo. Geography. Vol. V – via Perseus Digital Library.
- Sturluson, Snorri (c. 1220). "Gylfaginning". Prose Edda (in Old Norse).
  - Sturluson, Snorri (6 April 1995) [1987]. Edda. Translated by Faulkes, Anthony [in French]. London: Dent. ISBN 978-0-460-87616-2.
  - Sturluson, Snorri (2005). The Prose Edda. Penguin Classics. Translated by Byock, Jesse L. Penguin Books. ISBN 978-0-14-044755-2.
- Terpening, Ronnie Harold (1984). Charon and the Crossing: Ancient, Medieval, and Renaissance Transformations of a Myth. Lewisburg: Bucknell University Press. p. 15.
- The New Encyclopædia Britannica. Vol. 10. Encyclopædia Britannica. 1974. ISBN 978-0-85229-290-7. "Vediovis"
- Tilton, Theodore (1897). The complete poetical works of Theodore Tilton in one volume. London: T. Fisher Unwin. p. 705.
- Van der Meer, Lammert Bouke (2013). "The Lead Plaque of Magliano". Interpretando l'antico. Scritti di archeologia offerti a Maria Bonghi Jovino. Quaderni di Acme (134). Milan. pp. 323–341 (335) – via Academia.edu.
- Van der Meer, Lammert Bouke (2015) [2014]. "Some comments on the Tabula Capuana". Studi Etruschi. 77 (149–175). Rome: Giorgio Bretschneider. ISSN 0391-7762.
- Varro, Marcus Terentius. De lingua latina [On the Latin Language] (in Latin). Vol. V. 74.
- "Vediove". Nova Roma. Calendar of Holidays and Festivals.
- Vigfússon, Guðbrandur; Powell, Frederick York (1883). Corpus Poeticum Boreale: Court poetry. Vol. II. Oxford: Clarendon Press. p. 471.
- Virgil. Aeneid. Vol. XI. 786 – via Perseus Digital Library.
- Vollmer, Carl Gottfried Wilhelm [in Esperanto] (1874). Wörterbuch der Mythologie (in German). Stuttgart: Hoffmann'sche Verlagsbuchhandlung.
- VV.AA. (2023) [1992]. "Śuri". Gli Etruschi e l'Europa (in Italian). Fabbri & Bompiani. pp. 317–319. ISBN 978-88-450-4555-4.
- Woodard, Roger D. (2006). Indo-European Sacred Space: Vedic and Roman Cult. University of Illinois Press. pp. 116–117.
- Zavaroni, Adolfo (1996). I documenti etruschi (in Italian). Sherpa. "Calu"
