= Manth =

Etruscan underworld deity

Manth (Etruscan: 𐌌𐌀𐌍𐌈, romanized: Manth), latinized as Mantus, is an epithet of the Etruscan chthonic fire god Śuri as god of the underworld; this name was primarily used in the Po Valley, as described by Servius, but a dedication to the god manθ from the Archaic period was found in a sanctuary in Pontecagnano, Southern Italy. His name is thought to be the origin of Mantua (Italian: Mantova), the birthplace of Virgil.

Elsewhere in Etruria, the god was called Śuri, latinized as Soranus, a cross-cultural deity associated with the underworld.

== Consort ==
When paired with the epithet Mantus, his consort Catha (Etruscan: 𐌂𐌀𐌈𐌀) was also called Mania (Etruscan: 𐌌𐌀𐌍𐌉𐌀); she was a goddess of the dead, spirits and chaos: she was said to be the mother of ghosts, the undead, and other spirits of the night, as well as the Lares and the Manes. She, along with Mantus, ruled the underworld.

The epithets of this divine couple indicate that they were connected to the Manes, chthonic divinities or spirits of the dead in ancient Roman belief and called man(im) by the Etruscans.

Their names are also linked to Mana Genita and Manius, as well as the Greek Mania (or Maniae), goddess of insanity and madness. Both the Greek and Latin Mania derive from PIE (Proto-Indo-European) *men-, "to think." Cognates include Ancient Greek μένος, ménos, 'mind, thought', and Avestan 𐬎𐬫𐬥𐬌𐬀𐬨, mainyu, 'spirit'.
