= Usil =

Etruscan god of the sun

- God of the Sun
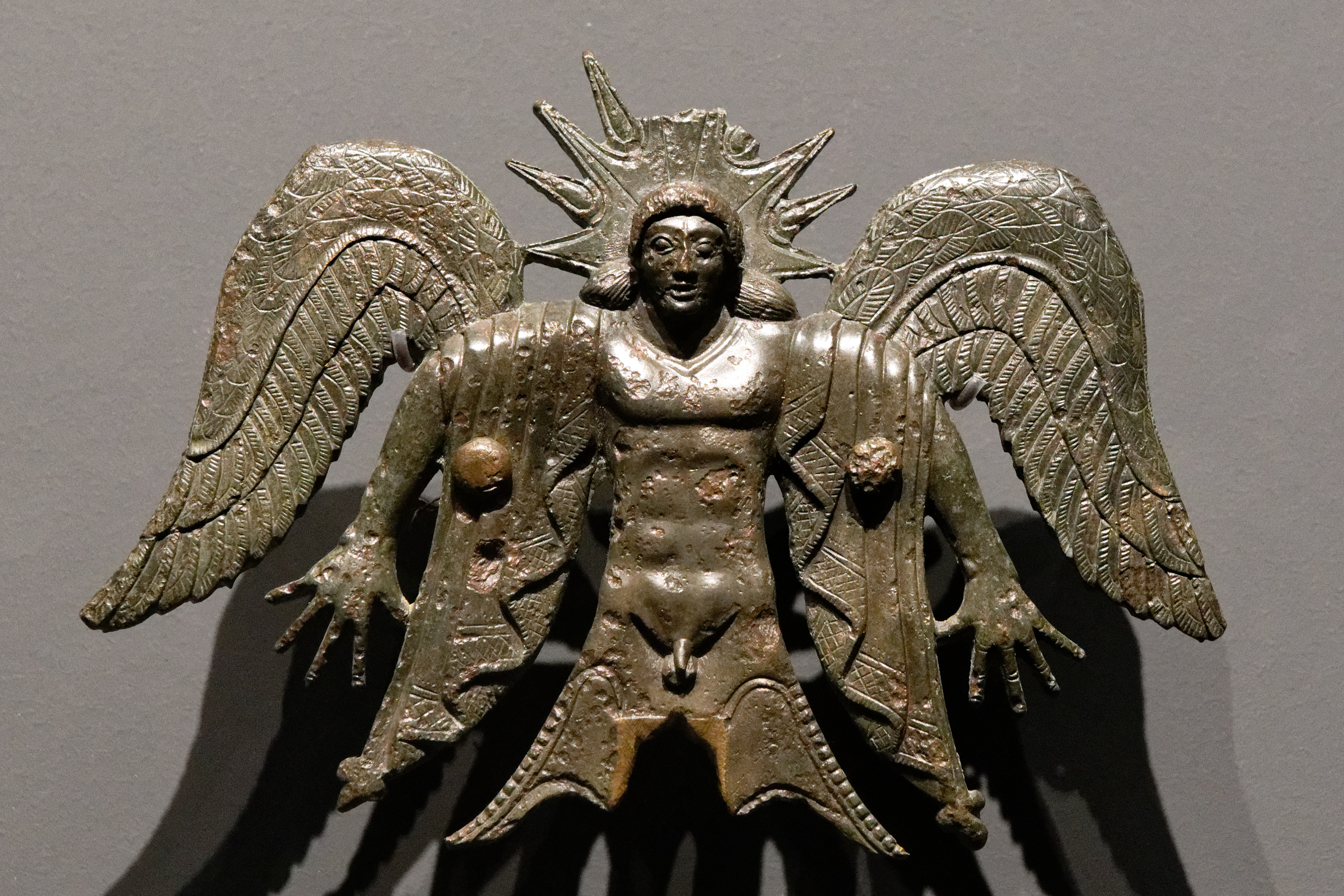
- Bronze funerary chariot fitting depicting Usil with a halo and wings (c. 500-475 BCE)
- Venerated in: Etruria
- Symbols: Halo, wings

Equivalents
- Greek: Helios
- Roman: Sol

In ancient Etruscan religion, Usil was the god of the sun. After the Etruscans were defeated by the Romans and assimilated into the Roman Empire, Usil was identified with the Roman sun god Sol. While the deity was typically portrayed as a male, there are also a number of female depictions.

== Role ==
Usil first appeared in Etruscan art in the late 6th century BCE, although he undoubtedly existed prior to this period. Etruscan artists rarely depicted celestial objects like the sun, so Usil and other celestial deities only began to appear in art after the influence of Greek mythology and culture on Etruscan society. Usil was the equivalent of the Greek sun god Helios.

Usil is mentioned in the Liber Linteus (c. 3rd century BCE) and Tabula Capuana (c. 470 BCE). These two Etruscan texts potentially served as ritual calendars: detailing yearly festivals and worship practices. However, Usil is not named in any surviving votive offerings. Therefore, his exact role, significance, and methods of worship are unknown.

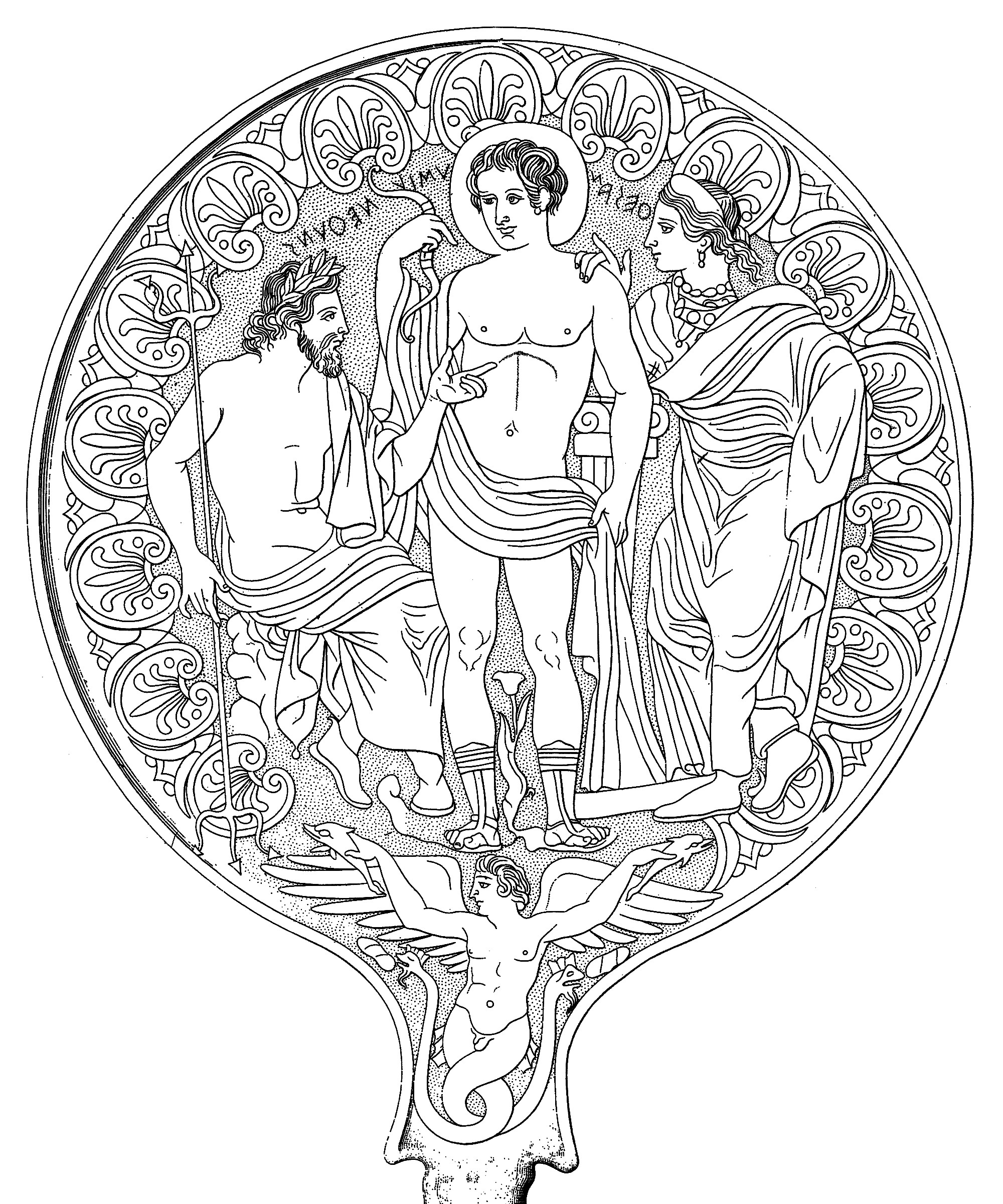
Bronze mirror from Tuscania (c. 350 BCE). Usil stands in the center, flanked by the water god Nethuns on his left, and the dawn goddess Thesan on his right.

Usil was associated with the Etruscan dawn goddess Thesan, and the pair were frequently pictured together, sometimes in a chariot. He may have also been connected to the goddess Catha, who was sometimes referred to as "Daughter of the Sun" (Solis Filia) and "Eye of the Sun." This may mean that Catha was Usil's daughter; however, scholars are not in agreement about the nature of the pair's relationship.

=== Liver of Piacenza ===
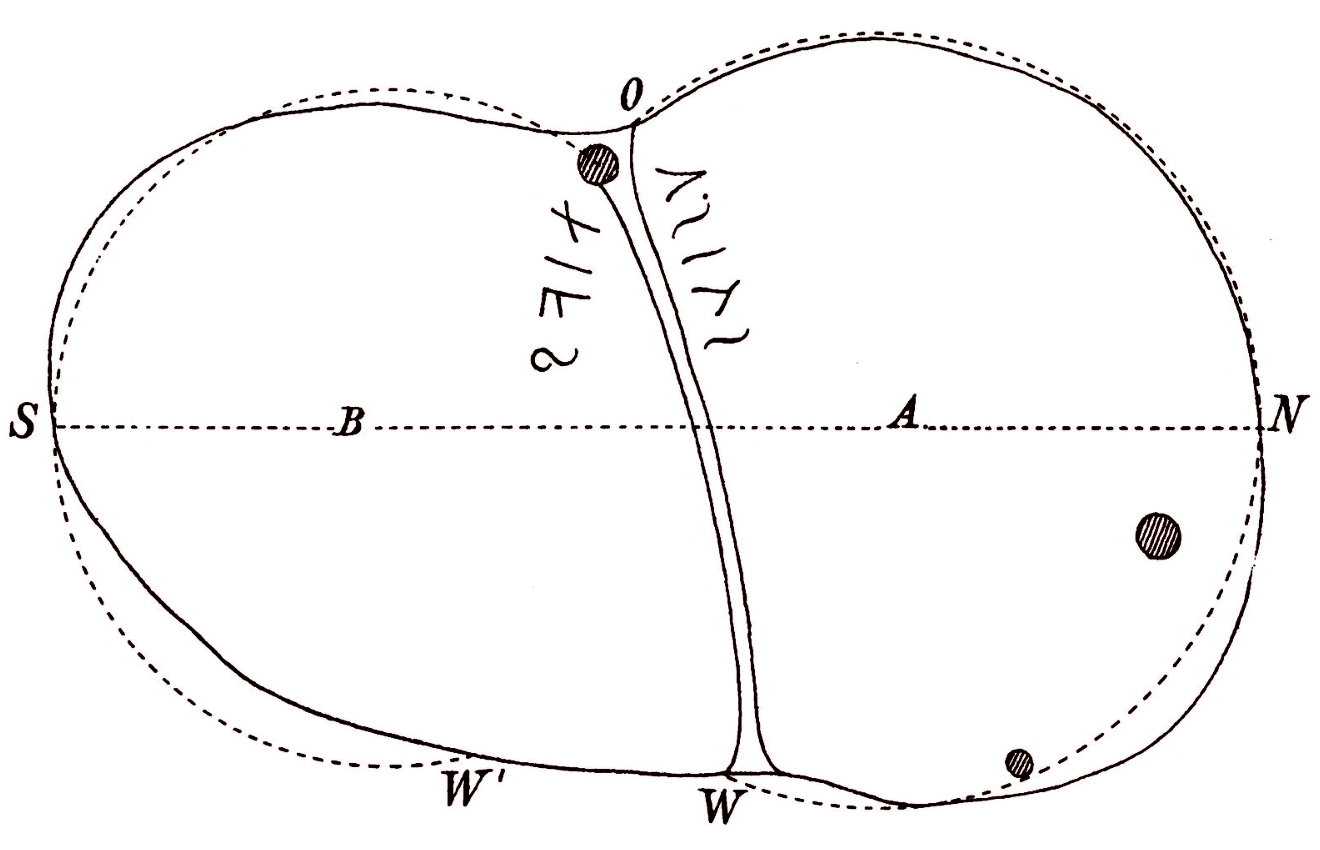
Diagram depicting the underside of the Liver of Piacenza. Usil's name can be seen on the right (northern) half of the object.

Usil's name appears on the Liver of Piacenza (c. 2nd century BCE), a bronze model of a sheep's liver depicting the Etruscan heavens. The object was possibly used in haruspicy, a form of divination. The object is inscribed with the names of 27 deities. Usil's appears on the convex underside of the object, next to the name Tiur ("moon"). Tiur was likely a moon goddess, and her name was also used as the Etruscan word for "month." The two gods' names split the 16 heavenly realm into two divisions: that of usils ("of the sun") and tivs ("of the moon").

== Imagery ==
Usil began appearing in Etruscan art starting in the late 6th century BCE. The Etruscans were expert bronze-workers, and many bronze sculptures and mirror engravings depicting Usil survive. The god was usually pictured as a young man— nude from the waist or groin up— with wings, a mantle, and halo or radiate crown. Some images showed him rising from the sea and holding a ball of fire. Usil appliqués were typically associated with the burial ceremonies of Etruria's elites; the objects were typically fastened to burial chariots used in funerary processions.

== See also ==
- List of solar deities
- Catha
- Etruscan Religion
