= Aita =

Etruscan underworld deity

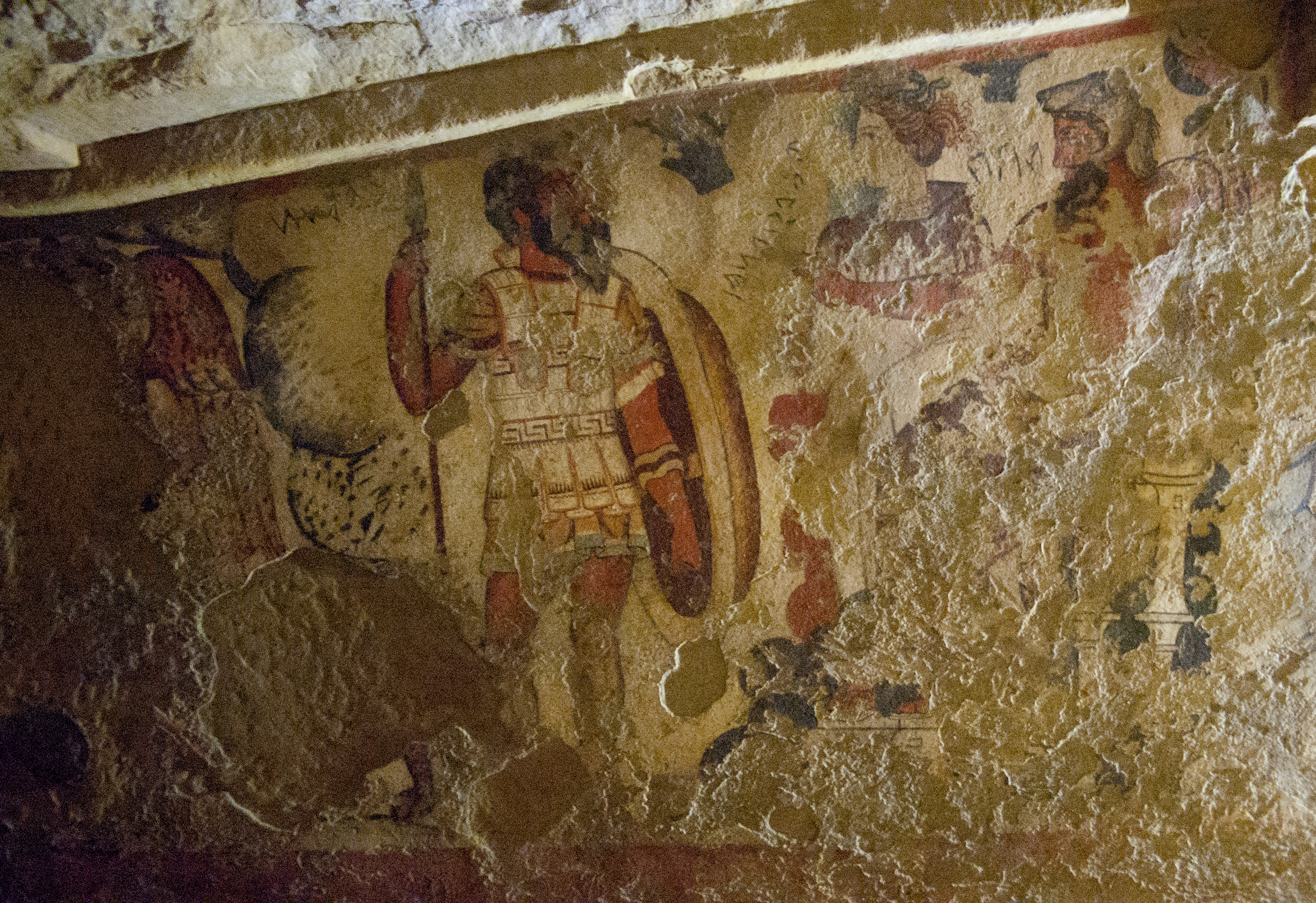
Fresco of Hades ("Aita", right) and Persephone ("Φersipnei", middle) leading a procession. Tomb of Orcus II, Tarquinia

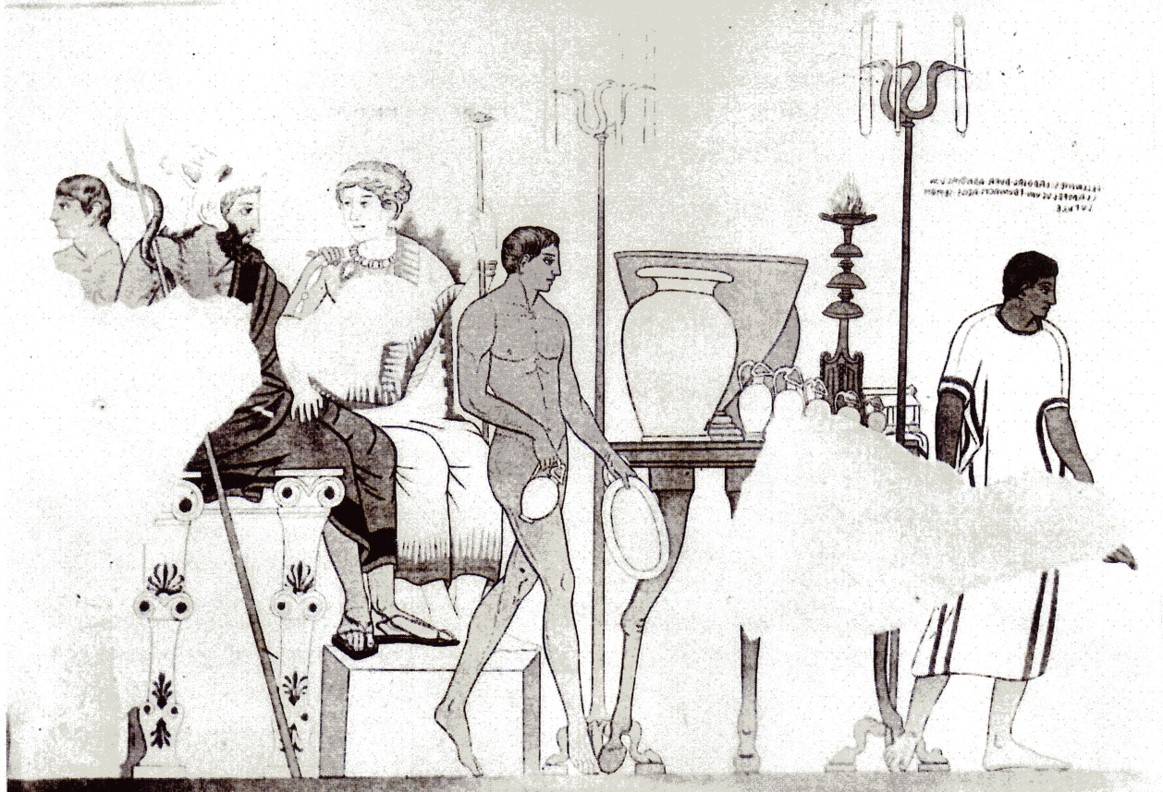
Tomba Golini, Orvieto

Aita (Etruscan: 𐌀𐌉𐌕𐌀), also spelled Eita (Etruscan: 𐌄𐌉𐌕𐌀), is an epithet of the Etruscan chthonic fire god Śuri as god of the underworld, roughly equivalent to the Greek god Hades (Epic Greek: Ἄϊδης, romanized: Áïdēs).

== Images ==
Aita is a relatively late addition to the Etruscan pantheon, appearing in iconography and in Etruscan texts beginning in the 4th century BC, and is heavily influenced by his Greek counterpart, Hades. Aita is pictured in only a few instances in Etruscan tomb painting, such as in the Golini Tomb from Orvieto and the tomb of Orcus II from Tarquinia. In these tomb paintings, he is shown with his consort Persipnei (Etruscan: 𐌐𐌄𐌛𐌔𐌉𐌐𐌍𐌄𐌉), also spelled Phersipnai (Etruscan: 𐌘𐌄𐌛𐌔𐌉𐌐𐌍𐌀𐌉), the Etruscan equivalent of the Greek Persephone.

Although Aita is very rarely depicted, he may appear enthroned and sometimes wears a wolf cap, borrowing a key attribute from the earlier Etruscan underworld wolf deity, named Calu. Other examples of Aita in Etruscan art depict his abduction of Persipnei. Aside from tomb painting, Aita may be identified in a few examples in other media, including a 4th-century painted vase from Vulci, two 2nd-century alabaster ash urns from Volterra, and a red-figure 4th–3rd century Oinochoe.

== Bibliography ==
- De Grummond, Nancy Thomson (2004). "For the Mother and for the Daughter: Some Thoughts on Dedications from Etruria and Praeneste". Hesperia Supplements. 33. The American School of Classical Studies at Athens: 351–370. ISBN 9780876615331. JSTOR 1354077.
- De Grummond, Nancy Thomson (2006). Etruscan Myth, Sacred History, and Legend. Philadelphia, PA: University of Pennsylvania Museum of Archaeology and Anthropology. ISBN 9781931707862.
- De Grummond, Nancy Thomson; Simon, Erika, eds. (2006). The Religion of the Etruscans. Austin: University of Texas Press. ISBN 9780292782334.
  - Bonfante, Larissa. "Etruscan Inscriptions and Etruscan Religion". In De Grummond & Simon (2006).
  - Colonna, Giovanni. "Sacred Architecture and the Religion of the Etruscans". In De Grummond & Simon (2006).
  - Krauskopf, Ingrid. "The Grave and Beyond". In De Grummond & Simon (2006), p. vii, pp. 73–75.
  - Simon, Erika. "Gods in Harmony: The Etruscan Pantheon". In De Grummond & Simon (2006).
- Elliott, John (1995-01-01). "The Etruscan Wolfman in Myth and Ritual". Etruscan Studies. 2 (1): 17–33. doi:10.1515/etst.1995.2.1.17. S2CID 194102662.
- Jannot, Jean-René (2005). Religion in Ancient Etruria. Translated by Whitehead, J.K. University of Wisconsin Press. ISBN 9780299208448.
- Lecce, Vittoria. "Novembre e il dio Suri - Il Nero Signore" (in Italian). Museo Nazionale Etrusco.
- Lexicon Iconographicum Mythologiae Classicae. Vol. I–VIII. Zurich, Munich, Düsseldorf: Artemis & Winkler Verlag. 1981–1999. ISBN 3-7608-8751-1.
  - Krauskopf, Ingrid (1988). "Aita/Calu". In LIMC. Vol. IV. pp. 394–399.
- Maras, Daniele F. (2010). "Suri. Il nero signore degli inferi". Archeo (in Italian). No. 305. Archived from the original on 2014-12-10.
- Servius (380). Commentary on the Aeneid of Vergil (in Latin). Vol. I–XII. Georgius Thilo – via Perseus Digital Library.
  - Servius (380a). Commentary on the Aeneid of Vergil (in Latin). Vol. X. 199 – via Perseus Digital Library.
  - Servius (380b). Commentary on the Aeneid of Vergil (in Latin). Vol. XI. 785 – via Perseus Digital Library.
