= Calu =

Epithet of the Etruscan god Śuri

Calu (Etruscan: 𐌂𐌀𐌋𐌖, romanized: Calu, lit. 'dark, darkness') is an epithet of the Etruscan chthonic fire god Śuri as god of the underworld, roughly equivalent to the Greek god Hades (Epic Greek: Ἄϊδης, romanized: Áïdēs; Etruscan: 𐌀𐌉𐌕𐌀, romanized: Aita); moreover, as with Hades, this god-name was also used as a synonym for the underworld itself.

He is identified by his wolf attributes, such as a wolf-like appearance or a human with a wolf-skin cap. The visual representations of the cult of Calu seem to contain common elements with the Roman cult of Lupercalia and the Faliscan cult of the Hirpi Sorani ("wolves of Soranus", from Sabine: hirpus, lit. 'wolf').

== Bibliography ==
- De Grummond, Nancy Thomson; Simon, Erika, eds. (2006). The Religion of the Etruscans. Austin: University of Texas Press. ISBN 9780292782334.
  - Bonfante, Larissa. "Etruscan Inscriptions and Etruscan Religion". In De Grummond & Simon (2006).
  - Colonna, Giovanni. "Sacred Architecture and the Religion of the Etruscans". In De Grummond & Simon (2006).
  - Krauskopf, Ingrid. "The Grave and Beyond". In De Grummond & Simon (2006), p. vii, pp. 73–75.
  - Simon, Erika. "Gods in Harmony: The Etruscan Pantheon". In De Grummond & Simon (2006).
- Maras, Daniele F. (2010). "Suri. Il nero signore degli inferi". Archeo (in Italian). No. 305. Archived from the original on 2014-12-10.
- Mc Callister, Rick; Mc Callister, Silvia, eds. (1999), "CA-CE", Etruscan Glossary, "Calu"
- Rissanen, Mika (2013) [2012]. "The Hirpi Sorani and the Wolf Cults of Central Italy". Arctos: Acta Philologica Fennica. 46. Helsinki: Klassillis-filologinen yhdistys. ISSN 0570-734X – via Academia.edu.
- Bouke van der Meer, Lammert (2013). "Lead Plaque of Magliano". Interpretando l'antico. Scritti di archeologia offerti a Maria Bonghi Jovino. Quaderni di Acme (134). Milan. pp. 323–341 (335) – via Academia.edu.
- Zavaroni, Adolfo (1996). I documenti etruschi (in Italian). Sherpa. "Calu"
