= Monte Summano =

Mountain in Italy

Coordinates: 45°45′35″N 11°23′24″E

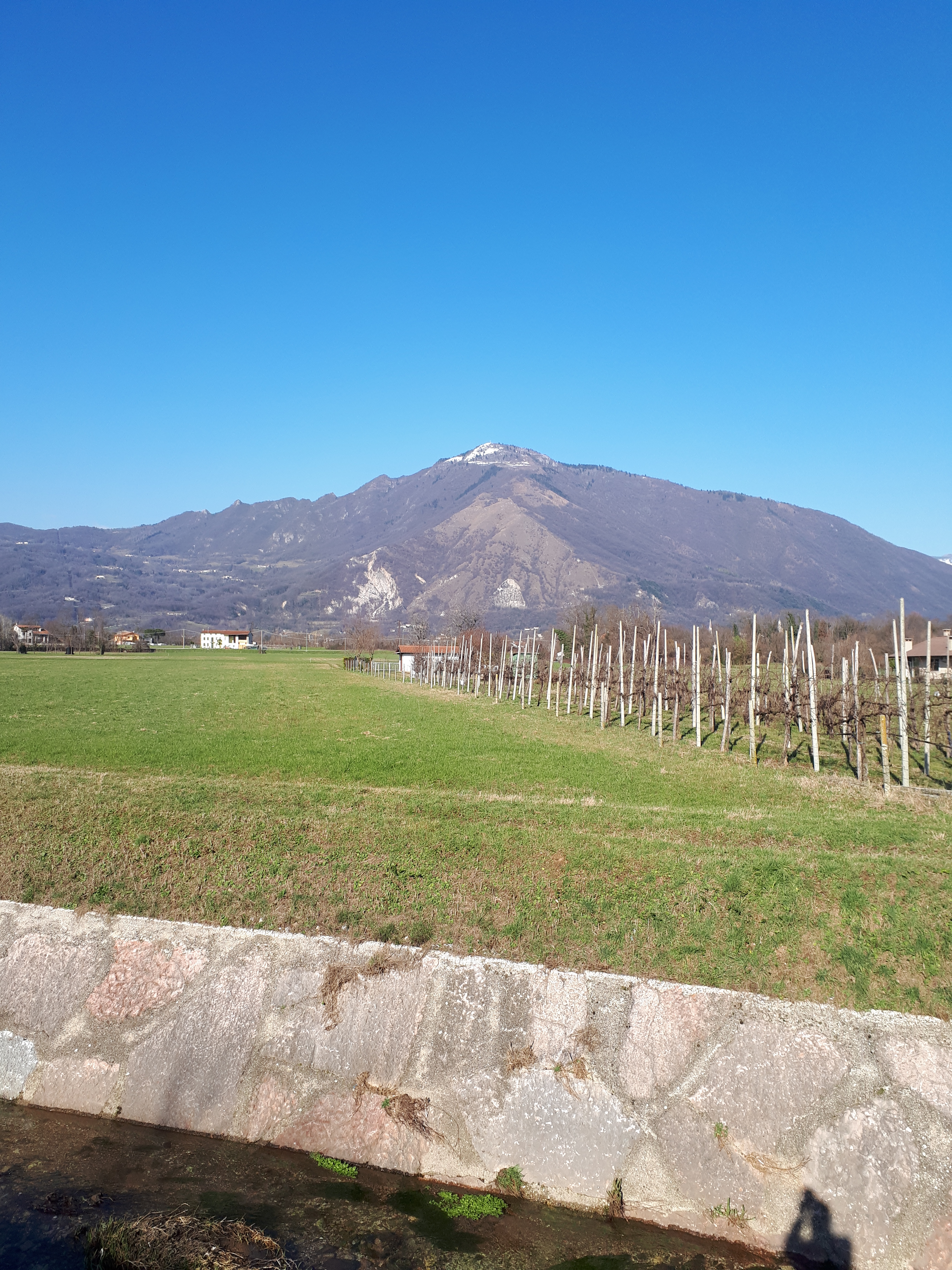

Highest point
- Elevation: 1,296 m (4,252 ft)

Geography
- Location: Veneto, Italy

Monte Summano is a mountain in the Veneto region, Italy. It has an elevation of 1,296 metres. From ancient times it was a spiritual place, and a metal cross of Jesus with a trail was built in 1892 to the top of the mountain.
