= Persipnei =

Etruscan deity

Phersipnai
- Queen of the underworld
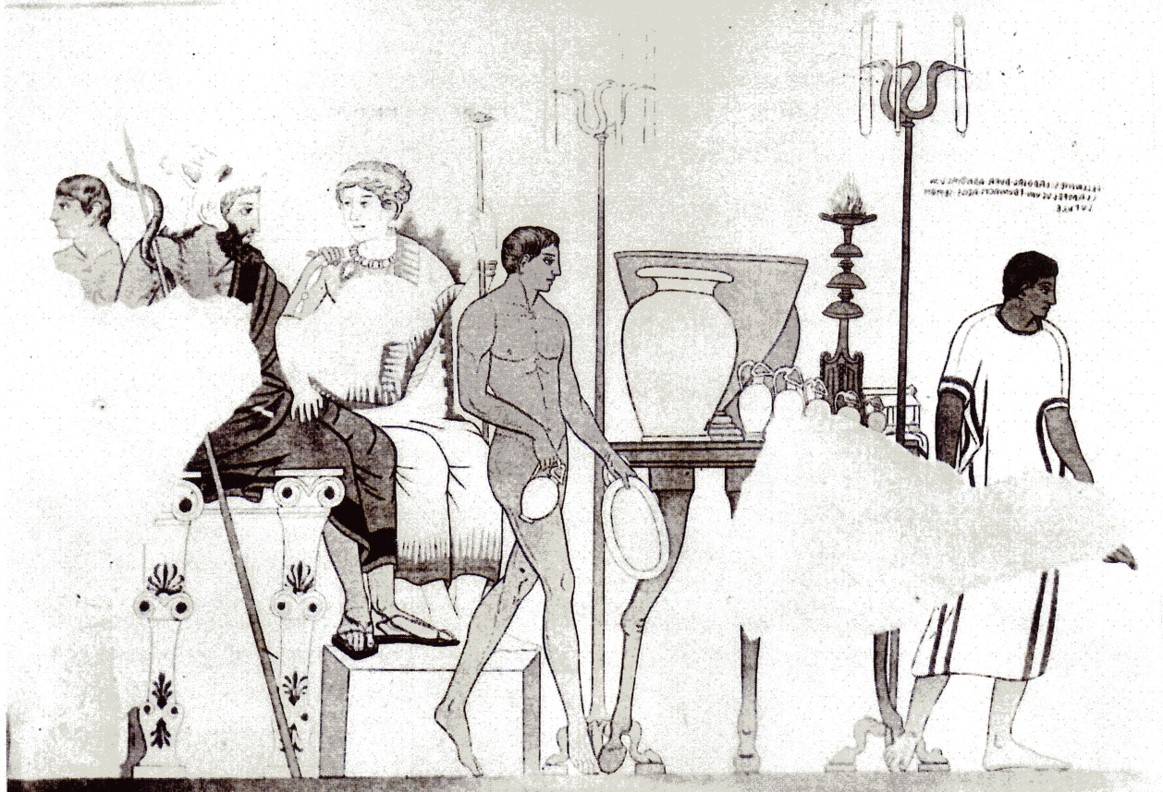
- Aita and Phersipnei (second and third from left) presiding over the underworld
- Etruscan: 𐌘𐌄𐌓𐌔𐌉𐌐𐌍𐌄𐌉
- Consort: Aita

Equivalents
- Greek: Persephone
- Roman: Proserpina

In Etruscan mythology, Persipnei or Phersipnai (later Ferspnai) was the queen of the underworld and equivalent to the Greek goddess Persephone and Roman Proserpina. Persipnei was the consort of the divine ruler of the underworld, Aita. Together, both of these deities ruled the Etruscan underworld, which was guarded by Mantus and Mania. Indeed, her name was borrowed by the Etruscans from the Greeks.

She is not depicted often, but when shown she is usually alongside her husband Aita in tomb frescos. One of the frescos in the Tomb of Orcus shows her with snakes in her hair, similar to Medusa.

== See also ==
- Etruscan civilization
