= Wilhelm Engelhard =

German sculptor and painter

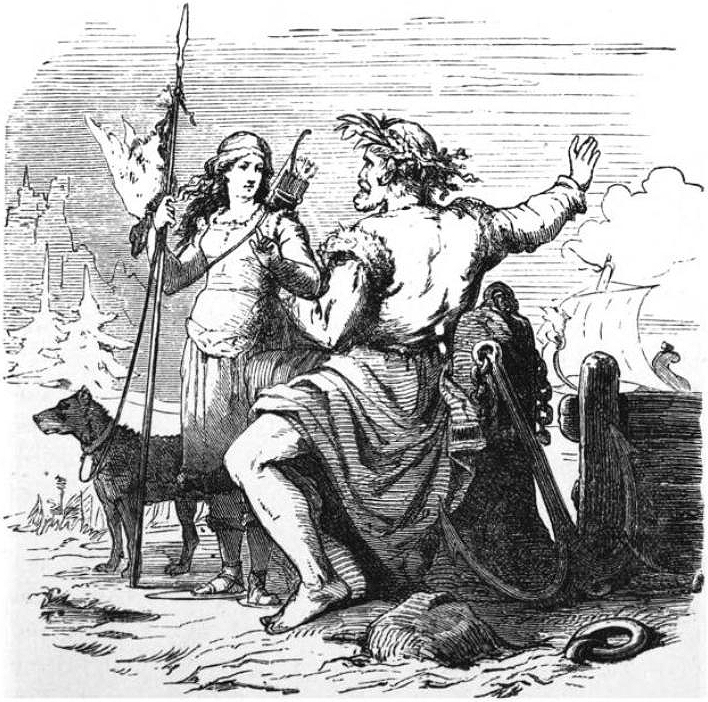
Njörðr and Skaði on the way to Njörðr's home, Nóatún

Friedrich Wilhelm Engelhard (19 September 1813 – 22 January 1902) was a German sculptor and painter.

== Biography ==
He was born in Grünhagen (near Bienenbüttel, Prussia). He studied at Hanover, at Copenhagen with Thorwaldsen and at Munich with Schwanthaler.

== Works ==
He executed many groups, single figures and genre pieces. His chief work was a frieze on the Edda. This was executed in 1857 in the Marienburg Palace at the request of George V, King of Hanover. It is a colossal work dealing with the main features of the saga and rich in grand sculptural effects.

Among Engelhard's other creations are “Love on a Swan,” “Dancing Springtime,” “Slinger with Dog,” “Bacchus Conquering a Panther,” “Cupid and Psyche,” “A Child Fishing,” “A Child Threading a Needle,” statue of St. Michael, portrait medallion of Bismarck (for the monument of Canossa, near Harzberg), “Christ Blessing Little Children,” and legendary characters of Germany: Odin, Thor, and the Valkyries.
