= Roy and Lesley Adkins =

English writer

Roy Arthur Adkins FSA (born 1951) and Lesley Adkins FSA (born 1955) are English writers and archaeologists. They are members of the Institute for Archaeologists and fellows of the Society of Antiquaries of London. They have both written several books.

Based in Devon, near Exeter, they devote much of their time to writing. Their first book was A Thesaurus of British Archaeology, better known by its paperback title of The Handbook of British Archaeology. They have written several other books on archaeological and historical themes, from detailed reference books to popular non-fiction. The latter includes The Keys of Egypt, an account of Champollion's successful deciphering of ancient Egyptian hieroglyphs. They have also pursued individual writing projects – Lesley wrote Empires of the Plain: Henry Rawlinson and the Lost Languages of Babylon, and Roy wrote Trafalgar: The Biography of a Battle (US title Nelson's Trafalgar).

== Biography ==
Roy was born and raised in Maidenhead, Berkshire, He was educated at University College, Cardiff, gaining a Bachelor of Arts degree in archaeology whilst spending vacations on digs mainly at the Roman town of Usk in south Wales. After obtaining his degree, he worked as a field archaeologist in Milton Keynes, and later at a Roman villa site at Beddington near Croydon with Lesley.

Lesley was born in 1955 in Eastbourne. She obtained degrees in archaeology, ancient history, and Latin at the University of Bristol, and her Master of Philosophy degree at the University of Surrey. After graduating she worked as an assistant archaeologist on excavations in Milton Keynes before meeting Roy and moving to South London.

They married in 1978.

They both worked as field archaeologists for the Museum of London and later became freelance archaeological consultants, authors, and editors. After 2000 they moved to Devon and began to write full-time.

== Work ==
As co-writers:

- Jack Tar: Life in Nelson's Navy
- The War for All the Oceans: From Nelson at the Nile to Napoleon at Waterloo
- The Keys of Egypt: The Race to Read the Hieroglyphs
- The Handbook of British Archaeology
- Handbook to Life in Ancient Rome
- Handbook to Life in Ancient Greece
- The Little Book of Egyptian Hieroglyphs
- Dictionary of Roman Religion
- Introduction to the Romans
- A Field Guide to Somerset Archaeology
- Talking Archaeology: A Handbook for Lecturers and Organisers
- Abandoned Places
- An Introduction to Archaeology
- Archaeological Illustration
- Under the Sludge. Beddington Roman Villa
- Jane Austen's England
- When There Were Birds

Lesley Adkins:

- Empires of the Plain: Henry Rawlinson and the Lost Languages of Babylon

Roy Adkins:

- Trafalgar: The Biography of a Battle

== Reception ==
A review in Navy News stated that "Roy and Lesley Adkins possess that rare knack among historians: merging the academic with the narrative and providing a riveting read which also casts light where it is dark."

== Popular culture ==
In 2010, Trafalgar: The Biography of a Battle made an appearance at Christmas in the comedy programme Peep Show (series 7 episode 5), when Mark (played by David Mitchell) receives a copy of the book as a present from his flatmate Jeremy (played by Robert Webb). "I heard you talking about it", comments Jeremy, to which Mark replies, "That's just tremendously thoughtful Jeremy".
