= Sethlans =

God in Etruscan mythology

- God of Fire and Craftsmanship
- Other names: Veltha
- Weapon: Hammer
- Artifacts: Tongs, Tools
- Symbol: Pileus
- Ethnic group: Etruscan

Equivalents
- Greek: Hephaestus
- Roman: Vulcan
- Egyptian: Ptah

In Etruscan mythology, Sethlans was the god of fire, the forge, metalworking, and by extension craftsmanship in general, the equivalent, though their names share no etymology, to Greek Hephaestus, Egyptian Ptah and the Roman Vulcan. Sethlans is one of the indigenous Etruscan gods. In Etruscan arts Sethlans may be identified by his tools, the hammer and tongs of the blacksmith, and by the pileus or conical cap he wears.

His association with order and technical skill made him essential to rituals involving material production, such as weapon or tool creation, reflecting the Etruscan reverence for divine precision and manual labor.

By what appears to be a curious omission, his name does not appear on the bronze liver of Piacenza.

== Archaeological Evidence ==
The direct archaeological evidence of Sethlans is relatively scarce compared to other deities. However, he is represented on several engraved Etruscan bronze mirrors, where he is shown working at his forge or participating in divine scenes involving other gods.

In one mirror, Sethlans is assisted by Dionysus (Fufluns), suggesting his integration into broader mythological narratives and the syncretic nature of Etruscan religious iconography. His presence in funerary and votive objects, as well as temple artifacts tied to craftsmanship and fire, signifies his ritual significance and the Etruscan belief in the divine oversight of metallurgy and transformation.

== See also ==
- Etruscan civilization
