= Thesan =

Etruscan dawn goddess

- Goddess of the dawn
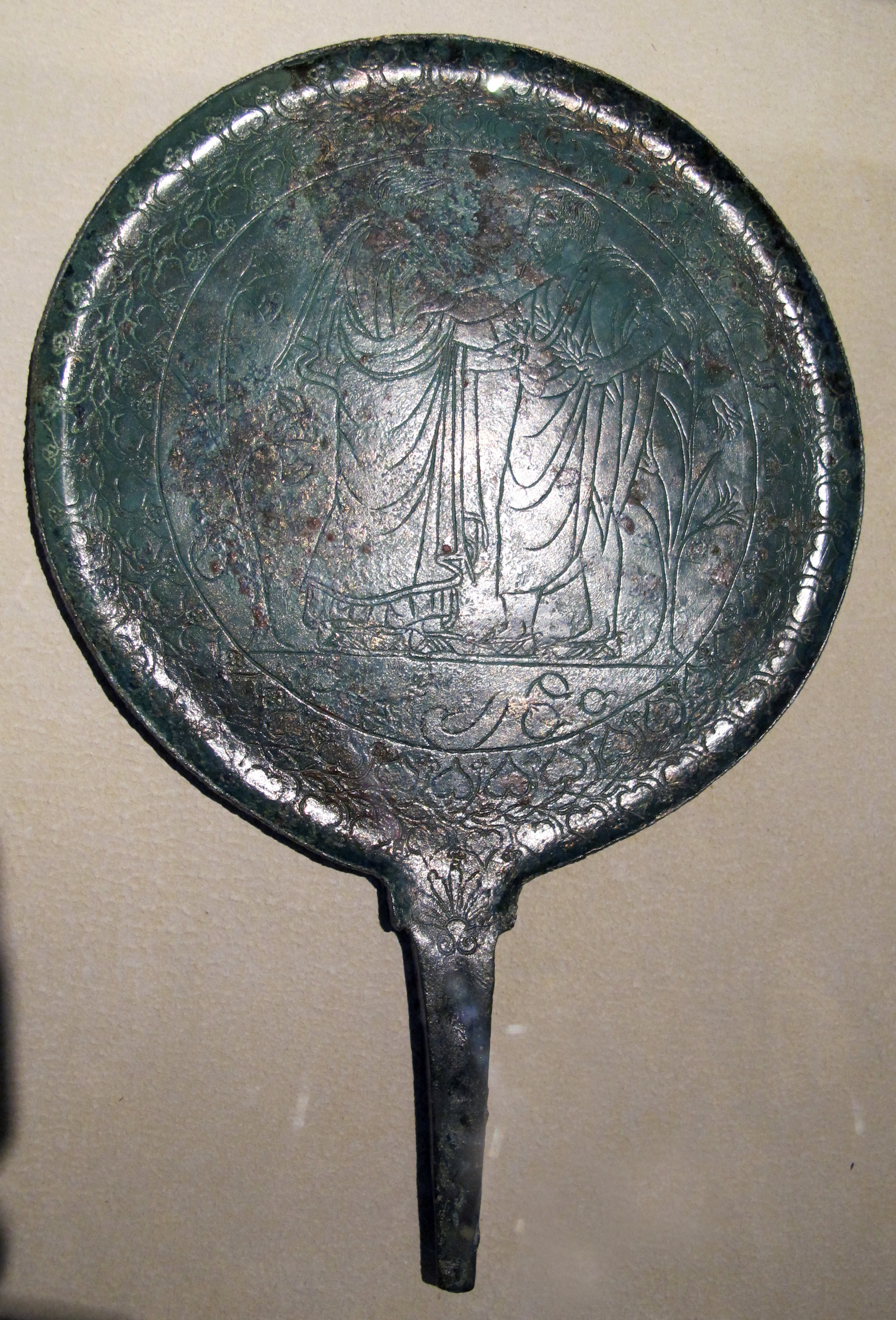
- An ancient Etruscan mirror from Perugia depicting Thesan (c. 3rd century BCE)

Equivalents
- Greek: Eos and Leucothea
- Roman: Aurora and Mater Matuta

In Etruscan religion and mythology, Thesan is the goddess of the dawn. In Etruria, she was worshipped at Caere's harbour of Pyrgi, where a temple was dedicated to her and a singular series of "daybreak antefixes" was excavated. She received offerings alongside the sun god Usil, as described in the Liber Linteus. In art, Thesan was typically depicted with wings, and sometimes in the nude.

Thesan's equivalent in Roman mythology may have been the goddess Aurora, and her equivalent in Greek mythology may have been Eos. However, other evidence points to her likeness being assimilated into the Greek sea goddess Leucothea and the Latin goddess Mater Matuta.

== Etymology ==
One proposed meaning of her name is simply "dawn"; related words are thesi, meaning "illumination", and thesviti, "clear or famous". The other meaning of her name potentially connects her with fortune-telling, as thesan also meant "divination", as seen in the related Etruscan word thesanthei, "divining", "illuminating", or "brilliant".

This etymological connection may relate to her function as a dawn goddess. Divination enables one to see the future— and, like the dawn— illuminates what was previously dark. She has also been described as a childbirth goddess, as she was present at the beginning of the day, which finds its parallel in the beginning of a new baby's life. This would make her functions similar to those of Juno Lucina, who brought the newborn into the light of day.

== Mythology ==
=== The Curse of Aphrodite ===
The Etruscans identified their Thesan with the Greek dawn goddess Eos. In the Greek legend, Aphrodite had found Eos in bed with her lover Ares; to punish Eos, Aphrodite "tormented with constant passion, and Eos became infamous for her many young lovers. The Etruscans seemed to quite like these stories and easily transferred them to their dawn goddess Thesan; the stories depicted on the mirrors are generally straight out of Greek myth. Thesan, the goddess of the dawn, “,” is depicted abducting a younger mortal on several engraved Etruscan mirrors dated from 530 to 450 B.C., w

== In art ==
=== With her chariot ===
The upper exergue has Thesan (Eos), the goddess of dawn, in her quadriga, a four-horse chariot. Asset number 812745001

=== With Cephalus ===
A common representation of Thesan is carrying off Kephalos. The handsome hunter is the son of Hermes. Eos is often depicted carrying or embracing Kephalos before returning him to his wife, Prokris, in Athens.

The motif of Thesan and her lover can be found on Etruscan mirrors, pottery, and tomb frescoes.

In one mirror depiction from 480-470 BCE at the Museo Gregoriano Etrusco Thesan is running off with Kephalos. Winged and with a nimbus, Thesan is depicted running or in flight with Kephalos in her arms after having kidnapped him. This is probably the first version of the myth according to which Thesan falls in love with the young hunter hero, son of Hermes and Herse, who then becomes Thesan's husband. This mirror is from Vulci, from the excavations of Luciano and Alexandrine Bonaparte, princes of Canino; acquired in 1840 Cat. 12241. According to the museum:

"Bronze workers from Vulci in the late archaic period were able to cast flawless mirrors with complex decorations, already using wax models rather than cold engraving. The very low relief is enriched with engraved calligraphic details; there were leaves inlaid with silver on the frame."

Another relief mirror from the British Museum is museum number 1865,0712.14, Thesan is shown in the act of abducting Cephalus, a young man of Athens who had been married to the King Erechtheus’ daughter, Procris. Thesan is winged here, wearing a chiton and diagonal himation that flows in the breeze; about her head is a halo, to emphasize her function as a goddess of light. She runs off to the left carrying Cephalus in her arms, who is shown as nude and much smaller than she is. He does not look at all distressed at the situation and he rests in her arms with his right hand on her shoulder. Like many depictions of Etruscan women and their lovers, she is shown as larger and therefore more important or powerful than the man: This has been taken as an indication of the high status of Etruscan women.

The same scene is depicted on a mirror handle in high relief openwork; Cephalus is again quite a lot smaller (and younger) than Thesan, who is not winged this time, but whose cloak billows behind her in the breeze. She smiles down at young Kephalos as She lifts him up, and he is nude save for a short cloak and hunting boots.

This same image is depicted in a in the British Museum Museum number 1847,0806.130

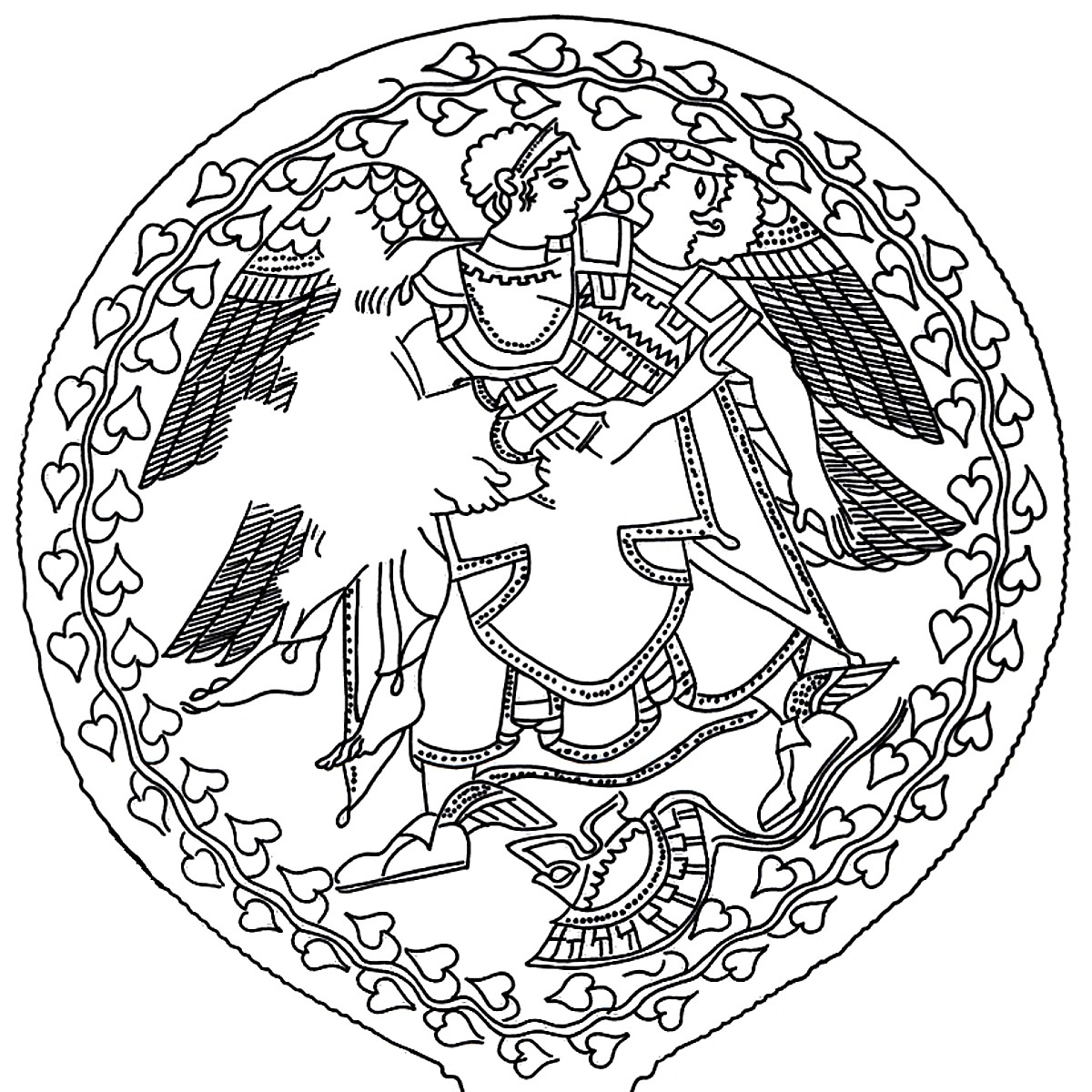
Thesan appears on a mirror in New York, rescuing her son Memnun from death at the hands of Achle. Title: Bronze mirror Period: Classical Date: ca. 450–420 BCE Culture: Etruscan Accession Number: 22.139.84

=== With Memnun ===
Another favorite scene of Thesan/Eos depicts a far more somber affair. Her son's Etruscan name is recorded as Memnum (Memrun) being the equivalent to the Greek Memnon. This son by Tithonus, another young man she abducted to be her lover, called Thinthun by the Etruscans and was killed in the Trojan War. Eos grieved so terribly that she threatened never to bring forth the dawn again. She was finally persuaded to return, but in Her grief she weeps tears of dew every morning for Her beloved son. One mirror-back shows Her before Tinia (Zeus) with Thethis (Thetis), the mother of Achle (Achilles). Both goddesses plead with Tinia to spare their sons' lives; but both were already doomed to die. This is known as the Memnon Pieta. The relief mirror mentioned (right) depicts Thesan carrying off the body of her dead son Memnun. Often in ancient art there are different interpretations as often figures were not labelled. However Etruscan mirrors with figures do have names engraved beside them.

=== With Tinia ===
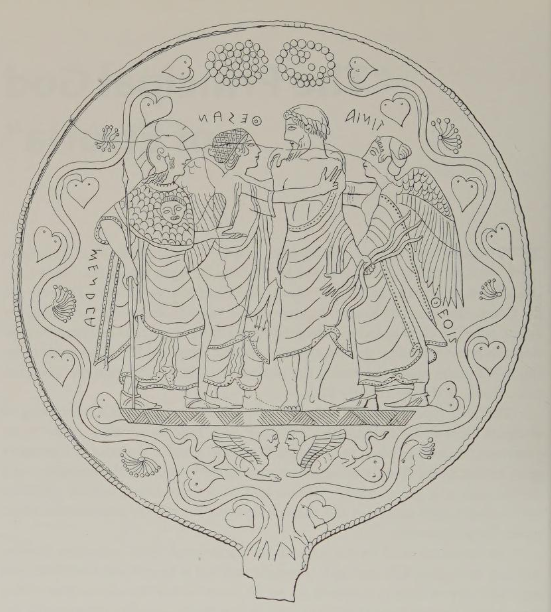
Bronze Mirror depicting Tinia, Thesan, Thethis, and Menrva. Potentially a representation of a dramatic performance "teaching" scene.

As with Greek art depictions, Thesan is depicted in bronze mirrors entreating upon Tinia along with Thethis (=Thetis) to spare the lives of their sons, Memnun and Achle respectively. The goddesses were him to affect the destiny of their sons in their battle against each other.

=== With Usil and Nethuns ===
The Liber Lintaeus connects Thesan with the Etruscan sun god Usil, equivalent to the Greek Helios and Roman Sol. She has her arm around Usil’s back, implying a connection that Helios and Eos do not have. A fourth century mirror now shows her in conversation with both Usil and Nethuns (Etruscan Neptune / Poseidon).

== See also ==
- Aurora
- Dawn goddess
- Eos
- Memnun
- Memnon
- Kephalos
- Etruscan civilization
- Etruscan religion
- Mater Matuta
- Usil
