= Vejovis =

Roman god eventually identified with healing

Vejovis or Vejove (Latin: Vēiovis or Vēdiovis; rare Vēive or Vēdius) was a Roman god of Etruscan origins (Etruscan: 𐌅𐌄𐌕𐌉𐌔, romanized: Vetis, or 𐌅𐌄𐌉𐌅𐌉𐌔, Veivis).

== Representation and worship ==
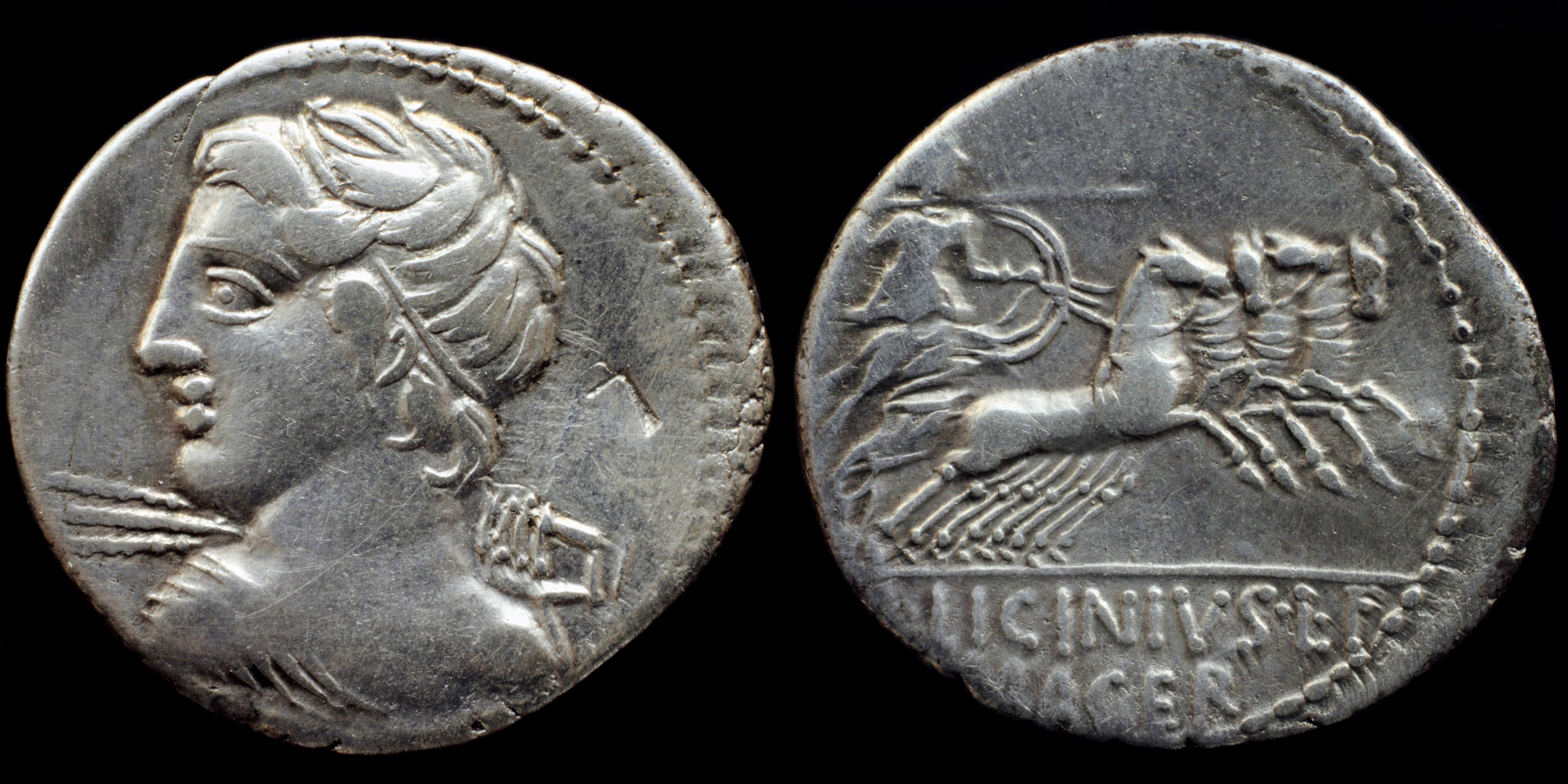

First side of the image: O: Diademed bust of Vejovis hurling thunderbolt
Second side of the image: R: Minerva with javelin and shield riding quadriga C·LICINIUS·L·F / MACER
Silver denarius struck in Rome 84 BC ref.: Licinia 16; sear5 #274; Cr354/1; Syd 732

Vejovis was portrayed as a young man, holding a bunch of arrows (or lightning bolts), or a pilum, in his hand, and accompanied by a goat. Romans believed that Vejovis was one of the first gods to be born. He was a god of healing, and became associated with the Greek Asclepius. He was mostly worshipped in Rome and Bovillae in Latium. On the Capitoline Hill and on the Tiber Island, temples were erected in his honour.

Though he was associated with volcanic eruptions, his original role and function is obscured to us. He is occasionally identified with Apollo and young Jupiter.

Aulus Gellius, in the Noctes Atticae, written around 177 CE, speculated that Vejovis was an ill-omened counterpart of Jupiter; compare Summanus. Aulus Gellius observes that the particle ve- that prefixes the name of the god also appears in Latin words such as vesanus, "insane," and thus interprets the name Vejovis as the anti-Jove.

=== Temple ===
He had a temple between the two peaks of the Capitoline Hill in Rome, where his statue carried a bundle of arrows and stood next to a statue of a she-goat.

=== Sacrifices ===
In spring, multiple goats were sacrificed to him to avert plagues. Gellius informs us that Vejovis received the sacrifice of a female goat, sacrificed ritu humano (lit. "by human rite"); this obscure phrase could possibly mean "after the manner of a human sacrifice" or "in the manner of a burial." These offerings were less about the animal sacrificed and more about the soul sacrificed.

== Festivals ==
Vejovis had three festivals in the Roman Calendar: on 1 January, 7 March, and 21 May.
