= Maniae =

Ancient Greek spirit of madness

Mania (far left, holding a whip), detail of a Paestan red-figure calyx krater by Asteas, c. 350–340 BC, National Archaeological Museum of Madrid

In Ancient Greek mythology, the Maniae or Maniai (Ancient Greek: Μανίαι, romanized: Maniai; sg. Μανία) are the spirit or spirits of madness. Later poets also used the singular form (Mania), considering her an independent personification of insanity, madness, and frenzied delusion, symbolizing various forms of mental disturbance such as hysteria, delirium, delusion, obsession, and possession. The Maniae are also associated with the Erinyes, the three fearsome goddesses of vengeance.

They are sometimes said—perhaps in jest, or as a metaphor for love’s often cruel and maddening nature—to have been the nurses of the god Eros.

Mania is mentioned in Iliad by Homer, as one of Ares' companions in war, alongside Lyssa (Rage) and Penthos (Grief).

== Etymology ==
The Greek noun μανία (manía) means “madness” or “going astray,” but also “inspiration” and “enthusiasm.” However, poets, when referring to the divine personification, invariably used the term with a negative connotation. They were invoked in ancient Greek rituals to avert or control madness, highlighting their dual role as both the causes and potential remedies for insanity.

== Mythology ==
Pausanias writes that on the road from Megalopolis to Messene there was a sanctuary, which, according to local citizens, was devoted to goddesses called Maniae, and that its surrounding district was also called Maniae (Μανίας). His local sources told him that it was there that madness overtook Orestes, hence Pausanias's view that these Maniae were the vengeful Furies or Erinyes or Eumenides (Graceful Ones).

Mania appears as one single distinct figure, not as Maniae, on the Paestan calyx krater signed by the painter Assteas (c. 350–320 BC, now in the National Archaeological Museum of Madrid). In the scene, inspired by the lost tragedy Heracles in Madness, Mania is wearing an ornate chiton, holds a whip, and watches as Heracles driven insane by Hera prepares to kill his own children.
