= Dawn deities =

Deity in a polytheistic religion

A dawn deity is a deity in a polytheistic religious tradition who is in some sense associated with the dawn. These deities show some relation with the morning, the beginning of the day, and, in some cases, become syncretized with similar solar deities.

== Africa ==
In Egyptian mythology, Tefnut, in part of her being goddess of the morning dew.

== Americas ==
In Sioux mythology, Anpao, the spirit of the dawn, has two faces.

== Asia ==
=== Japanese ===
- Ame-no-Uzume, goddess of dawn, mirth, meditation, revelry and the arts.

=== Indo-European ===
- Hindu-Vedic – Ushas is a prominent figure in the Rigvedic hymns. Representing the dawn, "she is said to rouse all life, to set all things in motion," and is commonly associated with cows.

=== Ugarit - Canaanite ===
- Shahar 𐎌𐎈𐎗, שחר. Mentioned in the Ugarit scriptures canon. Brother of Shallem - Dusk, and sun of El (head of the local pantheon). The term is still used as a personal name in the middle east: Hebrew, Persian, and Arabic.

=== Roman Syria and Galilee ===
- Lucifer and Jesus of The Bible are both referred to as the “morning star” since in ancient times, the morning star had been referred to as an entity of great power.

=== Philippines ===
- Munag Sumalâ: the golden Kapampangan serpent child of Aring Sinukuan; represents dawn
- Tala: the Tagalog goddess of stars; daughter of Bathala and sister of Hanan; also called Bulak Tala, deity of the morning star, the planet Venus seen at dawn
- Hanan: The Tagalog goddess of the morning; daughter of Bathala and sister of Tala
- Liwayway: the Tagalog goddess of dawn; a daughter of Bathala

== Europe ==
=== Indo-European ===
- Proto-Indo-European – Hausos (reconstructed proto-goddess)
- Albanian – Afërdita (lit. 'near the day'), Prende
- Armenian – Ayg, Arshaluys
- Greek – Eos
- Germanic – Ēostre
- Hindu - Ushas
- Norse – Dellingr
- Roman – Aurora (and later Mater Matuta)
- Slavic – Zorya
- Irish – Brigid
- Lithuanian – Aušra or Aušrinė
- Latvian – Austra
- Mesopotamian - Aya

=== Non-Indo-European ===
- Etruscan – Thesan, Albina (possibly)
- Georgian – Dali

== See also ==
- Aurvandil
- Proto-Indo-European religion
- List of Lithuanian mythological figures
- List of Philippine mythological figures
- List of solar deities
