= Interpretatio graeca =

Methodology for cultural comparison

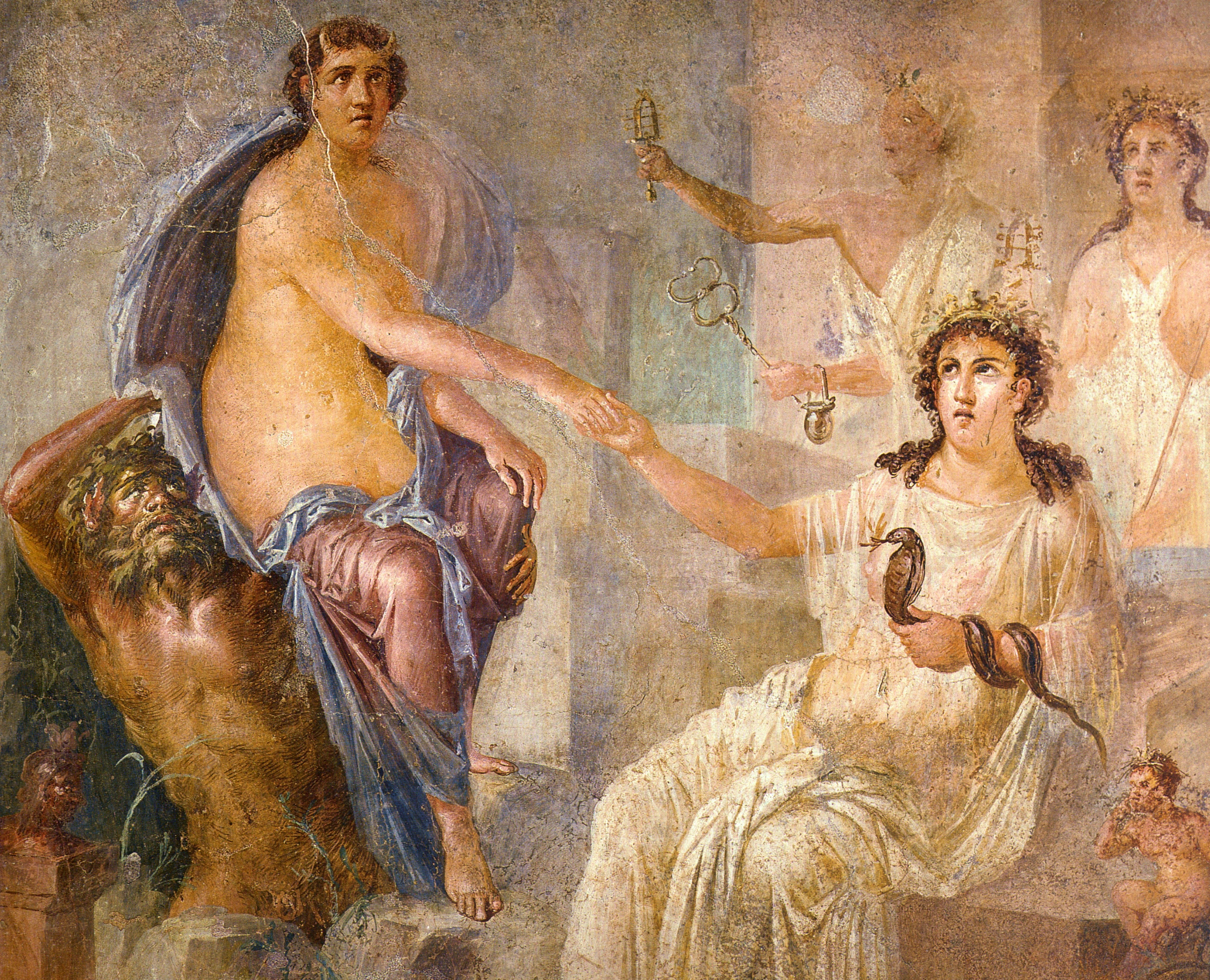
A Roman wall painting showing the Egyptian goddess Isis (seated right) welcoming the Greek heroine Io to Egypt

Interpretatio graeca (Latin for 'Greek translation'), or "interpretation by means of Greek [models]", refers to the tendency of the ancient Greeks to identify foreign deities with their own gods. It is a discourse used to interpret or attempt to understand the mythology and religion of other cultures using familiar terms; a comparative methodology using ancient Greek religious concepts and practices, deities, and myths, equivalencies, and shared characteristics.

The phrase may describe Greek efforts to explain others' beliefs and myths, as when Herodotus describes Egyptian religion in terms of perceived Greek analogues, or when Dionysius of Halicarnassus and Plutarch document Roman cults, temples, and practices under the names of equivalent Greek deities. Interpretatio graeca may also describe non-Greeks' interpretation of their own belief systems by comparison or assimilation with Greek models, as when Romans adapt Greek myths and iconography under the names of their own gods.

Interpretatio romana is comparative discourse in reference to ancient Roman religion and myth, as in the formation of a distinctive Gallo-Roman religion. Both the Romans and the Gauls reinterpreted Gallic religious traditions in relation to Roman models, particularly Imperial cult.

Jan Assmann considers the polytheistic approach to internationalizing gods as a form of "intercultural translation":

The great achievement of polytheism is the articulation of a common semantic universe. ... The meaning of a deity is his or her specific character as it unfolded in myths, hymns, rites, and so on. This character makes a deity comparable to other deities with similar traits. The similarity of gods makes their names mutually translatable. ... The practice of translating the names of the gods created a concept of similarity and produced the idea or conviction that the gods are international.

Pliny the Elder expressed the "translatability" of deities as "different names to different peoples" (nomina alia aliis gentibus). This capacity made possible the religious syncretism of the Hellenistic era and the pre-Christian Roman Empire.

== Examples ==
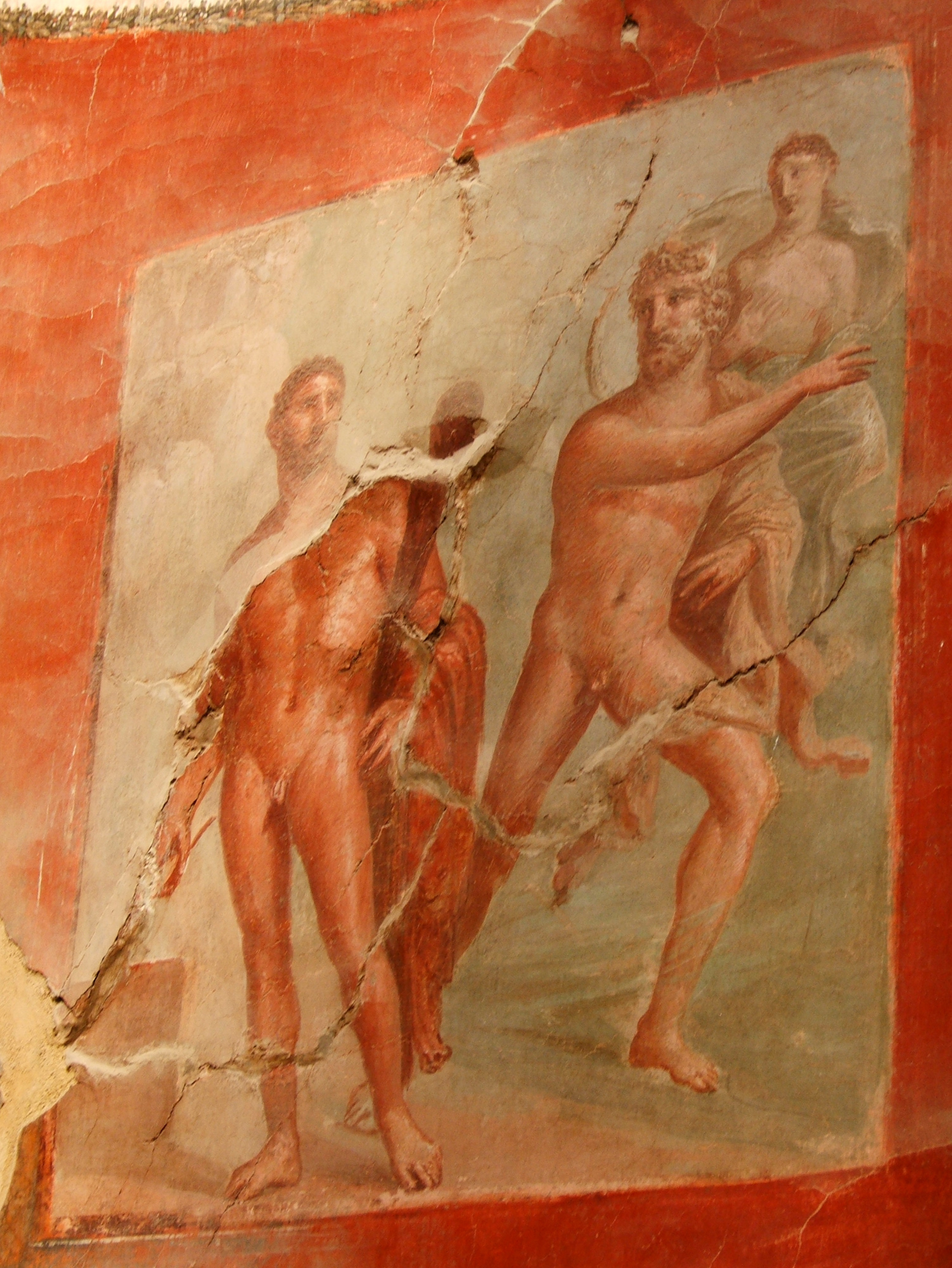
A Roman fresco from Herculaneum depicting Hercules (from Etruscan Hercle and ultimately Greek Heracles) and Achelous (patron deity of the Achelous River in Greece) from Greco-Roman mythology, 1st century AD

Herodotus was one of the earliest authors to engage in this form of interpretation. In his observations regarding the Egyptians, he establishes Greco-Egyptian equivalents that endured into the Hellenistic era, including Amon/Zeus, Osiris/Dionysus, and Ptah/Hephaestus. In his observations regarding the Scythians, he equates their queen of the gods, Tabiti, to Hestia, Papaios and Api to Zeus and Gaia respectively, and Argimpasa to Aphrodite Urania, while also claiming that the Scythians worshipped equivalents to Herakles and Ares, but which he does not name.

Some pairs of Greek and Roman gods, such as Zeus and Jupiter, are thought to derive from a common Indo-European archetype (Dyeus as the supreme sky god), and thus exhibit shared functions by nature. Others required more expansive theological and poetic efforts: though both Ares and Mars are war gods, Ares was a relatively minor figure in Greek religious practice and deprecated by the poets, while Mars was a father of the Roman people and a central figure of archaic Roman religion.

Some deities dating to Rome's oldest religious stratum, such as Janus and Terminus, had no Greek equivalent. Other Greek divine figures, most notably Apollo, were adopted directly into Roman culture, but underwent a distinctly Roman development, as when Augustus made Apollo one of his patron deities. In the early period, Etruscan culture played an intermediary role in transmitting Greek myth and religion to the Romans, as evidenced in the linguistic transformation of Greek Heracles to Etruscan Her[e]cle to Roman Hercules.

== Interpretatio romana ==
The phrase interpretatio romana was first used by the Imperial-era historian Tacitus in the Germania. Tacitus reports that in a sacred grove of the Nahanarvali, "a priest adorned as a woman presides, but they commemorate gods who in Roman terms (interpretatione romana) are Castor and Pollux" when identifying the divine Alcis. Elsewhere, he identifies the principal god of the Germans as Mercury, perhaps referring to Wotan.

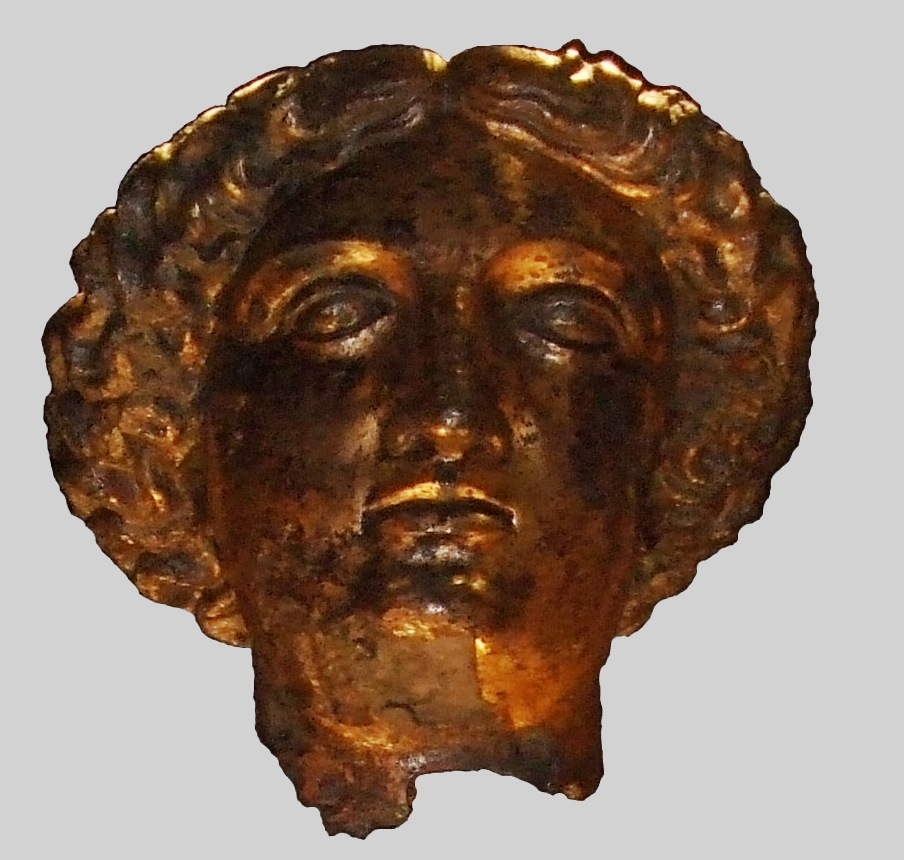
Gilt bronze head from the cult statue of Sulis Minerva from the Temple at Bath

Some information about the deities of the ancient Gauls (the continental Celts), who left no written literature other than inscriptions, is preserved by Greco-Roman sources under the names of Greek and Latin equivalents. A large number of Gaulish theonyms or cult titles are preserved, for instance, in association with Mars. As with some Greek and Roman divine counterparts, the perceived similarities between a Gallic and a Roman or Greek deity may reflect a common Indo-European origin. Lugus was identified with Mercury, Nodens with Mars as healer and protector, and Sulis with Minerva. In some cases, however, a Gallic deity is given an interpretatio romana by means of more than one god, varying among literary texts or inscriptions. Since the religions of the Greco-Roman world were not dogmatic, and polytheism lent itself to multiplicity, the concept of "deity" was often expansive, permitting multiple and even contradictory functions within a single divinity, and overlapping powers and functions among the diverse figures of each pantheon. These tendencies extended to cross-cultural identifications.

In the Eastern empire, the Anatolian storm god with his double-headed axe became Jupiter Dolichenus, a favorite cult figure among soldiers.

=== Application to the Jewish religion ===
Roman scholars such as Varro interpreted the monotheistic god of the Jews into Roman terms as Caelus or Jupiter Optimus Maximus. Some Greco-Roman authors seem to have understood the Jewish invocation of Yahweh Sabaoth as Sabazius. In a similar vein, Plutarch gave an example of a symposium question "Who is the god of the Jews?", by which he meant: "What is his Greek name?" as we can deduce from the first speaker at the symposium, who maintained that the Jews worshiped Dionysus, and that the day of Sabbath was a festival of Sabazius. Lacunae prevent modern scholars from knowing the other speakers' thoughts. Tacitus, on the topic of the Sabbath, claims that "others say that it is an observance in honour of Saturn, either from the primitive elements of their faith having been transmitted from the Idæi, who are said to have shared the flight of that God, and to have founded the race", implying Saturn was the god of the Jews.

From the Roman point of view, it was natural to apply the above principle to the Jewish God. However, the Jews, unlike other peoples living under Roman rule, rejected any such attempt out of hand, regarding such an identification as the worst of sacrilege. This complete divergence of views was one of the factors contributing to the frequent friction between the Jews and the Roman Empire; for example, the Emperor Hadrian's decision to rebuild Jerusalem under the name of Aelia Capitolina, a city dedicated to Jupiter, precipitated the bloodbath of the Bar Kokhba revolt.

Emperor Julian, the 4th century pagan emperor, remarked that "these Jews are in part god-fearing, seeing that they revere a god who is truly most powerful and most good and governs this world of sense, and, as I well know, is worshipped by us also under other names".

In late-antique mysticism, the sun god Helios is sometimes assimilated to the Jewish God as Sabaoth Adonai and as Iao, Sabaoth.

== Identifications ==
The following table is a list of Greek deities and Roman, Etruscan, Egyptian, Phoenician, Zoroastrian, and Celtic ones which the Greeks identified with their own, either explicitly in surviving works, or as supported by the analyses of modern scholars. These are not necessarily gods who share similar traits, and rarely do they share a common origin (for that, see comparative Indo-European pantheons).

Greek	Roman	Etruscan	Egyptian	Phoenician	Zoroastrian	Celtic
Achilles		Achle				
Adonis		Atunis	Osiris	Tammuz (Adōn)		
Amphitrite	Salacia					
Anemoi	Venti				Vayu-Vata	
Aphrodite	Venus	Turan	Hathor / Isis	Astarte	Anahita	
Apollo		Apulu	Horus	Resheph	Mithra	Belenus / Maponos / Borvo / Grannus
Ares	Mars	Laran	Anhur / Montu		Verethragna	Teutates / Nodens / Neton
Artemis	Diana	Artume	Bastet			
Asclepius	Aesculapius / Vejove	Veiove	Imhotep	Eshmun		
Athena	Minerva	Menrva	Neith / Isis	Anat	Anahita	Sulis / Belisama / Senuna / Coventina / Icovellauna / Sequana
Atlas		Aril	Shu			
Boreas	Aquilo					
Atropos	Morta					
Castor and Pollux		Castur and Pultuce				
Charon		Charun				
Clotho	Nona					
Cronus	Saturn	Satre	Geb	El		
Cybele	Magna Mater					
Demeter	Ceres	Zerene	Isis			
Dionysus	Liber / Bacchus	Fufluns	Osiris			
Eileithyia	Lucina	Ilithiia	Tawaret			
Eirene	Pax					
Enyo	Bellona	Enie				
Eos	Aurora / Matuta	Thesan				
Erinyes	Furies					
Eris	Discordia	Eris	Anat			
Eros	Cupid	Erus				
Euterpe		Euturpa				
Eurus	Vulturnus					
Gaia	Terra	Cel				
Hades	Dis Pater / Orcus	Aita	Anubis / Osiris	Mot	Angra Mainyu	See Gaulish Dis Pater
Hebe	Juventas		Renpet			
Hecate	Trivia		Heqet			
Helios	Sol Invictus / Sol Indiges	Usil	Ra	Elagabalus	Mithra	
Hephaestus	Vulcan	Sethlans	Ptah	Kothar-wa-Khasis	Atar	
Hera	Juno	Uni	Mut / Hathor			
Heracles	Hercules	Hercle	Heryshaf / Shu	Melqart		Ogmios
Hermes	Mercury	Turms	Anubis / Thoth	Taautus		Lugus (?) / Artaius (?) / Moccus / Visucius / Cissonius
Hesperus	Vesper			Shalim		
Hestia	Vesta		Anuket			
Hygeia	Salus					
Iris	Arcus / Iris		Nut			
Lachesis	Decima					
Leto	Latona	Letun	Wadjet			
Maia						Rosmerta
Moirai	Fates or Parcae					
Muses	Camenae					
Nike	Victoria	Meanpe				
Notus	Auster					
Odysseus	Ulysses (Ulixes)	Uthste				
Palaemon	Portunus					
Pan	Faunus		Min			
Persephone	Proserpina	Persipnei				
Phaon		Phaun				
Pheme	Fama					
Phosphoros	Lucifer			Attar		
Poseidon	Neptune	Nethuns	Sobek	Yam	Apam Napat	
Priapus	Mutunus Tutunus					
Prometheus		Prumathe				
Rhea	Ops / Magna Mater		Nut	Asherah		
Selene	Luna	Losna / Tiur	Isis			
Silenus	Silvanus	Selvans				Sucellus
Thallo		Thalna				
Thanatos	Mors	Leinth / Charun	Anubis	Mot		
Tyche	Fortuna	Nortia		Gad		
Typhon			Set / Apophis			
Uranus	Caelus		Nut	El	Asman	
Zephyrus	Favonius					
Zeus	Jupiter (Jove)	Tinia	Amun	Hadad (Baal)	Ahura Mazda	Taranis

== In art ==
Examples of deities depicted in syncretic compositions by means of interpretatio graeca or romana:

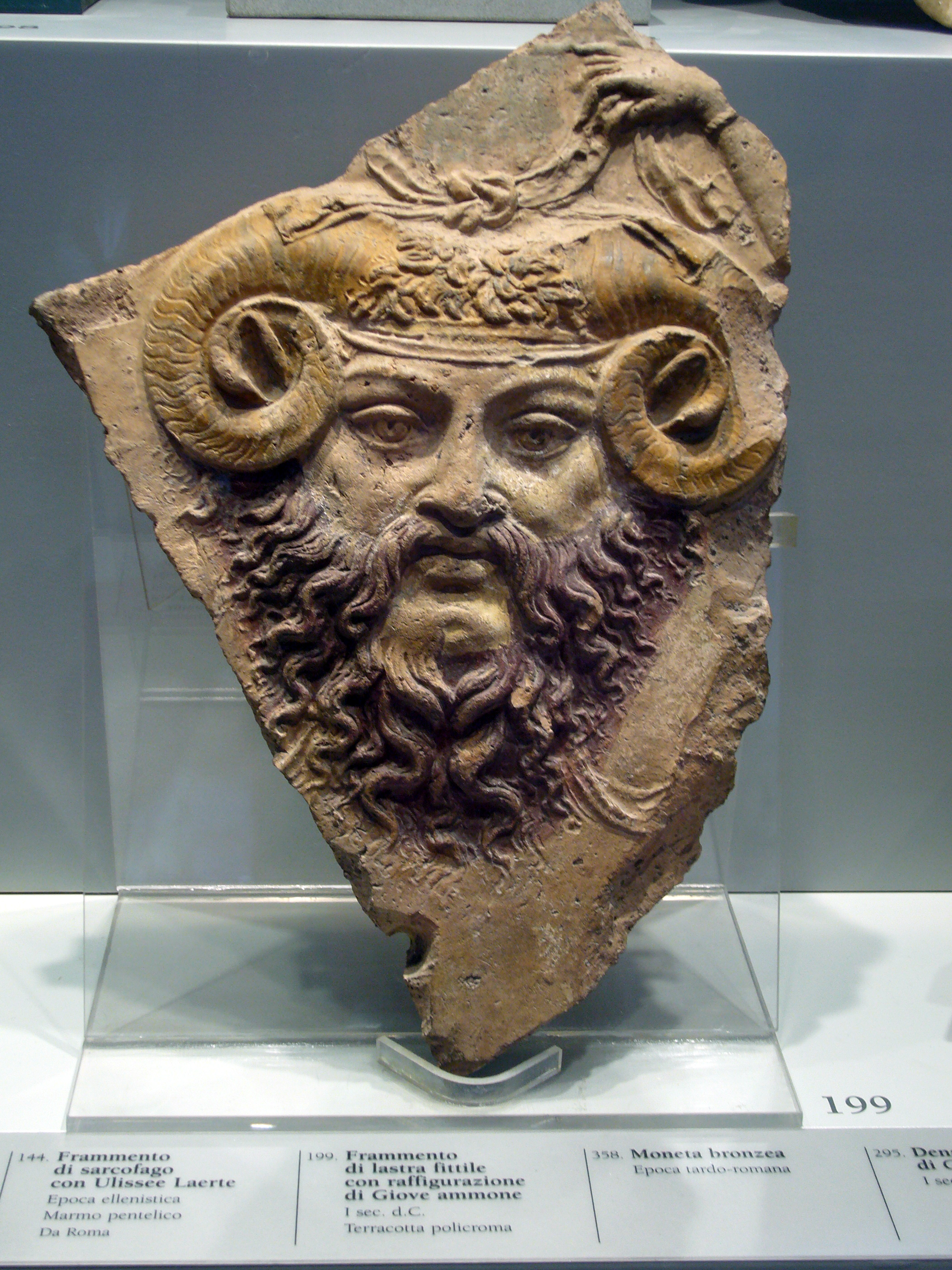
Jupiter Ammon (terracotta of Hellenistic style, 1st century AD)

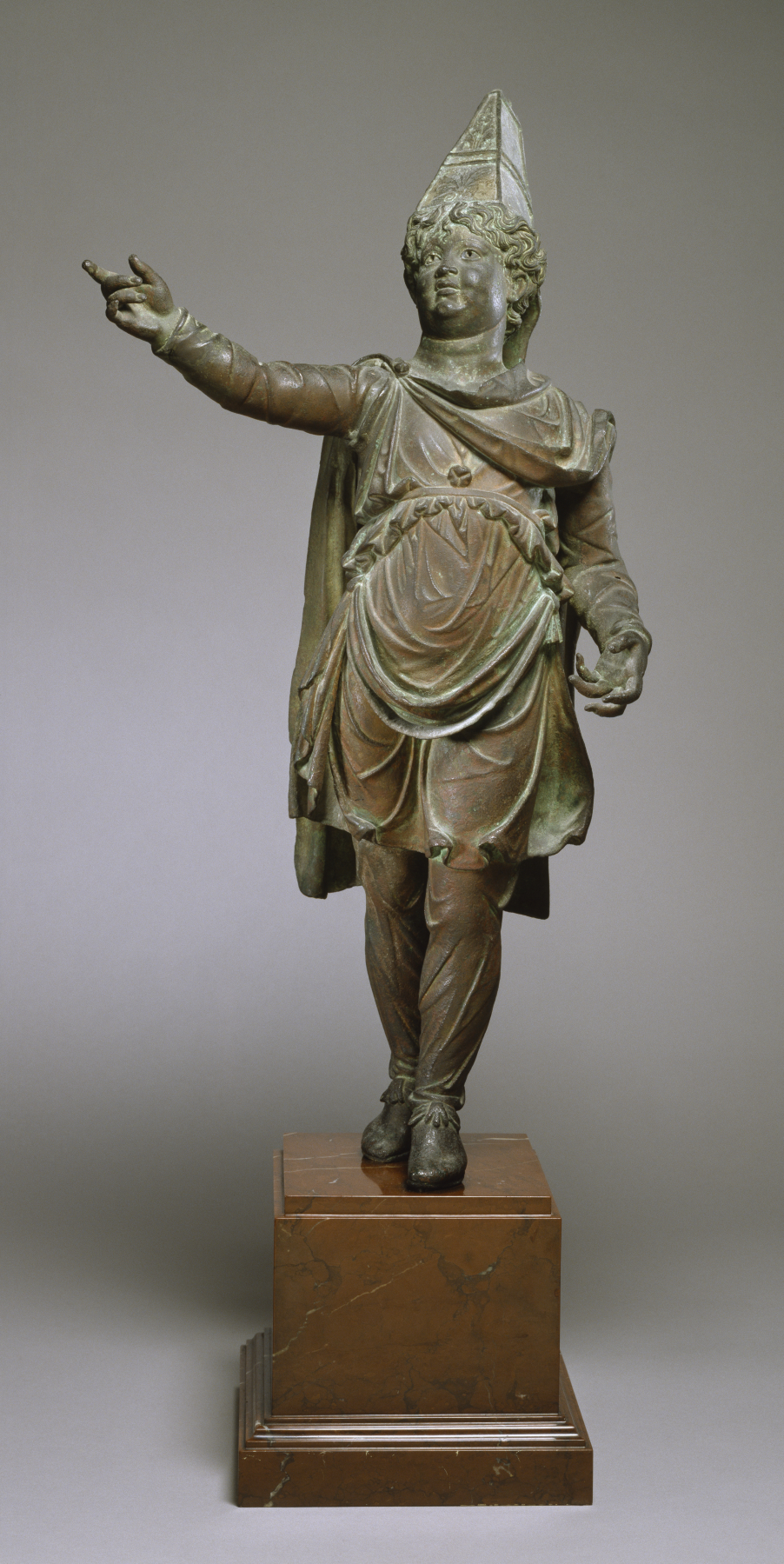
Syncretized figure from the Eastern provinces, perhaps a Genius (1st century BC – 1st century AD)

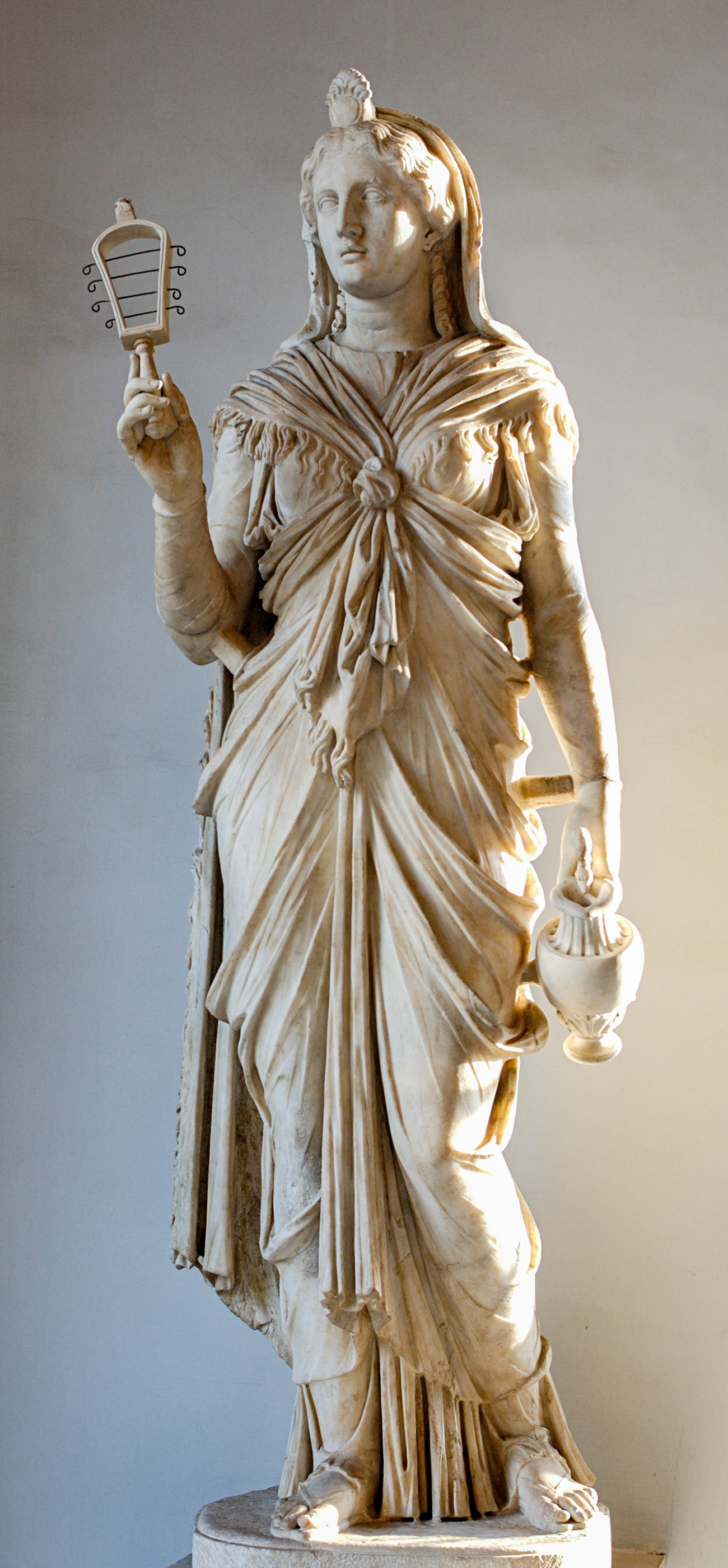
Isis holding sistrum and oinochoe (Roman marble, reign of Hadrian)

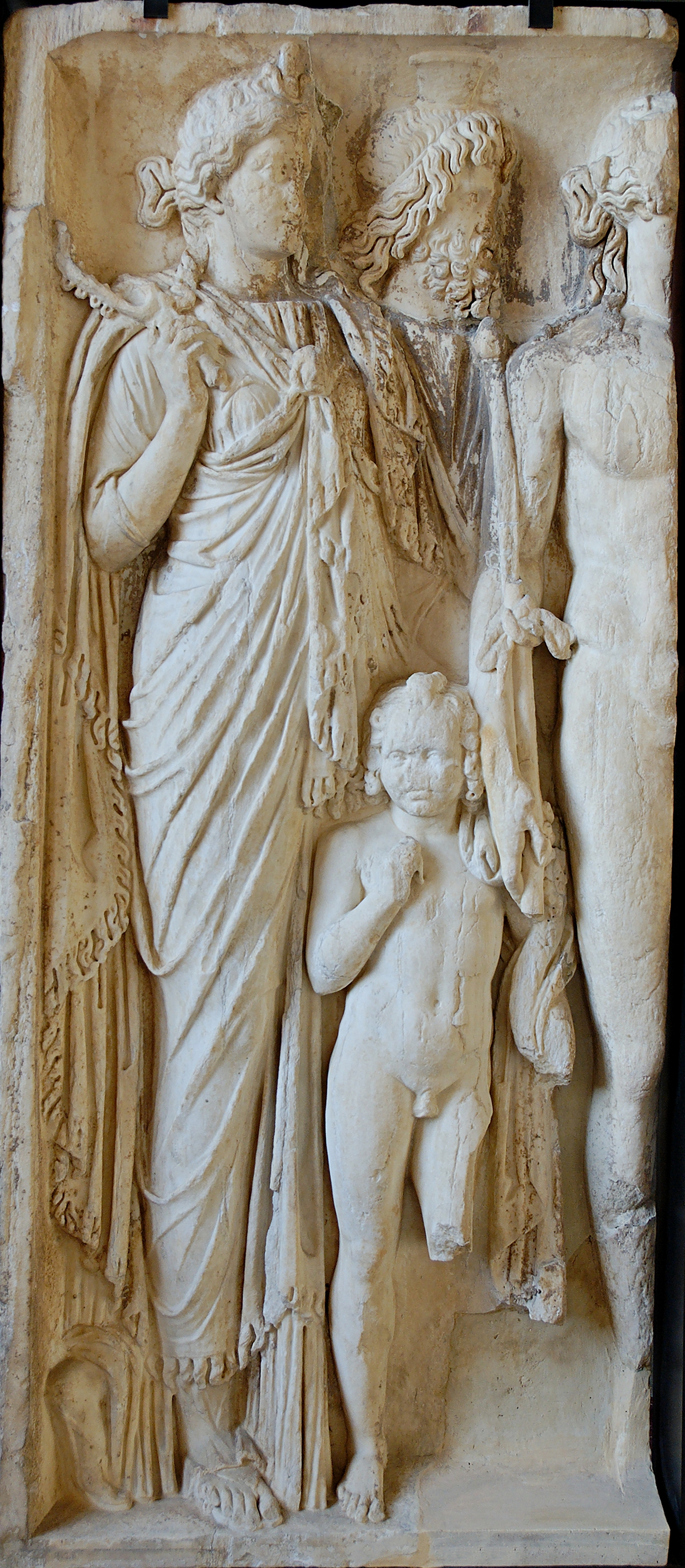
Isis, Serapis, the child Harpocrates and Dionysos (relief from Roman Africa, late 2nd century AD)

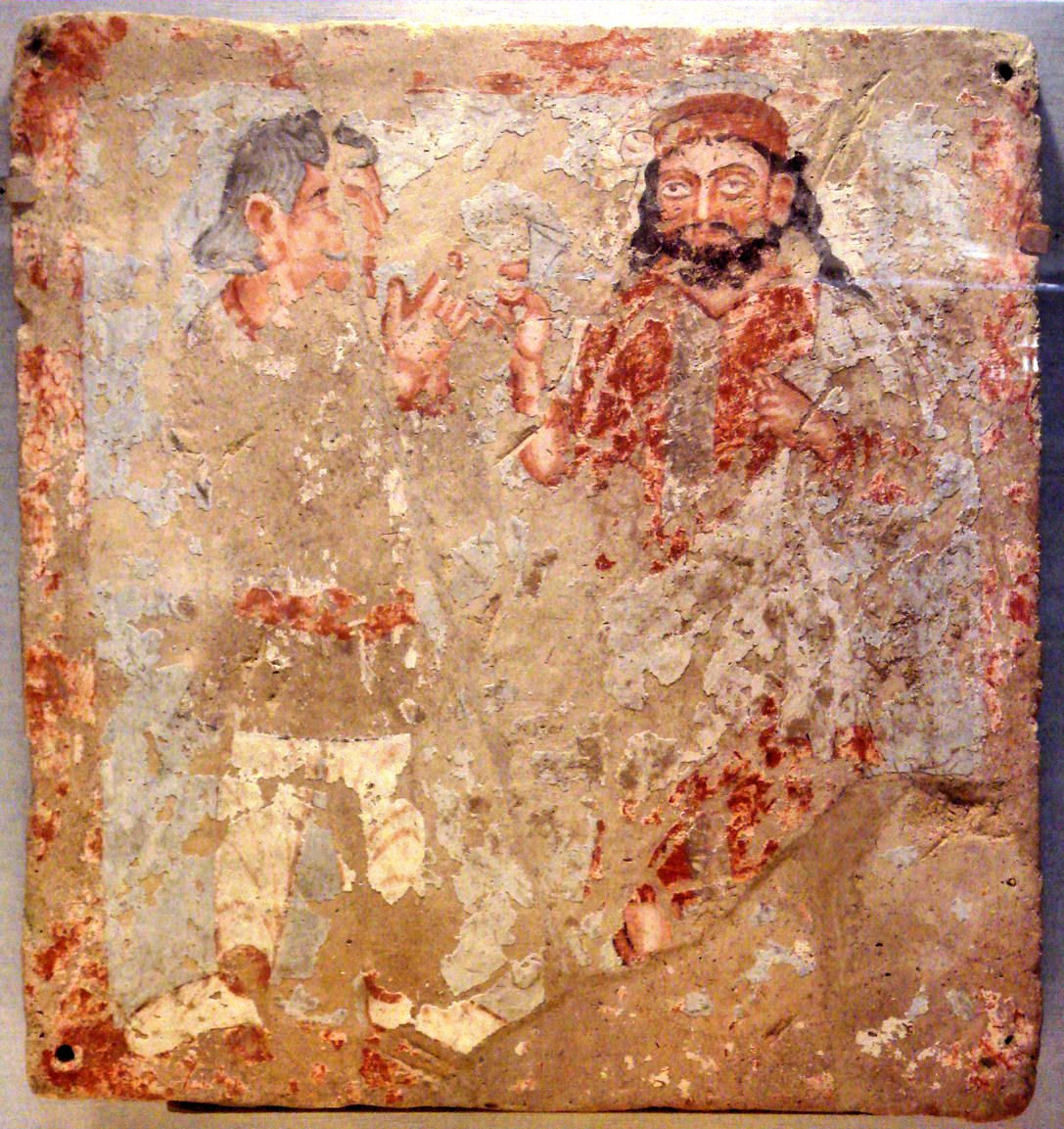
Worshipper before Zeus–Serapis–Ohrmazd (Bactria, 3rd century AD)

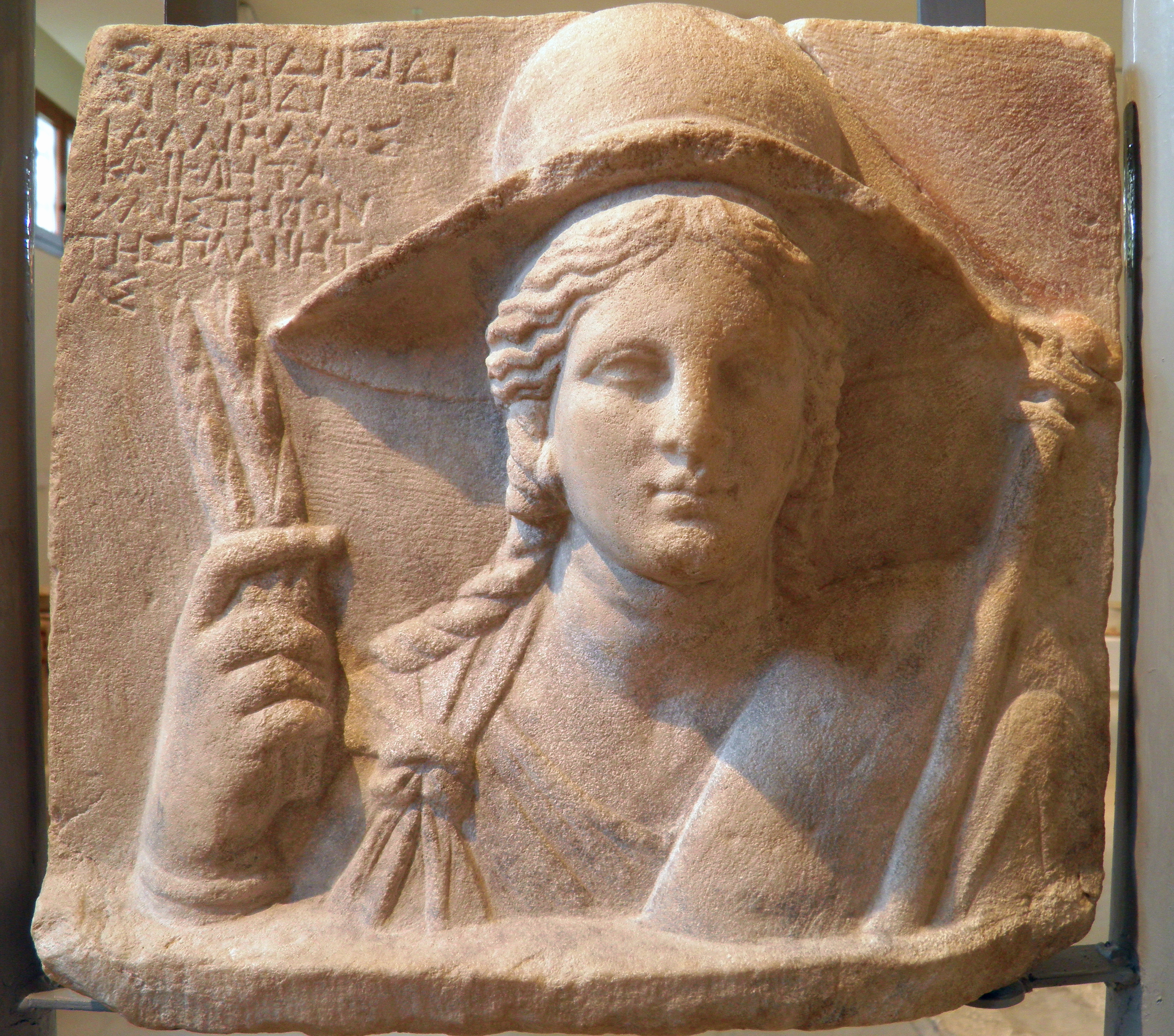
Votive relief to Isis-Demeter from Dion, Hellenistic period.

== See also ==
- Aion (deity)
- Mystery religions
- Honji suijaku, in Japan
- Interpretatio germanica
- Interpretatio Christiana
- Celtic deities
- Proto-Indo-European religion, a reconstructed religion that relates Greek deities to other Indo-European deities
- Shinbutsu-shūgō, a Japanese amalgamation of Buddhist and Shinto deities
- Syncretism
- Three teachings, Buddhism, Confucianism and Taoism as harmonious aggregate in Chinese philosophy.
- Unknown god
