= Time and fate deities =

Time and fate deities are personifications of time, often in the sense of human lifetime and human fate, in polytheistic religions.

== Africa ==
=== Ancient Egyptian religion ===
- Huh
- Hemsut
- Shai
- Neith, as a goddess who represented time

=== Dahomey mythology ===
- Gbadu

=== Igbo ===
- Ikenga

=== Yoruba ===
- Ori
- Ọrunmila

== Americas ==
=== Lakota ===
- Etu, personification of time

== Asia ==
=== Bali ===
- Batara Kala

=== Buddhism ===
- Mahakala

=== Hinduism ===
- Kala
- Kali
- Shiva
- Surya
- Navagraha

=== Korea ===
- Samgong

=== Mari ===
- Purysho, god of fate who creates the future of all men

=== Daoism ===
- Jīn Bàn, god of fate of the years 1924, 1984, 2044, 2104...
- Chén Cái, god of fate of the years 1925, 1985, 2045, 2105...
- Gěng Zhāng, god of fate of the years 1926, 1986, 2046, 2106...
- Shěn Xīng, god of fate of the years 1927, 1987, 2047, 2107...
- Zhào Dá, god of fate of the years 1928, 1988, 2048, 2108...
- Guō Càn, god of fate of the years 1929, 1989, 2049, 2109...
- Wáng Qīng, god of fate of the years 1930, 1990, 2050, 2110...
- Lǐ Sù, god of fate of the years 1931, 1991, 2051, 2111...
- Liú Wàng, god of fate of the years 1932, 1992, 2052, 2112...
- Kāng Zhì, god of fate of the years 1933, 1993, 2053, 2113...
- Shī Guǎng, god of fate of the years 1934, 1994, 2054, 2114...
- Rèn Bǎo, god of fate of the years 1935, 1995, 2055, 2115...
- Guō Jiā, god of fate of the years 1936, 1996, 2056, 2116...
- Wāng Wén, god of fate of the years 1937, 1997, 2057, 2117...
- Zēng Guāng, god of fate of the years 1938, 1998, 2058, 2118...
- Lóng Zhòng, god of fate of the years 1939, 1999, 2059, 2119...
- Dǒng Dé, god of fate of the years 1940, 2000, 2060, 2120...
- Zhèng Dàn, god of fate of the years 1941, 2001, 2061, 2121...
- Lù Míng, god of fate of the years 1942, 2002, 2062, 2122...
- Wèi Rén, god of fate of the years 1943, 2003, 2063, 2123...
- Fāng Jié, god of fate of the years 1944, 2004, 2064, 2124...
- Jiǎng Chóng, god of fate of the years 1945, 2005, 2065, 2125...
- Bái Mǐn, god of fate of the years 1946, 2006, 2066, 2126...
- Fēng Jì, god of fate of the years 1947, 2007, 2067, 2127...
- Zōu Tāng, god of fate of the years 1948, 2008, 2068, 2128...
- Pān Zuǒ, god of fate of the years 1949, 2009, 2069, 2129...
- Wū Huán, god of fate of the years 1950, 2010, 2070, 2130...
- Fàn Níng, god of fate of the years 1951, 2011, 2071, 2131...
- Péng Tài, god of fate of the years 1952, 2012, 2072, 2132...
- Xú Huá, god of fate of the years 1953, 2013, 2073, 2133...
- Zhāng Cí, god of fate of the years 1954, 2014, 2074, 2134...
- Yáng Xiān, god of fate of the years 1955, 2015, 2075, 2135...
- Guǎn Zhòng, god of fate of the years 1956, 2016, 2076, 2136...
- Táng Jié, god of fate of the years 1957, 2017, 2077, 2137...
- Jiāng Wǔ, god of fate of the years 1958, 2018, 2078, 2138...
- Xiè Dào, god of fate of the years 1959, 2019, 2079, 2139...
- Yú Qǐ, god of fate of the years 1960, 2020, 2080, 2140...
- Yáng Xìn, god of fate of the years 1961, 2021, 2081, 2141...
- Xián È, god of fate of the years 1962, 2022, 2082, 2142...
- Pí Shí, god of fate of the years 1963, 2023, 2083, 2143...
- Lǐ Chéng, god of fate of the years 1964, 2024, 2084, 2144...
- Wú Suì, god of fate of the years 1965, 2025, 2085, 2145...
- Wén Zhé, god of fate of the years 1966, 2026, 2086, 2146...
- Móu Bǐng, god of fate of the years 1967, 2027, 2087, 2147...
- Xú Hào, god of fate of the years 1968, 2028, 2088, 2148...
- Chéng Bǎo, god of fate of the years 1969, 2029, 2089, 2149...
- Ní Mì, god of fate of the years 1970, 2030, 2090, 2150...
- Yè Jiān, god of fate of the years 1971, 2031, 2091, 2151...
- Qiū Dé, god of fate of the years 1972, 2032, 2092, 2152...
- Zhū Dé, god of fate of the years 1973, 2033, 2093, 2153...
- Zhāng Zhāo, god of fate of the years 1974, 2034, 2094, 2154...
- Wàn Qīng, god of fate of the years 1975, 2035, 2095, 2155...
- Xīn Yà, god of fate of the years 1976, 2036, 2096, 2156...
- Yáng Yàn, god of fate of the years 1977, 2037, 2097, 2157...
- Lí Qīng, god of fate of the years 1978, 2038, 2098, 2158...
- Fù Dǎng, god of fate of the years 1979, 2039, 2099, 2159...
- Máo Zǐ, god of fate of the years 1980, 2040, 2100, 2160...
- Shí Zhèng, god of fate of the years 1981, 2041, 2101, 2161...
- Hóng Chōng, god of fate of the years 1982, 2042, 2102, 2162...
- Yú Chéng, god of fate of the years 1983, 2043, 2103, 2163...

=== Western Asia ===
- Anunnaki, major Mesopotamian deities of fate
- Nabu, Babylonian god of writing, inscribed the fates
- Hutena and Hutellura, Hurrian goddesses of fate
- Istustaya and Papaya, Hittite goddesses of destiny
- Mamitu, Akkadian goddess of fate and destiny
- Manāt, pre-Islamic goddess of fate
- Namtar, minor Mesopotamian deity of fate/destiny
- Lelwani, Hittite underworld deity who also determined fates

=== The Philippines ===
- Bangun Bangun (Suludnon mythology): the deity of universal time who regulates cosmic movements
- Patag'aes (Suludnon mythology): awaits until midnight then enters the house to have a conversation with the living infant; if he discovers someone is eavesdropping, he will choke the child to death; their conversation creates the fate of the child, on how long the child wants to live and how the child will eventually die, where the child will always get to choose the answers; once done, Patag'aes takes out his measuring stick, computes the child's life span, and then departs, sealing the child's fate
- D’wata, a general name (T'boli mythology): the general term for the gods; guard lives and determine fate and destiny
- Muhen (T'boli mythology): a bird god of fate whose song when heard is thought to presage misfortune; any undertaking is immediately abandoned or postponed when one hears the Muhen sing

=== Zoroastrianism ===
- Zurvan

=== Vietnam ===
- Nam Tào
- Bắc Đẩu
- Twelve Hành binh alternated through the years
- Twelve Hành khiển alternated through the years
- Twelve Phán quan alternated through the years

== Europe ==
=== Indo-European ===
==== Albanian ====
- Fatia
- Mira
- Ora
- Zana

==== Baltic ====
- Dalia
- Deivės Valdytojos, Lithuanian group of seven goddesses who weave garments from human lives
  - Dekla, Latvian goddess of fate
  - Karta, Latvian goddess of fate
  - Gegute, Lithuanian goddess of time
  - Kruonis, Lithuanian goddess of time
  - Laima, Latvian goddess of fate
  - Veliuona, Lithuanian goddess of death, the afterlife, and eternity
  - Verpėja, Lithuanian goddess who weaves the thread of one's life

==== Germanic ====
- Norns
  - Urdr, Norn of the past
  - Verdandi, Norn of the present
  - Skuld, Norn of the future
- Sumarr and Vetr, the seasons personified
- Wyrd, the Anglo-Saxon cognate of Urdr

==== Greek ====
- Aion
- Ananke
- Chronos (a Protogenos, not to be confused with the Titan, Cronus)
- Heimarmene
- Horae
- Kairos
- Moirai
  - Atropos
  - Clotho
  - Lachesis
- Moros
- Apollo, as a god who represented prophecy
- Themis, normally associated with law and order, but had an oracle and was also associated with prophecy.
- Tyche

==== Roman ====
- Aeternitas
- Anna Perenna
- Antevorta, goddess of the future, one of the Camenae
- Janus
- Parcae
  - Decima
  - Morta
  - Nona
- Postverta, goddess of the past, one of the Camenae
- Vertumnus
- Fortuna
- Saturn

==== Romanian ====
- Ursitoare

==== Slavic ====
- Deities and fairies of fate in Slavic mythology

=== Other European ===
==== Etruscan ====
- Dii involuti
- Nortia

Gallic and Celtic deities

- Arianrhod
- The Morrigan
- The Dagda
- Alaunas
- Brigid

== See also ==
- List of deities
- Time
- Time cycles (redirect to "calendar")
- Wheel of time
- Father Time
