= Tollere liberum =

Ancient Roman tradition

The tollere liberum (from tollere, to raise; liber, child) was an ancient Roman tradition in which a man picked up a newly born infant from the ground and lifted them in the air to display his acceptance of them as part of his household. It was commonly the father, or in some cases the chief of the house, who performed the task. In some variations of the tradition the man would carry them around a portion of earth (similar to the Greek amphidromia).

== History ==
By the 2nd century AD the practice was out of fashion and almost forgotten about, but a seemingly similar practice called suscipere liberum appears in legal documents. It was also sometimes simply called suscipio.

== Importance ==
The tollere liberum had no legal importance and did not imply that the father legally accepted paternity or confirmed legitimacy of the child. It was largely regarded as a symbolic gesture and its omission (if for example the father was not at home) did not affect the child's position in the family in any way. The legal initiation of a child into the familia occurred on the dies lustricus when they were given their personal name. In the past it was thought by historians that the event did have a bearing and meant that the man acknowledged paternity of the baby, but this has been rejected in the 20th century. It was believed that if the father did not perform the act that it was an implication that the infant should be exposed.

== Cultural depictions ==
In modern popular culture, scenes have been shown in which Roman dictator Julius Caesar picks up his son Caesarion and shows him to onlookers. Examples are in the 1963 film Cleopatra in which it is anachronistically stated that it is law that a man declares paternity if he picks up a child from the ground; the 1999 miniseries Cleopatra where Cleopatra VII places the child in front of him and demands that he accept the boy in front of the Roman imperial court; and the HBO television series Rome where Caesar proudly displays the boy for his legionaries.

== See also ==
- Family in ancient Rome
- Childhood in ancient Rome
- List of Roman birth and childhood deities
