= Aplu =

Aplu, APLU may refer to:

- Aplu (mythology), an epithet of the Etruscan fire god Śuri
- Asia Pacific Lacrosse Union, the governing body of lacrosse in Asia and Oceania
- Association of Public and Land-grant Universities, an organization of public higher education organizations in the United States
