= Parcae =

Fates in Roman mythology

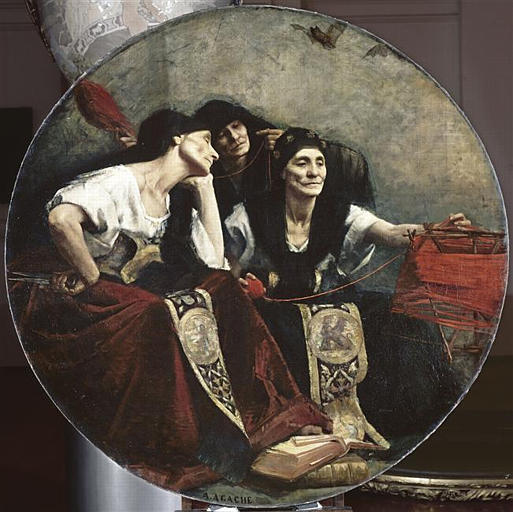
Les Parques ("The Parcae," ca. 1885) by Alfred Agache

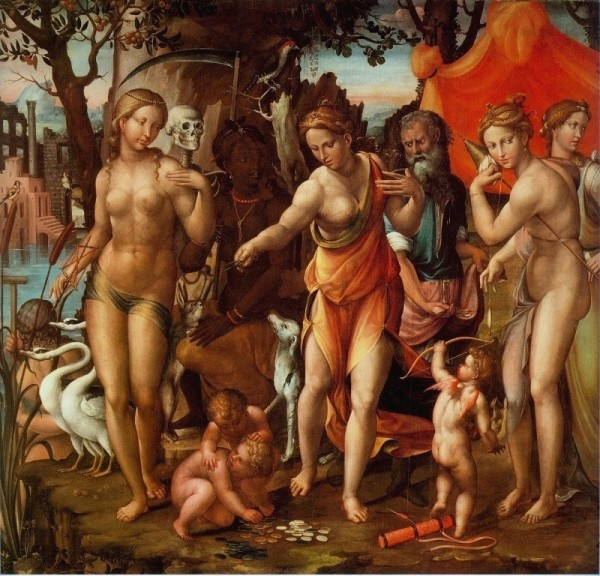
The Three Parcae (1540-1550), by Marco Bigio, in Villa Barberini, Rome

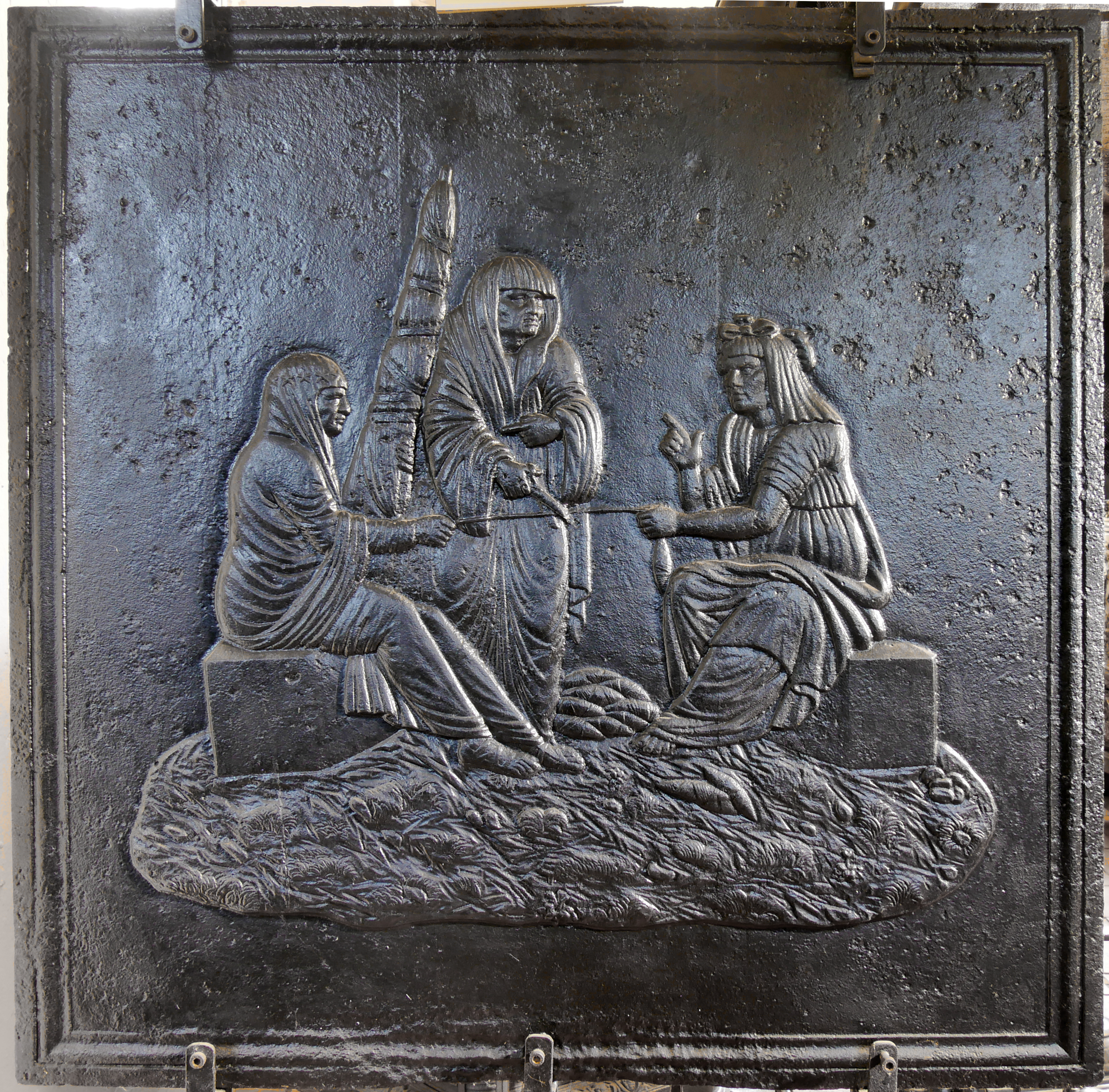
Fireback with Parcae

In ancient Roman religion and myth, the Parcae (singular: Parca) were the female personifications of destiny who directed the lives (and deaths) of humans and gods. They are often called the Fates in English, and their Greek equivalent were the Moirai. They did not control a person's actions except when they are born, when they die, and how much they suffer.

The Parcae recorded the metaphorical thread of life of every mortal and immortal from birth to death. Even the gods feared them, and by some sources Jupiter was also subject to their power.

Nona was supposed to determine a person's lifespan on the dies lustricus, that is, the day on which the name of the child was chosen, which occurred on the ninth day from birth for a male and the eighth for a female.

The recurrence of the nundinae was also considered a dies festus and as such nefas by some Roman scholars as Julius Caesar and Cornelius Labeo, because on it the flaminica dialis offered the sacrifice of a goat to Jupiter in the Regia.

According to some treatments, the Parcae seem to be more powerful than many, or perhaps even all, of the gods: "The power of the Parcae was great and extensive. Some suppose that they were subjected to none of the gods but Jupiter; while others support that even Jupiter himself was obedient to their commands; and indeed we see the father of the gods, in Homer's Iliad, unwilling to see Patroclus perish, yet obliged, by the superior power of the Fates, to abandon him to his destiny." Similarly: "We have the clearest evidence of the poet for it, that whatever happens to us is under the influence of the Parcae. Jupiter himself can not interfere to save his son Sarpedon."

== Names and sources ==
The names of the three Parcae are:

- Nona (Greek equivalent Clotho), who spun the thread of life from her distaff onto her spindle;
- Decima (Greek equivalent Lachesis), who measured the thread of life with her rod;
- Morta (Greek equivalent Atropos), who cut the thread of life and chose the manner of a person's death.

The earliest extant documents referencing these deities are three small stelae (cippi) found near ancient Lavinium shortly after World War II. They bear the inscription:

Neuna fata, Neuna dono, Parca Maurtia dono

The names of two of the three Roman Parcae are recorded (Neuna = Nona, Maurtia = Morta) and connected to the concept of fata.

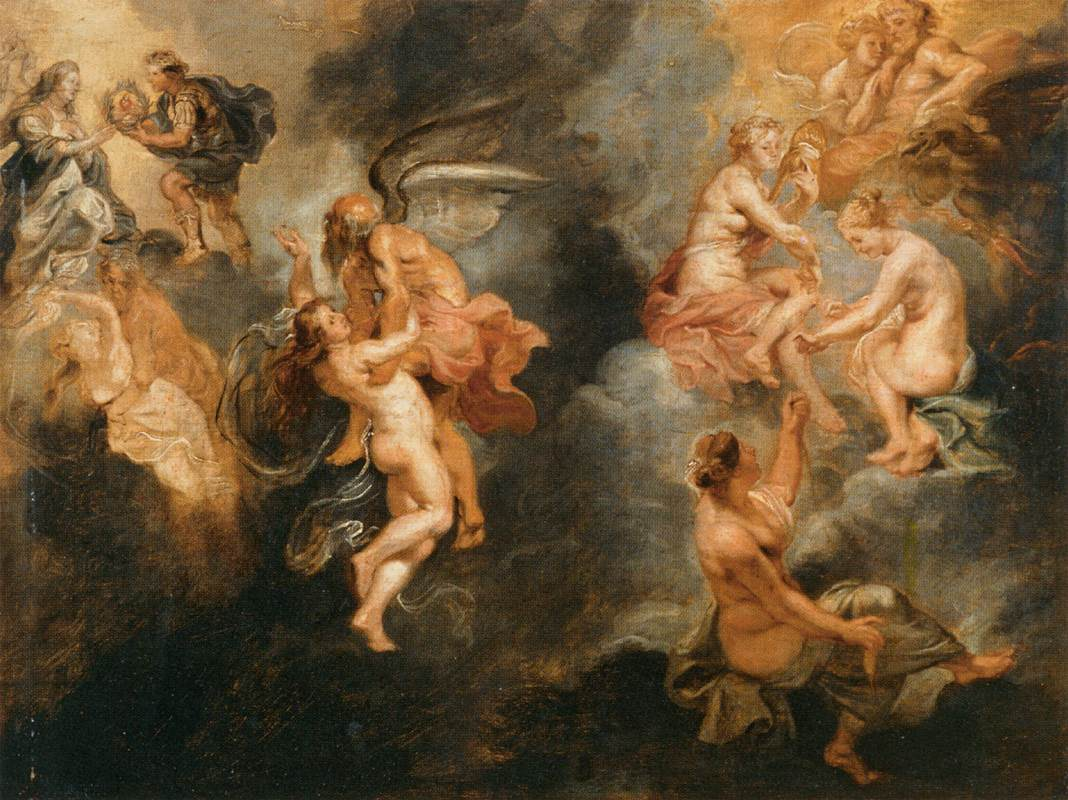
The Three Parcae Spinning the Fate of Marie de' Medici (1622-1625) by Peter Paul Rubens

One of the sources for the Parcae is Metamorphoses by Ovid, II 654, V 532, VIII 452, XV 781. Another source is Aeneid by Virgil, in the opening of Book I.

== See also ==
- Fates
- Laima
- Matrones
- Moirai
- Norns
- List of Roman birth and childhood deities
