= Artume =

Etruscan goddess of animals

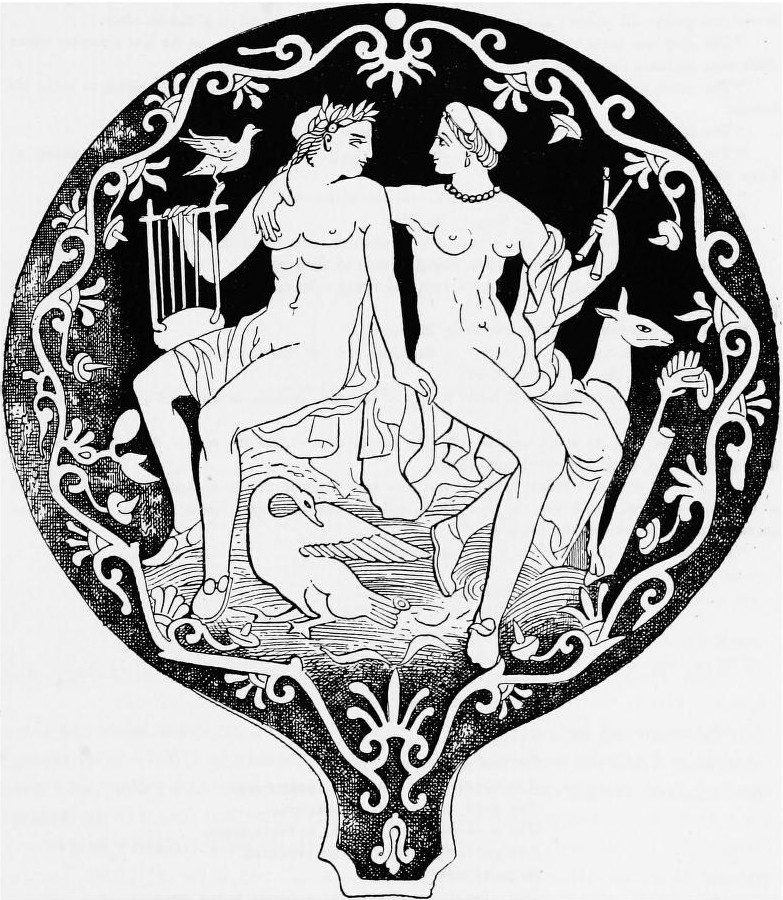
- Artume (right) with her brother Aplu
- Etruscan: 𐌀𐌓𐌕𐌖𐌌𐌄𐌔
- Animals: Deer

Genealogy
- Parents: Tinia and Letun
- Siblings: Aplu (twin brother); Turms

Equivalents
- Greek: Artemis
- Roman: Diana (mythology)

Artume (also called Artemisia, Aritimi, Artames, or Artumes) was an Etruscan goddess who was the mistress of animals, goddess of human assemblies, and hunting deity of Neolithic origin. She was a daughter of Tinia and Letun, and she had two siblings: A brother called Turms and a twin brother named Aplu. Her Greek counterpart was Artemis and her Roman counterpart Diana; however, Etruscans later appropriated the Greek goddess Artemis. Aritimi was also considered the founder of the Etruscan town Aritie which is today the Italian town Arezzo.

Artemisia also appears to be the name of a particular vampire in Italian folklore, but it is unclear if this is connected to the Etruscan goddess.

== Depictions and mythology ==
Artume may have been depicted by Etruscans as early as ca. 600 BCE, on a silvered bronze belt buckle. The image shows a woman, often referred to as Potnia Theron (The Mistress of Animals), accompanied by two male attendants with a pair of wolf pups jumping up towards her. The exact identity of Potnia Theron is unknown, as no known depictions of her have an inscribed name, and it's possible that she represents an unrelated goddess.

She is shown on two different mirrors transporting a body labeled "Esia" to Minerva and Fufluns. This may be depicting the Etruscan version of a Greek myth where after Artemis kills Ariadne, she takes her body to Dionysus to be revived and made immortal. There is also a mirror depicting the young Artume and Aplu slaying the Python of Delphi together. This differs from typical Greek mythos, where Apollo slew the python on his own.

In addition to the repetitively few depictions of her, Artume notably absent from the Liver of Piacenza, suggesting that she was not as well-known to the Etruscans as Artemis was to the Greeks. There are no known Etruscan temples or shrines dedicated specifically to her.

Artume is depicted as a male figure on several occasions, including on a mirror depicting the myth of the Golden Fleece. There is also a small bronze votive statue of a male figure inscribed with the name Aritimi.

== Artume in popular culture ==
Artume appeared as a recurring character in Marvel Comics. However, this is not the goddess, but a daughter of Hippolyta in Marvel Comics, similar to how her DC counterpart uses the goddess's Roman name.
