= Apulu =

Etruscan god

Apulu (Aplu)
- God of the Sun and light, thunder and lightning, healing and plague
- Member of Novensiles
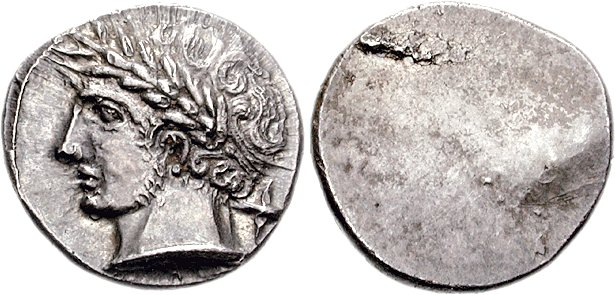
- Apulu on a coin from Populonia.
- Other names: Rath, Śuri, Usil, Vetis
- Mount: Mt. Soratte
- Gender: male
- Region: Italy
- Ethnic group: Etruscans

Genealogy
- Parents: Tinia and Semla
- Siblings: Fufluns; Artume
- Consort: Catha

Equivalents
- Greek: Apollo
- Roman: Apollo Soranus
- Hittite: Apaliunas

Apulu (Etruscan: 𐌀𐌐𐌖𐌋𐌖), also syncopated as Aplu (Etruscan: 𐌀𐌐𐌋𐌖), is an epithet of the Etruscan fire god Śuri as chthonic sky god, roughly equivalent to the Greco-Roman god Apollo. Their names are associated on Pyrgi inscriptions too. The name Apulu or Aplu did not come directly from Greece but via a Latin center, probably Palestrina.

Under the name Apulu, he is known as god of the Sun and light, thunder and lightning, healing and plague, as well as the protector of divination, but he also has volcanic and infernal characteristics.

He was also known as Rath, Usil and Vetis, among other names.

== Mentions and iconography ==
He's mentioned as son of Tinia and Semla, brother of Fufluns and twin brother of Aritimi.

In art, he is depicted with a crown and laurel branches. His most famous representation is the Apollo of Veii, attributed to Vulcas.

He does not appear on the Liver of Piacenza.

== In other cultures ==
=== Greco-Roman equivalent ===
The national divinity of the Greeks, Apollo has been recognized as a god of archery, music and dance, truth and prophecy, healing and diseases, the Sun and light, poetry, and more.

Medicine and healing are associated with Apollo, whether through the god himself or mediated through his son Asclepius. Apollo delivered people from epidemics, yet he is also a god who could bring ill-health and deadly plague with his arrows. The invention of archery itself is credited to Apollo and his sister Artemis. Apollo is also an important pastoral deity, and was the patron of herdsmen and shepherds. Protection of herds, flocks and crops from diseases, pests and predators were his primary duties.

As the god of mousike, (Note: Mousike (the art of the Muses) was an integral part of life in the ancient Greek world, and the term covered not only music but also dance, lyrics, theatre and the performance of poetry.) Apollo presides over all music, songs, dance and poetry. On the other hand, Apollo also encouraged founding new towns and establishment of civil constitution. He is associated with dominion over colonists. He was the giver of laws, and his oracles were consulted before setting laws in a city.

== See also ==
- Agyieus
- List of Etruscan mythological figures
- Fufluns
