= Family in ancient Rome =

Role of family in ancient Roman society

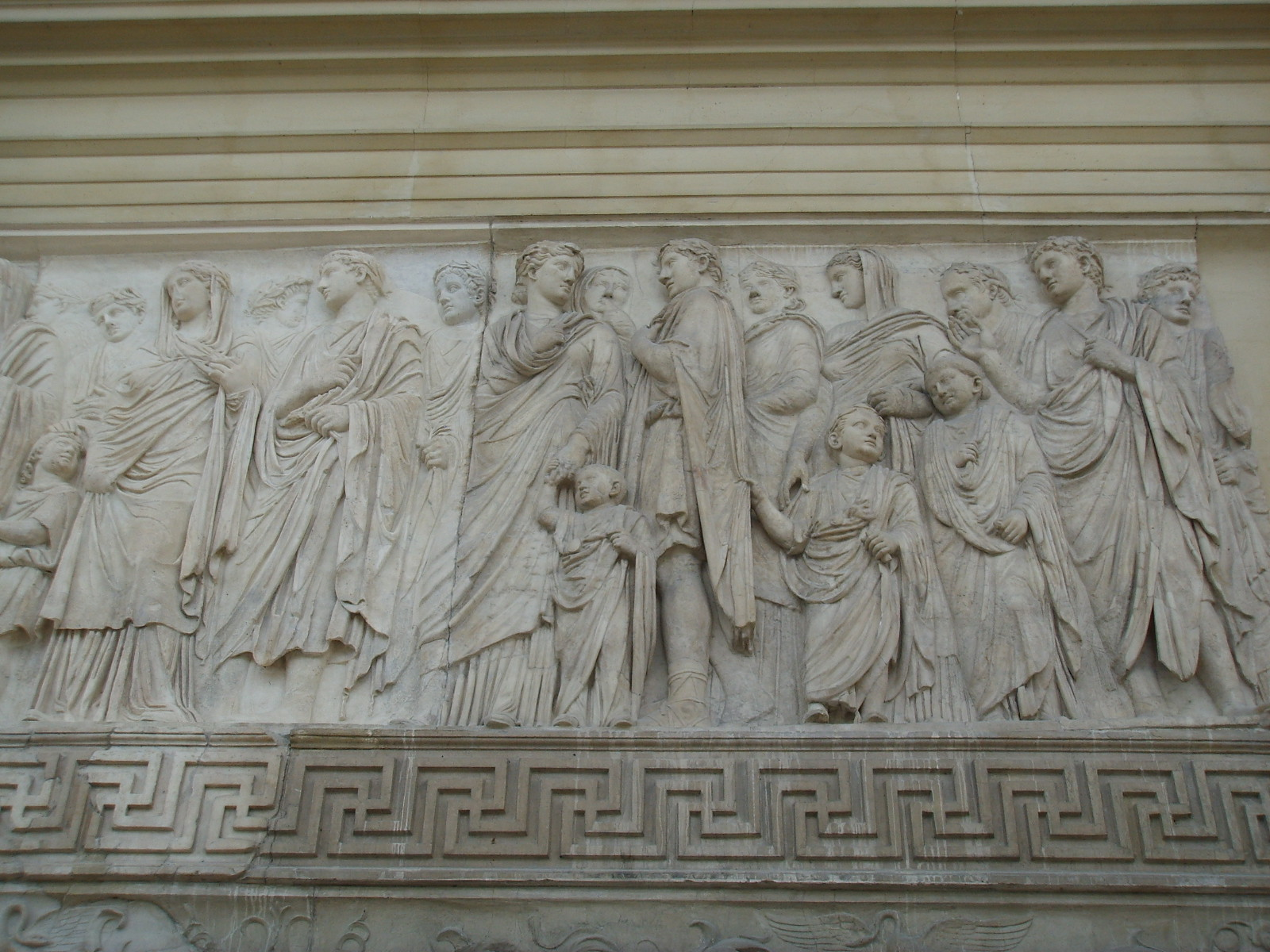
Ara Pacis showing the imperial family of Augustus

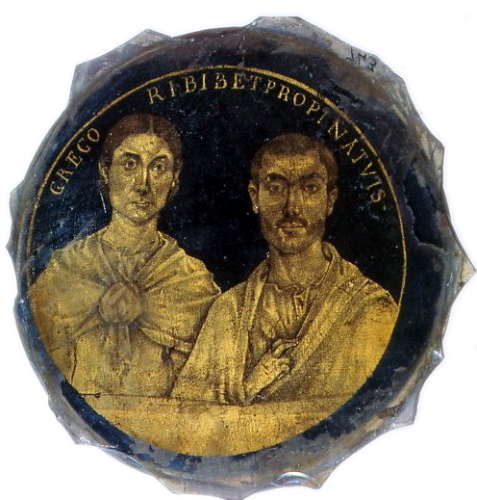
Gold glass portrait of husband and wife (Biblioteca Apostolica Vaticana, Museo Sacro)

The ancient Roman family was a complex social structure, based mainly on the nuclear family, but also included various combinations of other members, such as extended family members, household slaves, and freed slaves. Ancient Romans had different names to describe their concepts of family, such as, "familia" to describe the nuclear family and "domus" which would have included all the inhabitants of the household. The types of interactions between the different members of the family were dictated by the perceived social roles each member played. An ancient Roman family's structure was constantly changing as a result of the low life expectancy and through marriage, divorce, and adoption.

== Fathers ==
Ancient Romans placed the father at the head of the family. One definition of the term familia translates to, "the group of people who descend from the same pater," where pater means "father". From this definition, a father and all his children are part of his familia, as are the children of his sons. The children of his daughters, however, would become part of their father's familia. At the head of the entire familia was the pater familias. The pater familias was the oldest living male of the family. If he had living sons, even grown men with their own families, those sons would still be under the power of the pater familias.

In Ancient Rome, fathers were endowed with nearly limitless power over their family, especially their children. This patria potestas, or "the father's power" gave him legal rights over his children until he died or his children were emancipated. These powers included the right to arrange marriages or force divorce, expose a new born child if he did not want him/her, and even disown, sell, or kill his child. Even though a father had these legal rights, it did not mean these acts were common. Fathers wanted their children as heirs for the continuation of their bloodlines. Ancient Romans believed the patria potestas was first dictated by Romulus, the founder and first king of Rome. Legally, if a child did not share the father's citizenship, he or she was not under his patria potestas.

== Mothers ==
A woman in Ancient Rome was under the social expectation to become a wife and mother. Despite the importance of the mother in the family structure as the bearer of the children, she had no legal control over her children. Examples of mother-child relationships in ancient sources, if discussed at all, focus on describing her as the idealized Roman matrona. A Roman matrona was a strong, virtuous woman dedicated to the political advancement of her family. Marcus Aurelius provides a rare insight into the affectionate relationship between mother and son in a letter describing an afternoon spent with his mother playfully arguing and gossiping. The lack of literary discussion may have resulted because so many children never knew their mothers, who often died in childbirth. It was also the case that young children often had more contact with their wet nurse or pedagogue than their mother.

== Children ==
=== Starting a family ===
The nuclear family of father, mother, and children was essential to the Ancient Roman family structure. Although mothers gave birth to many children, the size of a Roman family remained relatively small because of the high infant and child mortality rate. Twenty-five percent of infants died within their first year, while another 25% died before their tenth birthday. Such a high rate meant women had to bear multiple children because many would not make it to adulthood. However, for couples who did not want to become pregnant, there were forms of contraception available to them, as well as abortion.

=== Life course ===
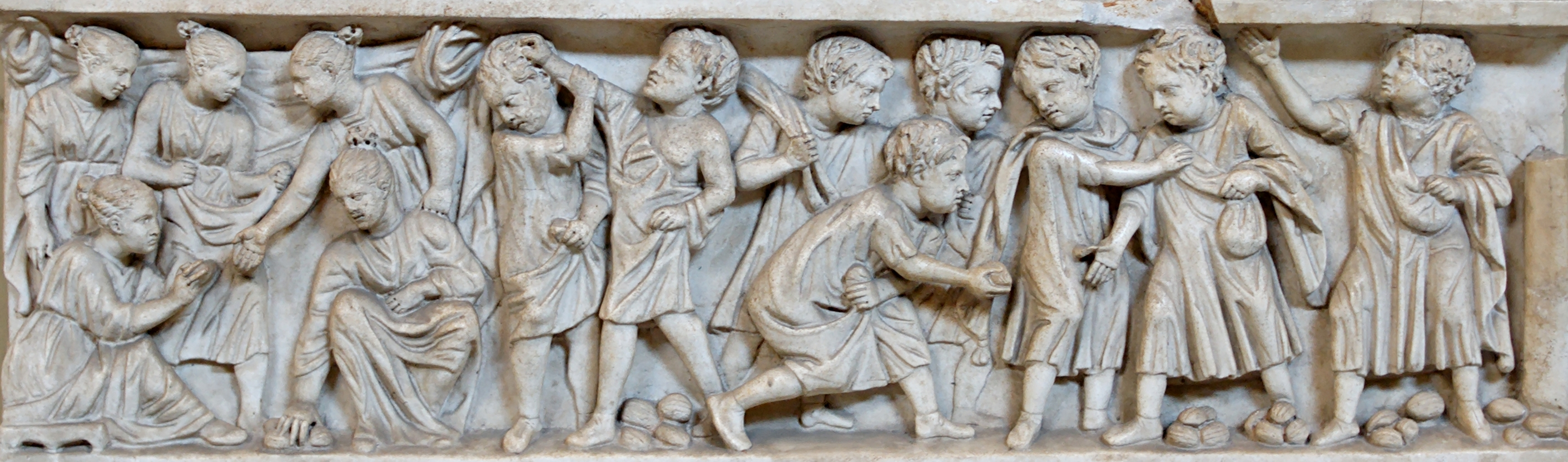
Sarcophagus depicting children at play

In infancy, a new born was either accepted into the family by his/her father in a ritual called tollere liberum or the child was exposed by the father, often without the consent of the mother. Exposure differed from infanticide and the abandoned child was often taken and raised by someone else. A child was considered an infant until he/she was seven years old. At this time, boys would begin their education and be introduced to public life. Girls remained in the household to learn the skills they would need as wives and mothers. Legally, a girl was considered a child until she was twelve years old and a boy until he was fourteen years old. Young girls were often engaged at twelve years old and married at thirteen to a man chosen by her father. Males transitioned to adulthood during the toga virilis ceremony when they received the white toga worn by adults. Childhood ended for women once they were married, but they were still considered childlike because of their weaker dispositions compared to men.

=== Wet nurses and pedagogues ===
Within the household, infants and children would have interacted with servants and household slaves. During infancy, babies were often nursed and cared for by wet nurses, or nutrix. Nurses were used by families of every social level and were often employed when the mother had died from childbirth, was unable to produce milk, wanted to become pregnant again quickly or was ill. A nurse, besides having a moral character, was expected to speak properly because her close interaction with her charge was highly influential to the child's development.

Pedagogues, or male tutors, were minders for both male and female children. They could be of servile or free status and were responsible for teaching the children proper etiquette and life skills. Pedagogues were also chaperons and tutors. Similarly to wet nurses, pedagogues were employed by families of all social classes.

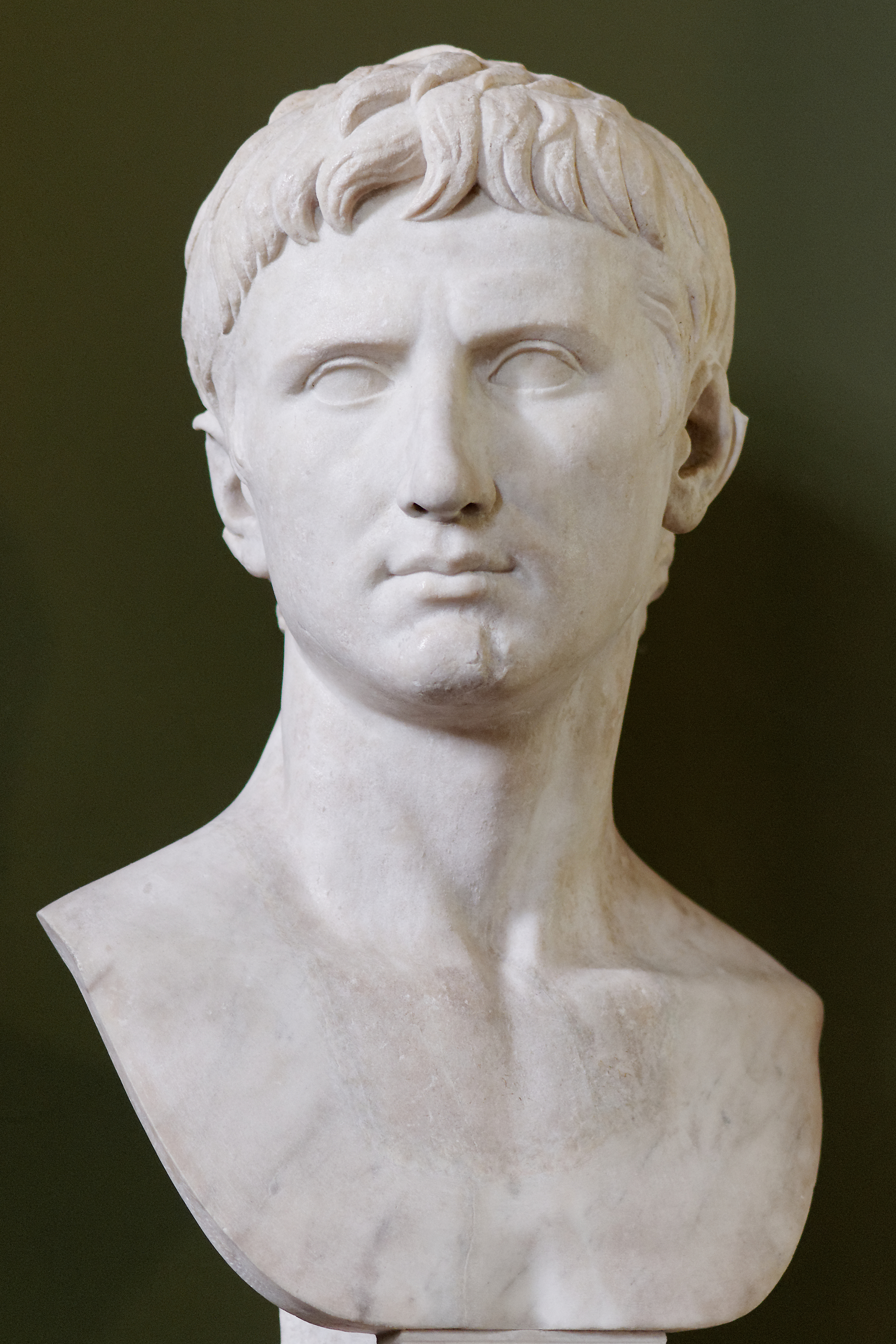
Augustus, possibly the most famous example of adoption in Ancient Rome

=== Adoption ===
Since the mortality rate of children in Ancient Rome was so high, many parents needed to adopt. This was also common if parents were unable to have children. Adoption normally occurred because of the need to have heirs to continue the family name. Most often a nephew or a grandson was adopted if the couple itself did not have a son. This was particularly prominent among the Roman emperors. Julius Caesar, for example, adopted his grandnephew Gaius Octavius (later known as Emperor Augustus) because he had no sons to succeed him. In some instances, masters would free their slave in order to officially adopt him into the family. By doing so, the slave could take on the family name and become an heir.

== Elderly ==
The average life expectancy in Ancient Rome at birth was 27 years old. Early deaths in women were common because of the dangers of childbirth and men often died on the battlefield. Those who lived to an elderly age expected their children to take care of them. In the second century AD, laws were passed stating a son should care for his elderly father; however, there was no compulsory obligation. Children cared for their elderly parents because of their belief in pietas, or a sense duty to their parents and the gods. A mythological example of pietas comes from the story of Aeneas, who carried his elderly father out of the burning city of Troy following the Trojan War.

== Slaves ==
The ancient Roman definition of domus consisted of everyone living in the household, which included slaves. Slaves were a constant presence in a Roman family. A significant example were the wet nurses and pedagogues who cared for and raised the children. Upper class Roman families often included space for their slaves in the family burial site and in exchange the slaves ensured their master received proper burial rites when he died. It was common for slaves to be manumitted, or freed, by their master and become his dependents as freedmen. It was up to the master to free a slave.

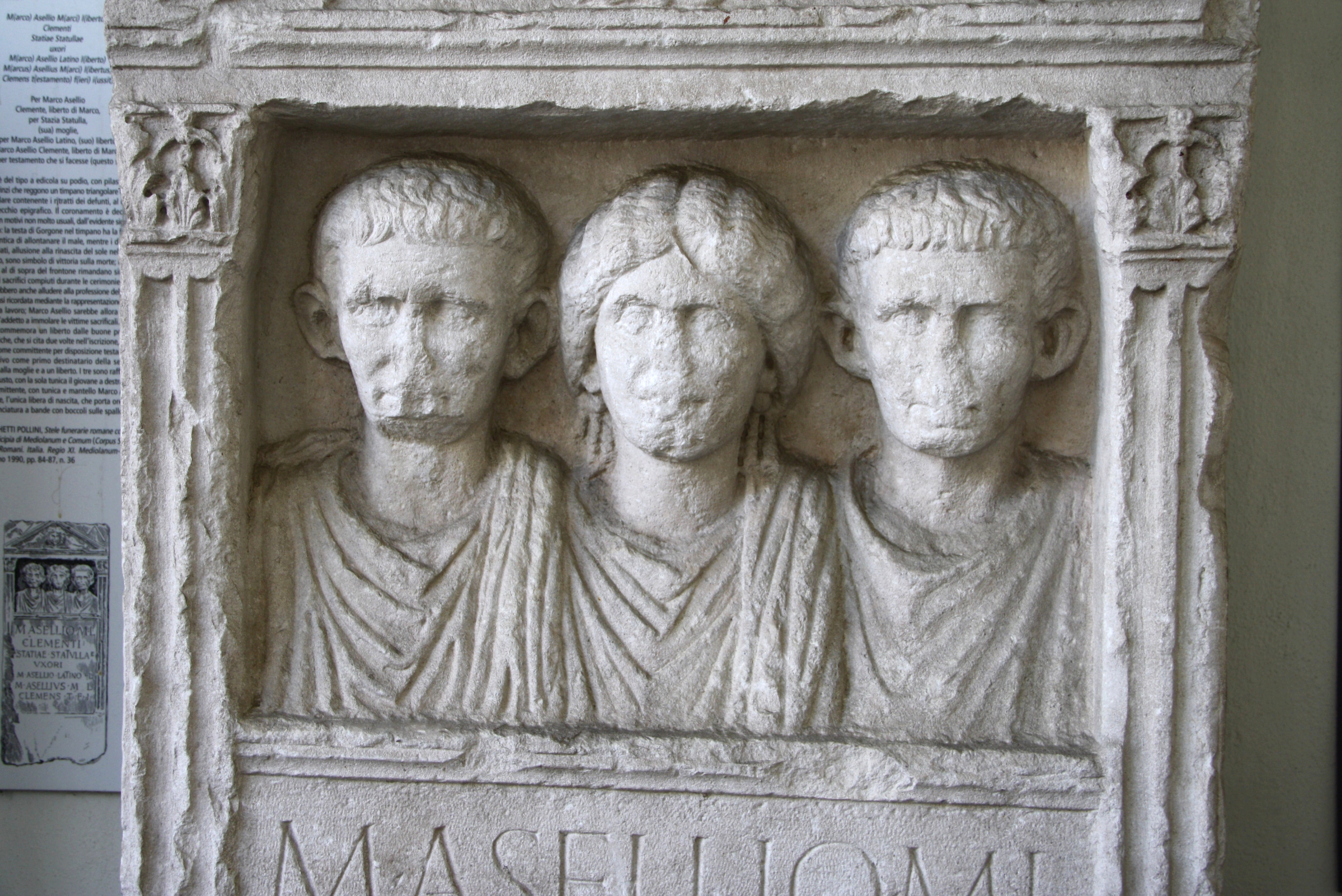
Funerary stele for the freedman Marcus Asellius Clemens, his wife, and their freedman

=== Freedpersons ===
Freedpersons, or liberti, were ex-slaves who were freed. Although free, many liberti continued to work for their previous master. When freed, liberti took on the name of their master, thereby continuing the family name. By taking their master's name, liberti were considered part of the familia, not just the domus. Like slaves, freedmen and freedwomen, with their families, were provided burial space with the familia.

== Marriage ==
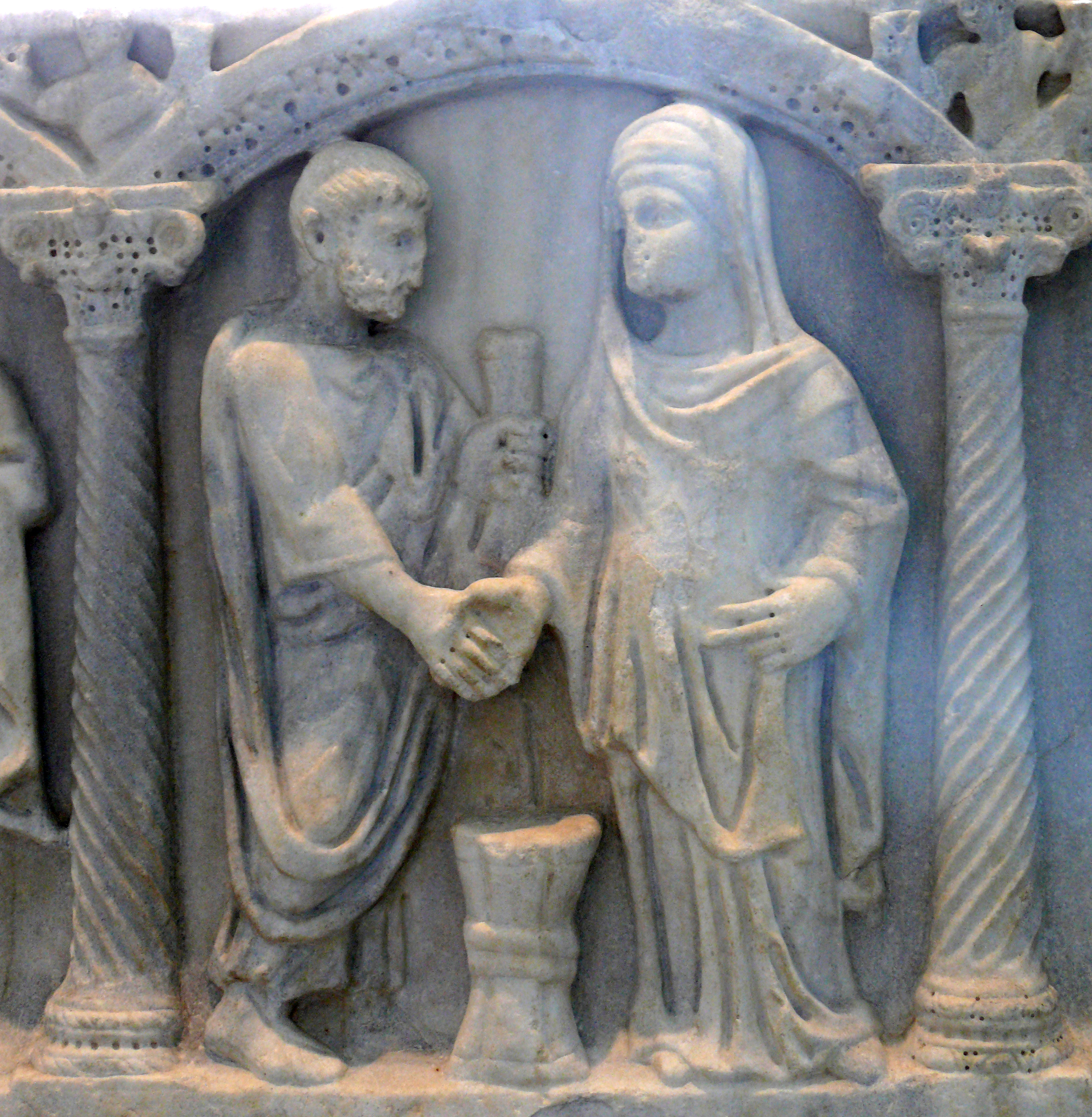
Roman marriage vows

The beginnings of a new Roman family began with marriage. Marriage was a means to provide sons to serve Rome. Women were married young, normally to men much older than themselves. These girls in their late teens may have already been married once before. Marriages were arranged by family members, normally the father, especially in the upper classes where marriages created political alliances. Marriage, and even divorce, did not have to be ratified by the state. A simple agreement between both parties was the only necessity. A marriage, for the upper classes, consisted of a wedding procession, where the woman was carried from her old home to the home of her new husband, accompanied by people singing wedding songs. Once married, the wife became a part of her husband's family and gained the title of materfamilias, or "mother of a household". A wife held the same property rights as a daughter and, therefore, could not receive her husband's property until his death. Once a wife, a woman would quickly also become a mother. Society taught women that their most valuable contribution to Rome was to give birth to many sons.

=== Divorce and remarriage ===
Divorce and remarriage were common in Roman society. Since so many marriages were arranged, the couple did not necessarily expect romance, but did hope to live in harmony, or concordia. If a marriage did not work out, divorce was as easily obtained as the marriage had been because the state did not need to ratify either. However, it was common to consult advice from close family or friends before getting a divorce. Both the man and the woman could request a divorce. The divorce procedure usually contained a verbal formula, in which the parties confirmed the end of the marriage. A father could force his child to get a divorce through his patria potestas, even if the marriage was happy. Divorce became increasingly common in the upper classes by the end of the Republic and the beginning of the Imperial periods because so many marriages were based on politics. If a man lost favor politically, a wife might divorce him to protect her family's reputation. In a divorce, the woman's family would usually ask the husband to return her dowry. This was possible only if the wife was innocent of any offense. If her husband divorced her because of a transgression like adultery or failure to perform her duties in the home, a wife could not have her dowry returned.

Remarriages were a result not only of divorce, but also of the high mortality rate in ancient Rome. A husband could remarry if his wife died in childbirth, a wife could remarry if her husband died at war, and either could remarry if the other died from disease, an accident, or old age. Divorce and remarriage could greatly alter the family structure by creating blended families. Step parents and step siblings were often added to the family. When a man remarried his children lived in his new household and their mother, if still alive, would rarely see them again.

=== Adultery ===
Both men and women had affairs in ancient Rome. The difference was it was socially acceptable for a husband to have an affair with a slave or a lower-class woman. It was never acceptable for a wife to have an affair with anyone. She was expected to remain faithful to her husband, even if she knew he was having an affair. Although women had affairs, it is hard to determine how common the practice was. The only exception for a man was he was not supposed to have a relationship with another upper class, married woman. However, during the Imperial period, it became more common for men to have affairs with upper-class women. Some literature from ancient Rome even gave advice on the best location to meet a mistress. In Ovid's poem, The Art of Love, he describes meeting women at a public location, like the circus or a horse race, to avoid detection. Because married couples had separate bedrooms, it was easy for a man to have an affair, but a woman was closely monitored by the household staff, which made having an affair within her own home almost impossible. If a cheating wife was caught by her husband with her lover, her husband had the legal right to kill the adulterer and immediately divorce his wife.

== Kinship terms ==
The kinship terms in the Latin language follow the Sudanese kinship system. Latin has a word for every role in the system. The terminology used by anthropologists when analyzing kinship in cultures is often derived from Latin (words like amitalocality, patrilineal).

== See also ==
- Family
- Marriage
