= Turms =

Etruscan messenger god, equivalent of Mercury and Hermes

- Messenger of the gods, especially Tinia; psychopomp
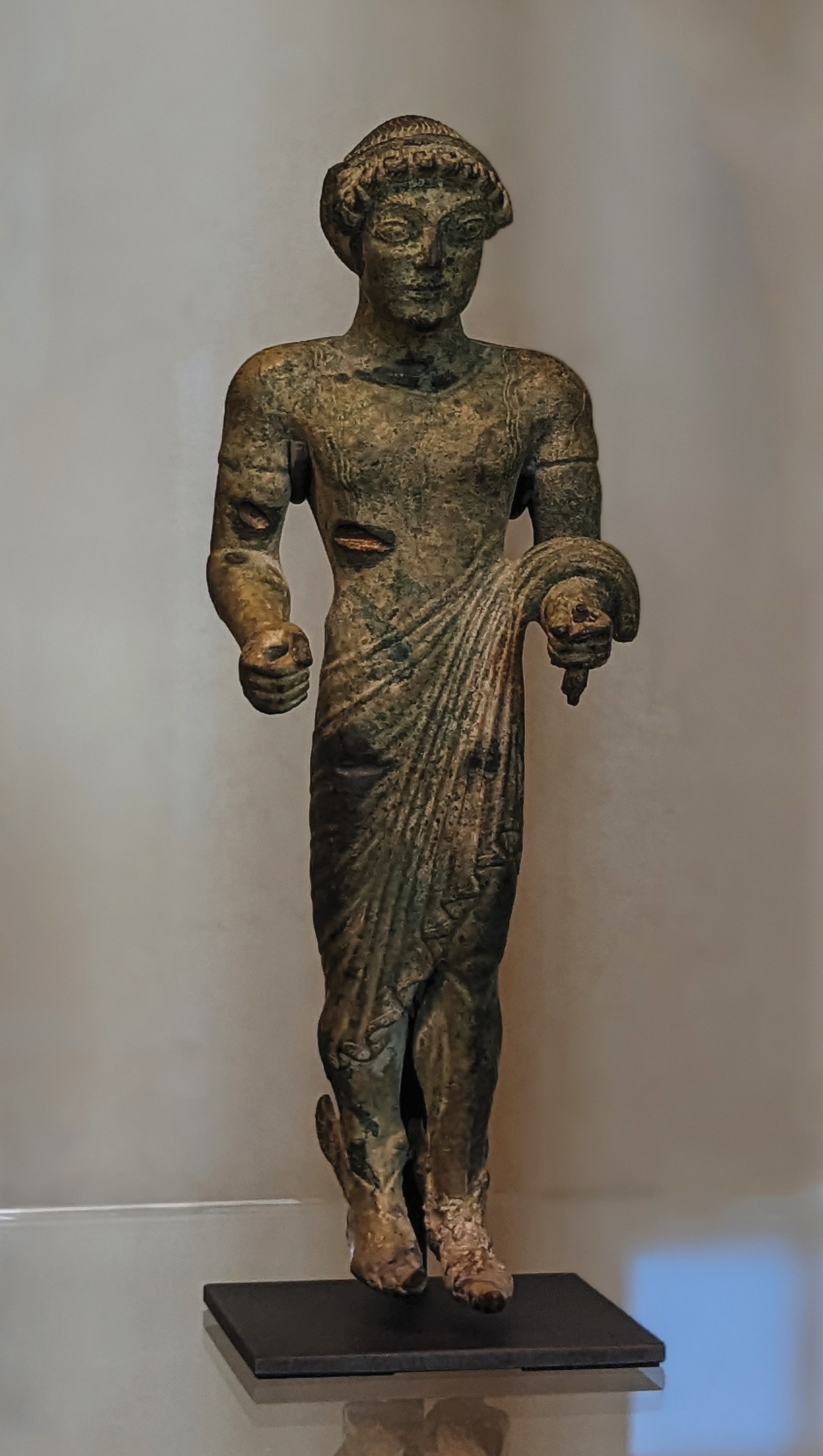
- An incomplete statuette of Turms at the Louvre
- Etruscan alphabet: 𐌕𐌖𐌓𐌌𐌑
- Ethnic group: Etruscans

Equivalents
- Greek: Hermes
- Roman: Mercury

Populonia, 5 asses (?)
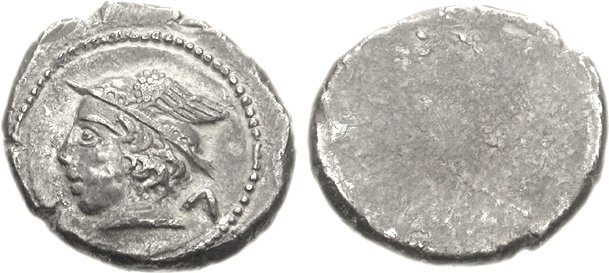
First side of the image: Turms with winged petasos; at right Λ, mark of value.
Second side of the image: Blank.
AR 3.30 g (Etruscan coins)

In Etruscan religion, Turms (usually written as 𐌕𐌖𐌓𐌌𐌑 Turmś in the Etruscan alphabet) was the equivalent of Roman Mercury and Greek Hermes, both gods of trade and the messenger god between people and gods. He was depicted with the same distinctive attributes as Hermes and Mercury: a caduceus, a petasos (often winged), and/or winged sandals. He is portrayed as a messenger of the gods, particularly Tinia (Jupiter), although he is also thought to be ‘at the service’ (ministerium) of other deities.

Etruscan artwork often depicts Turms in his role as psychopomp, conducting the soul into the afterlife. In this capacity he is sometimes shown on Etruscan sarcophagi—in one case side by side with Charun and Cerberus. In another depiction, in which the god is labelled as 𐌕𐌖𐌓𐌌𐌑 𐌀𐌉𐌕𐌀𐌑 Turmś Aitaś or ‘Turms of Hades’, he brings the shade of Tiresias to consult with Odysseus in the underworld. Turms also appears in images depicting the Judgement of Paris, as well as in scenes with Hercle (Heracles) or Perseus.

The name Turms is of distinctively Etruscan origin, like that of Fufluns but in contrast to deities such as Hercle and Apulu (Apollo), whose names were borrowed from Greek.

Turms is known more from decoration on everyday objects, such as mirrors, than from cult images, although one dedication has been taken to indicate the existence of a temple of Turms at Cortona.

Bernard Combet-Farnoux interprets comments by Servius and Macrobius as indicating that “Hermes-Turms” had the epithet Camillus, meaning ‘servant’ (i.e. of the other deities). A scholium on Callimachus adds that “Cadmilos is Hermes in Tyrrhenia”; Combet-Farnoux considers Camillus and Cadmilos to be variants of the same name.
