= Gbadu =

Goddess in Dahomey mythology

Gbadu is a god in the Dahomey mythology of the Fon people, who are now based in Benin, Nigeria, and Togo. She is one of Mawu-Lisa’s daughters, and just like her parents, consists of both a female and male aspect though she is mostly referred to with female pronouns. Gbadu is described as the female counterpart to Fa.

According to certain accounts, Gbadu is considered the goddess of fate in Dahomey mythology. Her myths are heavily associated with the Ifa or Fa divination, and according to Dahomean folklore, her offspring were responsible for teaching and spreading the practice among humans.

== Representation ==
Since her birth, Gbadu was instructed by Mawu to sit on top of a palm tree and watch over the Three Kingdoms: The Kingdom of the Earth, the Kingdom of the Sky, and the Kingdom of the Sea. According to certain accounts, the name of this palm tree is “Fa”. Gbadu has sixteen eyes surrounding her head, which will later signify her abilities to see the future. However, these eyes remain closed to what is present before her, and if she wishes to open even one of her eyes, she must ask for Legba’s assistance.

== Relationship with other Dahomey gods ==
=== Legba ===
Just like Gbadu, Legba is one of Mawu-Lisa’s children. Yet, at the same time, Gbadu is also one of Legba’s lovers—and so is Gbadu’s daughter, Minona. Legba’s role in Gbadu’s mythos cast him in a central position since without him, Gbadu is unable to open her eyes to see her surroundings. Since Gbadu’s ability to speak is also limited in her role as overseer of the Three Kingdoms, Legba can only communicate with Gbadu through the use of palm kernels.

=== Mawu ===
Gbadu is the daughter of Mawu and was born after the twins Agbè and Naetè. Although Legba often intermediates the communication between Mawu and Gbadu, the former has directly interacted with Gbadu, most notably during the events where Legba was discovered to have engaged in sexual intercourse with both Gbadu and her daughter Minona. As a result of this incident, Mawu punished Legba with a form of priapism that will never reach climax.

== Myth ==
=== The origins of Fa divination ===
It is said that one day, Legba informed Mawu that a war is about to break out in the Three Kingdoms, leading to their destruction. To prevent the war from taking place, Mawu told Legba to find three men who can teach the people living in these kingdoms “the alphabet of Mawu”, which would allow them to use Fa divination to guide their actions in life.

Prior to this, Mawu had taught Gbadu how to understand “the alphabet of Mawu”, which in turn she taught to her children; her two daughters, which included Minona, and her six sons, Aovi, Abi, Duwo, Kiti, Agbanukwè, and Zosẽ. And so, when Mawu asked Legba to send three men to earth to teach them his alphabet, Legba chose to send Gbadu's sons: Duwo, Kiti, and Zosẽ.

Before Gbadu's sons set down to earth, Mawu gave Gbadu the keys to the future—thus affirming her position as the goddess of fate—which are connected to her eyes. Each of her eyes represents a different meaning to a person's future. To access this knowledge, just like Legba, humans must use palm kernels to communicate to Gbadu. This knowledge is then organized in the teachings of Fa divination, which Duwo, Kiti, and Zosẽ set out to teach to humanity.

== See also ==
- Dahomean religion
- List of African mythological figures
- Papa Legba
