= Amphidromia =

Ceremonial feast

The Amphidromia (Ancient Greek: τὰ Ἀμφιδρόμια, lit. 'two-way', [ta ampʰidrǒmia]), in ancient Greece, was a ceremonial feast celebrated on the fifth or seventh day after the birth of a child.

It was a family festival of the Athenians, at which the newly born child was introduced into the family, and children of poorer families received their names. Wealthier families held a naming ceremony for their children on the tenth day called dekate. This ceremony, unlike the Amphidromia, was open to the public by invitation. No particular day was fixed for this solemnity; but it did not take place very soon after the birth of the child, for it was believed that most children died before the seventh day, and the solemnity was therefore generally deferred till after that period, that there might be at least some probability of the child remaining alive.

According to Suidas, the festival was held on the fifth day, when the women who had lent their assistance at the birth washed their hands, but this purification preceded the real solemnity. The friends and relations of the parents were invited to the festival of the amphidromia, which was held in the evening, and they generally appeared with presents, among which are mentioned the cuttlefish and the marine polyp. The house was decorated on the outside with olive branches if the child was a boy, or with garlands of wool if the child was a girl; and a repast was prepared.

The child was then carried round the fire by the nurse, and thus, as it were, presented to the gods of the house and to the family, and at the same time received its name, to which the guests were witnesses. The carrying of the child round the hearth was the principal part of the solemnity, from which its name was derived. But the Scholiast on Aristophanes (Lysistr. 758) derives its name from the fact that the guests, whilst the name was given to the child, walked or danced around it.

This festival is sometimes called from the day on which it took place.

== See also ==
- Dies lustricus

== Sources ==
- Smith, William. Dictionary of Greek and Roman Antiquities. 1870.
- Golden, Mark. "Children and Childhood in Classical Athens." Johns Hopkins press. 1990
- Desiderius Erasmus, Adagiorum chiliades, Adagium IV ii 33: Amphidromiam agis (You are celebrating the Amphidromia)
- Alexander, Timothy Jay (2007). A Beginner's Guide to Hellenismos. Lulu Press, Inc. ISBN 978-1-4303-2456-0.
