= Marco Bigio =

Italian painter (1552–1606)

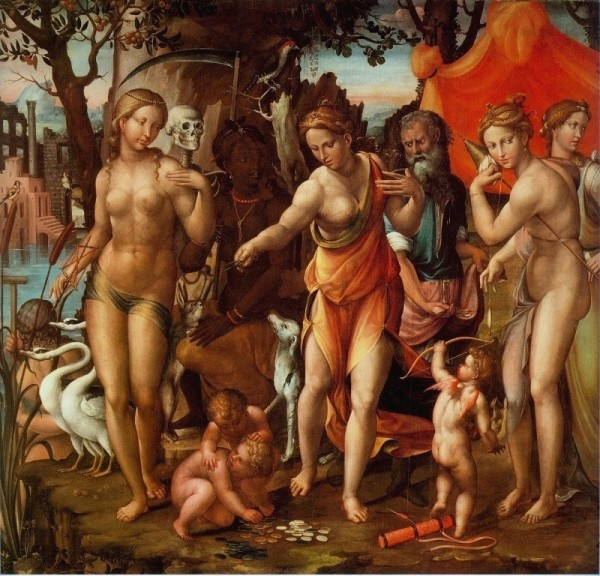
The Three Parcae (1540-1550)

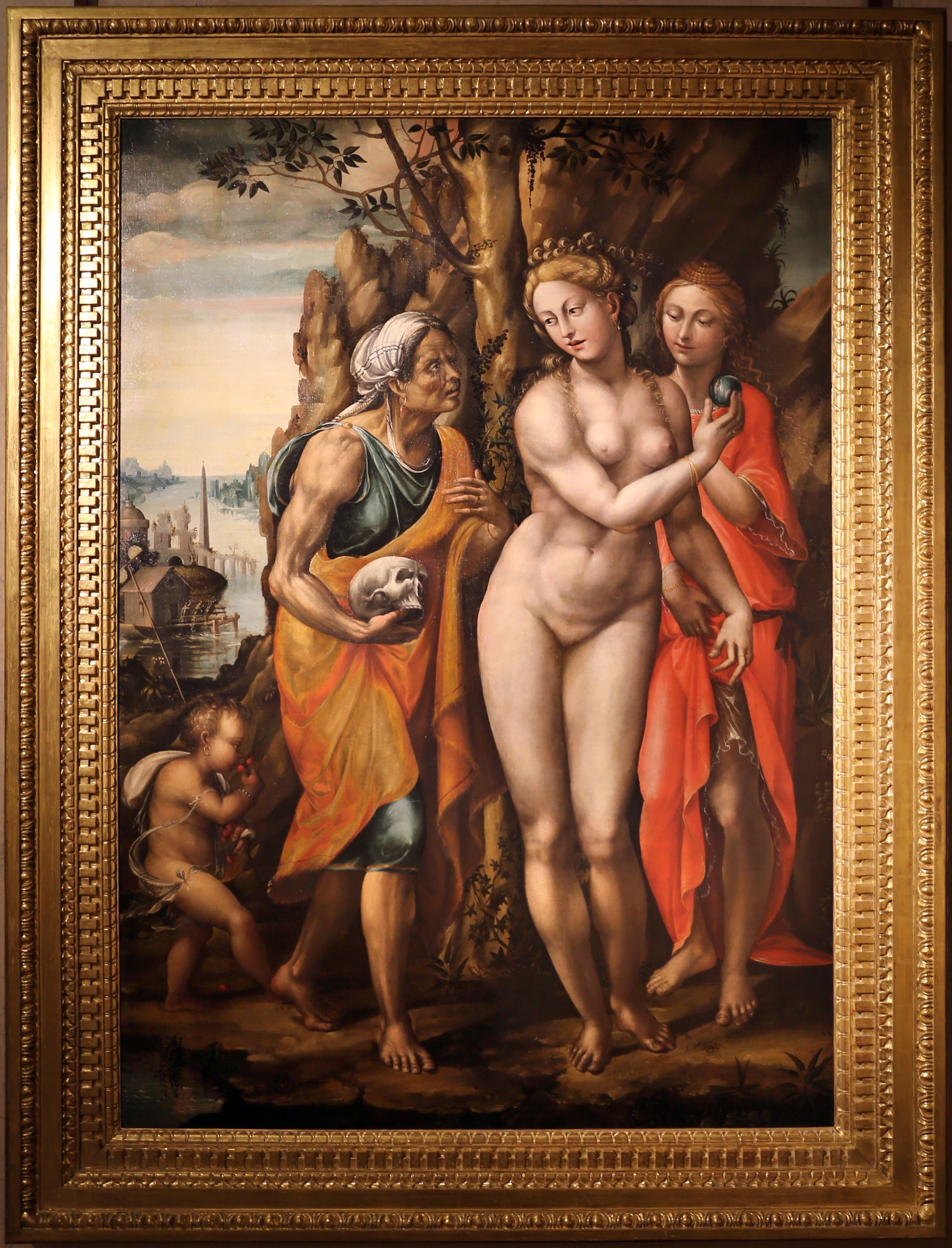
Three ages of Woman, Pinacoteca da Casa Ciani, Siena.

Marco Bigio, also known as Giorgio da Siena) (active 1523 to 1550) was an Italian painter of the Renaissance period, active mainly in Siena.

== Biography ==
Little is known about the life of the painter. He is putatively a pupil of Sodoma, and an attributed work in the Palazzo Barberini Gallery, has been attributed to one or both of these artists. Filippo Boni indicates that his style resembles that of Antonio Maria Lari (Il Tozzo).

Among the works attributed to Bigio are:

- Holy Family with young St John the Baptist (1540), 49 × 33 cm,
- The Three Parcae of Fates (1540–1550), 200 × 212, Galleria Nazionale d'Arte Antica in Palazzo Barberini, Rome
- Three Ages of Woman
- Madonna and Child and Magdalen, 80 cm,
- Magdalen, 133,5 × 97 cm,
- Magdalen in prayer with a seascape, 112 × 93,5 cm,
- Madonna and Child, St John and Angels, tempera, 66 × 66 cm.
