= Decima (mythology) =

Goddess that was one of the Roman Fates

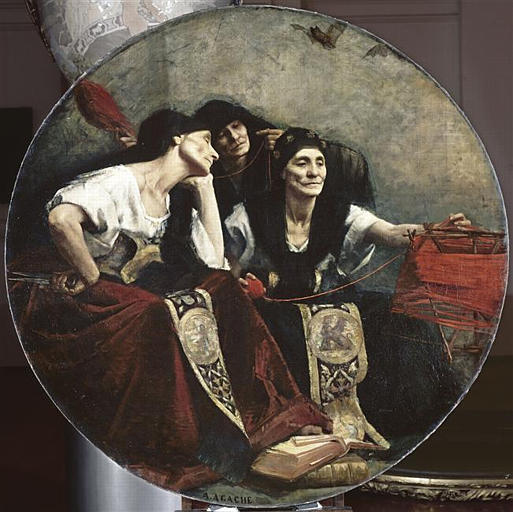
Decima on the right measuring the thread of life near the other Parcae

Decima was one of the three Parcae (known in English as the Fates) in Roman mythology. The Parcae goddess Nona was responsible for pregnancy; Decima was responsible for measuring a person's lifespan; and Morta was charged with overseeing death. They distributed to mankind all the good and bad things in life, and according to some classical writings even Jupiter had to bend to their will. Decima measured the thread of life with her rod, like her Greek equivalent Lachesis. In some accounts, her mother was Nox the goddess of night and her father was Erebus, the god of darkness; while in other accounts, her parents were Jupiter and Themis.

== See also ==
- Moirai
- Norns
