= Dies lustricus =

Ancient Roman naming ceremony

In ancient Rome the dies lustricus ("day of lustration" or "purification day") was a traditional naming ceremony in which an infant was purified and given a praenomen (given name). This occurred on the eighth day for girls and the ninth day for boys, a difference Plutarch explains by noting that "it is a fact that the female grows up, and attains maturity and perfection before the male." Until the umbilical cord fell off, typically on the seventh day, the baby was regarded as "more like a plant than an animal," as Plutarch expresses it. (Note: See also Aulus Gellius, Attic Nights 16.16, citing Varro in saying that in the womb children are more like trees than a human being.) The ceremony of the dies lustricus was thus postponed until the last tangible connection to the mother's body was dissolved and the child was seen "as no longer forming part of the mother, and in this way as possessing an independent existence which justified its receiving a name of its own and therefore a fate of its own." The day was celebrated with a family feast. The childhood goddess Nundina presided over the event, and the goddess Nona was supposed to determine a person's lifespan. Prior to the ceremony infants were not considered part of the household, even if their father had raised them up during a tollere liberum.

On the dies lustricus, the Fata Scribunda were invoked. The "Written Fates" probably refers to a ceremonial writing down of the child's new name, perhaps in a family chronicle. To the Romans, the giving of a name was as important as being born. The receiving of a praenomen inaugurated the child as an individual with its own fate. A child's name may have been decided on before hand in the preceding days. In rare instances children were given names before the ceremony or posthumously, for example one child named Simplicius is recorded to have died the same day as he was born, possibly only living an hour. Often when a boy was commemorated despite dying before their name giving they are recorded only with their family nomen and possibly a cognomen. In the past some historians such as Theodor Mommsen believed that all male infants who died before their naming day were given a pseudopraenomen "Pupus" (a pet name meaning "little boy") in place of an actual praenomen on inscriptions, but it has later been proven that Pupus was a genuine praenomen (although incredibly rare).

The day may also have been when the child received the bulla, the protective amulet that was put aside when a boy passed into adulthood. The practice was widespread in the Western Roman Empire into late antiquity. This tradition was familiar to Christians as well who seem to have incorporated parts of it into their own lives.

== See also ==
- Dies (deity), Roman goddess
