= Agyieus =

Ancient Greek mythological epithet

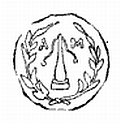
Illustration of a coin of Apollo Agyieus from Ambracia, depicting the conical representation of the god.

Agyieus (Ancient Greek: Ἀγυιεύς, romanized: Aguieus means 'he of the street') was an epithet of the Greek god Apollo describing him as the protector of the streets, public places, and the entrances to homes. As such he was worshiped at Acharnae, Mycenae, and at Tegea. The origin of the worship of Apollo Agyieus in the last of these places is related by Pausanias.

The cult of Apollo Agyieus was aniconic, and this facet of Apollo was worshiped in the form of a pointed column or obelisk, often kept by the front door of a private home, or in the open country, rather than in a temple. This symbol is similar to a sign like an edged cone found on the gate of a temple in the Hittitic city Boğazkale; an inscription names the god Apulunas. He was the protector of the gate. Hrozny derives the name from the Babylonian word abullu which means "gate ". The Greeks named him Agyieus, as the protector God who draws off evil. Some writers have held that the omphalos of the oracle at Delphi was a modified pillar of Agyieus. When standing before a house, the stone objects would be decorated with offerings of ribbon, or wreaths of myrtle or bay.
