= Semla (mythology) =

Etruscan goddess

Semla is the Etruscan equivalent for the Greek goddess Semele, daughter of the Boeotian hero Cadmus and mother of the Greek god of wine, Dionysus, by Zeus. Her name also is sometimes spelled Semia.

== Depictions ==
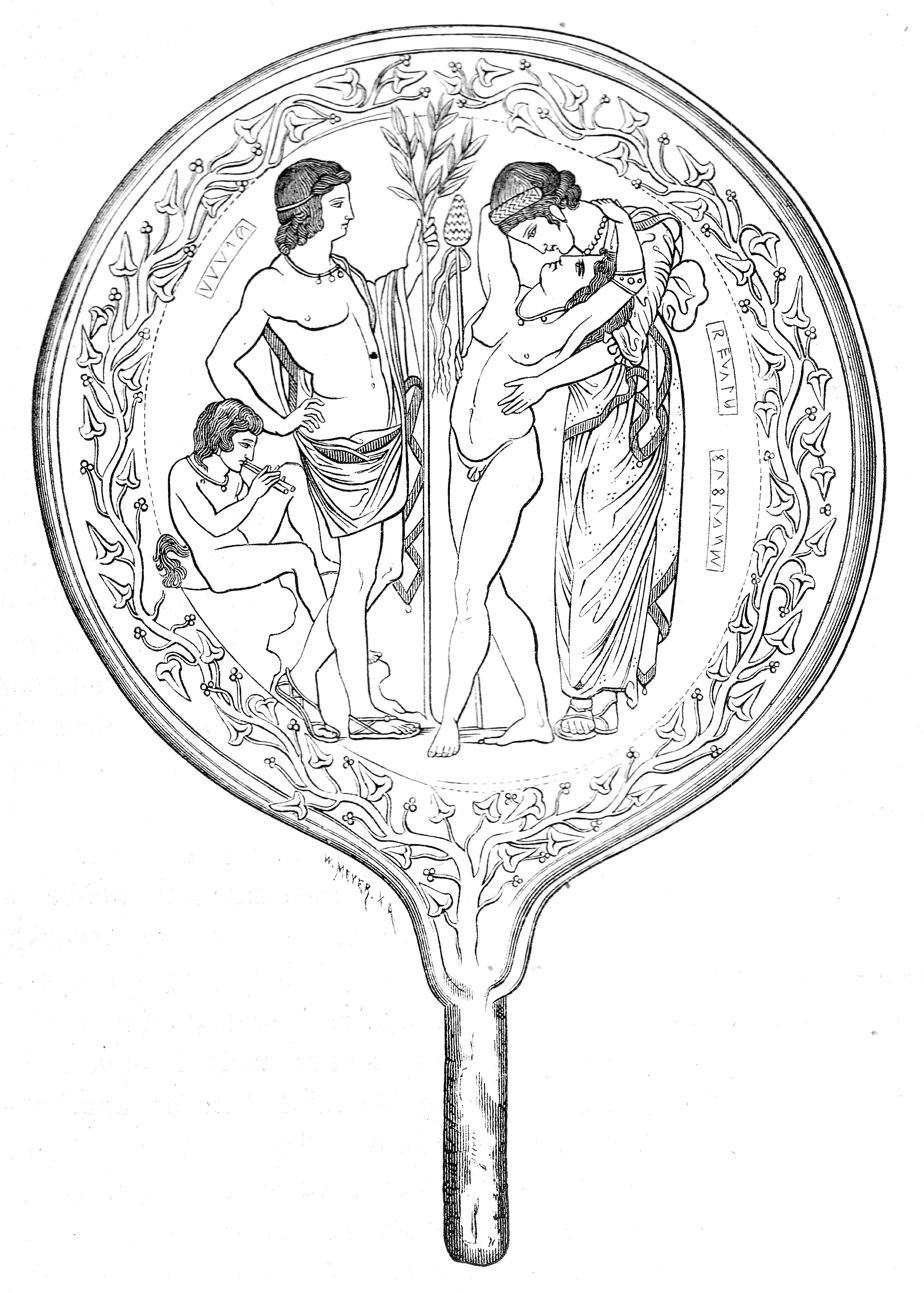
Drawing from this Etruscan bronze mirror showing Semla embracing the young Fufluns with Aplu looking on and a young satyr playing an aulos

An Etruscan bronze mirror from the 4th century BCE depicts a woman, labeled as Semla, holding a thyrsus and kissing the young Puphluns as he embraces her. The god Aplu (Apollo) stands by holding a laurel branch. A boy-silenus with a small horsetail plays an ancient Greek wind instrument, often depicted in art, known as an aulos.

== See also ==
- Etruscan mythology
