= Nona (mythology) =

Roman goddess of pregnancy

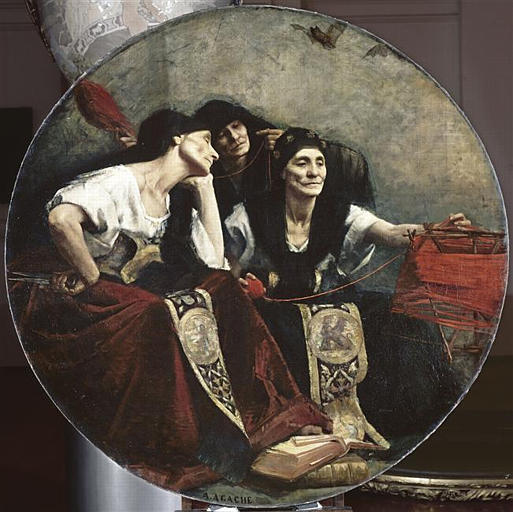
Les Parques ("The Parcæ"), Alfred Agache, c 1885

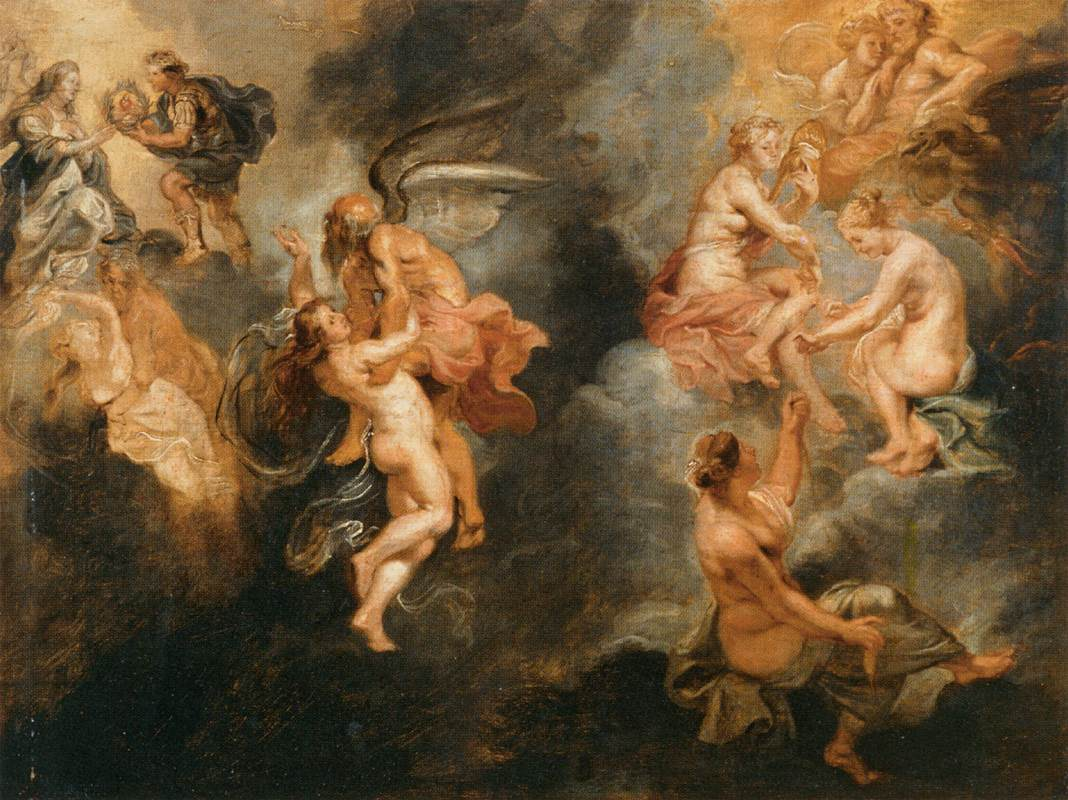
The Triumph of Truth (The Three Parcae Spinning the Fate of Marie de Medici) (1622–1625), by Peter Paul Rubens (1577–1640)

Nona was one of the Parcae, the three personifications of destiny in Roman mythology (the Moirai in Greek mythology and in Germanic mythology, the Norns), and the Roman goddess of pregnancy. The Roman equivalent of the Greek Clotho, she spun the thread of life from her distaff onto her spindle. Nona, whose name means "ninth", was called upon by pregnant women in their ninth month when the child was due to be born.

She, Decima and Morta together controlled the metaphorical thread of life.

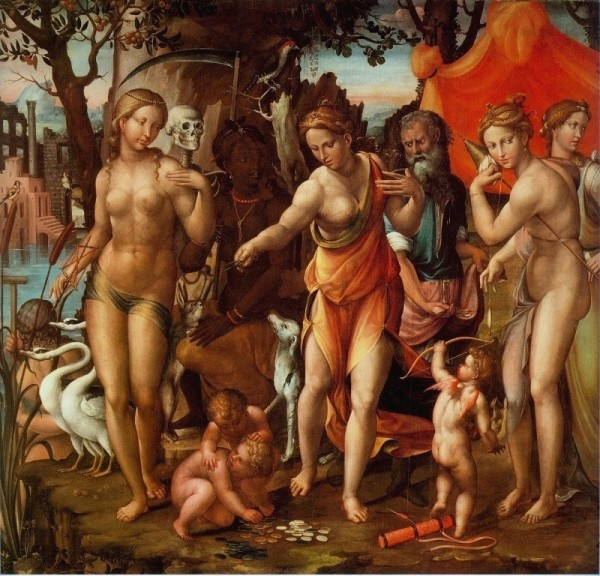
The Three Parcae (1540–1550), by Marco Bigio, in Villa Barberini, Rome
