= Fufluns =

Etruscan god of growth

- God of plant life, happiness, wine, health, and growth
- Other names: Puphluns; Fufluns Pachies / Pacha
- Etruscan: 𐌚𐌖𐌚𐌋𐌖𐌍𐌔 / 𐌐𐌖𐌘𐌋𐌖𐌍𐌔
- Venerated in: Etruscan religion
- Major cult centre: Populonia (Fufluna / Pupluna)
- Weapon: Thyrsus
- Animals: Satyrs (companions)
- Symbol: Thyrsus
- Attributes: Wine, vegetation, health, psychopomp functions
- Gender: Male
- Associated deities: Apulu, Catha, Semla

Genealogy
- Parents: Tinia and Semla
- Siblings: Apulu
- Consort: Areatha; sometimes associated with Semla

Equivalents
- Greek: Dionysos
- Roman: Liber

In Etruscan religion, Fufluns (Etruscan: 𐌚𐌖𐌚𐌋𐌖𐌍𐌔) or Puphluns (Etruscan: 𐌐𐌖𐌘𐌋𐌖𐌍𐌔) was a god of plant life, happiness, wine, health, and growth in all things. He is mentioned twice among the gods listed in the inscriptions of the Liver of Piacenza, being listed among the 16 gods that rule the Etruscan astrological houses. He is the 9th of those 16 gods. He is the son of Semla and the god Tinia. He was worshipped at Populonia (Etruscan Fufluna or Pupluna) and is the namesake of that town.

His Greek equivalent is Dionysos (Latin Dionysus), whereas his Roman equivalent is Liber. He was known as Fufluns Pachies in Vulci, with the second name being an Etruscan form of Bacchus. He was also given the cult name of Pacha in later periods.

== Iconography ==
Fufluns is usually depicted as a beardless youth, but is sometimes rarely shown as an older, bearded man. Fufluns was shown in art with the thyrsus, satyrs, maenads, and other apotropaic symbols.

Fufluns is associated with several other deities in art, including Apulu (Apollo) who is considered his brother and his mother Semla. In association with them, Fufluns was sometimes seen as a chthonic deity associated with the underworld and a psychopomp that guided and protected souls. Fufluns was additionally associated with a purely Etruscan goddess named Catha.

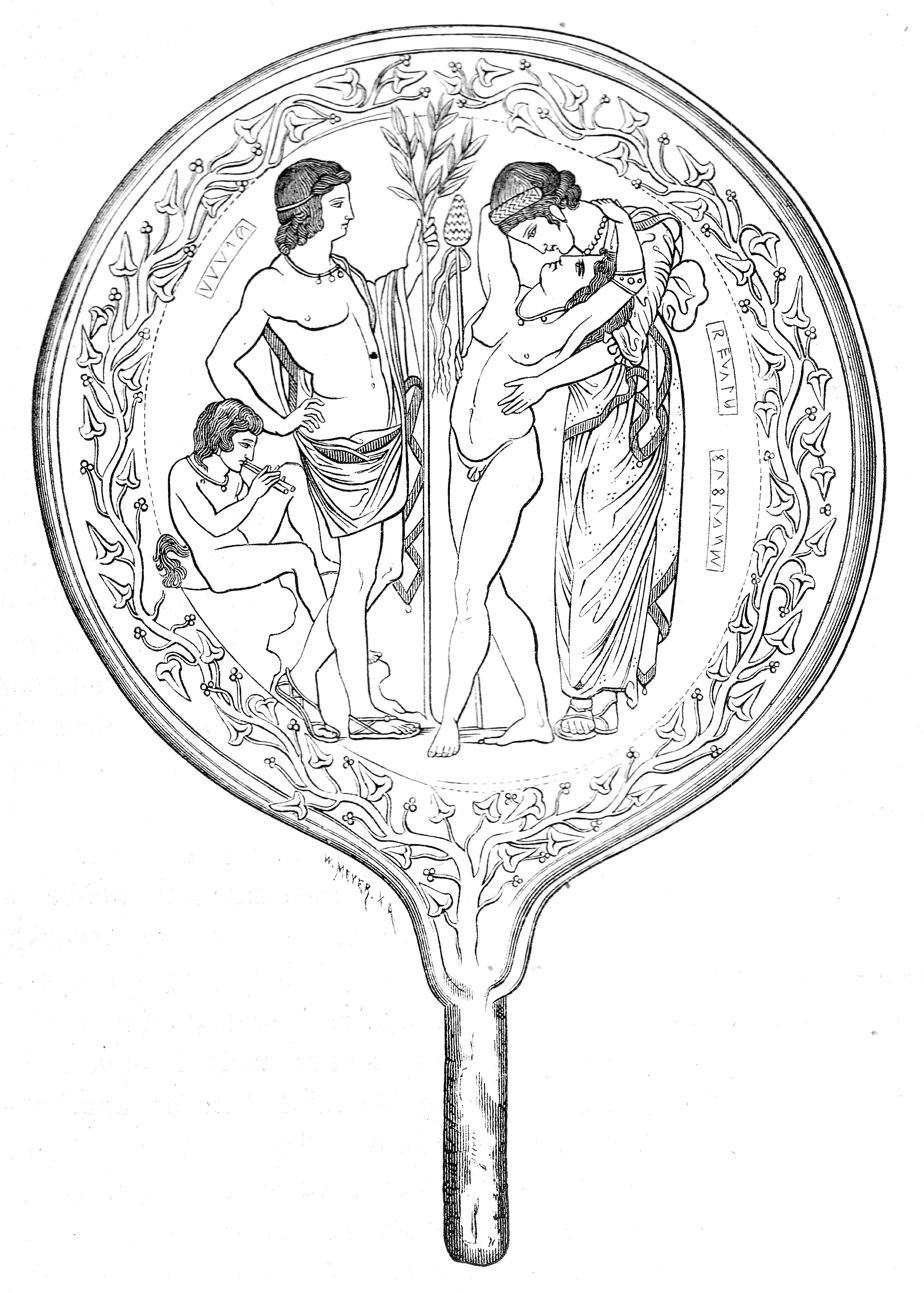
Depicting, from left to right; a satyr, Apulu, Fufluns and his mother Semla.

== Myths ==
Fufluns shares many myths with Dionysus, including the story of his birth, which parallels the story of Zeus and Semele. Like that myth, the pregnant Semla is killed by Tinia in the form of a lightning bolt, who then continues to bear Fufluns by sewing the infant into his thigh and later giving birth to him. However, Semla continues to appear in artwork in association with an adult Fufluns after her death, indicating either a resurrection or immortalization of his mother.

Additionally, Fufluns's connection to his mother is sometimes cast as romantic, as seen in artwork that shows them in an embrace used elsewhere in Etruscan artwork to indicate erotic entanglement.

Another depiction of a lost myth regarding Fufluns depicts his relationship with Areatha, the Etruscan form of Ariadne. The bronze mirror shows Fufluns and Areatha but also includes additional figures that are not part of the Greek version of the myth, namely Castur (the Etruscan Castor), a male figure called Eiasun (Jason) and a small winged figure identified as Aminth, who is attributed as the personification of love. The implications of the scene are based on a myth that is no longer recorded, but indicate some disagreement between Eiasun and Fufluns in which Areatha is involved. The myth of Fuflun and Areatha itself follows the traditional Greek myth, in which Areatha is abandoned by Theseus after helping him escape the labyrinth of Minos. Fufluns then finds Areatha and falls in love with her, and they later marry.
