= Morta (mythology) =

Goddess of death in Roman mythology

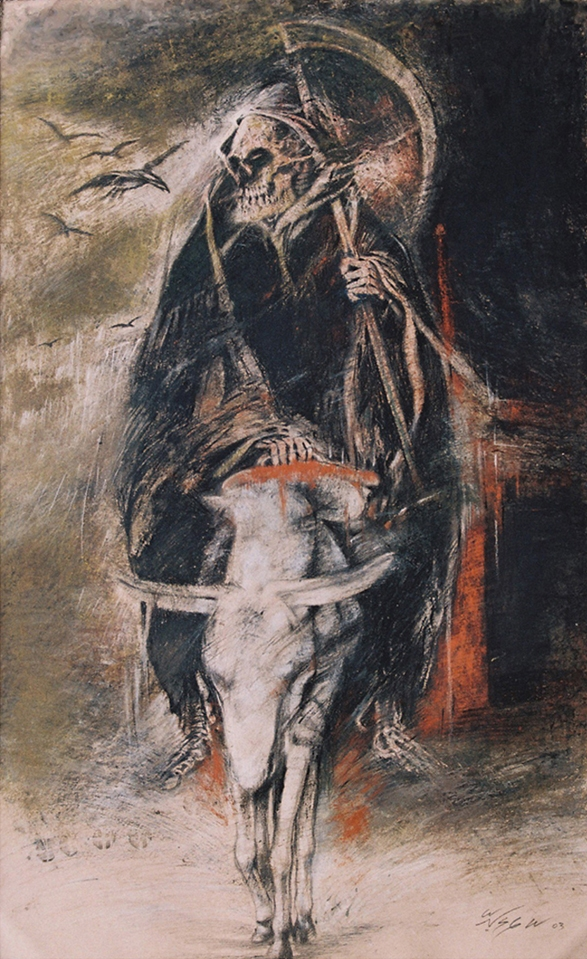
La Parca by Mexican artist Antonio García Vega

In Roman mythology, Morta was the goddess of death. She was believed to preside over infants who died.

Aulus Gellius understood her name to be the similar as Morea. Morta's name most likely meant "fate".
