= Lead Plaque of Magliano =

Disk with Etruscan inscription

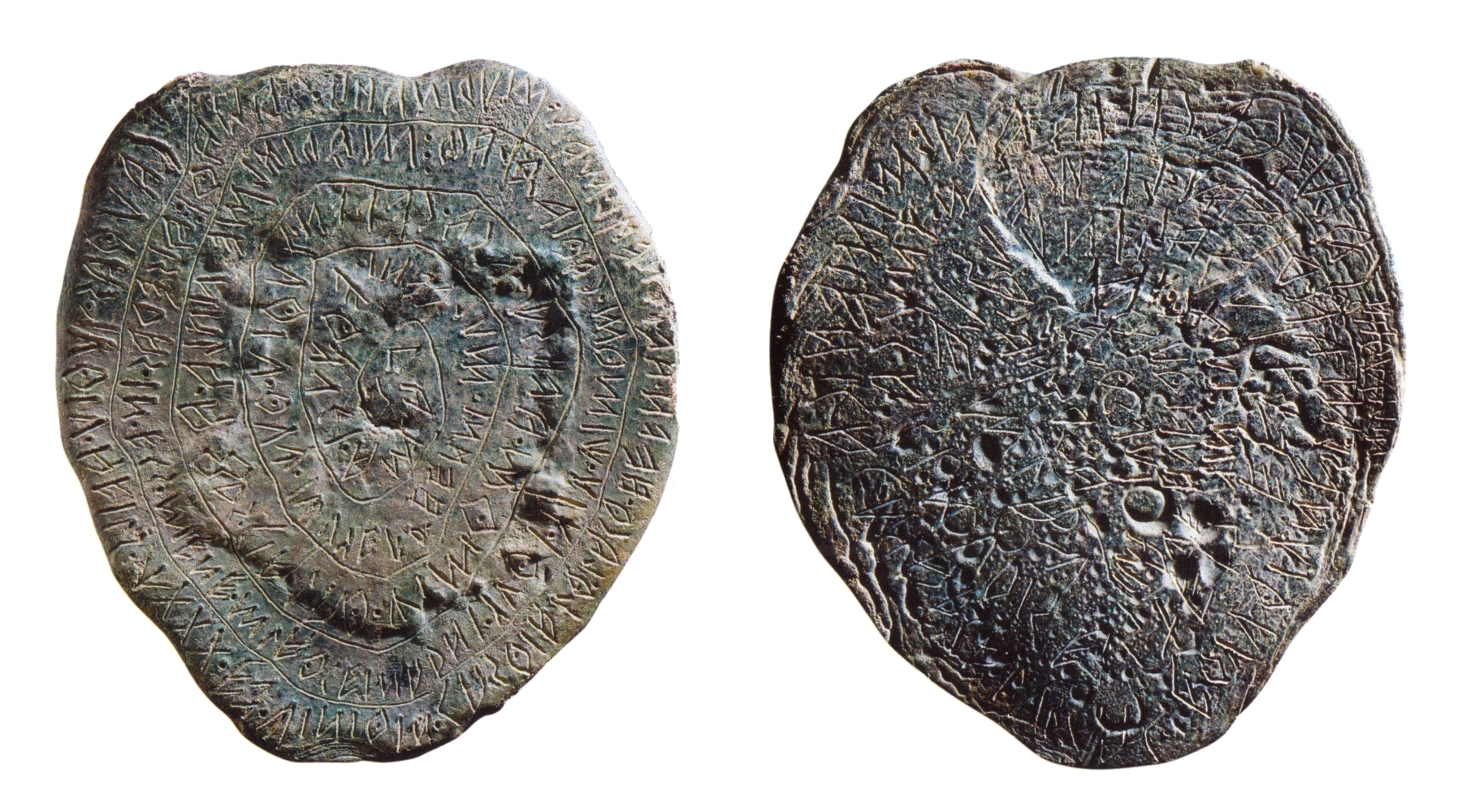
Lead plaque of Magliano, sides A and B

The Lead Plaque of Magliano (or Lead Plate of Magliano or Lead Disk; CIE 5237), which contains 73 words in the Etruscan language, seems to be a dedicatory text, including as it does many names of mostly underworld deities. It was found in 1882, and dates to the mid 5th century BC. It is now housed in the National Archaeological Museum in Florence.

== Description ==
The plaque weighs 191 grams and is curved in the shape of a lens. Its diameter is 7 cm at its narrowest point and 8 cm at its widest point. Only a few written monuments of Etruscan have survived on metal plates. The arrangement of the text is just as unusual as the shape and texture of the disk. The slab is inscribed with spiral Etruscan letters on both sides, reminiscent of the Phaistos Disc. The creation of the artifact is dated to around 450 BC. The lead plate was found in February 1882 in a field 2 km southeast of Magliano in the Albegna river valley, near the former monastery of Santa Maria in Borraccia.

== Content ==
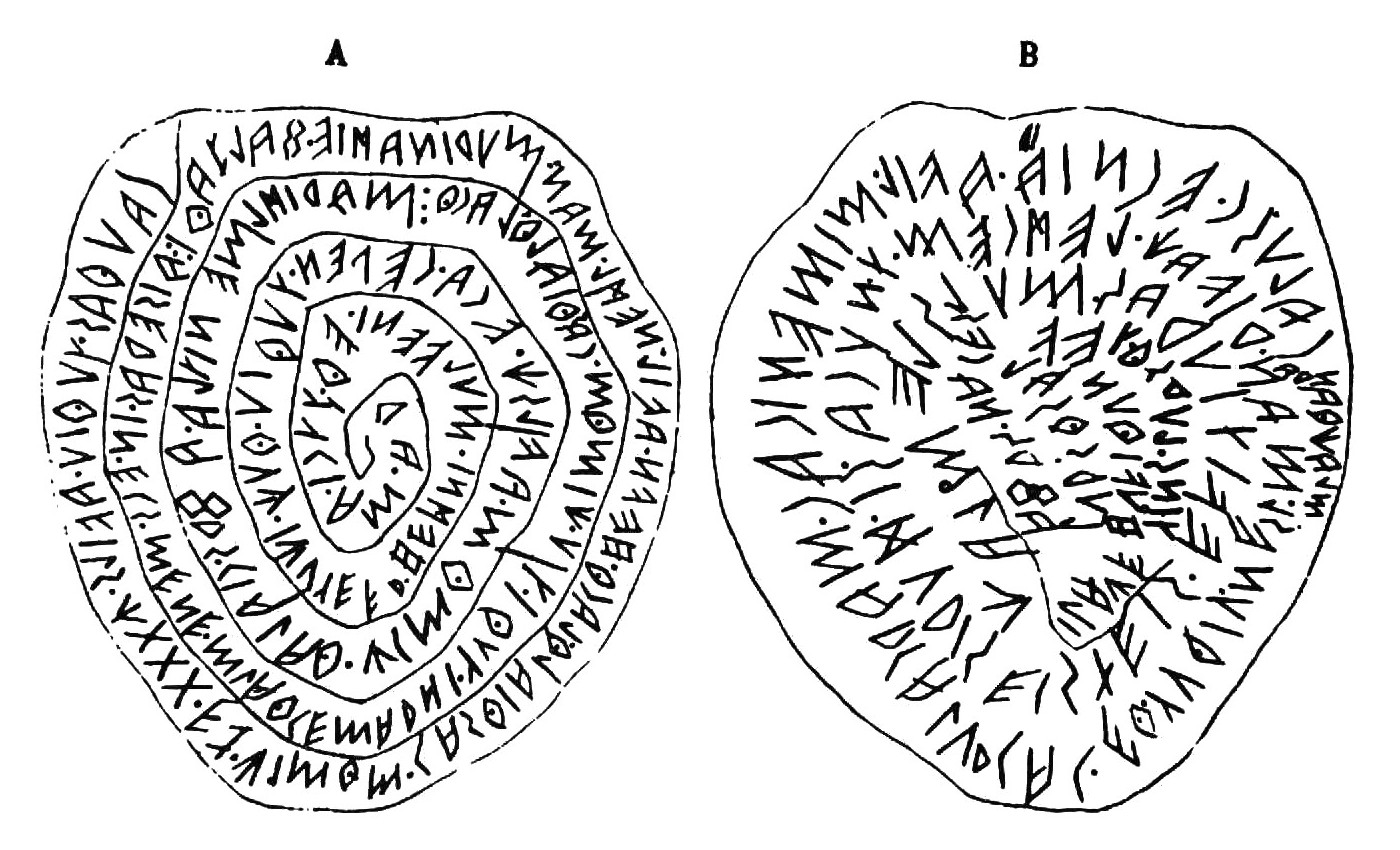
Drawing of the two sides

The text seems to be a series of dedications to various gods and ancestors (in bold below): Cautha, "the gods of this place," Maris Menita ("Maris the Maker"), and "the ancestors" (af-r- or "forefathers" < ap "father") on side A; Thanr and Calus, Śuri, Tinin the area of Lur, and (?) in the area of Lur, on side B. Other information includes where the dedications (sacrifices? offerings?) are to take place (casthia, lac, fal-za, chim "the place of offering (or of slaughter)," leśca; all in locative -th(-i)), how often (avil-s "annually" on side A, "every four years"? on side B), with what (musl = "honey wine"? and thu-n "firstling"? also on side B), who is to perform them ("priest" cepen "of the village of the year" tuthiu avils--so "annually appointed village priest"), and on whose behalf ("for the deceased of the Murina [family]," "for/on behalf of the beloved ancestors" afrs . naces—on side A; "on behalf of tnuca"?, "for [honoring] the deceased" (nesl)--on side B). Much of the rest is obscure, with the main verb "dedicate" apparently regularly elided.

== The text ==
With over 70 individual words, the text differs significantly from the thousands of short Etruscan grave inscriptions. It is among the longest in the Etruscan language. The text is written on both sides (referred to here as side A and side B), from right to left, as is usual in Etruscan texts. The text is also unusual in that it spirals inward, to be read counterclockwise from the outside to the inside. Most words are separated by an interpunct.

=== Side A ===
cauthas . tuthiu . avils /LXXX/ ez . chimthm . casthialth . lacth . hevn . avil . neśl . man . murinaśie . falzathi ⁝
aiseras . in . ecs . mene . mlacthe marni . tuthi . tiu . chimthm . casthialth . lacth ⁝
mariśl menitla . afrs . cialath . chimth . avilsch . eca . cepen . tuthiu . thuch . ichu

tevr . heśni . mulveni . eth . zuci . am . ar

=== Side B ===
mlach thanra calusc . ecnia . iv avil . mi menicac . marca lurcac . eth . tuthiu . nesl .

man . rivach . leścem . tnucasi .

śuris . eis teis . evi tiuras . mulsle mlach ilache
tins . lursth . tev huvi thun
lursth sas afrs . naces

== Partial translation ==
From van der Meer, except where noted.

Side A

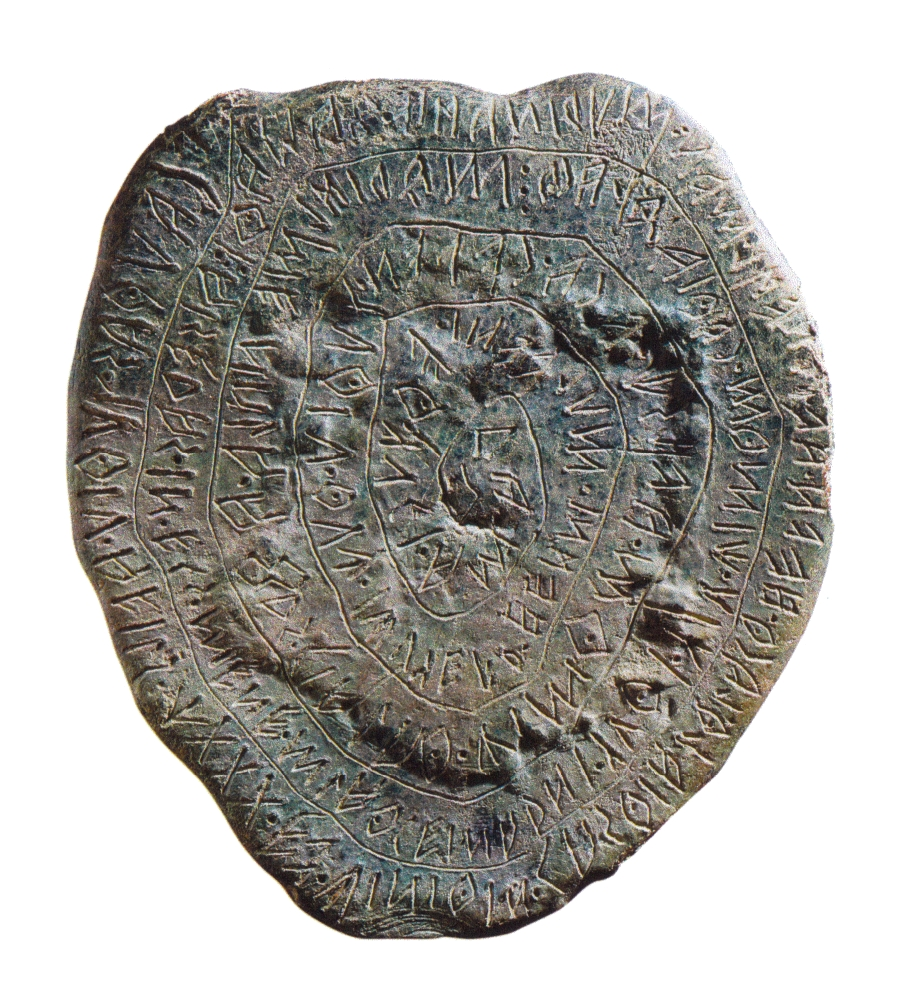
Side A of the plaque

For Cautha, the annually [appointed] village [priest will dedicate] 80 ez. In addition, [dedications must be made] in the place of offering (chim-th- according to Rix; van der Meer translates "slaughtering place"; or "at the altar"?), at [the stream] Casthia, [where it empties] into the lake, [during] Hev- [period] annually. [And a dedication must be made] in the sacred alcove (?literally "in a/the small holy place" fal-za-thi) [that is] the memorial (man) for the deceased (neśl) of the Murina [family]."

For the gods which [are the protective spirits?] of this place, the magistrature (marni) [and] the village [priest(-s?)] must make (mene) [a dedication?] and take care of [it] (?mlach-the literally "make (it) beautiful"), monthly (tiu); in addition [dedications must be made?] in the place of offering, at [the stream] Casthia, [where it empties] into the lake.

For Maris Menita (="the Maker"), for the ancestors, also this [previously mentioned] annually [appointed] village-priest (avil-s-ch eca cepen tuthiu, literally "and of the year this priest of the village") [must make a dedication] in the ciala, [and] in addition in the place of offering, ["and in"?, or "namely"?] the ichu house (thuch); You who are overseers of these rituals, heś- (="attend to"?) [and] consecrate [them]! This [is the] announcement: 'Be [present], [and] carry out the dedications (ar)!'

Side B

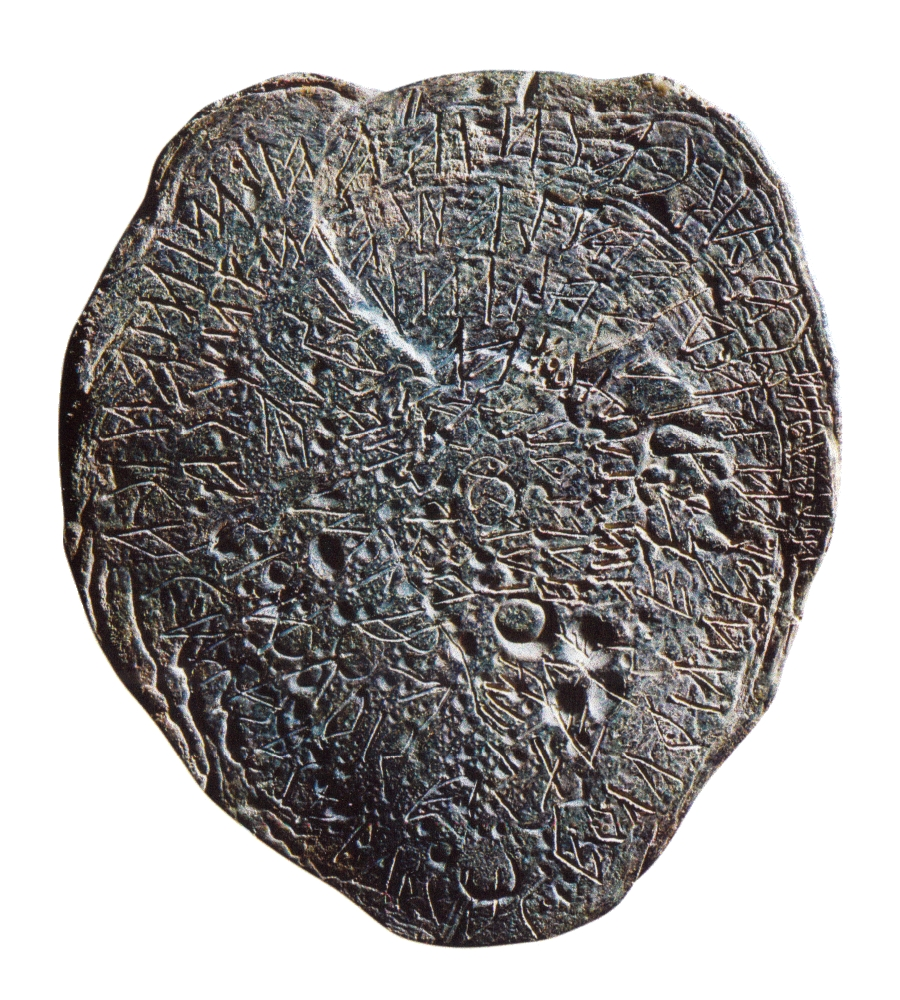
Side B of the plaque

O beautiful [deities] of Thanr and of Calus, ecni must be done (?) [every] 4 years; I [am the lead plaque] of [the god] Maris the Maker and of Lur. This [is the set of instructions] for the village [priest], for [honoring] the deceased (nesl).

The monument [of the deceased] rivax (="must be commemorated"?), in addition, in the leśca on behalf of (or "by" or "during [the period of]") Tnuca.

For Suri the god, [perform] these [rituals] on the ides (?ev-) of every month (?tiuras, literally "of months") [with] honey wine [?muls-le], [as is] proper (? mlach, literally "beautiful"), during the feast.

For Tin in the area of Lur, you who oversee the rituals must offer (huvi?) a firstling (thu-n, literally "a first thing").

In the area of Lur, [make a dedication] for the beloved ancestors themselves (sa-s afr-s nace-s, literally "self for the ancestors beloved").

== Commentary ==
Most of the gods mentioned are associated with the underworld, including Cautha (often mentioned with Suri), Calus (a god of wolves, sometimes used as an epithet of Tin(ia)), Suri, and Lur (though Pittau considers this last to be connected to Latin laurus "laurel" and hence to Apollo). According to van der Meer, Lur's name may be related to Latin luridus "pale," possibly in contrast with Suri "black." The name also occurs in the Liber Linteus (5.22) paired with a less well known deity Zer: cisum θesane uslanec mlaχe Luri Zeric-- "Also [make] a three-fold (cisum') [libation?] in the morning (θesan-e) and during the noon [hour] (uslan-e-c) to the beautiful (mlaχe) Lur and to Zer. In line 6.18 of the same text, the name takes the form Lurni.

The word tin on side B is assumed here to be a form of the theonym Tinia, the Jupiter-like head of the Etruscan pantheon, but it could also mean "day." Also on side B, the deity Thanr is usually associated with divine births and with the goddess of desire Turan. But here she appears amongst mostly underworld deities, suggesting she is both a goddess of birth and of death.

The form lachth (twice on side A) also occurs in the Tabula Capuana along with a variant lachuth, both in line 26. There, it also seems to be a place for an offering (nuthe-ri) that must be made, and where gifts (turxais) are brought (eschathce). The meaning van der Meer gives for lach- there is "basin." The form with a -u- stem strongly suggests connection with Italic *laku- "basin; lake," so it may be the latter meaning that applies here, as van der Meer suggests, especially if he is also right in suggesting that casth- which immediately precedes it is also a body of water, perhaps a river or stream.

The name Suri occurs also in the third line of the Tabula Capuana. The word teis generally means "these" as, for example in line 10.16 of the Liber Linteus, other forms of tei- occurring in 2.11, 2.13 and at 9.17. The term ev- may be connected to the term esv- in the Liber Linteus (4.15, 4.20) (and, as iśv-, at the beginning of the second and third sections of the Tabula Capuana), which van der Meer tentatively translates as "the ides."

The sequence mi menicac marca lurcac apparently includes abbreviations of the terms maris and menita from side A. The term Maris on side A refers to a set of deities represented on mirrors as babies, but little else is known of their function. Note that mar appears to be used as an abbreviation for or alternate form of maris on the Liver of Piacenza (numbers 30 and 39), just as it appears (with abbreviate meni-ta) on side B. Pittau, on the other hand, considers it a name for Cupid/Eros.

The word ar at the end of side A can mean simply 'make,' but also 'dedicate/carry out a dedication' as it probably is here, as seen in line 6 of the Cippus Perusinus: ipa ama hen naper XII Velθina-θur-aś araś -- "that 12 hen (arable?) acres of Velthinas shall be dedicated". The family name Murina on side A is well known, since inscriptions indicate that members lived in Tarquinia, Volsinii, the Siena region, Chiusi, and Perugia.

At the end of their study of the piece, Bortolamasi et al. conclude: "From the above, it is clear that the Magliano Disc confirms the profound religious sense that permeated Etruscan society. The invocation to Cautha, which constitutes the incipit of side A and which can be interpreted as 'a Cautha' or 'per Cautha', the name of a noble 'murinaśie' family,22 together with the spiral-shaped writing, notoriously associated with the motion of the sun, to which the deity Cautha is related, all point to the function of the Magliano Disc as a dedicatory amulet. Moreover, the use of amulets in Etruscan culture is well known due to their profound mysticism: animals, trees, and fruits are widely represented in positive or negative forms. It is therefore plausible that the Disc's dedicatory function was associated with an element of Cautha's nature (the sun) in anthropomorphic form."

== See also ==
- Etruscan religion
- Etruscan language

== Sources ==
Bonfante, G. & L. Bonfante. The Etruscan Language: An Introduction. 2nd Edition. Manchester University Press, Manchester/New York 2002, ISBN 0719055407, pp. 214–220.
Bonfante, L. Reading the Past: Etruscan. University of California Press, 1990, pp. 25, 28, 50.
Clackson, J. (Review of Massarelli) The Journal of Roman Studies, Volume 106, November 2016, pp. 264-265. DOI: https://doi.org/10.1017/S0075435816000046
Bortolamasi, Marc, Ester Cantini, Daniela Tagliazucchi, "Il Disco (o Piombo) di Magliano: ipotesi di studio tra storia e archeologia" ("The lead Disk of Magliano historical and archaeological study hypotheses") Atti Soc. Nat. Mat. Modena 155, 2024. https://www.researchgate.net/publication/385660318_The_lead_Disk_of_Magliano_historical_and_archaeological_study_hypotheses
Corsten, S. P. "Der Inhalt der Bleiplatte von Magliano" Glotta volume 27, 1939. Göttingen; Vandenhoeck & Ruprecht. pp. 271-275.
Cristofani, M. Dizionario della civiltà etrusca. Giunti Gruppo Editoriale, Florenz 1999, ISBN 88-09-21728-4, p. 154.
Deecke, W. "Die Bleitafel von Magliano." in: Rheinisches Museum für Philologie. Neue Folge. Volume 39, 1884, pp. 141–150.
García, Antonio "The Lead Plaque of Magliano, the Spiral Inscription from 5th century BC That Reveals the Secrets of Etruscan Religiosity" La Brujula Verde, March 5, 2026.https://www.labrujulaverde.com/en/2026/03/the-lead-plaque-of-magliano-the-spiral-inscription-from-5th-century-bc-that-reveals-the-secrets-of-etruscan-religiosity/
Goldmann, E. Beiträge zur Lehre vom indogermanischen Charakter der etruskischen Sprache. Gerold & Co., Vienna 1936, pp. 219–252.
de Grummond, N. & E. Simon. The Religion of the Etruscans. University of Texas Press, Austin 2006, ISBN 9780292721463, pp. 57–61.
Grünwedel, A. (1922) Tusca. 1. Die Agramer mumienbinden. 2. Die inschrift des cippus von Perugia. 3. Die Pulena-rolle. 4. Das bleitäfelchen von Magliano. 5. Die leber von Piacenza. 6. Golini-grab I. 7. Die inschrift von Capua. Leipzig : K. W. Hiersemann. https://catalog.hathitrust.org/Record/001724165
Hooker, T. J. (ed.) Reading the Past: Ancient Writing from Cuneiform to the Alphabet. University of California Press, Berkeley 1990, ISBN 0520074319, pp. 346, 376–377.
Jannot, J.-R. (2005) Religion in Ancient Etruria trans. J. K. Whitehead. University of Wisconsin Press. pp 36 ff.
Massarelli, R. I testi etruschi su piombo (Biblioteca di studi etruschi 53). Pisa/Rome: Fabrizio Serra editore, 2014. ISBN 9788862275712. (in Italian)
Pallottino, M. The Etruscans. Penguin, 1975, pp. 117, 142-143, 199, 221-222.
Pallottino, M. Etruscology: History and Culture of the Etruscans. 7th edition, Springer, Basel 1988, ISBN 303486048X, pp. 421, 480–482.
Pauli, Carolis Corpus Inscriptionem Etruscarum. Barth, Leipsig 1923, pp. 134-138.
Pittau, M. Studi sulla lingua etrusca. Ipazia Books, Sassari 2016, ISBN 978-1-980914-70-9, pp. 155–163.
Rendini, P and M. Firmati. Archeologia a Magliano in Toscana. Siena 2003.
Strong, D. The Early Etruscans. London, Rainbird. 1968, p. 102.
Teza, E. "Di una iscrizione etrusca trovata in Magliano." in: Rivista di filologia e di istruzione classica. Volume X, 1882, pp. 530–534.
Torp, A. Etruskische Beiträge. Volume 3, 1902–1906.
van der Meer, L. B. "The Lead Plaque of Magliano." in: C. Chiaramonte, G. Bagnasco, F. Chiesa (Eds): Interpretando l’antico. Scritti di archeologia offerti a Maria Bonghi Jovino. Monduzzi Editoriale, Mailand 2013, pp. 257–275.
