= Liver of Piacenza =

Etruscan artifact

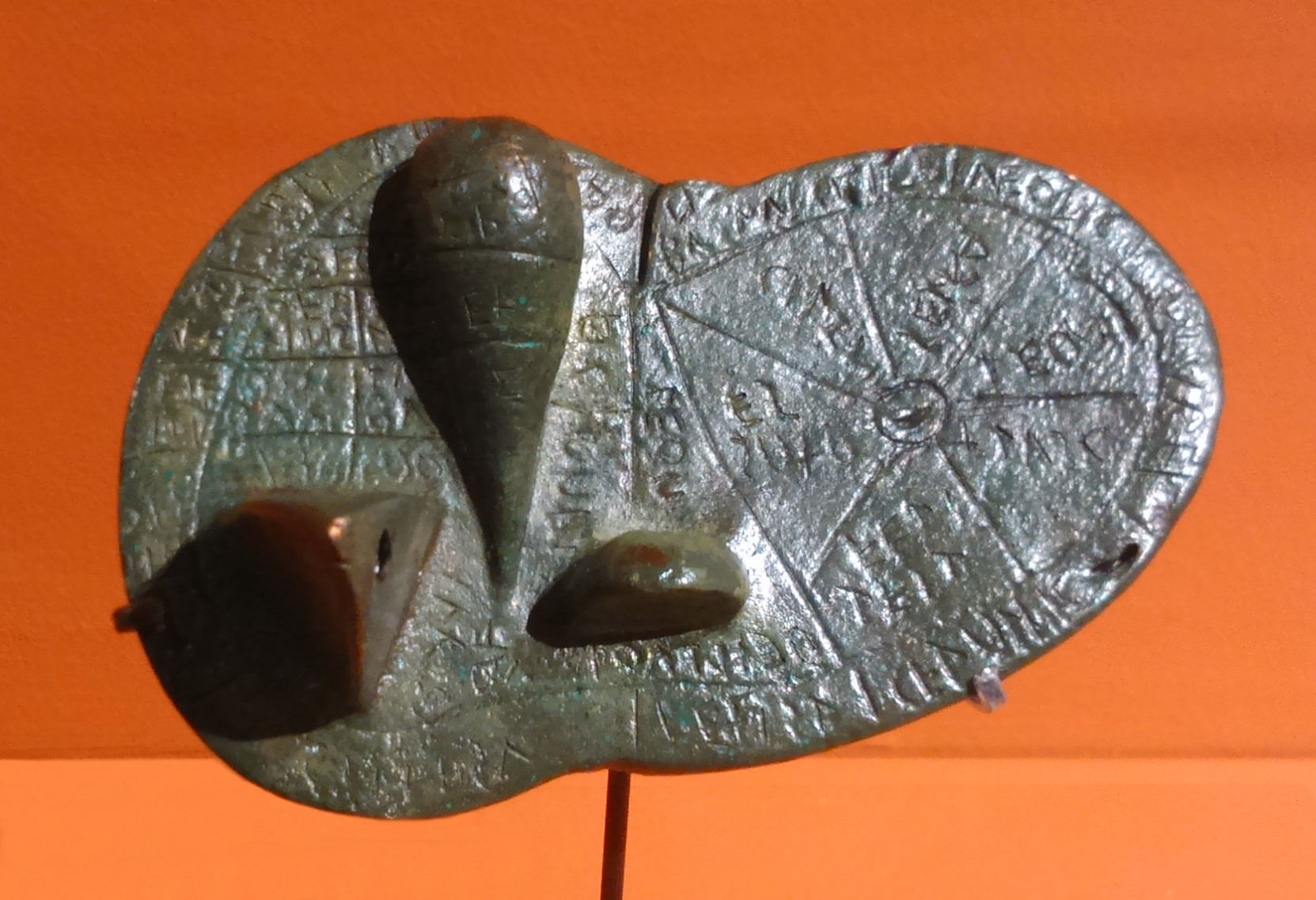
The Liver of Piacenza, with a diagram and Etruscan inscriptions.

The Liver of Piacenza is an Etruscan artifact found in a field on September 26, 1877, near Gossolengo, in the province of Piacenza, Italy, now kept in the Municipal Museum of Piacenza, in the Palazzo Farnese.

It is a life-sized bronze model of a sheep's liver covered in Etruscan inscriptions (TLE 719), measuring 126 × 76 × 60 mm (5 × 3 × 2.4 inches) and dated to the late 2nd century BC, i.e. a time when the Piacenza region would already have been Latin-dominated (Piacenza was founded in 218 BC as a Roman garrison town in Cisalpine Gaul).

== Description and interpretation ==
The liver is subdivided into sections for the purposes of performing haruspicy (hepatoscopy); the sections are inscribed with names of individual Etruscan deities.

=== Middle Eastern parallels; anatomical model ===
The Piacenza liver is a striking conceptual parallel to clay models of sheep's livers known from the Ancient Near East, reinforcing the evidence of a connection (be it by migration or merely by cultural contact) between the Etruscans and the Anatolian cultural sphere. A Babylonian clay model of a sheep's liver dated to the Middle Bronze Age is preserved in the British Museum. The Piacenza liver parallels the Babylonian artifact by representing the major anatomical features of the liver (the gall bladder, caudate lobe and posterior vena cava) as sculpted protrusions.

=== Cosmos model; divination method ===
The outer rim of the Piacenza liver is divided into 16 sections; since according to the testimony of Pliny and Cicero, the Etruscans divided the heavens into 16 astrological houses, it has been suggested that the liver is supposed to represent a model of the cosmos, and its parts should be identified as constellations or astrological signs. In this interpretation, each of the 16 houses was the "dwelling place" of an individual deity. Seers would draw conclusions from, for example, the direction in which lightning was seen. Lightning in the east was auspicious, lightning in the west inauspicious (Pliny 2.143f.). Stevens (2009) surmises that Tin, the main god of lightning, had his dwelling due north, as lightning in the north-east was most lucky, lightning in the north-west most unlucky, while lightning in the southern half of the compass was not as strong an omen (Servius ad. Aen. 2.693).

=== Inscribed deity names ===
The theonyms are abbreviated and in many cases, the reading even of the abbreviation is disputed. As a result, there is a consensus for the interpretation of individual names only in a small number of cases. The reading given below is that of Morandi (1991) unless otherwise indicated:

circumference:

1. tin[ia] /cil/en
2. tin[ia]/θvf[vlθas]
3. tins/θ neθ[uns]
4. uni/mae uni/ea (Juno? Maia?)
5. tec/vm (Cel? Tellus?)
6. lvsl (Usil)
7. neθ[uns] (Neptunus)
8. caθ[a] This name also appears on the Lead Plaque of Magliano, in the Sarcophagus of Laris Pulenas, and perhaps (as caθnis) in the Tabula Capuana (line 9).
9. fuflu/ns (Bacchus)
10. selva (#Silvanus)
11. leθns
12. tluscv
13. celsc (Cels)
14. cvl alp (Alpanu)
15. vetisl (Veiovis?)
16. cilensl

interior:

17. tur[an] (Venus)
18. leθn (as no. 11)
19. la/sl (Lares?)
20. tins/θvf[vlθas] (as no. 2)
21. θufl/θas
22. tins/neθ (as no. 3?)
23. caθa (as no. 8)
24. fuf/lus (as no. 9)
25. θvnθ(?)
26. marisl/latr
27. leta (Leda)
28. neθ (as no. 7)
29. herc[le] (Hercules)
30. mar[is] (This name also appears on the Lead Plaque of Magliano.)
31. selva (as no. 10)
32. leθa[m] (probably an underworld deity. Seen also in the Tabula Capuana, lines 3, 6-7, 8, and 12. Perhaps same as leθn(s) in #s 11 and 18.)
33. tlusc (as no. 12)
34. lvsl/velch
35. satr/es (Saturnus)
36. cilen (as no. 16)
37. leθam(as n. 32)
38. meθlvmθ
39. mar[is] (as no. 30)
40. tlusc (as no. 12)

Two words are on the bottom side of the artefact:

1. tivs (or tivr "Moon" or "Month"?))
2. usils ("of the sun" or "of the day")

== See also ==
- Etruscan religion
