= Laran =

Etruscan god of war

- Underworld God of War
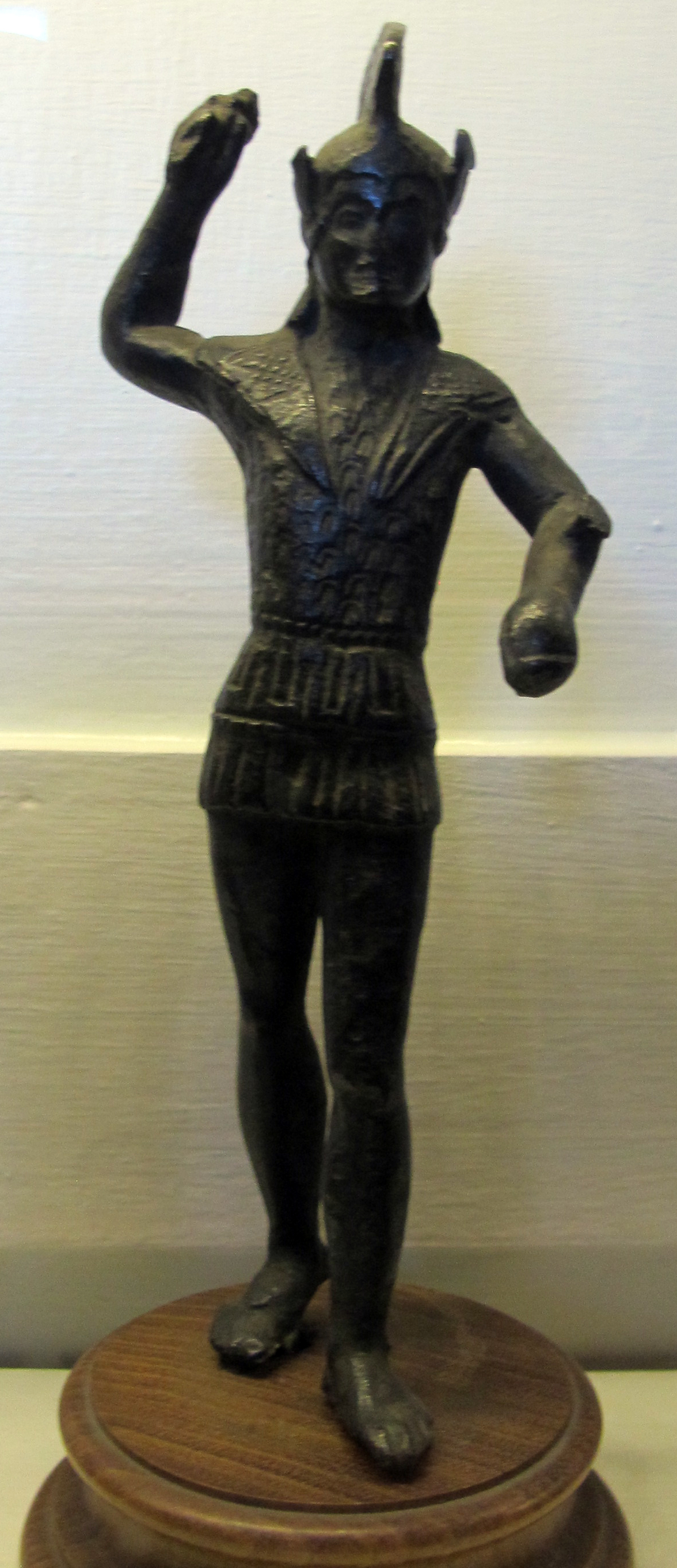
- A statuette of the god Laran, depicted with traditional armour and a helmet.
- Symbol: Cuirass, shield, sword, and lance
- Consort: Turan

Equivalents
- Greek: Ares
- Roman: Mars

In Etruscan mythology and religion, Laran (or Larun) is the war god. In art, he was portrayed as a naked youth wearing a helmet, a cuirass and carrying a spear, shield, or lance. Laran also appears to be an underworld god. Among his attributes is his responsibility to maintain peace. According to some scholars, he also seems to have been the guardian of boundaries as shown by the boundary cippi found in Bettona with the inscriptions tular Larna and tular larns. Along with eight other Etruscan gods, he can wield lightning. Due to the Tabula Capuana we know that the Laran festival was celebrated on the Ides of May. Laran is the Etruscan equivalent of the Greek Ares and the Roman Mars. Like many other Etruscan gods, his name is gender neutral.

Previous scholarship thought that Marís, a mysterious figure(s) was the Etruscan god of war due to the similarity of the name to the Roman war god Mars. However, that has been disproven and Laran has been identified as the Etruscan god of war.

Laran was also shown in the company of another Etruscan god, Lurs. The two names were associated with each other since the archaic period.

== Worship ==
Evidence shows that Etruscan deities could be prepared meals by priests for the gods in utilitarian ware. An inscription found implies that meals were prepared in his honour.

Inscriptions have been found showing evidence of cult worship of Laran.

Due to the Tabula Capuana we know that the festival of Laran was celebrated on the Ides of May. The Tabula Capuana also contains a variant in spelling of Laran’s name: Larun.

== Scenes from Etruscan Art ==
Laran may be recognized in Etruscan art from his attributes, or is sometimes identified by his name. Since Etruscan literature has not survived, the meaning of the scenes in which he appears can only be interpreted by comparison to Greek and Roman myths, through information about Etruscan myths preserved by Greek and Latin literature, or through conjectural reconstructions based on other Etruscan representations.

- Laran appears with Turms and a youthful, long haired Tinia on a mirror from Orvieto, Settecamini. He is shown with a spear and with his hand over a shield, with a sun like motif on it.
- A scene on an Etruscan mirror shows Leinth, Turan, Menrva, Laran, and two Mariś babies. He stands behind Menrva, holding a spear and wearing a mantle.
- He fights against the giant Celsclan, the son of the earth goddess Cel on a mirror from Populonia in Florence.

== Inscriptions ==
A 5th century BCE vase from a sanctuary near a bridge at San Giovenale states has been identified showing a connection between the two gods Lurs and Laran:

- mi l[urs l]aruniθla ‘I (am) of Lurs that of Larun (*lurs laruniθa)’

== See also ==
- Turan
- Mars
- Ares
- Etruscan mythology
- Etruscan Religion
