= Lur (deity) =

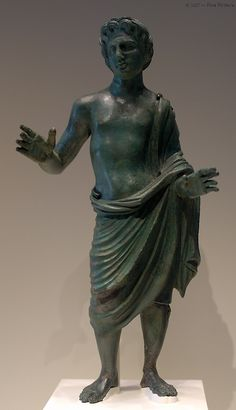
Bronze Statuette of Vel Matanas with an inscription translating to "sacred gift for Lur"

Lur (Lurs, Luridus, Lurmitla) is an Etruscan underworld deity with little known history. Lur does not have many depictions but the ones that have been found show the deity as a male. He has been noted to be associated with a prophetic nature, while also bearing oracular and martial characteristics. He has been linked to another deity by the name of Laran, which, it has been suggested, is where Lur derives his name from. The context of the name has been associated with darkness and the underworld. A fifth century vase found near a sanctuary in San Giovenale bears an inscription that translates: "I am Lurs, that of Laran." Another inscription has been found with the spelling lartla, noting relations to a Lar, which gives a label to Lur that describes features of protection. The name may be related to Latin luridus "pale".

== Archaeological Evidence ==
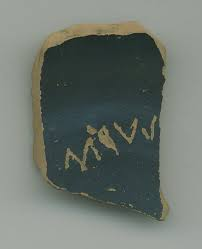
Piece of shard found during an excavation in Cetamura

There is not much information about Lur except from the various pieces of evidence found in differing areas. In Corchiano, a candelabrum dating around 400-350 BCE was found with an inscription in dedication to Lur. A bucchero chalice found by a small shrine near a bridge in San Giovenale does not specifically have Lur inscribed but rather laruniθla, again, relating Lur to other gods with similar name epithets. A bronze sheet from Perugia bears text that translates "dedicated to Lvrmita," suggesting the gods' oracular characteristic. In addition, a bronze statuette possibly from Orvieto features a man, perhaps Vel Matunas, given the inscription on the cloak. The statuette has another votive inscription that translates "precious/sacred gift to Lur", also contributing to his oracular nature.

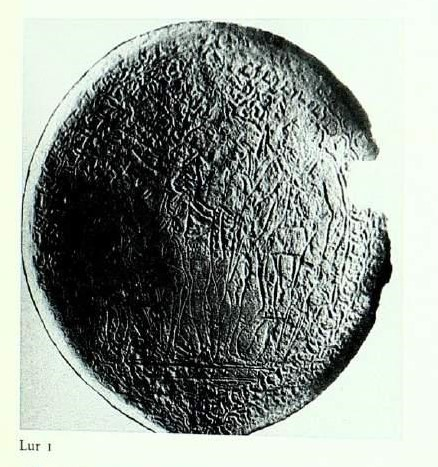
Bronze Mirror of Tinia, Lur and another unknown young man found in Vulci. Pushkin Museum of Fine Arts, Moscow. Ca, 350 BCE

Lur is mentioned on the Lead Plaque of Magliano, which seems to bear a list of names of underworld deities--Cautha, Thanr, Calus, Suri--along with information about dedications to them. The beginning of side B reads: mlach thanra calusc ecnia iv avil mi menicac marca lurcac meaning ""O beautiful (deity) of Thanr and Calus ecnia (subj. pro imp.?) IV year (each 4 years?); I (am) of Meni, Mar(is) and Lur...." The last two lines read: tins . lursth . tev huvi thun /lursth sas afrs . naces which van der Meer interprets as: ""for Tin in the area of Lur, O referee, offer(?) a firstling /[and make an offering of a firstling] in the area of Lur, for the beloved ancestors themselves." Note the connection of Lur with Tin(ia) here. Lur is also mentioned on another lead plaque from Santa Marinella, which shows a connection to Tinia and reinforces this relation with other findings in Bolsena inscribed with lurs near two Tinia altars.

Lur also shows up in the longest extant Etruscan text--the Liber Linteus. In the fifth column, section D (lines 19-22), the following sequence is found: nunθen . θesan . tinś . θesan /eiseraś . śeuś . unuχ . mlaχ . nunθen . θesviti / favitic . faśei . cisum . θesane . uslanec / mlaχe . luri . zeric which translates roughly: "Make an offering to Θesan ("Dawn Goddess" or "Venus") of Tin ("Jupiter" or "bright(ening) sky") and to Θesan / of the Dark Gods; for them make an appropriate offering with oil of the morning / and of the evening. (Also) a three-fold (libation?) in the morning and during the noon (hour) / to the beautiful Lur and Zer." Note again that Tin occurs in the same passage. In the same text, in the otherwise illegible 18th line of the sixth column after three intentionally blank lines (which elsewhere seems to be a marker for a new ritual and date), the form lur-ni-θi occurs, which van der Meer interprets to me "in the place sacred to Lurni" perhaps a variant form for Lur.

However, the most prominent evidence discovered concerning Lur is a bronze mirror from Vulci. The mirror is an extension of Lurs relationship with Tinia. In the Lexicon Iconographicum Mythologiae Classicae, H.L Stoltenberg describes the scene present with three figures, Tinia, Lur, and an unknown young man. Tinia is in the middle, identifiable by the lightning bolt. He is wearing a chiton and looking to his right with his right arm raised. The unknown young man sits, appearing to be listening to whatever Tinia might be saying. To the left of the mirror, on Tinia's right, sits Lur. He is naked except for a cloak, which is only noticeable from the seal around his neck. His head is thrown back, hair frizzled, and mouth partially open. He carries a sword in his right hand and his left is gesturing towards Tinia. A head coming from the clouds is also seen and has been implied to be delivering a message to Lur. With the combinations of Lurs behavior and gestures, the mirror amplifies a prophetic deity.

== Cult ==
The numerous candelabra found with Lur inscriptions suggest the object was notable as an offering to the god. An excavation at a sanctuary in Cetamura where a shard with an inscribed Lurs was found, likewise pieces of iron founded fit together to indicate potentially a candelabrum. The bronze Vel Matunas statuette again enforces the cult of Lur. In Gravisca, by the Sacellum Alpha, a miniature shrine, an impasto bowl inscribed with Lur was found. Additionally, a bronze strip from Perugia, as well as a small altar in Vulci both including dedications to lurmitla. The gods name furthermore, is including on the Piacenza liver twice. Scholars have debated with the evidence at hand what exactly the deity Lur oversees. Archaeologist Giovanni Colonna asserts a dark and underworld type of god, while D.F Maras thought of him as more of a warlike and prophetic god. Contrastingly, L. Bouke Van der Meer labels Lur as having the combined qualities.
