= Satre (Etruscan god) =

Etruscan god identified with Saturn

- Other names: Satres
- Ethnic group: Etruscan

Equivalents
- Roman: Saturn

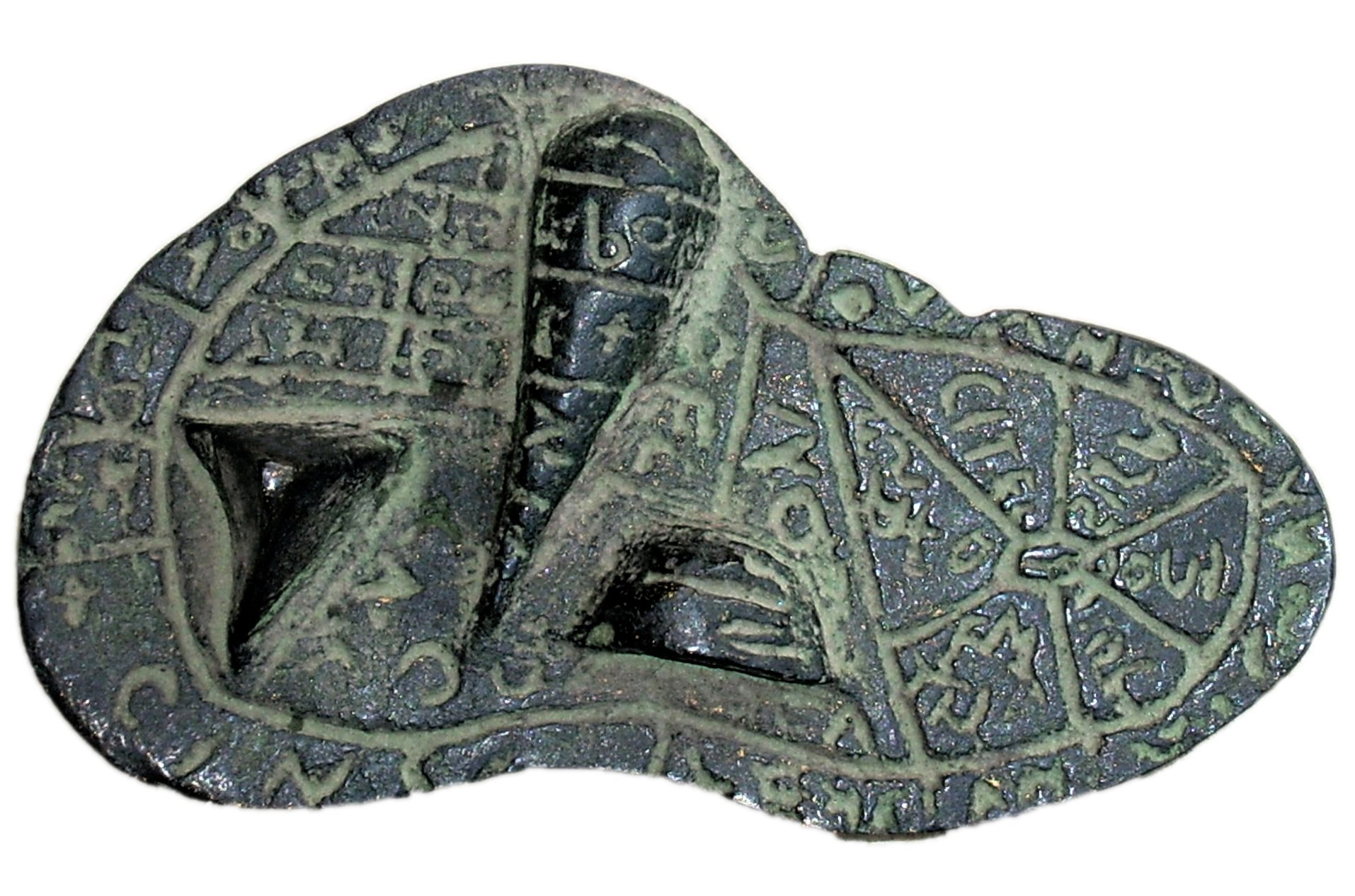
Liver of Piacenza, on which the name Satre appears

Satre or Satres was an Etruscan god who appears on the Liver of Piacenza, a bronze model used for haruspicy. He occupies the dark and negative northwest region, and seems to be a "frightening and dangerous god who hurls his lightning from his abode deep in the earth." It is possible that Satre is also referred to with the word "satrs" in the Liber Linteus ("Linen Book," IX.3), the Etruscan text preserved in Ptolemaic Egypt as mummy wrappings.

Satre is usually identified with the Roman god Saturn, who in a description by Martianus Capella holds a position similar to that of Satre on the liver. The name Satre may be only an Etruscan translation of Saturnus, or Saturnus may derive from the Etruscan; it is also possible that the two deities are unrelated. No image in Etruscan art has been identified as Satre: "this deity remains a riddle."
