= Tabula Capuana =

Etruscan terracotta slab

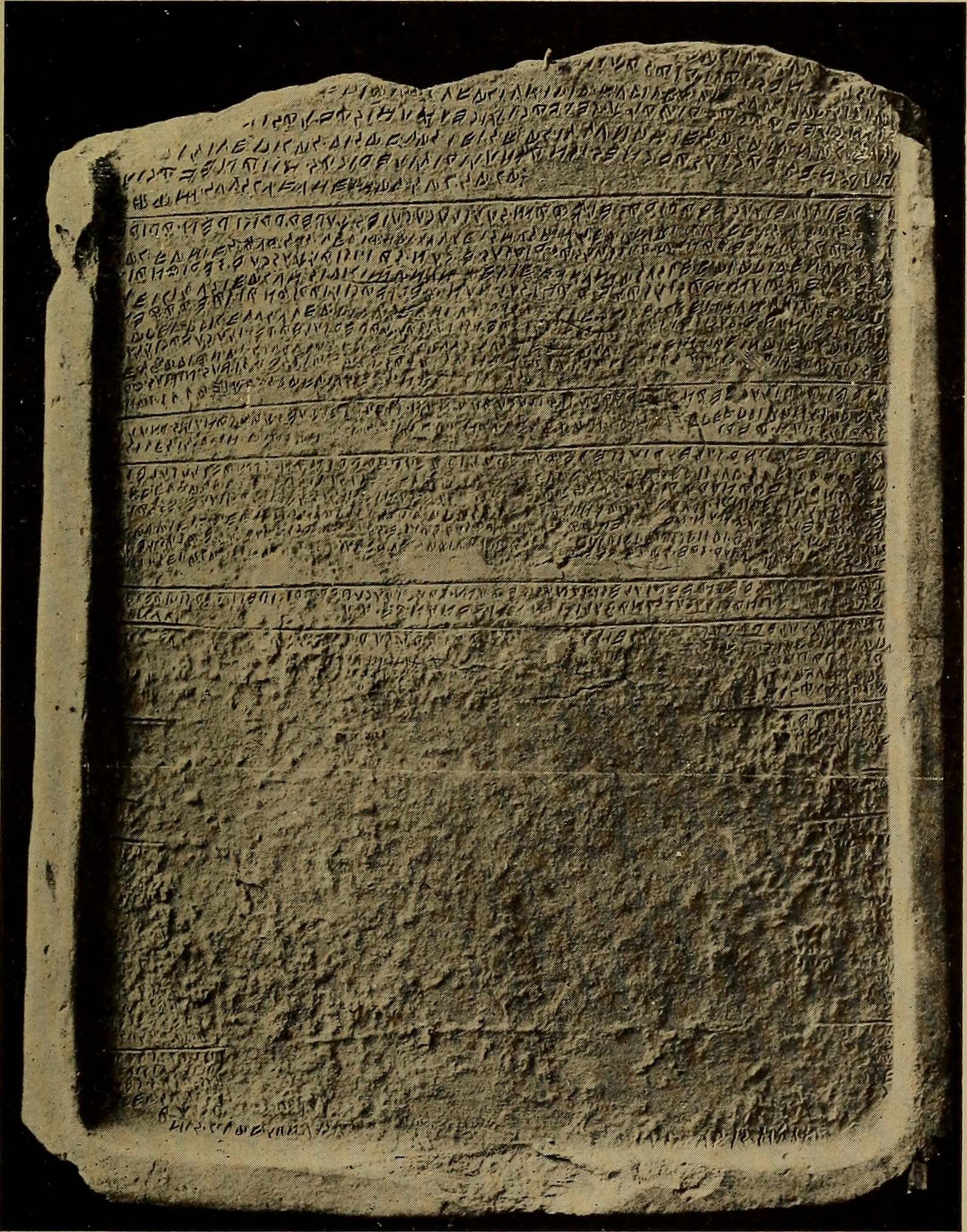
- Material: Terracotta
- Height: 60 cm
- Width: 50 cm
- Created: c. 470 BC
- Discovered: 1898; Santa Maria Capua Vetere, Campania, Italy
- Present location: Berlin, Germany
- Language: Etruscan

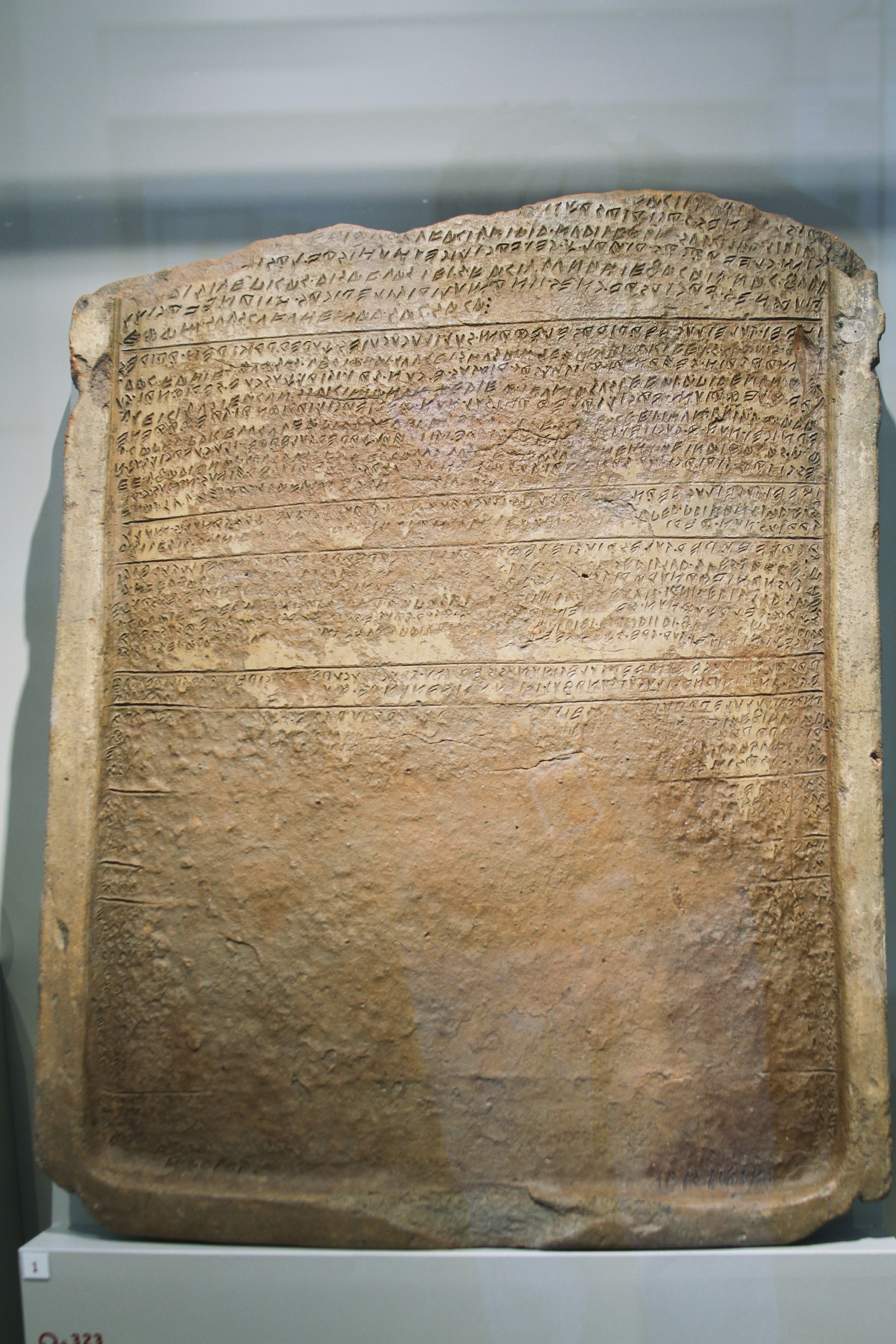
Recent image in the Altes Museum, Berlin

The Tabula Capuana ("Tablet from Capua"; Ital. Tavola Capuana), is an ancient terracotta slab, 50 by 60 cm (20 by 24 in), with a long inscribed text in Etruscan, dated to around 470 BCE, apparently a ritual calendar. About 390 words are legible, making it the second-most extensive surviving Etruscan text. The longest is the linen book (Liber Linteus), also a ritual calendar, used in ancient Egypt for mummy wrappings, now at Zagreb. The Tabula Capuana is located in the Altes Museum, Berlin.

== Description ==
Horizontal scribed lines divide the text into ten sections. The writing is most similar to that used in Campania in the mid-5th century BC, though surely the text being transcribed is much older. The text is boustrophedon, with the first line to be read left to right, the next right to left, etc.

Attempts at deciphering the text (Mauro Cristofani, 1995) are most generally based on the supposition that it prescribes certain rites on certain days of the year at certain places for certain deities. The ten visible sections seem to each be devoted to a different month, March through December. The months of January and February are considered to be later Roman innovations that are not referenced in the text. The text itself was edited by Francesco Roncalli, in Scrivere etrusco, 1985.

Recently, a major scholar in the field, Bouke van der Meer, has proposed a "very tentative partial word-for-word translation" of the text:

== Text example ==
(/ indicates line break; some word breaks are uncertain)

=== First section (lines 1-7): MARCH^{?} ===
The first legible section likely is devoted to rituals to be held in March (though the Etruscan word for this month, Velcitna, does not occur in the legible text, presumably because it was in the missing parts).

There are three to five initial lines missing and then 30-50 characters missing in the initial damaged lines shown here.

...vacil.../^{2}ai savcnes satiriasa.../^{3}...[nunθ?]eri θuθcu
vacil śipir śuri leθamsul

ci tartiria /^{4} cim cleva

ac asri halχtei

vacil iceu śuni savlasie...

(~5-8 characters broken off at the end of this line)

/^{5}[mul]u rizile picasri

savlasieis

vacil lunaśie vaca iχnac

fuli/^{6}nuśnes

vacil savcnes itna

mulu rizile picasri

iane

vacil l/^{7}eθamsul scuvune

marzac saca⋮

Notes: In line 1 and throughout, vacil may mean "libation" (or some similar rite or ceremony), in which case each of the first phrases beginning with it presumably indicate what deity to pour a libation to and perhaps other information. However, Steinbauer (agreeing with Rix) has challenged this assumption and, considering that it seems to be positioned at the beginning of a series of phrases within the context of a step-by-step instruction, proposed that vacil (with its variants vacal and vacl) simply means "then."

In line 2, savc-nes according to van der Meer is an Apolline god, perhaps related in form to saucsaθ at 3.15 of the Liber Linteus. The form in the Liber Linteus, preceded as here by the term vacl "libation," also falls in a section that probably deals with March, though as here there is no explicit mention of a month name. The relevant text from that passage of the Liber Linteus is as follows (3.15-3.17): vacl . an . ścanince . saucsaθ . persin / cletram . śrenχve . iχ . ścanince . ciz . vacl / ara roughly: "The libation which was poured to Sauc- Pers- (should be performed) with the decorated litter just as it had been poured (before); perform the libation three times."

Note that the ending -nes/-nis also occurs in the forms fulinuś-nes (5-6) and caθ-nis (9), all referring to deities.

In line 2, satiriasa (if one word) may be a form of Satre the Etruscan term for Saturn, which also appears on the Piacenza Liver among chthonic deities. Or it could be in some way connected to or contrasting with tartiria at the end of line 3.

In line three, śuri is a (not necessarily exclusively) chthonic deity. The form also appears on side B of the Lead Plaque of Magliano: śuris . eis teis . evi tiuras . mulsle mlach ilache, roughly "For Suri, [perform] these rituals on the ides of the months with honey wine, as is appropriate for the feast."

Leθam-s appears on the Piacenza Liver among chthonic deities, but may have other connections as well. The genitive is used here as usual for indirect object.

In lines three and four, ci(m) means "three," and both tartiria and cleva indicate kinds of offerings, yielding a possible partial translation: "To Lethams, three tartiria (perhaps related to Greek Tartaros, as if '(gifts) for the underworld'?) offerings and three cleva offerings ..." In line 4, halχ- is likely the name of a kind of vase.

A verbal form of vacil may be seen in line 5: vac-a "make a libation (to)?"; But van der Meer reads faca here, with unknown meaning. A similar form, vac-i is in line 28, also preceding a form of fuli/nuśnes. Also in line 5, lunaśie brings to mind the Roman moon goddess, Luna (which some equate with Cath, see below). pi-cas(ri) (5,6) is defined by Pallottino as a verb of offering, to be compared with a-cas "to do; to offer." mulu- (4/5, 6) and scu- (7, 10) seem to be roots meaning "to offer, give" and "finish", respectively; and sac- means "carry out a sacred act; consecrate." In lines 5-6, fuli/nuśnes may be a form of Fufluns, the Etruscan Dionysus who is associated with the Etruscan goddess Caθa who also seems to be mentioned in this text (see below). A somewhat similar form, fuln[folnius] can be found on line 29 of the Tabula Cortonensis.

Note the frequent repetitions (besides vacil): savcnes(2, 6); leθamsul(3, 6/7, 8...); mulu-ri zile picas-ri(4/5, 6, 18/19 but with...a-cas-ri rather than pi-cas-ri); savlasie(is)(4, 5); scu-vune marza(c)(7) versus marza...scuvse(10)...

The tentative partial translation by van der Meer, building on the work of many others suggests this part of the ritual calendar calls for an indeterminate offering be made to the god Saucne, and that libations be performed for the gods Śuri and Letham as well as for the gods Saulasie and Fulinusne. Furthermore, that a gifted rizile be accepted in [the period of?] Iana. And that, the libation to Letham having been properly completed, a marza be consecrated.

=== Second section (starting on line 8): APRIL = apirase ===
The second section seems to be devoted to rituals to be held in April.

iśveitule ilucve apirase

leθamsul ilucu cuiesχu perpri

cipen apires /^{9} racvanies huθ zusle

rithnaitultei

snuza in te hamaiθi

civeis caθnis fan/^{10}iri

marza in te hamaiθi

ital sacri

utus ecunzai

iti alχu

scuvse riθnaitu/^{11}ltei

ci zusle acun siricima nunθeri
eθ iśuma zuslevai apire nunθer/^{12}i

avθleθ aium

vacil ia leθamsul nunθeri
vacil ia riθnaita

eθ aθene/^{13}ica perpri

celutule apirase unialθi turza esχaθce

ei iśum unialθ ara

/^{14}epnicei nunθcu ciiei turzai
riθnaita eiti ia halχ

apertule aφes ilucu vacil zuχn/^{15}e...
elφa riθnaitultrais

vanec calus zusleva atu[unis]ne
inpa vinaiθ acas

aφ/^{16}es

ci tartiria ci turza riθnaitula

snenaziulastra

vaiuser hivus niθusc riθnaitula

hivustra

vaiuser snenaziulas

Notes: Line 8 shows the form isvei which occurs frequently in the Liber Linteus where it appears to mean "festival" or "ides". If the form iśum in line 13 is related, it may mean "festive" or (more likely) "appropriate for a sacred festival" > "sacred." The form tul(e) (8, 9, 10) in some contexts means "stone", perhaps related to tular "border" (< "stone marking a border"?), itself probably related to (or the origin of?) Umbrian tuder "boundary"; also the origin of the Umbrian town name Todi. Here it seems to mean "(on or after) the ides (of a particular month)." According to van der Meer, iluc-ve/u (twice in line 8) means "feast." Of course, iśvei and tule can't both mean "ides", and in any case, the Latin ides originally fell on the full moon and was sacred to Jupiter, but since the deities recognizable here are underworld (leθams and caθ), tul may instead refer to the dark phase of the moon, or the new moon (Latin kalends). As van der Meer points out elaborately elsewhere, the contrast between light and dark gods was very important for the Etruscan calendar and for how they divided up the heavens.

apirase may mean "(in the) month of April." See above for Leθam-sul. Van der Meer translates pep-ri as "must be held." cipen seems to be a priestly title (with variants cepa(r), cepe(n)).

huθ in line 9 means "six", and ci in line 11 means "three." zusle(-vai) (9, 11) means "sacrificial victims" perhaps specifically "piglets."

At the end of line 9, caθ-nis may be a form of Catha, an Etruscan goddess, with an ending -nis/-nes also seen above in other theonymns: savc-nes (lines 2 and 6) and fuli/nuś-nes (lines 5-6). Rarely depicted in art, she is number 8 (among celestial gods) and number 23 on the Piacenza Liver.

sacri (10) is certainly connected to words meaning "sacred; victim for sacrifice"—Latin sacer, Umbrian sacra sakra, Oscan sakri-, and to 'saca' in line 7 above.

nunθe-ri (11 twice) seems to be a verb "invoke" or "offer", with the necessitive ending -ri also seen in pep-ri(8), picas-ri(5), mulu-ri(4/5), and perhaps śu-ri(3) and sac-ri(10). eθ (11, 12) means "thus." avθ-leθ (12) may be related to avθa "northwind; eagle."

The word acun in line 11 may be from Greek agon (ἀγών) originally "struggle", which came to be used as a term for festivals involving competitive sports; compare Latin Agonalia festivals in honor of Janus in Rome held in January, March, May and December. Later forms show syncope (loss of word-internal vowels): acn-es-em on the Liber Linteus (10.5)) and acn-s . priumn-es "the agon of Priam" on the left side of the Volterna urn.

The tentative partial translation by van der Meer, building on the work of many others, suggests this part of the ritual calendar calls: for a Cuieschu Feast to be performed for the god Letham on the Feast of April [which is] on the Ides; that Racvanies be the Priest of April; that six piglets be offered for the ritual; that a snuza, which [is] in the [area of?] Hamai, be declared by Cive [and] by Cathni; and that a statuette of Mariś, which is in the [area of?] Hamai, be consecrated for Ita (? or "for this (festival)"?); that utu be given with ecun and with scuvsa by the Ita priest in the ritual; that three piglets and an acun siricima be offered, and further that iśuma (sanctified items?) be offered with the April piglets in theavθla, but (in this case) for Aiu; that a libation be offered to Letham here (="at this point"?); that a libation be made here (as part of?) the ritual; furthermore that the (sacrifice to?) aθena be held; concerning the love gifts placed in Uni's sanctuary on Earth Day (celitule) in April, take away (any that are not) iśum (sanctified?) in Uni's sanctuary; that three gifts be offered in epn- (and?) a vase (halχ) here in the eit (of the?) ritual; that a libation (be performed) on the Aperta day for the Festival of Aphe in zuchn-; that an offering be made of elfa by the people involved in the ritual, and of young Adonis (?) boars for Calu with vana in the vineyard; that the people of the cult of the servant girl, and the vaiuser priest (?) of Hivu and of Nithu, and the people of Hivu, and the vaiuser of the cult of the servant girl (make an offering of) three tartiria (and) three love gifts for Aphe during the ritual.

=== Third section (lines 18-20): MAY = an/mpile ===
iśvei tule ilucve anp[ili]e laruns ilucu huχ

śanti huri alχu esχaθ canulis

mulu/^{19} rizile zizri
inpa [...] an acasri
tiniantule leθamsul ilucu perpri

śanti arvus/^{20}ta aius nunθeri

Larun, Canuli, Tinia, and Aiu are names of Etruscan gods; huχ may mean "celebrate", alχu "given," esχaθ "bring, place"; arvusta "(produce of the) field" (compare Umbrian arvam "field"; arvia "fruits of the field, grain").

Again, in van der Meer's tentative translation, in summary, the text calls: for a Festival for Larun to be celebrated on the Feast Day of May (namely) on the ides; that Canulis should bring the gifted huri (wild fruits?) vase; that the gifted rizile that must be offered (during ...?) must be ziz-ed; that the feast for Lethams must be held on the day of Tinia; and the vase of the fruits of the field be offered to Aiu.

=== Fourth section (lines 21-24): June = acalva ===
acalve apertule saiuvie leθamsul ilucu perpri

śanti ma(c)vilutule

iti/^{22}r śver

falal [...] husilitule

velθur t[....]sc lavtun icni seri. turza esχaθce
p/^{23}acusnausie θanurari turza esχa[θce]
nis[c l]avtun icni zusle [ś]ilaciiul eses

salχe/^{24}i calaieic
len[..]ai stizaitei

z[a]l rapa z[al..........]

[..]niiac [l]avtun icni seril turza e/^{25}sχaθce

laχuθ nunθe[ri...]

ei[tu] acasri

laχθ turzais . esχa[θce]

[ecl..]θ[u] acas θe

zusleva/^{26} stizaitei acasri

pacus[naśi]eθu[r]

laθiumia[i zusle]i
[ś]iχaiei t[ar]tiriiai
zanusei pepθiai

ra/^{27}tu ceχiniaitei turza esχaθce eθ[.......]

Notes: in line 23, the deity Thanur (Thanr) is a goddess frequently present at the birth of other Etruscan deities and is part of the circle of Turan. But in the Lead Plaque of Magliano, she appears amongst mostly underworld deities, suggesting she is both a goddess of birth and of death. The form laχ(u)- "basin" (twice in line 25) may be akin to Latin lacus "basin, water, lake."

Summarizing van der Meer, the text calls: for a feast for Lethams to be prepared in June on the day of Aperta Saiuvia; for the priest of Ita and of Sva to (present) a dish on the fifth day, and a falal (gift of heaven?) on the day of Husiluta; that seri gifts will have been brought by Velthur and by the T... family; that gifts will have been brought for Thanur by the Pacusnausia (family?); and that some piglets (will have been brought) by the Nis family for Shilaciia Esa, with salcha and with calaia, with len..a and with stizaita, (and) two cups and two...; that the ..nia family will also have brought some seri gifts; that the offerings be made in a basin (laχuθ); that eitu must be made (as an offering); that (those gifts placed) in the basin be those gifts that were brought; that hereby elthu be made; (and) that an offering of piglets be made in the stiza; the Pacusnasia family will have brought gifts ritually in the cachina thus—with lathiuma and with a piglet, with śiχaia and with t[ar]tiriia, with zanuse and with pepθia...

=== Fifth section: probably July (= parθum?) ===
Taking up lines 28-30. According to a gloss TLE 854, the name of July in Etruscan should be Traneus, but the names of the Etruscan months may have varied from place to place, as they did in Greece.

parθumi ilucve iśveitule tinunus seθumsal ilucu perpri

cipen tartiria vaci / fulinuśn[es.....]

/[..]etula

natinusnal . ilucu

ituna fulinuśnai . θenunt

eθu[...]

Summarizing van der Meer, the text calls: for a festival to be held in July on the Feast of the Ides for Tinun (and) for Sethums; that a priest pour a libation (over?) tartiria gifts for Fulinushnai; [here follows illegible material ending with] of...eta; that a feast (be prepared) for Natinushna; that Fulinushnai hold this (?); [and the rest is illegible, except for an initial] eθu...

=== Sixth section: probably August (=papu?) ===
Taking up lines 31-35. From this point on, the tablet is badly damaged and almost no coherent translations can even be attempted beyond the first line below. Again, gloss TLE 854 indicates that the name of August in Etruscan should be [H]ermius, but the names of the Etruscan months may have varied from place to place.

macvilutule papui[....]se ilu[cve...]θasχra turza esχa[θ...]e[s] rapa

Tentative translation of first line: On the fifth day of August, on the (day) of the feast (of ?), bring ...-θasχra gifts and cups. [The rest is mostly obscure.]

== Discovery ==
The tablet was uncovered in 1898 in the burial ground of Santa Maria Capua Vetere.

== Sources ==
- Cristofani, M. (1995) Tabula Capuana: Un calendario festivo di età arcaica Firenze.
- Rendeli, M (200) "Tabula Capuana" in A. Carandini and R. Cappelli (eds.) Roma, Romolo, Remo et la fondazione della città. Milano. pp. 360–361.
- Grünwedel, A. (1922) Tusca. 1. Die Agramer mumienbinden. 2. Die inschrift des cippus von Perugia. 3. Die Pulena-rolle. 4. Das bleitäfelchen von Magliano. 5. Die leber von Piacenza. 6. Golini-grab I. 7. Die inschrift von Capua. Leipzig : K. W. Hiersemann. https://catalog.hathitrust.org/Record/001724165
- van der Meer, L. B. "Some comments on the Tabula Capuana", in: Studi Etruschi 77, 2014 [2015], 149-175.
- Wylin, K. (1997) Review of Cristofani, M. (1995). in Revue belge de Philologie et d'Histoire 75-1 pp. 191–192.
