= Thalna =

Etruscan goddess of childbirth

Bronze mirror depicting Thalna

In Etruscan religion and myth, Thalna was a divine figure usually regarded as a goddess of childbirth. Determinate gender, however, is not necessarily a characteristic of Etruscan deities, and Thalna is also either depicted as male, or seems to be identified as a male figure because of the placement of names around a scene. Her other functions include friendship and prophecy. Her name may mean "growth, bloom." She appears in Etruscan art in the company of Turan, Tinia, and Menrva.

On Etruscan bronze mirrors Thalna is present and looking on in scenes pertaining to birth and infancy.

== See also ==
- List of Etruscan mythological figures
- List of Roman birth and childhood deities
