= Etruscan religion =

Etruscan religion comprises the religious beliefs and practices of the Etruscan civilization. The Etruscans were polytheistic, and although there is some syncretism between their mythological traditions and those of the Greeks and Romans, the Etruscan conception and worship of these divinities is individual and not an adoption of other cultures' practices. Because there are no surviving Etruscan sacred texts, with the exception of the Liber Linteus, it is impossible to fully understand their religion, however we can gain some insight from archaeological evidence. The Etruscans appear to have had specific religious personnel, and to have engaged in a reciprocal practice of offerings, rituals including divination, and funerary rites. As the Etruscan civilization was gradually assimilated into the Roman Republic from the 4th century BC, Etruscan beliefs and mythologies were often incorporated into ancient Roman culture, following the Roman tendency to absorb local gods and customs of other civilizations. The first attestations of an Etruscan religion can be traced back to the Villanovan culture.

== History ==
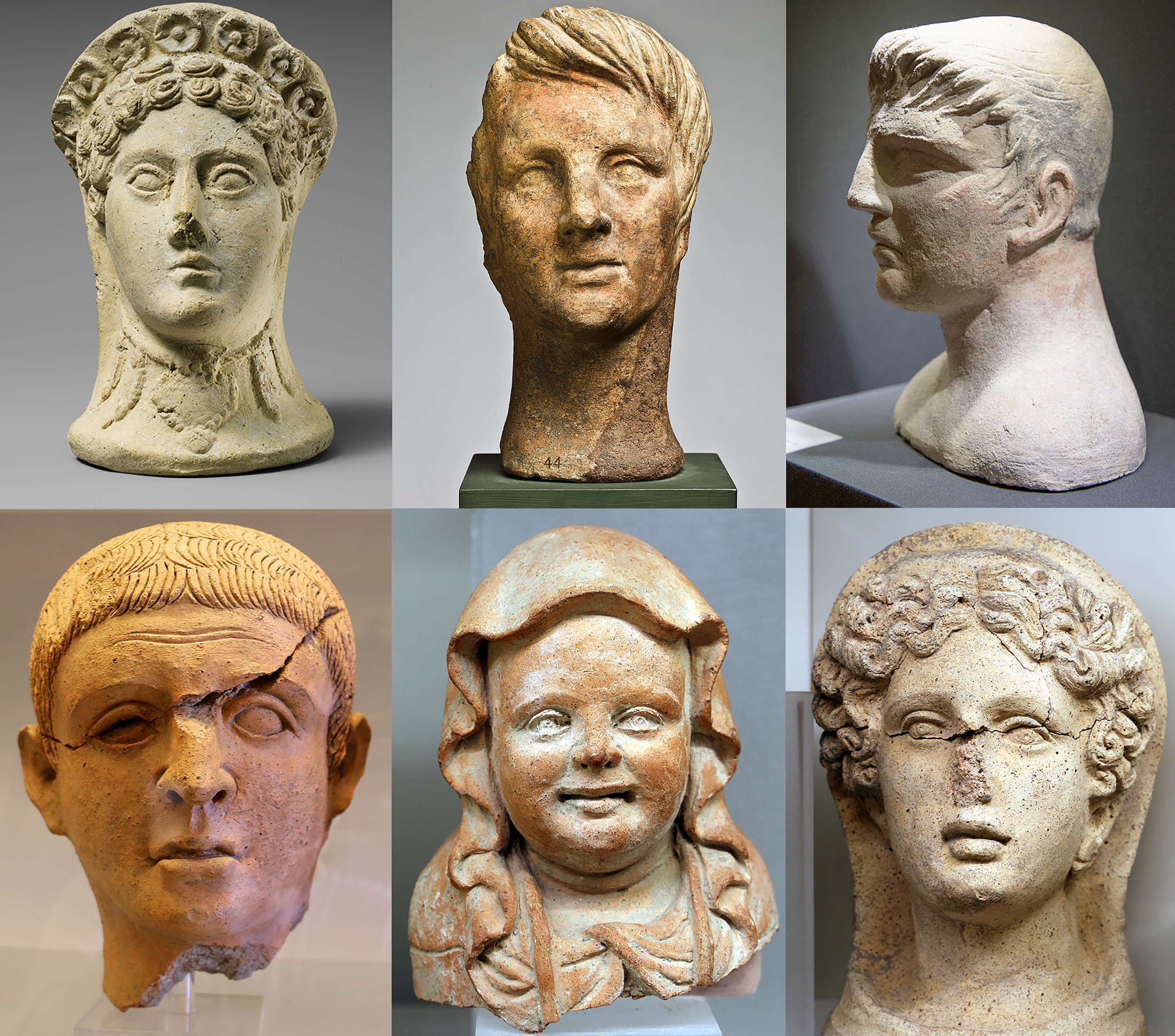
Etruscan votive heads IV-II century BC found in various sanctuaries of Etruria

The earliest evidence for Etruscan religious practices dates to the Villanovan period. The archaeological record preserves data from sites that grow into fully-developed sanctuaries, such as Tarquinia's 9th century BCE Pian d'Civita shrine or Veii's Piazza d'Armi. Numerous cemeteries showcase funeral practices from this period, such as cremation burial in urns and accompanying grave goods. By the 6th century BCE, Etruscan sanctuaries became increasingly monumental, with major temples, expensive offerings, and evidence for animal sacrifice and other rituals.

=== Greek influence ===
During the Archaic period, Greek settlers and traders interacted with local Italic communities along the Central Mediterranean coasts. In addition to influencing some artistic traditions in these communities, Greeks brought their mythological narratives as well. It is unclear how much religious figures such as Hercle (Heracles) or Menvra (Minerva) derived from Greeks, and to what degree they already existed among some Italian communities. It is likely that some heroes from the Homeric tradition, such as Odysseus, Menelaus and Diomedes, were recast in tales of the distant past that had them roaming the lands West of Greece. In Greek tradition, Heracles (Etruscan Hercle) wandered these western areas, doing away with monsters and brigands, and bringing civilization to the inhabitants. Legends of his prowess with women became the source of tales about his many offspring conceived with prominent local women, though his role as a wanderer meant that Heracles moved on after securing the locations chosen to be settled by his followers, rather than fulfilling a typical founder role. It is possible that Odysseus also assumed a similar role for the Etruscans as the heroic leader who led the Etruscans to settle the lands they inhabited, though this cannot be proven at this time.

Greek claims that the sons of Odysseus had once ruled over the Etruscan people date to at least the mid-6th century BC. Lycophron and Theopompus link Odysseus to Cortona (where he was called Nanos). In Italy during this era it could give non-Greek ethnic groups an advantage over rival ethnic groups to link their origins to a Greek hero figure. These legendary heroic figures became instrumental in establishing the legitimacy of Greek claims to the newly settled lands, depicting the Greek presence there as reaching back into antiquity.

=== Roman conquest ===
After the Etruscan defeat in the Roman–Etruscan Wars (264 BCE), the remaining Etruscan culture began to be assimilated into the Roman. The Roman Senate adopted key elements of the Etruscan religion, which were perpetuated by haruspices and noble Roman families who claimed Etruscan descent, long after the general population of Etruria had forgotten the language. In the last years of the Roman Republic the religion began to fall out of favor and was satirized by such notable public figures as Marcus Tullius Cicero. The Julio-Claudians, especially Claudius, whose first wife, Plautia Urgulanilla, claimed an Etruscan descent, maintained a knowledge of the language and religion for a short time longer, but this practice soon ceased.

=== Sources ===
Archaeological evidence for Etruscan religious life comes from the excavation of shrines and sanctuaries. Ritual evidence comes from both monumental religious spaces, such as those found at Tarquinia and Pyrgi, and smaller, so-called "rural" or "boundary" sanctuaries, such as those at Centamura del Chianti and Poggio Colla. Within these sanctuaries, altars are one of the primary pieces of physical evidence for religious activities. Etruscan altars varied in shape and decoration, yet particular bow-shaped moldings seem to have a distinctly Etruscan origin. Altar shape may sometimes have been related to ritual function, as can be seen in the description of a particular altar in the Tabulae Iguvinae, an Umbrian religious text. Along with altars, large quantities of animal bones have been discovered in sanctuary contexts, suggesting the importance of animal sacrifice. Animal bones are also present in funerary contexts and at the boundaries of necropoleis, seemingly having a consecreating function.

Etruscan mythology is evidenced by a number of sources in different media. Pottery, architectural terracottas, inscriptions, and engraved scenes on the Praenestine cistae (ornate boxes; see under Etruscan language) and on specula (ornate hand mirrors), depict religious activities as well as mythological figures. The inscriptions on specula are particularly illuminating, of which two dozen fascicles have been published in the Corpus Speculorum Etruscorum. Etruscan mythological and cult figures also appear in many forms of Etruscan art, and in dedicatory and votive inscriptions, as well as votive objects. For a catalogue of Etruscan mythological figures, visit the Lexicon Iconographicum Mythologiae Classicae. Etruscan inscriptions have recently been given a more authoritative presentation by Helmut Rix, Etruskische Texte. Etruscan language and inscriptions have also been analyzed linguistically by Rex Wallace in Zikh Rasna.

== Seers and divinations ==
The Etruscans believed their religion had been revealed to them by seers, the two main ones being Tages, a childlike figure born from tilled land who was immediately gifted with prescience, and Vegoia, a female figure.

The Etruscans believed in intimate contact with divinity. They did nothing without proper consultation with the gods and signs from them. These practices were taken over in total by the Romans.

=== Etrusca Disciplina ===
The Etruscan scriptures were a corpus of texts termed the Etrusca Disciplina. This name appears in Valerius Maximus, and Marcus Tullius Cicero refers to a disciplina in his writings on the subject.

Massimo Pallottino summarizes the scriptures known from other sources to have once existed. The revelations of the prophet Tages (Libri Tagetici, "Tagetic Books") included the theory and rules of divination from animal entrails (Libri Haruspicini, "Haruspical Books") and discussion of the Etruscan afterlife and its attendant rituals (Libri Acherontici, "Acherontic Books"). The revelations of the prophetess Vegoia (Libri Vegoici, "Vegoic Books") included the theory and rules of divination from thunder (brontoscopy) and lightning strikes (Libri Fulgurales, "Fulgural Books") and discussion of religious rituals. Books on rituals (Libri Rituales) included Tages's Acherontic Books as well as other books on omens and prodigies (Libri Ostentaria) and books on fate (Libri Fatales) that detailed the religiously proper ways to found cities, erect shrines, drain fields, formulate laws, and measure space and time.

The Etrusca Disciplina was mainly a set of rules for the conduct of all sorts of divination; Pallottino calls it a religious and political "constitution": it does not dictate what laws shall be made or how humans are to behave, but rather elaborates rules for asking the gods these questions and receiving answers.

=== Priests and officials ===
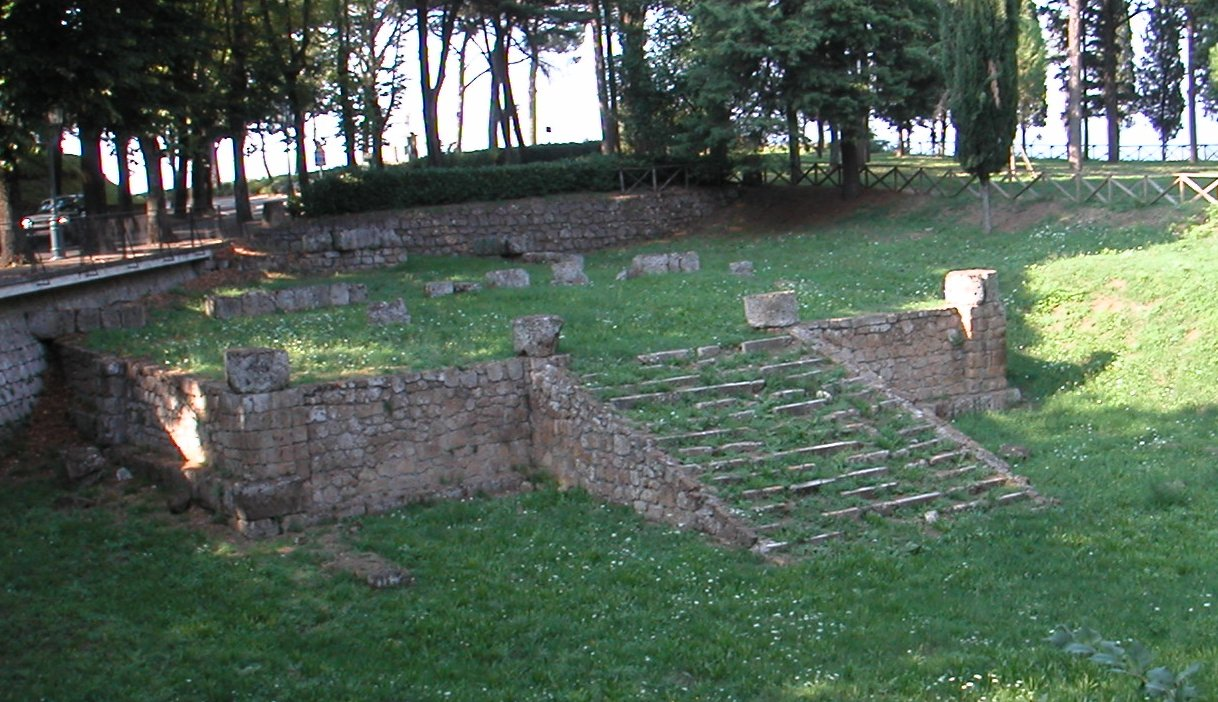
Rare Etruscan fanu located at Orvieto.

Divinatory inquiries according to discipline were conducted by priests whom the Romans called haruspices or sacerdotes; Tarquinii had a college of 60 of them. The Etruscans, as evidenced by the inscriptions, used several words: capen (Sabine cupencus), maru (Umbrian maron-), eisnev, hatrencu (priestess). They called the art of haruspicy ziχ neθsrac.

== Beliefs ==
The polytheistic Etruscan belief system readily adopted gods from other religions, integrating them as important cult deities and adapting their names and aspects of their powers. The Etruscans, Romans, and other native Italic peoples all influenced each other's religious beliefs and practices, with the Romans adopting the practice of haruspicy, and the Etruscans adopting the deities Juno, Minerva, and Neptunus as Uni, Menrua, and Nethuns. Excavations of the sanctuary at Pyrgi have revealed that the goddess Uni was worshipped there. Ancient authors refer to her as Leukotheo or Mater Matuta, and she is equated with the Phoenician goddess Astarte by the Pyrgi Tablets. The most powerful god in the Etruscan pantheon, Tinia/Tin, is Uni's consort. Like Zeus, he wields lightning bolts, although he cannot be entirely conflated with the attributes of Zeus, as he is often depicted as a beardless youth, and has less absolute power. Cthonic and underworld deities were common in the Etruscan pantheon. Two of the most important were Aplu and Fufluns, related to the Greek Apollo and Dionysus. In Etruscan mythology they were brothers, sons of Semele, who was guided out of the underworld by Dionysus. This event was celebrated at the festival Herios at Delphi, and is depicted on a mirror from Vulci, which Aplu also features in.

The Etruscans seem to have believed that deities could be negotiated with through sacrifices and celestial observation. The one surviving Etruscan religious text is the Liber Linteus, found wrapped around the Zagreb mummy. Although only approximately 800 words survive, it appears to be a brontoscopic calendar describing ritual activities. Evidence for Etruscan divinatory practices can also be seen in several artifacts, the most famous of which is the Piacenza liver, a 1st or 2nd century CE bronze model of a sheep's liver, divided into 40 cells which feature the names of gods.There were specific people in Etruscan society who would perform these divinatory duties and were experts in the interpretation of signs. Roman authors, including Livvy, Cicero, and Varro, frequently refer to the Etrusca Disciplina in talking about Etruscan society and religion, which was supposedly a collection of sacred books which gave instructions for communication with the gods through the observation of natural signs, haruspicy, and augury. Two of these books are specifically attributed to the Etruscan prophets Tages and Veogia, who are known from other sources. Publius Nigidius Figulus' (a contemporary of Varro) Latin translation of Tages brontoscopic calendar survives in a Byzantine Greek manuscript.

The Etruscan gods were seen as being heavily connected with places in the natural environment of Etruria. The landscape itself was an integral part of religious worship, as sanctuaries were often built near certain physical features, often those which resulted from the dramatic volcanic activity that formed the native landscape. Boundaries and borderlands were incredibly important in this regard; The boundaries between water and land (banks of rivers) and earth and sky (hills and mountains) were often considered sacred places, ideal for the construction of sanctuaries. Many of these sanctuaries, particularly those near water sources, have been used in some way since the Bronze Age.

=== Spirits and deities ===
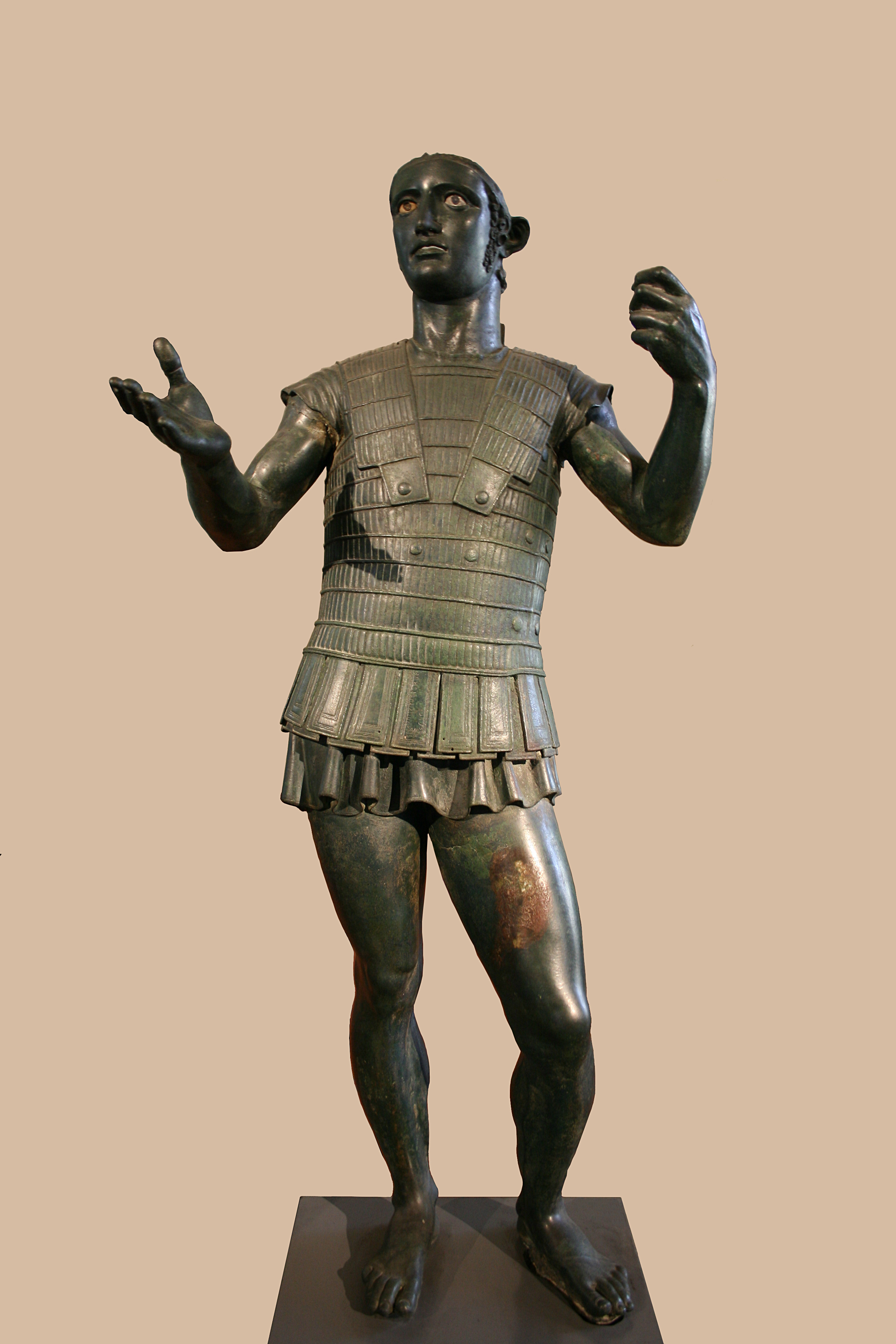
The Mars of Todi, a life-sized Etruscan bronze sculpture of a soldier making a votive offering, most likely to Laran, the Etruscan god of war, late 5th to early 4th century BC

After the 5th century, iconographic depictions show the deceased traveling to the underworld. In several instances of Etruscan art, such as in the François Tomb in Vulci, a spirit of the dead is identified by the term hinthial, literally "(one who is) underneath".

A god was called an ais (later eis), which in the plural is aisar / eisar. The Liber Linteus (column 5, lines 9–10, and elsewhere) seems to distinguish "Gods of Light" aiser si from "Gods of Darkness" aiser seu: nunθene eiser śic śeuc /unuχ mlaχ nunθen χiś esviśc faśe: "Make an offering for both the Gods of Light and of Dark, / for them make an appropriate offering with oil from the Chi and from the Esvi rituals." The abode of a god was a fanu or luth, a sacred place, such as a favi, a grave or temple. There, one would need to make a fler (plural flerchva), or "offering".

Three layers of deities are portrayed in Etruscan art. One appears to be divinities of an indigenous origin: Voltumna or Vertumnus, a primordial, chthonic god; Usil, god(-dess) of the sun; Tivr, god of the moon; Turan, goddess of love; Laran, god of war; Maris, goddess of (child-)birth; Leinth, goddess of death; Selvans, god of the woods; Thalna, goddess (or god) of fertility and childbirth; Turms, god of trade and messenger of the gods; Fufluns, god of wine; the heroic figure Hercle; and a number of underworld deities such as Catha, Lur, Suri, Thanr and Calus (all listed on the Lead Plaque of Magliano and elsewhere.)

Ruling over them were higher deities that seem to reflect the Indo-European system: Tin or Tinia, the sky, Uni his wife (Juno), Nethuns, god of the waters, and Cel, the earth goddess.

As a third layer, the Greek gods and heroes were adopted by the Etruscan system during the Etruscan Orientalizing Period of 750/700–600 BC. Examples are Aritimi (Artemis), Menrva (Minerva, Latin equivalent of Athena), the heroic figure Hercle (Hercules), and Pacha (Bacchus; Latin equivalent of Dionysus), and over time the primary trinity became Tinia, Uni and Menrva. This triad of gods were venerated in Tripartite temples similar to the later Roman Temple of Jupiter Capitolinus.

A fourth group, the so-called dii involuti or "veiled gods", are sometimes mentioned as superior to all the other deities, but these were never worshipped, named, or depicted directly.

=== Afterlife ===
Etruscan beliefs concerning the hereafter appear to be an amalgam of influences. The Etruscans shared general early Mediterranean beliefs, such as the Egyptian belief that survival and prosperity in the hereafter depend on the treatment of the deceased's remains. Etruscan tombs imitated domestic structures and were characterized by spacious chambers, wall paintings and grave furniture. In the tomb, especially on the sarcophagus (examples shown below), was a representation of the deceased in his or her prime, often with a spouse. Not everyone had a sarcophagus; sometimes the deceased was laid out on a stone bench. As the Etruscans practiced mixed inhumation and cremation rites (the proportion depending on the period), cremated ashes and bones might be put into an urn in the shapes of a house or a representation of the deceased.

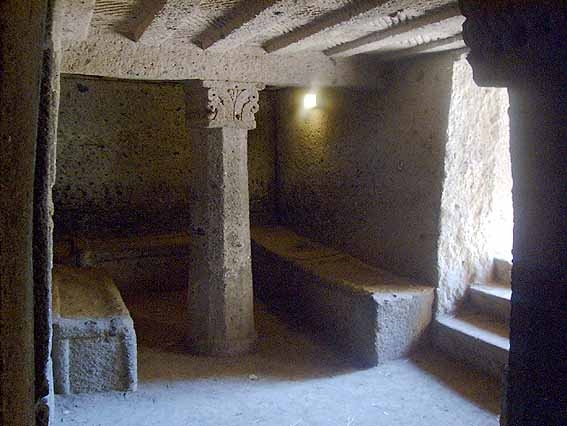
Funerary home at Banditaccia with couches

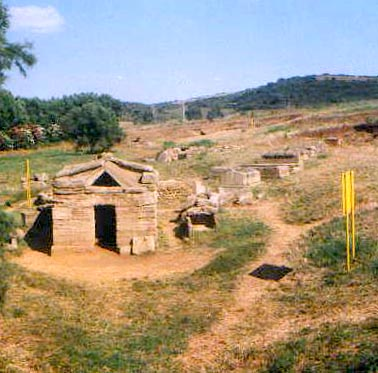
Funerary home at Populonia

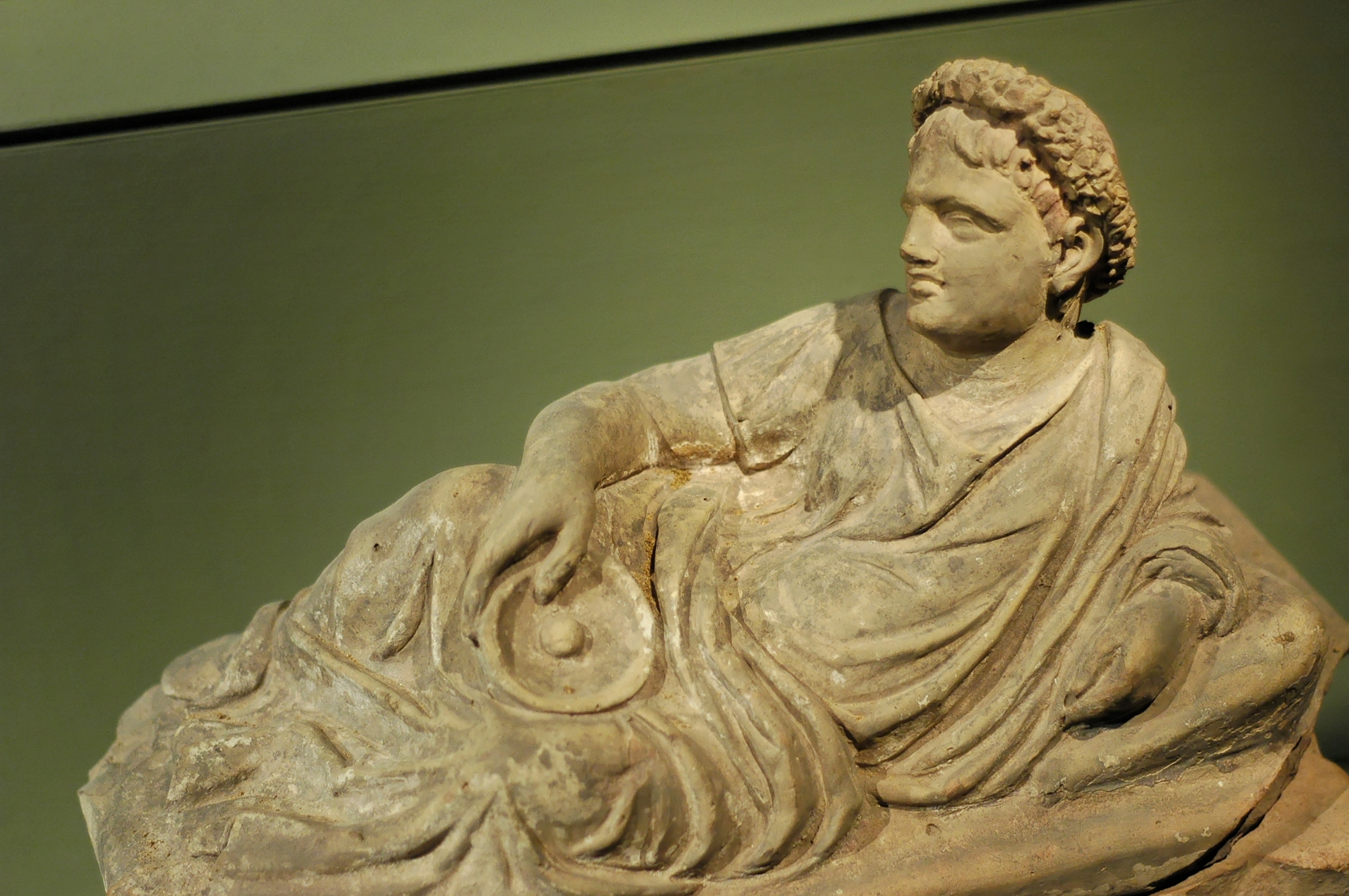
Sarcophagus from Siena

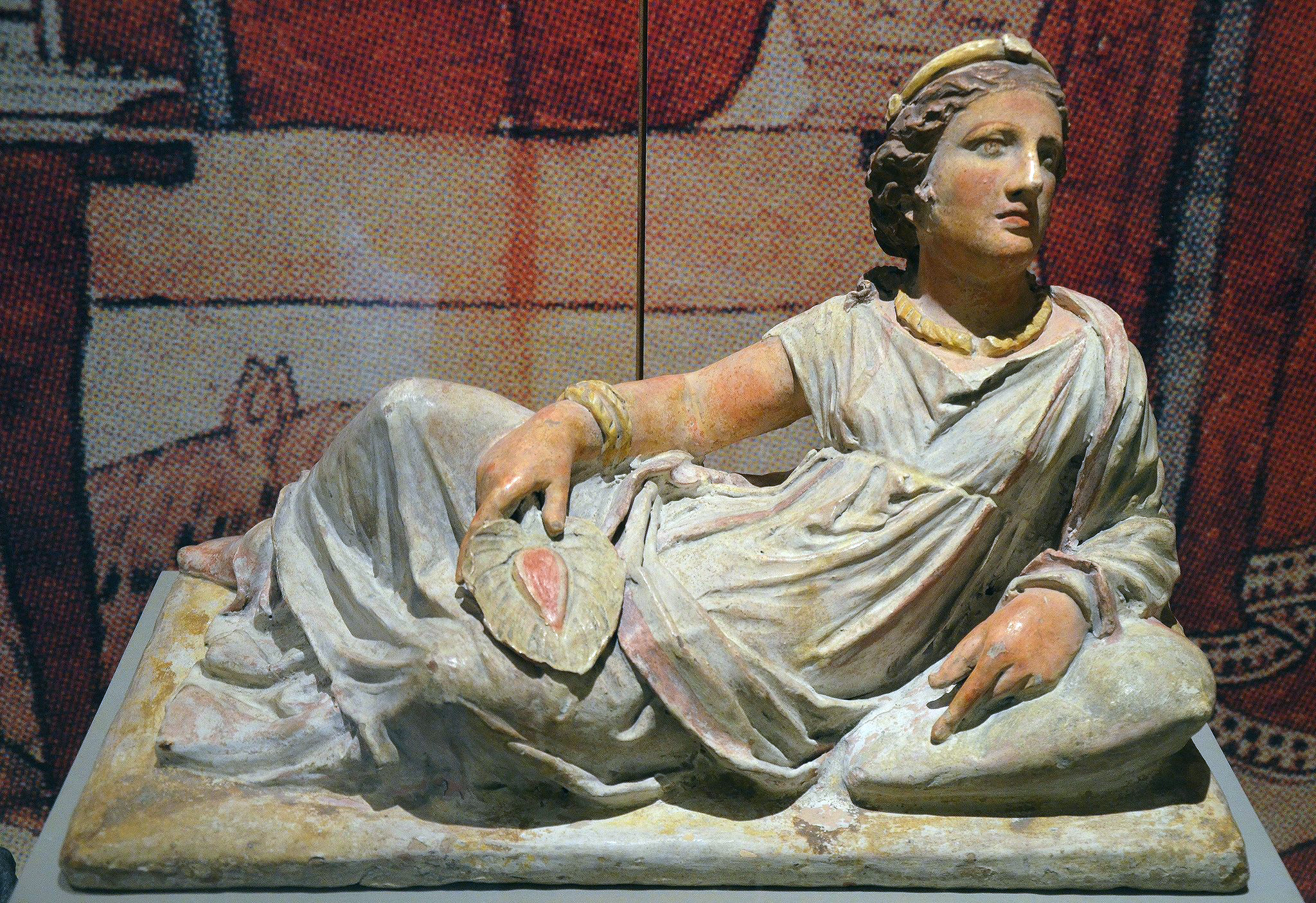
Sarcophagus from Chiusi

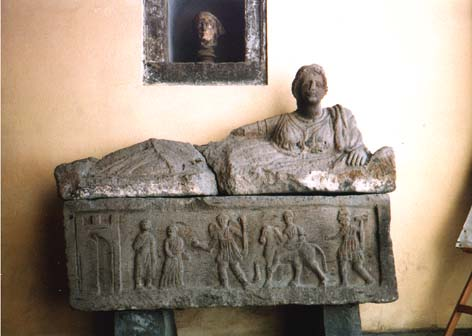
Sarcophagus

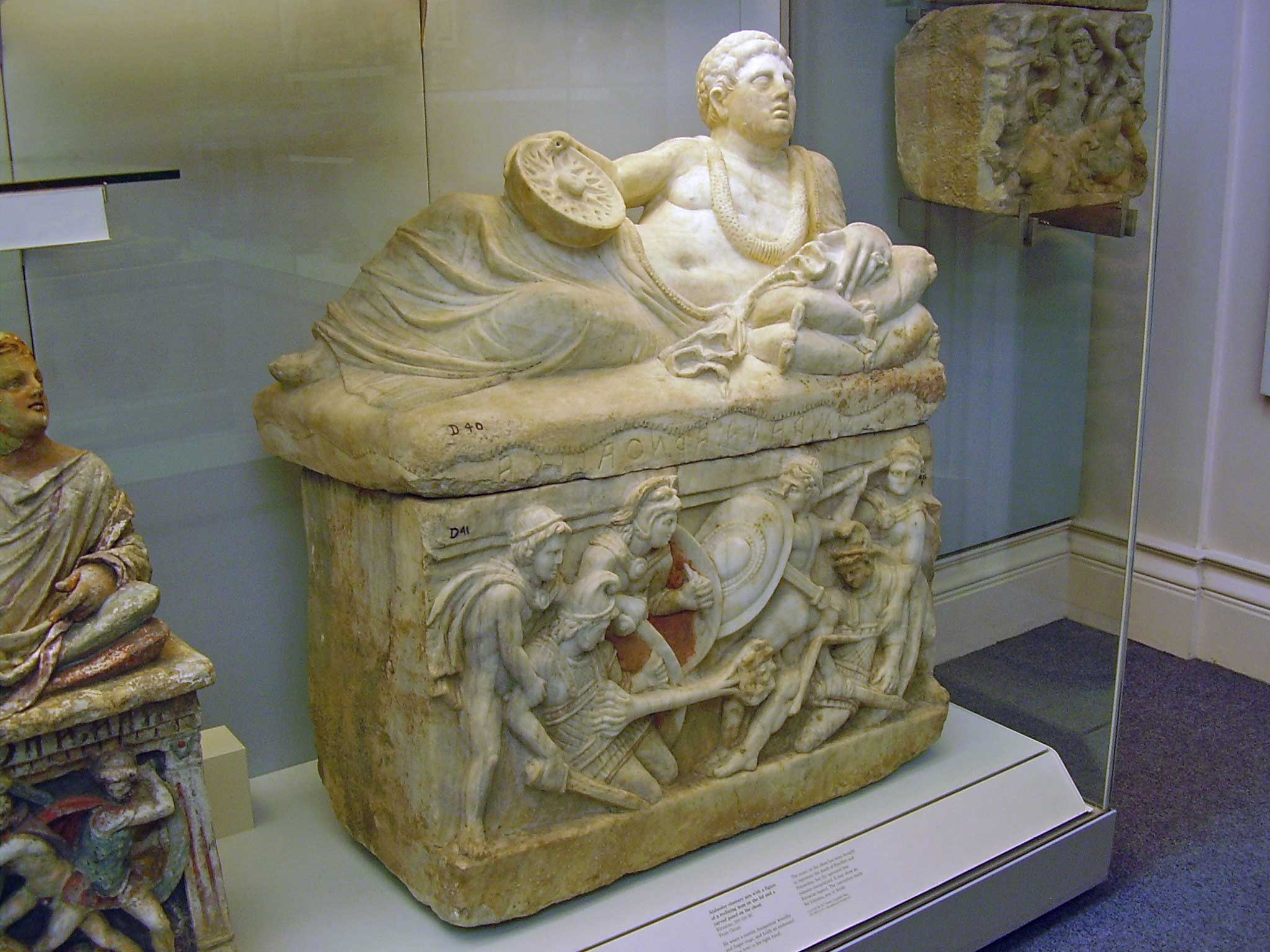
Burial urn

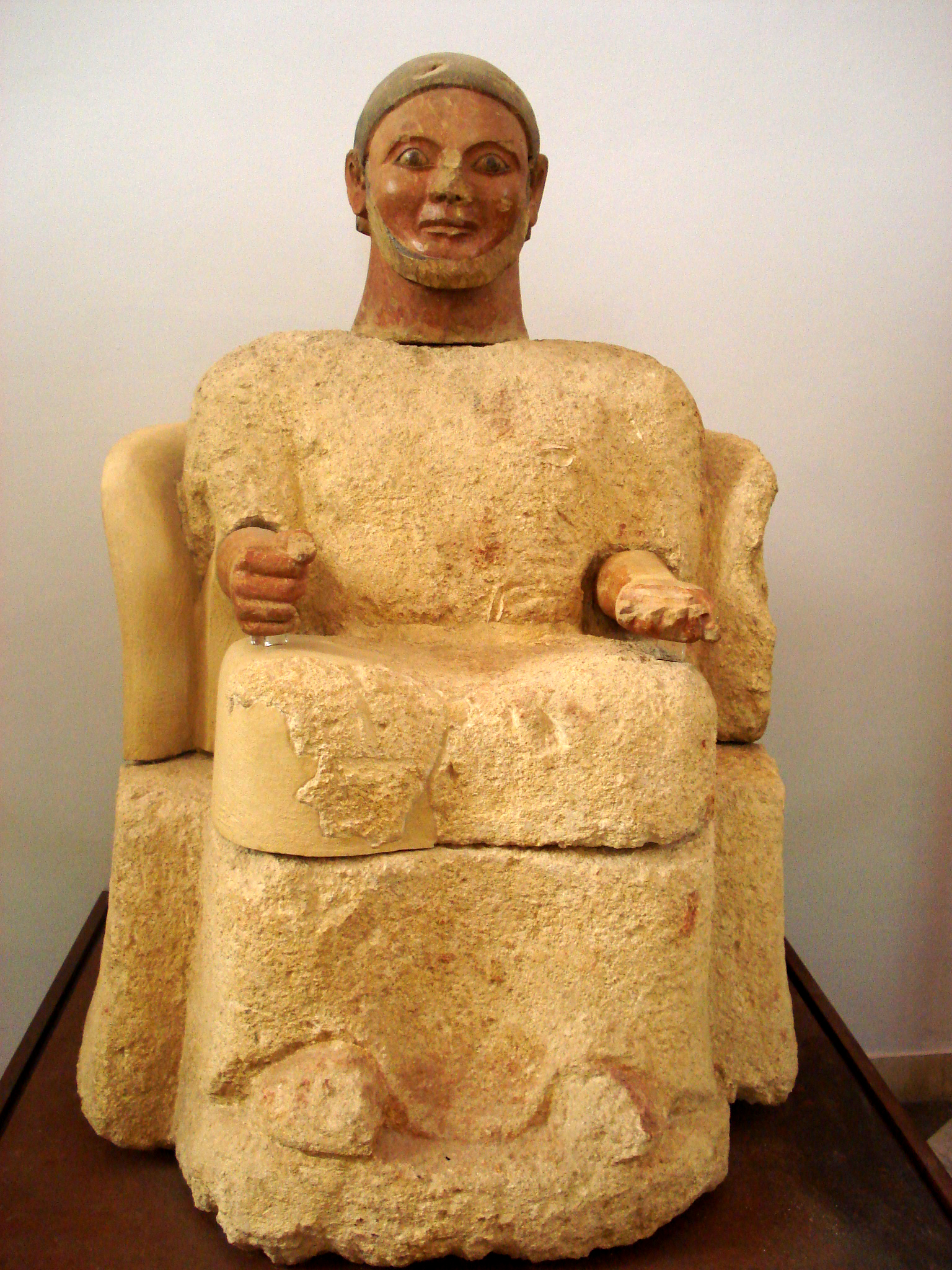
Urn from Chiusi

In addition to the world still influenced by terrestrial affairs was a transmigrational world beyond the grave, patterned after the Greek Hades. It was ruled by Aita, and the deceased was guided there by Charun, the equivalent of Death, who was blue and wielded a hammer. The Etruscan Hades was populated by Greek mythological figures and a few such as Tuchulcha, of composite appearance.

== Women in Etruscan religion ==
Women in Ancient Etruria enjoyed more social liberties than their Roman counterparts until the Roman absorption of Etruria and the consequential assimilation into it. For example, the husband and wife often stood alongside each other in representations, and women were portrayed on sarcophagi in the same ceremonial feasts that men were. Etruscan women also participated in an array of religious activities, which can be observed through archaeological evidence of votive offerings, ceremonial textile production, and iconography found in Etruscan burials.

=== Worship ===
There is rich evidence for Etruscan worship in the form of votives, mostly made from bronze and terracotta, which provide insight into how different groups of people worshipped deities in Etruria. The physical form of these votives, their location, and the presence of an inscription, often with the name of the deity to which they are being dedicated, can illuminate how individuals worshipped and participated in religious life. Women's votive offerings are particularly interesting; they included terracotta or bronze statuettes, items related to textile production, such as spindle whorls or spools, and anatomical votives, including wombs. The large number of womb votives have been of particular interest to scholars in ascertaining the anatomical knowledge of the Etruscans and their conceptualization of fertility, pregnancy, and uterine pathologies. Items related to textile production found in votive and religious contexts may indicate that textile creation was an important part of religious life for women, perhaps even in the context of making ceremonial textiles. Votive inscriptions are found on some of the objects deposited in sanctuaries, and although those written by women comprise only about one-sixth of votive inscriptions from the Etruscan period, they provide valuable information about the status of women and freedpeople in Etruria, and their relationship to public and private religion.

An inscribed bronze statue base dating to the Archaic period (525-500 BCE) was excavated at Campo della Fiera in Orvieto, Italy, and provides evidence of an affluent woman's offering to a deity. The statue's inscription reads that it is a dedication to a deity, or group of deities, named- Tlusχval, from Kanuta.

kanuta larecenas laute/niθa aranθia pinies puia turuce

tlusχval marveθul faliaθ/ere

The term lauteniθa means "freedwoman" and is by far the earliest epigraphical instance of this word. It is preceded by the word larcenas, in the genitive case, which is the family name of the person to whom she was enslaved. This name appears Etruscan in origin, however, Kanuta's own name could have Italic-Oscan roots. Etruscan inscriptional evidence for freepeople dramatically increases at the end of the Archaic period and after, likely a consequence of the immense spread of chattel slavery in Italy following the Second Punic War. This increase in epigraphic evidence may have also been the result of changing social and governmental hierarchies, as the Etruscans moved away from solely monarchical rule. This inscription confirms that affluent Etruscan women were able to dedicate votives at religious sites freely, showcasing their wealth and testifying to women's social freedoms in ancient Etruria. Etruscan sanctuaries also reveal evidence for the dedication of anatomical votives. Models of body parts such as the uterus were often offered to divinities, likely in relation to concerns revolving around childbirth and fertility.

Another important inscription connected to women's religious worship comes from the later Etruscan period. A kylix dating to the late fourth or early fifth century BCE was found in Gravisca, Tarquinia, in a sanctuary seemingly associated with female fertility during the Etruscan period, as evidenced by the votive objects and inscriptions.This kylix bears an inscription to the goddess Turun/Turan that reads: turns turce ramθa ve-ṇatres, “(Possession) of Turun/Turan. Ramtha Venatres gave (this).” Turun was one of the most frequently invoked deities in the inscriptions at this site, and based on epigraphical and artistic evidence, seems to be a fertility deity with similar attributes to the Greek Aphrodite.

Some scholars suggest there was a link between women's production of textiles/ceremonial textiles and ritual at Etruscan sanctuaries. Recent excavations at the Poggio Colla archaeological site near Vicchio, Italy have revealed what may be a link between the location of excavated spindle whorls, spools, and ritual activity due to their location. The artifacts were found on the northern sides of the acropolis, near where defensive walls were later built. Scholars have speculated that this may be due to a form of obliteration in which the artifacts were linked to their deposition in a sacred way.

=== Priestesses ===
In speculation on the existence of an Etruscan priestess, the hatrencu is the most widely discussed term in scholarly communities. The term hatrencu was found in the inscriptions from a tomb in Vulci, a formerly Etruscan town in central Italy.

The tomb is especially significant in that it contains a group of women buried together, which deviates from normal Etruscan burial rituals of men and women. The status of the hatrencu as an Etruscan priestess is widely debated by scholars. While many scholars assert that due to the abnormal burial conditions and the obscure term usage in the inscription, the hatrencu represents a priestess, other scholars disagree with these conclusions. There is also debate on whether the iconography of the tombs points to the women buried being associated with ritual objects, with a cista in the tomb of a woman named Ramtha as an example, however the female depictions could just as easily be divinities associated with funerary culture.

The role of the hatrencu is thought to be similar to that of the Roman college of matrons, which was dedicated to the worship of the goddess Mater Matuta. Such a comparison underscores the possible ritual and social functions that hatrencu may have held in Etruscan society. Whether there were female religious specialists such as Etruscan priestess in Etruria, is mainly speculation and is subject to ongoing academic debate.

== See also ==
- Interpretatio graeca
- List of Etruscan mythological figures
- List of Etruscan names for Greek heroes
- Liber Linteus
- Daily life of the Etruscans
