= Liber Linteus =

Manuscript in Etruscan language

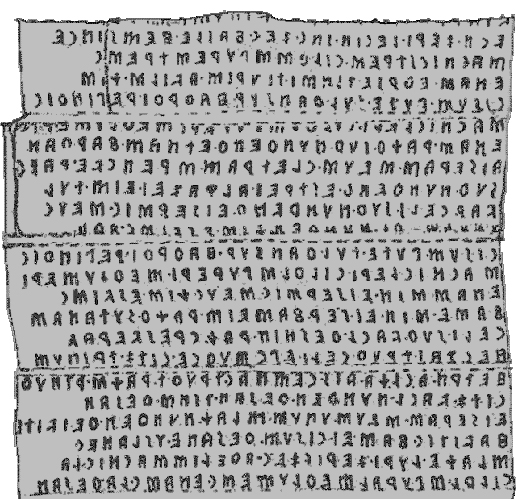
- Material: Linen
- Created: 3rd century BC
- Discovered: 1867; Zagreb, Croatia
- Present location: Zagreb, Croatia
- Language: Etruscan

The Liber Linteus Zagrabiensis (Latin for "Linen Book of Zagreb", also known rarely as Liber Agramensis, "Book of Agram") is the longest Etruscan text and the only extant linen book (libri lintei), dated to the 3rd century BC, making it arguably the oldest extant European book. (The second longest Etruscan text, Tabula Capuana, also seems to be a ritual calendar.) Much of it is untranslated because of the lack of knowledge about the Etruscan language, though the words and phrases which can be understood indicate that the text is most likely a ritual calendar. Miles Beckwith (2008) states with regard to this text that "in the last thirty or forty years, our understanding of Etruscan has increased substantially," and L. B. van der Meer has published a word-by-word analysis of the entire text.

The fabric of the book was preserved when it was used for mummy wrappings in Ptolemaic Egypt. The mummy was bought in Alexandria in 1848 and since 1867 both the mummy and the manuscript have been kept in Zagreb, Croatia, now in a refrigerated room at the Archaeological Museum.

== History of discovery ==
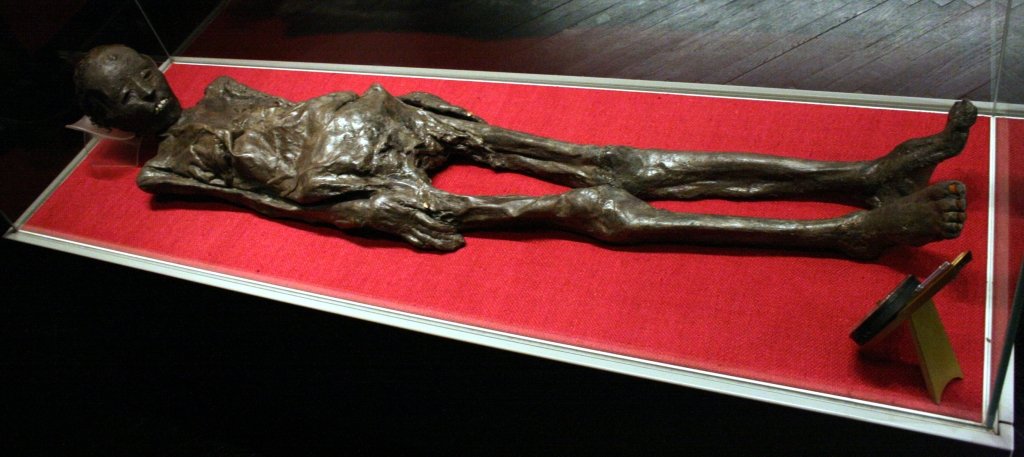
Mummy at the Archaeological Museum in Zagreb.

In 1848, Mihajlo Barić (1791–1859), a low ranking Croatian official in the Hungarian Royal Chancellery, resigned his post and embarked upon a tour of several countries, including Egypt. While there, he purchased a female mummy, as a souvenir of his travels. Barić displayed the mummy at his home in Vienna, standing it upright in the corner of his sitting room. At some point he removed the linen wrappings and put them on display in a separate glass case, though it seems he had never noticed the inscriptions or their importance.

The mummy remained on display at his home until his death in 1859, when it passed into possession of his brother Ilija, a priest in Slavonia. As he took no interest in the mummy, he donated it in 1867 to the State Institute of Croatia, Slavonia, and Dalmatia in Zagreb (the present-day Archaeological Museum in Zagreb). Their catalogue described it as follows:

Mummy of a young woman (with wrappings removed) standing in a glass case and held upright by an iron rod. Another glass case contains the mummy's bandages which are completely covered with writing in an unknown and hitherto undeciphered language, representing an outstanding treasure of the National Museum.

The mummy and its wrappings were examined the same year by the German Egyptologist Heinrich Brugsch, who noticed the text, but believed them to be Egyptian hieroglyphs. He did not undertake any further research on the text, until 1877, when a chance conversation with Richard Burton about runes made him realise that the writing was not Egyptian. They realised the text was potentially important, but wrongly concluded that it was a transliteration of the Egyptian Book of the Dead in the Arabic script.

In 1891, the wrappings were transported to Vienna, where they were thoroughly examined by Jakob Krall, an expert on the Coptic language, who expected the writing to be either Coptic, Libyan or Carian. In 1892, Krall was the first to identify the language as Etruscan and reassemble the strips. It was his work that established that the linen wrappings constituted a manuscript written in Etruscan.

At first, the provenance and identity of the mummy were unknown, due to the irregular nature of its excavation and sale. This resulted in speculation that the mummy may have had some association with either the Liber Linteus or the Etruscans. A papyrus found within her sarcophagus was identified as an Egyptian Book of the Dead, which included the details of an Egyptian woman named Nesi-hensu, the wife of Paher-hensu, a tailor from Thebes. This discovery has been used as evidence to suggest that the mummy is the Nesi-hensu mentioned on the papyrus. However, later analysis of the papyrus has suggested that it postdates the mummy by nearly a century, which could suggest that the mummy is not Nesi-hensu.

She was 30–40 years old at the time of her death, and wore a necklace, with traces of flowers and gold in her hair. Among the fragments of the accompanying wreath, there was a cat skull.

== Text ==
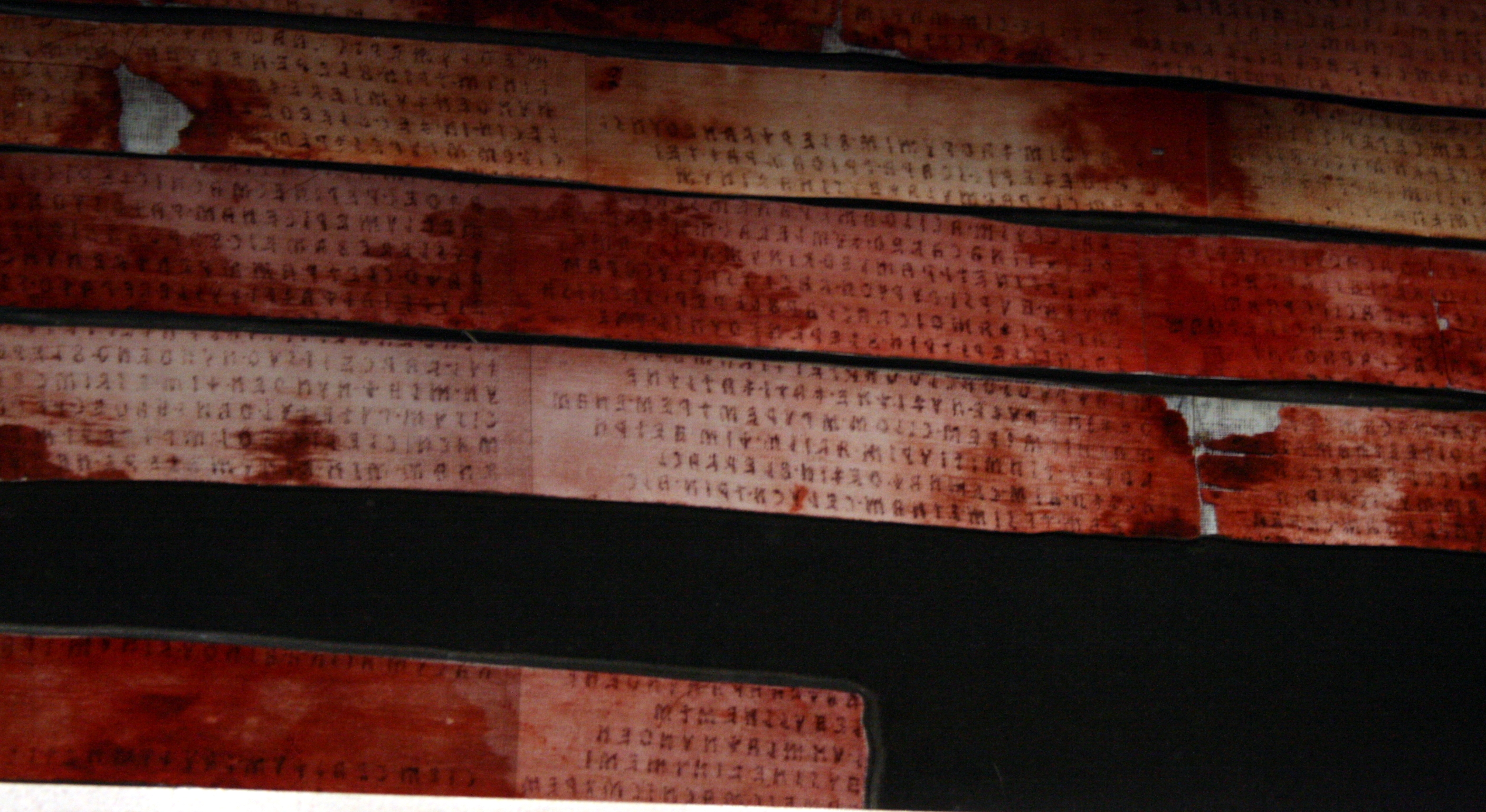
Liber Linteus Zagrebiensis.

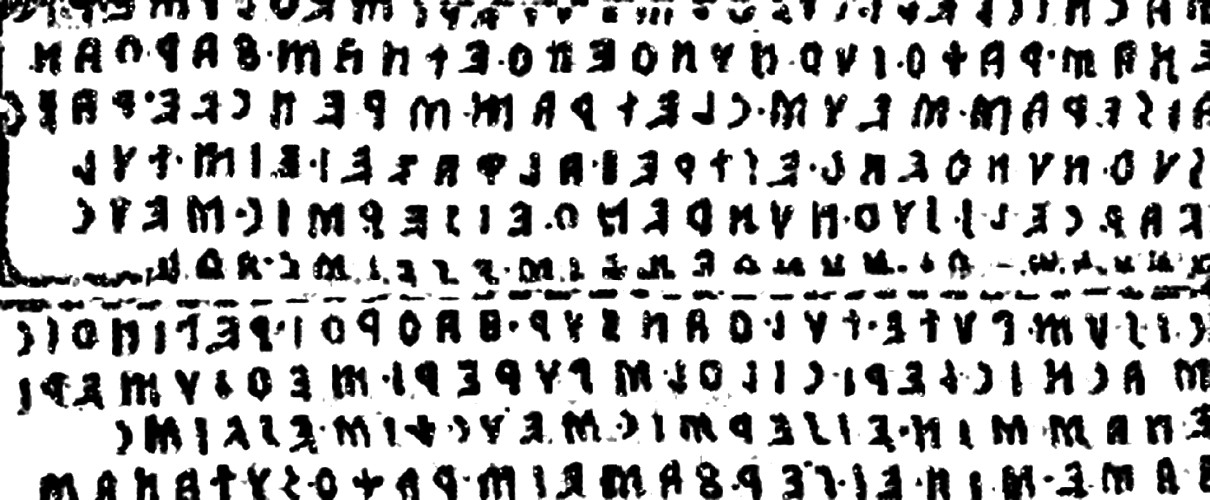
A sample of text from Liber Linteus Zagrebiensis.

=== Date and origin ===
On paleographic grounds, the manuscript is dated to approximately 250 BC (though carbon dating put manufacture of the linen textile itself at 390 BC +/- 45 years). Certain local gods mentioned within the text allow the Liber Linteus's place of production to be narrowed to a small area in the southeast of Tuscany near Lake Trasimeno, where four major Etruscan cities were located: modern day Arezzo, Perugia, Chiusi and Cortona.

=== Structure ===
The book is laid out in twelve columns from right to left, each one representing a "page". Much of the first three columns is missing, and it is not known where the book begins. Closer to the end of the book the text is almost complete (there is a strip missing that runs the entire length of the book). By the end of the last page the cloth is blank and the selvage is intact, showing the definite end of the book.

There are 230 lines of text, with 1330 legible words, but only about 500 distinct words or roots. Only about 60% of the text is thought to have been preserved. Black ink has been used for the main text, and red ink for lines and diacritics.

In use, it would have been folded so that one page lay on top of another like a codex, rather than being wound along like a scroll. Julius Caesar is said to have folded scrolls in similar accordion fashion while on campaigns.

=== Content ===
Though the Etruscan language is not fully understood, many words and phrases can be deciphered, enough to give an indication of the subject matter. Both dates and the names of gods are found throughout the text, giving the impression that the book is a religious calendar. Such calendars are known from the Roman world, giving not only the dates of ceremonies and processions, but also the rituals and liturgies involved. The lost Etrusca disciplina are referred to by several Roman antiquarians.

The theory that this is a religious text is strengthened by recurring words and phrases that are surmised to have liturgical or dedicatory meanings. Some notable formulae on the Liber Linteus include a hymn-like repetition of ceia hia in column 7, and variations on the phrase śacnicstreś cilθś śpureśtreśc enaś, which is translated by van der Meer as "by the sacred fraternity/priesthood of cilθ, and by the civitas of enaś".

Though many of the specific details of the rituals are unclear, they seem to have been performed outside cities, sometimes near specific rivers, sometimes on (or at least for) hilltops/citadels, sometimes apparently in cemeteries. Based on the two unambiguous dates that survive — June 18 in 6.14 and September 24 in 8.2 — it is supposed that roughly columns 1-5 deal with rituals occurring in the months before June (probably starting in March, and perhaps there was introductory or other material here as well), column 6 with June rituals, column 7 may refer to rituals in July and possibly August, column 8 September rituals, and 9-12 concerning rites to be performed from October through February. Other numbers are mentioned which are probably also dates, but as the months are not indicated, we cannot be sure where exactly they fall in the year.

Throughout this calendar there is also a fairly clear progression of which kinds of deities are to be propitiated in which months and seasons. Only two individual gods are set off by being preceded by the term farθan fleres, probably "the Genius (or Father?) of the spirit of/in..." These are Crap- and Neθuns, the first probably equivalent to Tin, the Etruscan Jupiter, and the second roughly equivalent to Latin Neptune. It is notable that Crap-/Jupiter is mentioned in the first half of the text (in columns 3, 4, and 6), that is, up to June (specifically before the summer solstice on June 21), but he is not ever mentioned later in the calendar (as far as we can see in the text that is legible). On the other hand, Neθuns/Neptune does not occur (again, as far as we can see) in these earlier passages/months/seasons, but only after the autumnal equinox on September 21 (specifically just after September 24, mentioned in 8.3, then also 8.11, 9.18 and 9.22).

Similarly, on the one hand, other deities of light, such as θesan "Dawn" and Lusa are only mentioned in the earlier part of the calendar: θesan at 5.19-20 θesan tini θesan eiseraś śeuś probably "Dawn of (bright) Jupiter (and) Dawn of the Dark Deities," (probably referring to Venus as morning and evening star) and Lusa at 6.9; while, on the other hand, various terms thought or known to refer to specifically underworld deities exclusively appear later in the calendar: Satrs "Saturn/Cronos" (11.f4), Caθ- (in columns 10 and 12), Ceu- (at 7.8), Velθa (7, 10, and 11), and Veive-/Vetis = Latin Veiovis/Vedius, (described by van der Meer as an "underworld Jupiter") in 10 and 11.

But some of the apparent underworld deities, such as Zer, show up in both halves (4, 5, 9), while Lur, also thought to be chthonic, only appears in columns 5 and 6. van der Meer claims that many of the locations in the year of these deities' rituals correspond to the same deities' locations on the Liver of Piacenza and in other Etruscan sources that hint at how they divided the heavens or the divine realm. On the other hand, Belfiore considers Crap to be an underworld deity.

There are a variety of types of ritual (the general term for which seems to be eis-na/ ais-na literally "for the gods, divine (act)") described in the text. The most frequently mentioned include vacl, probably "libation", usually of vinum "wine" (sometimes specifically "new wine") but also of oil faś and other liquids whose identities are unclear; nunθen "invoke" or possibly "offer (with an invocation)"; θez- probably "sacrifice" but possibly "to present" sacrifice(s) or offering(s) (fler(χva)) often of zusle(va) "piglet(s)" (or perhaps some other animal). Offerings and sacrifices were placed: on the right and/or left hamΦeś leiveś (and variations thereof); on fire raχθ; on a stone (altar?) luθt(i); on the ground cel-i; or with/on a decorated (?) litter cletram śrenχve among others. They were often performed three times ci-s-um/ci-z and often happened or were concluded during the morning cla θesan (a term that seems to mark the end of rituals in this text, since blank lines follow it, followed by a new (partial or complete) date). Column 7 (July and/or August?) may be devoted to describing a series of funereal rites connected to the Adonia festival ritually mourning the death of Aphrodite's lover Adonis.

A variety of types of priest, cepen, (but notably not civil authorities) are mentioned, but the exact distinctions between them are not completely clear: tutin "of the village"(?); ceren, θaurχ both "of the tomb"; cilθ-l/cva "of the citadel(s)/hiltop(s)". Less clear are the kinds of priest indicated by the following (if they refer to priests at all): zec, zac, sve, θe, cluctra, flanaχ, χuru ("arch-"?), snuiuΦ ("permanent"?), cnticn- ('"ad hoc"?), truθur ("omen interpreter from lightening"?), peθereni ("of the god Peθan"?), saucsaθ ([priest] or [holy area]"of the god Saucne") at 3.15 (3.15-3.17): vacl . an . ścanince . saucsaθ . persin / cletram . śrenχve . iχ . ścanince . ciz . vacl / ara roughly "The libation which was poured to Sauc- Pers- (should be performed) with the decorated litter just as it had been poured (before); perform the libation three times."

This seems to present a notable connection between the Liber Linteus and the second longest Etruscan text which happens to also be a ritual calendar, the Tabula Capuana (line 2), since the root sauc- seems to occur in both with the root vacl "libation" and also in a part of each text that probably corresponds to March (though that month is not directly named in any obvious way in either text).

=== Short sample of the text and partial translation ===
Column 3, strip C (There are no punctuation marks in the original beyond interpuncts between most words. Those provided here are to make it easier to match the original with the translation.)

12 [fl]er, etnam tesim, etnam c[elucn],
13 cletram śren-χve. trin: θezi-ne χim fler
14 tarc. mutin um anancveś; nac cal tarc
15 θezi. vacl an ścanince saucsaθ . persin
16 cletram śrenχve iχ ścanince. clt vacl
17 ar-a. nunθene śaθ-aś, naχve heχz, male.

A tentative partial translation: "The sacrifice, be it funerary, [or] be it chthonic [is to be put] on the decorated litter. [Then] say: 'The sacrifice and the dog(?) are presented as the offering.' And collect the goblets; and then present the puppy(?) and the dog(?). The libation that was poured in the [sacred area] of Saucne Persi [should be poured] just as it was poured on the decorated litter. Make the libation three times. Make the offering [as it has been] established, carry [it] out as is appropriate, [and] observe [the appropriate rituals](?)."

Notes: Persi may refer to Perugia whose ancient name was Perusia. The last word, male is related to the well-attested Etruscan words for "mirror": mal(e)na and malstria.
