= Turan (mythology) =

Etruscan goddess of love and fertility

- Goddess of Love, Beauty, and Vitality
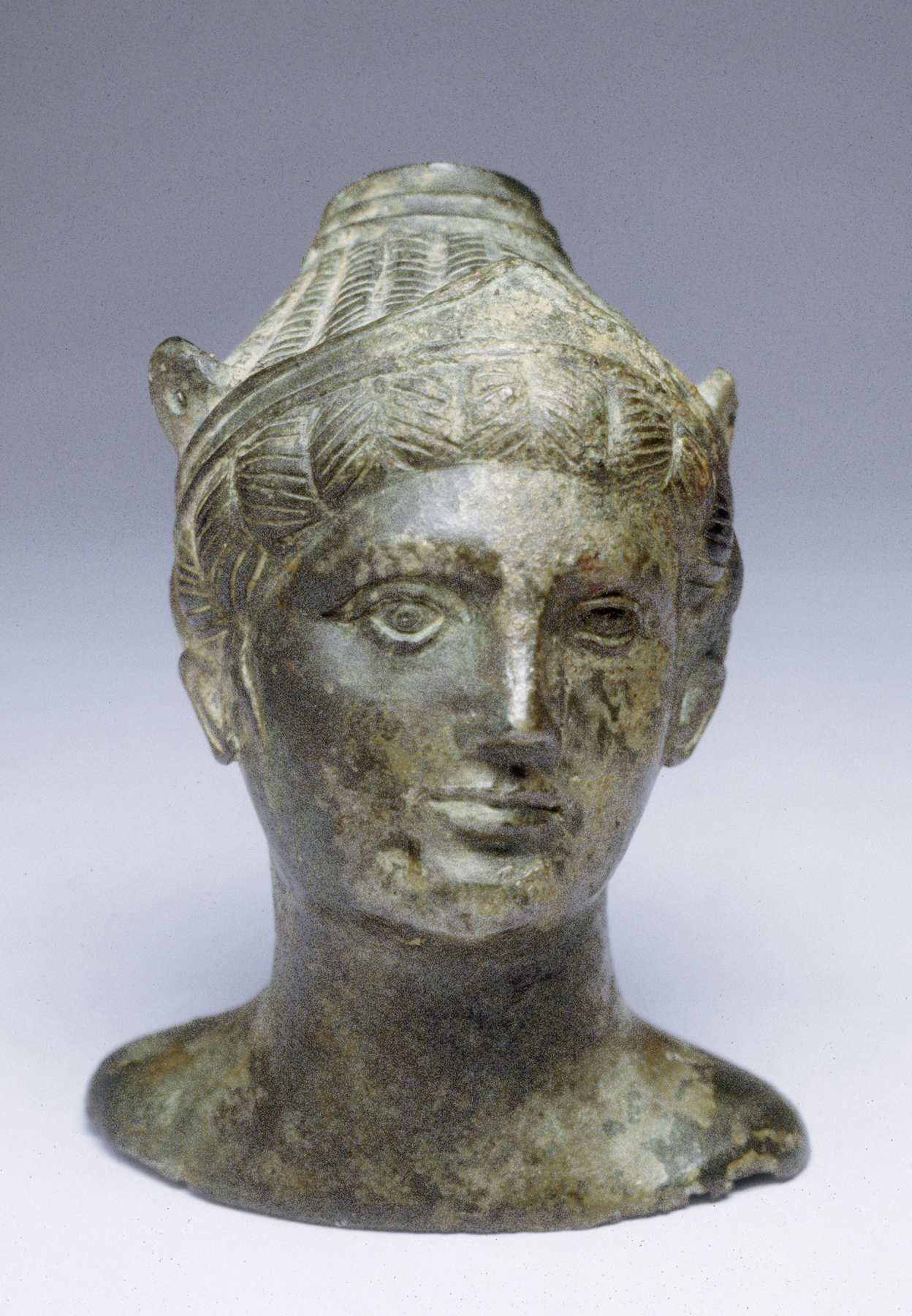
- Balsamarium possibly depicting Turan, or perhaps one of the Lasas (Walters Art Museum)
- Animals: Dove, Swan, Goose
- Symbols: Rose, myrtle, mirrors, perfume jars, jewelry

Genealogy
- Consort: Atunis, Laran
- Children: Turnu

Equivalents
- Greek: Aphrodite
- Roman: Venus

In ancient Etruscan religion, Turan was the goddess of love, fertility and vitality, and patroness of the city of Velch. She was identified with the Roman goddess Venus and the Greek goddess Aphrodite. She was the mother of Turnu, the Etruscan god of love and desire and equivalent of the Greek Eros and the Roman Cupid.

She was one of the three most important female figures in Etruscan mythology, alongside Uni and Menrva. Her image was commonly represented in the backgrounds of mirrors, terracotta panels, vases, and sculptures.

== Depiction ==
In art, Turan was generally depicted as a young, beautiful, attractive, and winged woman. Her beauty was accentuated by curls and elaborate hairstyles. In some representations, she wore diadems and other accessories that denoted her divinity. Turan appears in toilette scenes of Etruscan bronze mirrors. She is richly robed and jeweled in early and late depictions, but appears nude and semi-naked, embodying purity and sensuality. under the influence of Hellenistic art in the 3rd and 2nd centuries BCE. She is paired with her young lover Atunis (Adonis) and figures in the episode of the Judgement of Paris. A mirror from the late fourth century BCE shows the Trojan prince Paris (called Elacsantre in Etruscan) seated on a rock, while the three goddesses appear before him. The goddesses are depicted with elaborate clothing and distinctive accessories, such as diadems and wings. Elacsantre (Paris's Etruscan equivalent) chose Turan as the most beautiful goddess.

Turan personified nature's ability to create life, being the source of passion and desire in Etruscan mythology. She represents the force of life and desire in all its manifestations. She is the representation of the power of love, both in the romantic and sexual spheres. Turan is an ideal of fecundity and prosperity. This personification goes beyond human reproduction, encompassing the fertility of the earth, abundance, and the cycle of life in general.

The goddess idealizes vital energy, strength, and vigor. She is the representation of the joy of living and the drive that propels existence.

The discovery of the inscription "Turan ati" ("Mother Turan") suggests that she was also an ideal of motherhood and a protective maternal figure, just like her Roman equivalent, Venus Genetrix. Like Aphrodite and Venus, Turan is idealized as the goddess of beauty and charm, associated with perfect form and seduction. Turan is the personification of the creative energy of life, of youthful love as well as golden love and fertility, representing the most vital and pleasurable aspects of existence for the Etruscan civilization, protector of beauty and love.

As the goddess of love and beauty, her image was ideal for engraving on the back of mirrors. Scenes with the goddess were painted on tomb walls, demonstrating the importance of love and fertility in life and death. The goddess was often depicted with her young lover, Atunis, who corresponds to the Greek Adonis. Turan was often accompanied by the Lasas, minor winged deities who served as her attendants. In some depictions, Turan was the consort of the war god Laran. In the "Judgment of Paris" episode in Etruscan art, Turan was shown alongside the goddesses Uni (Juno) and Menrva (Minerva). She also appeared with other gods in various mythological scenes, especially in bronze mirror decorations. She was a popular deity, often represented in artifacts and reliefs.

== Attributes ==
Turan was commonly associated with birds such as the dove, goose and above all the swan, Tusna, "the swan of Turan". Her retinue were called Lasas. Turan may be quite ancient but does not appear on the Piacenza list nor in Martianus' list of Etruscan deities. The Etruscan month of July was named after her, although we only know the Latin word for it, Traneus.

== Etymology ==
Turan was seen as the equivalent to the Roman Venus and the Greek Aphrodite. Her name is the pre-Hellenic root of "Turannos" (absolute ruler, see tyrant), so Turan can be viewed as "madam", "mistress" or "lover".

Turan had a sanctuary in the Greek-influenced Gravisca, the port for Tarquinia, where votive gifts inscribed with her name have been found. One inscription calls her Turan ati, "Mother Turan" which has been interpreted as connecting her to Venus Genetrix, Venus the mother of Aeneas and progenitor of the Julio-Claudian lineage.

== Legacy ==
Turan is one of the few Etruscan goddesses who has survived into Italian folklore from Romagna. Called "Turanna", she is said to be a fairy, a spirit of love and happiness, who helps lovers.
