= Maris (mythology) =

Etruscan deity

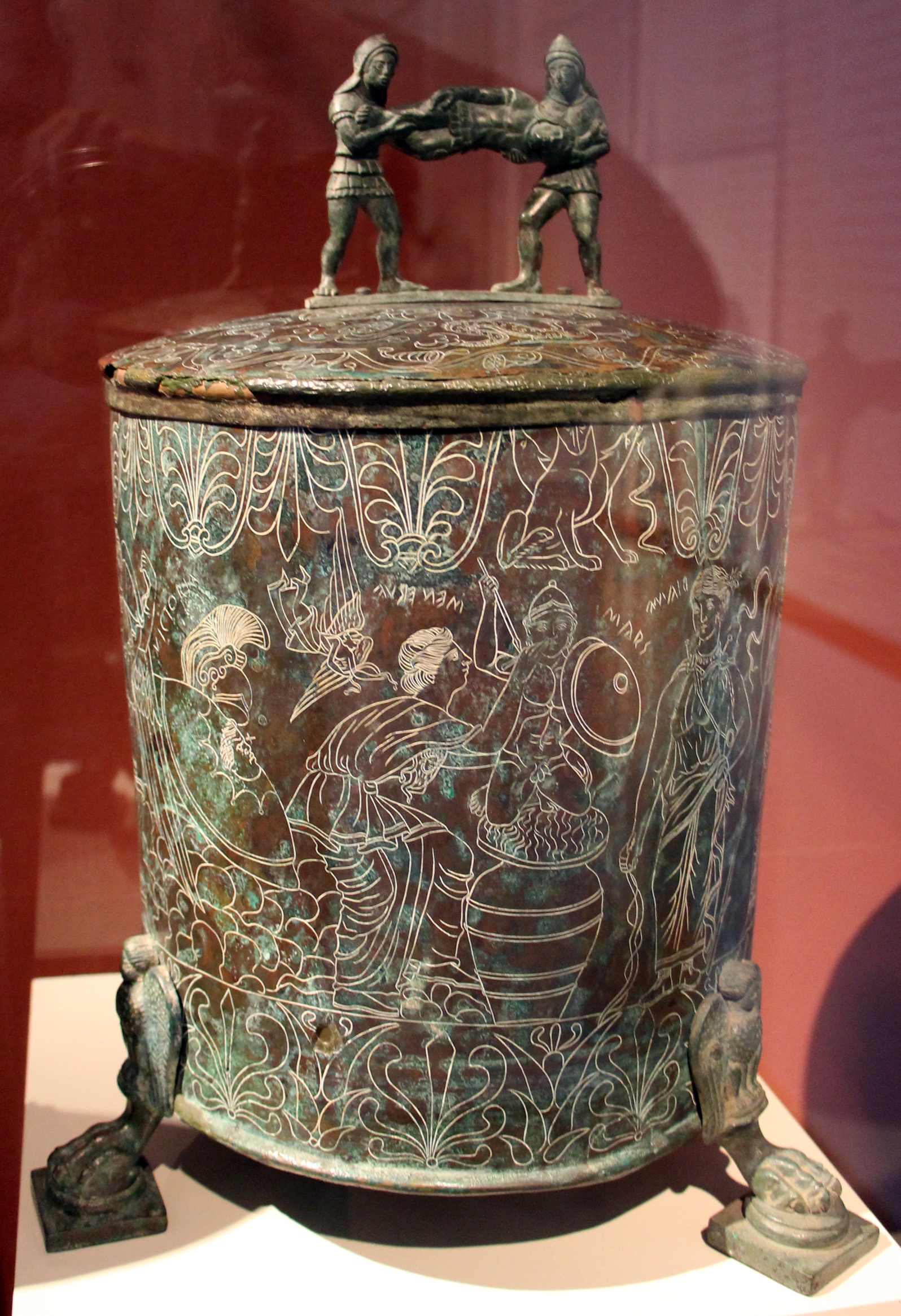
Etruscan cista depicting the immersion of Maris. Or more likely the god’s liberation from the Alodae by Diana and Minerva

Maris (or Mariś) was an Etruscan god often depicted as an infant or child and given many epithets, including Mariś Halna, Mariś Husrnana ("Maris the Child"), and Mariś Isminthians. He was the son of Hercle, the Etruscan equivalent of Heracles. On two bronze mirrors, Maris appears in scenes depicting an immersion rite presumably to ensure his immortality. Massimo Pallottino noted that Maris might have been connected to stories about the centaur Mares, the legendary ancestor of the Ausones, who underwent a triple death and resurrection.

== Influence on Mars ==
Some scholars think he influenced Roman conceptions of the god Mars, but this is not universally held; more likely he was the god of fertility and love, similar to the Greek god Eros.

== Maris the Maker ==
In the Lead Plaque of Magliano, he is called Maris Menita "Maris the Maker", the full dedicatory line translated:

For Maris Menita (="the Maker"), for the ancestors, also this previously mentioned annually appointed village-priest must make a dedication in the ciala, and in addition in the place of offering, and in the ichu house
