= Epiur =

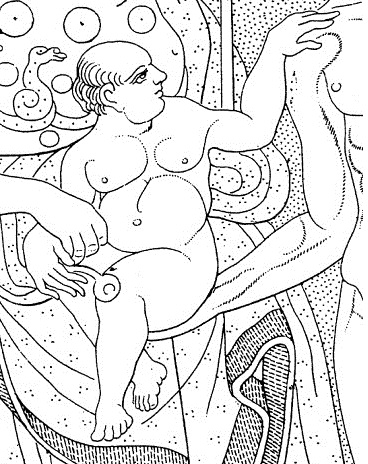

In-universe information
- Gender: Male
- Nationality: Etruscan

Epiur is an Etruscan mythological figure that appears on bronze Etruscan engraved mirrors. He is shown as an infant that has the face of a young man. He is also often winged and being held by Hercle or Menrva, who are charged with the protection and care of infants. He is also often shown to be presented to other gods.

== Name Dispute ==
The meaning of and derivation of the name Epiur is not known. There are two theories where Epiur's name came from. One theory is that it may be derived from the Greek word epiouros, which means “guardian”, and that Epiur is a protective spirit. The second theory is that Epiur is the Etruscan name for Euphorion, the son of Achilles and Helen, and a beloved of Zeus, who is also a winged boy.

== Origin ==
The origin of Epiur is a mystery. There have been several attempts to interpret the scenes on the mirrors. One such theory is that Epiur may be the foster child of Menrva and Hercle. They are both tasked with the protection of children. Hercle is tasked with the delivery of Epiur to where he needs to be. At the presentation of Epiur, Hercle may not be presenting the child to Tinia, but receiving the child. He then brings the child to Menrva to be raised. In the scene where Epiur is a young man, Hercle comes to take the child back to society.

== Mirror Scenes ==
Epiur is depicted on at least two mirrors with an inscribed name above him, although he may be represented on other mirror that the babies’ names were not inscribed or have broken off.

=== Presentation of Epiur and Elinai Enthroned ===
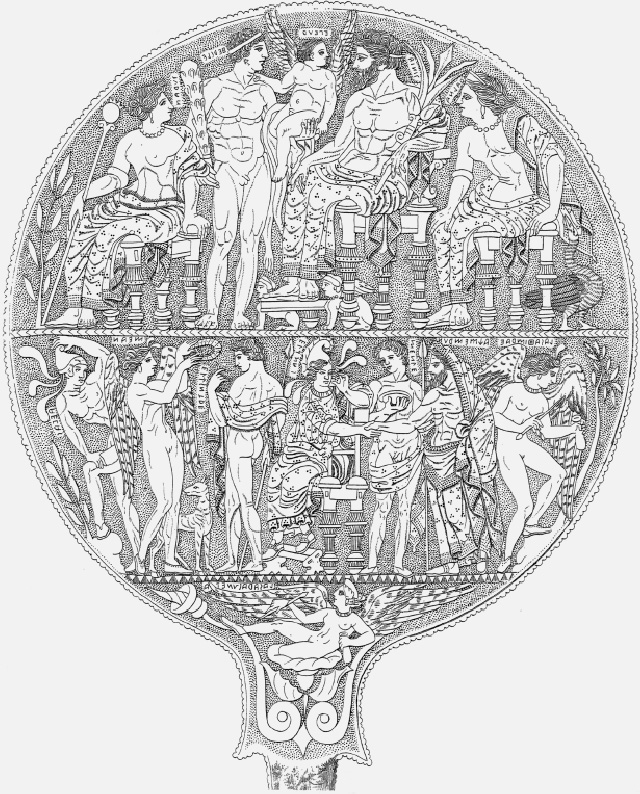
Bronze mirror from Vulci. Paris, Bibliothèque Nationale. 325 BCE. Presentation of Epiur and Eliani enthroned.

The Vulci Bronze Mirror has two registers, divine figures in the top register and Earthly figures on the bottom, a reare feature of the bronze mirrors. This is also one of the largest bronze mirrors that have been found. The scene with the divine figures is the Presentation of Epiur to Tinia. Thalna is on the far left of the scene facing the right to watch the presentation. She is semi-nude, with her breasts exposed, holding a scepter, that may be in the shape of a pomegranate. Hercle is standing next to Thalna holding his club in one hand and Epiur in the other. He is nude with a diadem in his hair. Epiur is sitting in Hercle's arm as he is held out toward a seated Tinia. Epiur is depicted as an infant with the face of an older, balding man. He is also depicted nude, with wings. Tinia is seated on his throne, holding a thunderbolt in the crook of his arm. He is semi-nude with his chiton draped around his waist. Turan is seated on the far right of the scene. She is also semi-nude with her breasts exposed. She and Thalna are adorned with necklaces and earrings. A goose is next to Turan. The figures names are inscribed above their heads on the mirror.

The lower scene depicts Elinai sitting on a throne shaking the hand of Achmenrun with Menle holding a plate in between them. Elchsntre, Elinai's lover, is being crowned by the winged Mean with Aevas watching the scene.

=== Presentation of Winged Baby Boy to Menrva ===
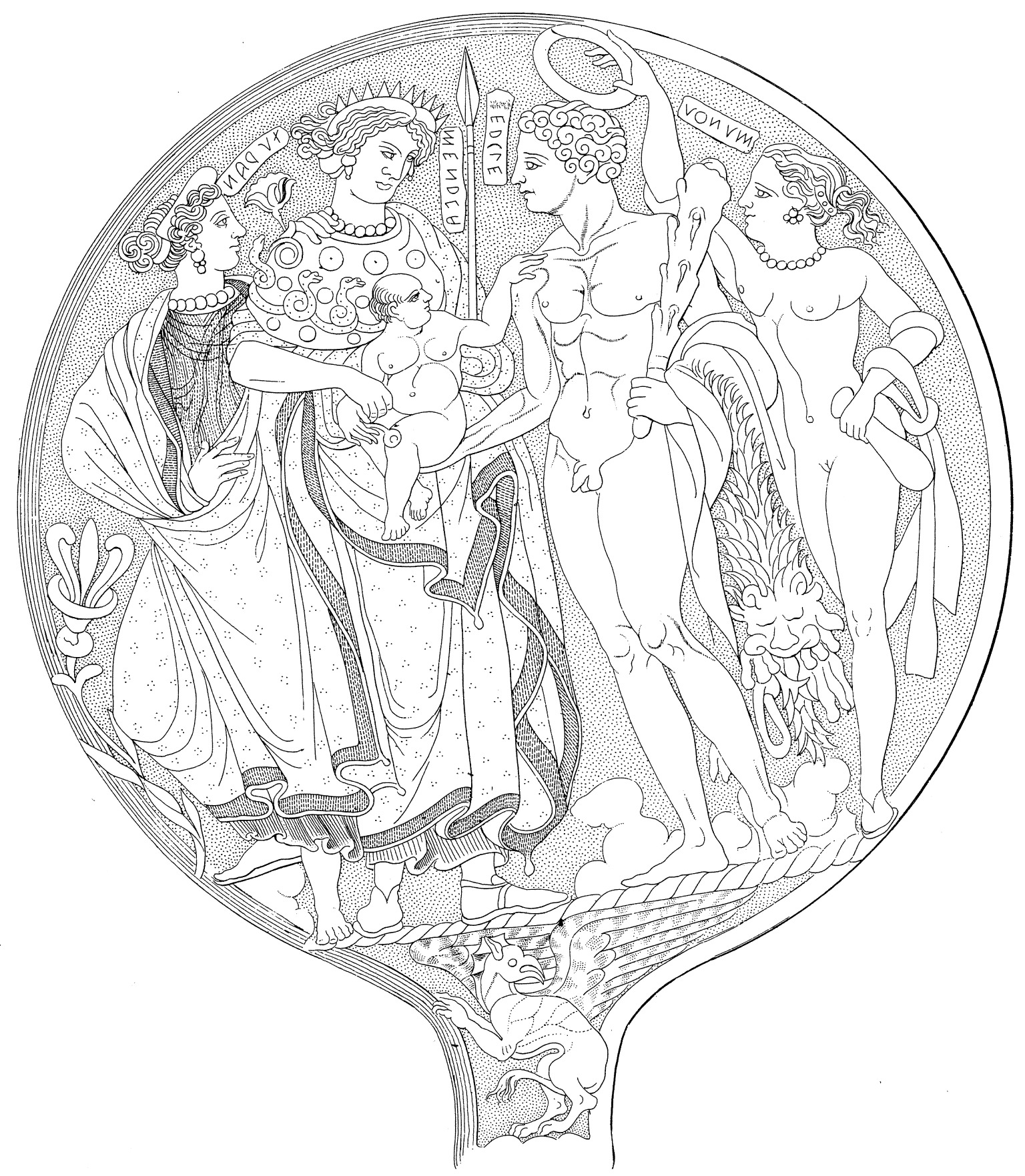
Etruscan Bronze mirror. Berlin, Staatliche Museen. Ca. 350 BCE.

The Bronze Mirror that is housed in Berlin shows a scene similar to that of the Vulci Mirror; Hercle is presenting a baby boy, who is not winged, to a deity, Menrva. Turan is standing behind Menrva, with a hand placed on her shoulder. Menrva is dressed luxuriously and she is receiving the baby boy. The baby is an infant with the face of an older man. He is turned toward Hercle with a hand on his shoulder. Hercle is nude, holding the baby out in one hand and holding his club in the other, with his lion skin draped over his arm. Munthuch is standing behind Hercle, placing a crown onto Hercle's head. Munthuch is also nude.

=== Other Representations ===
This scene, the crowning motif, is one that is shown on several other mirrors. A mirror fragment in Helgoland, Hercle is presenting a baby to Menrva with Turan, Leinth, and an unnamed figure. The baby is looking at Hercle with a hand on his shoulder as he is crowned. On a mirror from the 4th Century BCE, Hercle is standing with a baby in front a seated Menrva. They are accompanied by Turan, Mean, and a third unnamed figure that are looking at the scene.

Epiur also appears on a mirror where he is depicted differently from the other mirrors, he is depicted as a young man. He is unwinged and being lifted off the ground or being put down onto the ground by Hercle. Hercle is nude and unbearded, while Epiur has a chiton around is waist and over one shoulder. A female figure is standing to the side of them with one of her hand raised. She is holding a spear in the other hand. She wears an aegis and a helmet. The names Epiur and Hercle are inscribed above their respective figures, but the female is not named. She is identified as Menrva.

== Gallery ==
Images	Etruscan Bronze mirror from Vulci. Berlin, Staatliche Museen, Antikensammlung. 425-400 BCE. Shows Hercle picking up a young adult Epiur with Menrva looking on.	Etruscan Bronze Mirror. 300 BCE. Crowning of Hercle by Mean, with Menrva and winged baby.	Etruscan Bronze Mirror Fragment. 300 BCE. Presentation of winged baby boy to Menrva.	Etrscan Bronze mirror from Vulci. Paris, Bibliothèque Nationale. 325 BCE. Presentation of Epiur and Eliani enthroned.	Etruscan Bronze mirror. Berlin, Staatliche Museen. Ca. 350 BCE.
Museum	Staatiche Museen, Berlin, Germany	Georg-August-University of Goettingen Archaeological Institute, Göttingen, Germany	Museum für Kunst und Gewerbe Hamburg, Hamburg, Germany	Bibliothèque Nationale, Paris, France	Staatiche Museen, Berlin, Germany
Inscriptions	epiur hercle	N/A	N/A	θalna tinia epiur hercle turan ... lasa himrae aχmemrun menle elχsntre elinai mean aevas lasa racuneta	menrva turan [e]piur hercle mean
Translation	Epiur and Hercle			Thalna, Tinia, Epiur, Hercle, and Turan Lasa Himrae, Agammemnon, Menelaus, Alexander, Elinai, Mean, and Ajax Lasa Racuneta	Menrva, Turan, Epiur, Hercle, and Mean
