= Minerva =

Roman goddess of wisdom

- Goddess of warfare, poetry, medicine, commerce, weaving, the crafts, knowledge, and wisdom
- Member of the Capitoline Triad and the Dii Consentes
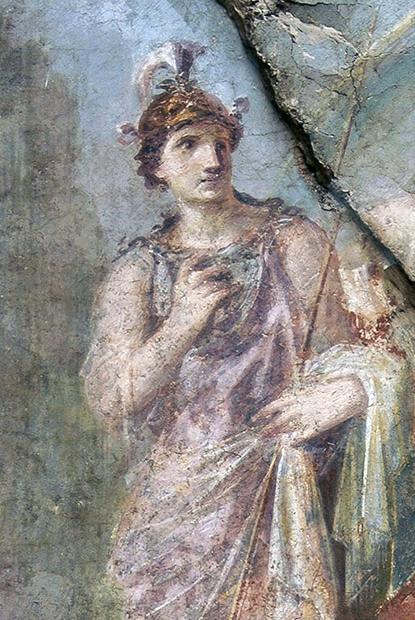
- Fresco of Minerva from Herculaneum (1st century AD)
- Symbols: Owl of Minerva, olive tree, serpent of Jupiter, the Parthenon, the spear, the spindle, and Hellebore
- Gender: Female
- Festivals: Quinquatria
- Parents: Jupiter Metis

Equivalents
- Etruscan: Menrva
- Greek: Athena

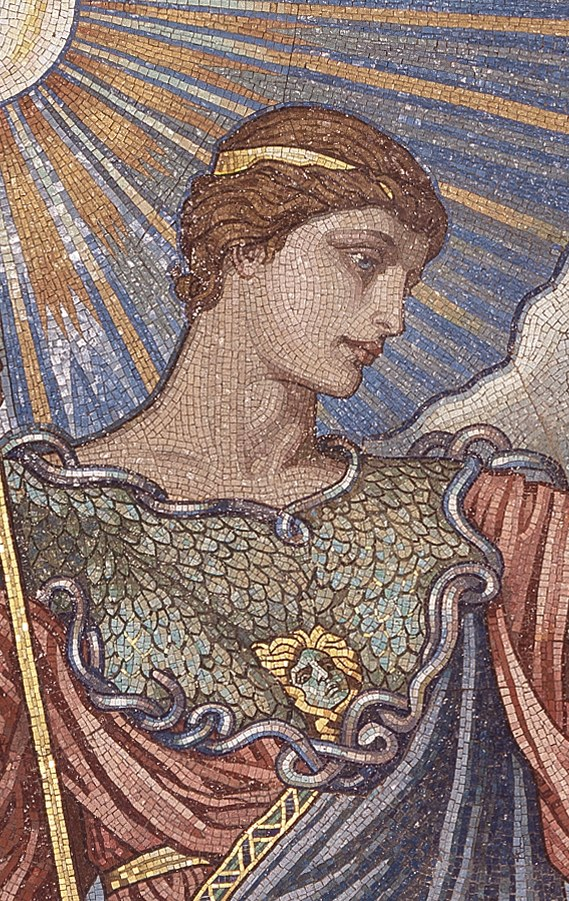
Mosaic of the Minerva of Peace in the Library of Congress

Minerva (/mɪˈnɜːrvə/; Latin: [mɪˈnɛru̯ä]; Etruscan: Menrva) is the Roman goddess of wisdom, justice, law, victory, and the sponsor of arts, trade, and strategy. She is also a goddess of warfare, though with a focus on strategic warfare, rather than the violence of gods such as Mars. Beginning in the second century BC, the Romans equated her with the Greek goddess Athena. Minerva is one of the three Roman deities in the Capitoline Triad, along with Jupiter and Juno.

Minerva is a virgin goddess. Her domain includes medicine, wisdom, commerce, weaving, and the crafts. Minerva is often depicted with her sacred creature, an owl usually named the "owl of Minerva", which symbolised her association with wisdom and knowledge, as well as, less frequently, the snake and the olive tree. Minerva is commonly depicted as tall with an athletic and muscular build. She is often wearing armour and carrying a spear. As an important Roman goddess, she is highly revered, honored, and respected. Marcus Terentius Varro considered her to be ideal and the plan for the universe personified.

== Etymology ==
The name Minerva possibly derives from Proto-Italic *menezwo-, and perhaps ultimately from Proto-Indo-European (PIE) *ménos ("thought"). Helmut Rix (1981) and Gerhard Meiser (1998) have proposed the PIE derivative *menes-weh₂ ("provided with a mind, intelligent") as the transitional form. However, the linguist Benjamin W. Fortson IV criticizes the connection with the root *men- ("to think"), arguing that the connections between Minerva and wisdom emerged at a later date under the influence of Athena. Another hypothesis, advanced by the linguist Ranko Matasović, connects the term with a possible Proto-Indo-European term *méh₁nos- ("moon"). Alternatively, the name of the goddess may not derive from Indo-European—it may be a borrowing from Etruscan.

== Origin ==
According to the Encyclopedia of Indo-European Culture, Minerva constitutes a type of "transfunctional goddess", a mythic archetype common throughout Indo-European cultures in which a goddess simultaneously is associated with warfare, a priesthood, and agricultural activity. The religious role of Minerva can be compared to deities such as Iranian Anahaita or Irish Macha, though these goddesses cannot be derived from a singular divinity in the original Proto-Indo-European religion. According to the archaeologist Miriam Dexter, in Indo-European mythologies, war goddesses such as Minerva generally do not take active roles as fighters. Dexter argues that Minerva, though associated with military functions, operates more as a general.

Through her role in the Capitoline Triad, Minerva may distantly reflect the proposed construct of Proto-Indo-European trifunctionality. However, according to the trifunctional theory, it is likely that Minerva supplanted a preexisting deity, perhaps Quirinus, within a hypothetical Archaic triad. The place of Minerva within the Capitoline Triad may also be attested for Faliscan religion, as one inscription from Faliscan emigrants in Sardinia dated to the 2nd-century BCE mentions the deities [di]ouei, iunonei, and mineruai. Minerva may have acquired her role in the Capitoline triad under Etruscan influence, as a similar set of Etruscan deities consisting of Tinia, Uni, and Menrva is known to have existed. Minerva has been interpreted as a borrowing from Menrva, though it is also possible that the Etruscan deity was a borrowing from Minerva. The Roman 1st-century BCE Varro author attributes Sabine origins to the goddess, writing "Feronia, Minerva, and the Novensides are from the Sabines."

The name Minerva may also have been uncovered in an Oscan inscription which may contain the term menere(vas). However, the philologist Carl Darling Buck argues that the rhotacism indicates that the word, and possibly the cult of the goddess itself, was borrowed from another Italic dialect—perhaps Latin. Similarly, the name minerua has also been uncovered on a Paelignian inscription, though Buck likewise argues that this term was borrowed from another Italic language. In contrast, the linguist Michiel de Vaan notes that the rhotacism could reflect a Proto-Italic sound shift of *-sw- to *-rw-, which may also be attested in terms such as acervus. Nevertheless, the purported existence of this sound change in Proto-Italic remains controversial.

Archaeological excavations at a sanctuary in Lavinium revealed terracotta statues depicting Minerva dating to the 4th-century BCE, indicating the existence of a contemporary cult of the goddess. Other terracotta statuettes from the site varyingly portray unveiled girls with short hair and veiled women with expensive adornments, which likely represent unmarried and married women respectively. Though these votives appear to be natively Italic, some of the veiled women are depicted with accompanying doves, a design element perhaps attributable to the influence of Greek Aphrodite. Additional finds from the sanctuary include figurines of swaddled infants and votive depictions of breasts and wombs, all of which reinforce the prominence of childbirth at the site. According to the archaeologist Fritz Graf, the evidence from this sanctuary indicates that Minerva operated as a guardian of young women during the transition into marriage and motherhood. The theme of transition was not, however exclusive to women—votive items from Lavinium portray young men adorned with a bulla offering toys.

The connections between Minerva and childbirth at Lavinium could be construed as a distinction between the Roman divinity and the Greek goddess Athena, who was a virgin deity that actively avoided attempts at procreation, such as in the story of the mythical birth of Erichthonius. However, Graf suggests that the childrearing associations may have emerged from the shared characteristic of Athena and Minerva as guardians of young women during transitional phases. In further support of this theory, Graf notes that none of the votives from Lavinium depict conception, arguing that they instead gesture towards potential future childbirth. The role of Minerva as a protector of young women may have also contributed to her association with healing, as attested at the Temple of Minerva Medica on the Esquiline Hill, which contains a deposit of anatomical votives that also dates to the 4th-century BCE. Alternatively, her medicinal connotations may have emerged from her role as a goddess of crafts, or perhaps due to the influence of Athena Hygieia. Though, a Greek origin for this aspect of Minerva is slightly problematic, as the connection between Athena and Hygieia was largely restricted to Athens and the Greek divinity functioned as a protector of preexisting health whereas Minerva served to actively treat illness.

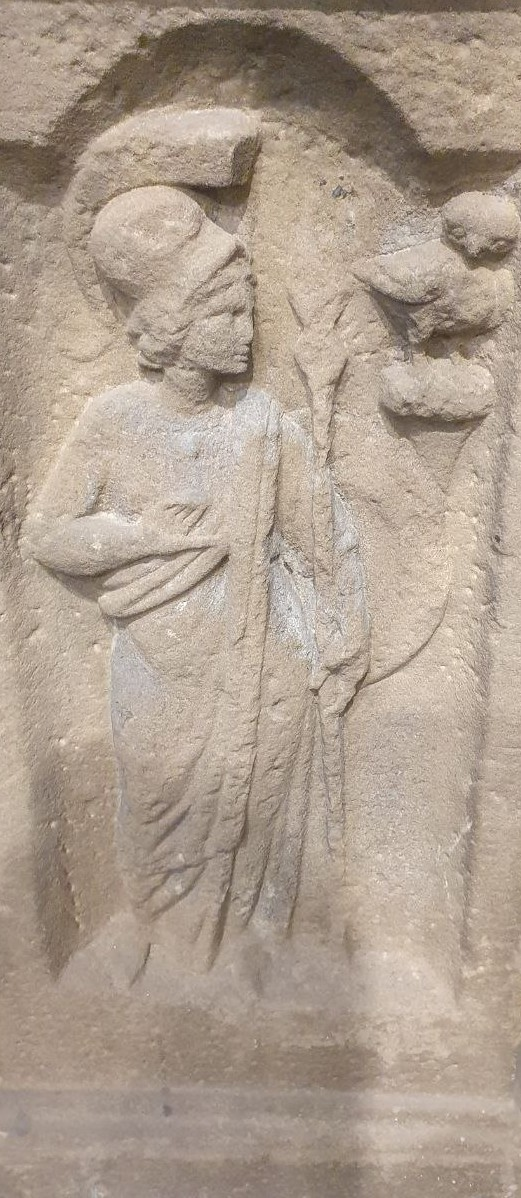
Minerva with an Owl, Mainz

Numerous loom weights have also been discovered at Lavinium, possibly in relation to the traditional association of women in prehistoric Italy with weaving. Alternatively, these items could be related to the function of Athena in her role as Ergane ("ἐργάνη," "worker"), in which she operated as a patroness of artisanship. In particular, the Greek goddess was associated with weaving at practices such as the Arrhephoria—a ritual involving the weaving of the peplos of Athena. However, the Greek ceremonies were largely reserved for a small sample of young girls, whereas the sanctuary at Lavinium was likely open to a broad swathe of the population. Regardless, the connection between Athena and craftsmanship could have spurred the acquisition of similar traits for Minerva, whose sacred festival—the Quinquatria—was itself associated with artisanry. Uniquely, in Rome, at least by the late Roman Republic, the connection with craftsmanship had arisen as one of the primary characteristics of Minerva, perhaps—according to Graf—because her role as a civic goddess was already fulfilled by Jupiter. In contrast, within Greece, Athena was largely defined by her relationship with the polis, whereas her artisanship associations were relatively minor.

It is possible that the association of Minerva with the city center may have been borrowed from Athena in her capacity as Polias (Πολιάς, "of the city"), which referred to her role as a protectress of the city. In Pompeii, a votive deposit uncovered near the Porta Stabia contained an ancient terracotta bust that may depict Minerva. It is possible that this statue was intended to sanctify the fortifications, thereby incurring the added support of the divine to safeguard the city. This particular invocation of Minerva may also reflect the influence of poliad Athena. Livy, a 1st-century BCE Roman historian, describes a lectisternium during which a couch ("pulvīnāria") was on display for Minerva and Neptune. It is likely that the connection between these two deities also stems from Greek influence, as it mirrors the relation between Athena and Poseidon in the founding myth of Athens.

== Presence in mythology ==
Minerva is a prominent figure in Roman mythology. She appears in many famous myths. Many of the stories of her Greek counterpart Athena are attributed to Minerva in Roman mythology, such as that of the naming of Athens resulting from a competition between Minerva and Neptune, in which Minerva created the olive tree.

=== Birth ===
The myth of Minerva's birth follows that of Athena. Jupiter raped the Titaness Metis, which resulted in her attempting to change shape to escape him. Jupiter then recalled the prophecy that his own child would overthrow him, just as he himself had overthrown his father Saturn, and in turn, Saturn had overthrown his father Caelus. Fearing that their child would be male, and would grow stronger than he was and rule the Heavens in his place, Jupiter swallowed Metis whole after tricking her into turning herself into a fly. The Titaness gave birth to Minerva and forged weapons and armour for her child while within Jupiter's body. The constant pounding and ringing left Jupiter with agonizing pain. To relieve the pain, Vulcan used a hammer to split Jupiter's head and, from the cleft, Minerva emerged, as a grown adult and in full battle armour.

=== Minerva and Arachne ===
Arachne was a mortal highly proficient in weaving and embroidery. Not only were her finished works beautiful, but also her process, so much so that nymphs would come out of their natural environments to watch her work. Arachne boasted that her skills could beat those of Minerva, and if she were wrong she would pay the price for it. This angered Minerva, and she took the form of an old woman to approach Arachne, offering her a chance to take back her challenge and ask forgiveness. When Arachne refused, Minerva rid herself of her disguise and took Arachne up on her challenge. Arachne began to weave a tapestry that showed the shortcomings of the gods, while Minerva depicted her competition with Neptune and the gods looking down with disgust on mortals who would dare to challenge them. Minerva's weaving was meant as a final warning to her foe to back down. Minerva was insulted by the scenes that Arachne was weaving, and destroyed it. She then touched Arachne on the forehead, which made her feel shame for what she had done, leading her to hang herself. Minerva then felt bad for the woman, and brought her back to life. However, Minerva transformed her into a spider as punishment for her actions, and hanging from a web would forever be a reminder to Arachne of her actions that offended the gods. This story also acted as a warning to mortals not to challenge the gods.

=== Medusa and her children ===
Medusa was one of the three Gorgons, sisters who could turn to stone any living creature they looked upon. According to Ovid, Neptune raped Medusa in the temple of Minerva. As punishment for the desecration of her temple, Minerva transformed Medusa's hair into snakes.

When Perseus beheaded Medusa some of the blood spilled onto the ground, and from it came Pegasus. Minerva caught the horse and tamed it before gifting the horse to the Muses. It was a kick from the hoof of Pegasus that opened the fountain Hippocrene. When Bellerophon later went to fight the Chimera he sought to use Pegasus in the fight. In order to do this he slept in Minerva's temple, and she came to him with a golden bridle. When Pegasus saw Bellerophon with the bridle the horse immediately allowed Bellerophon to mount, and they defeated the Chimera.

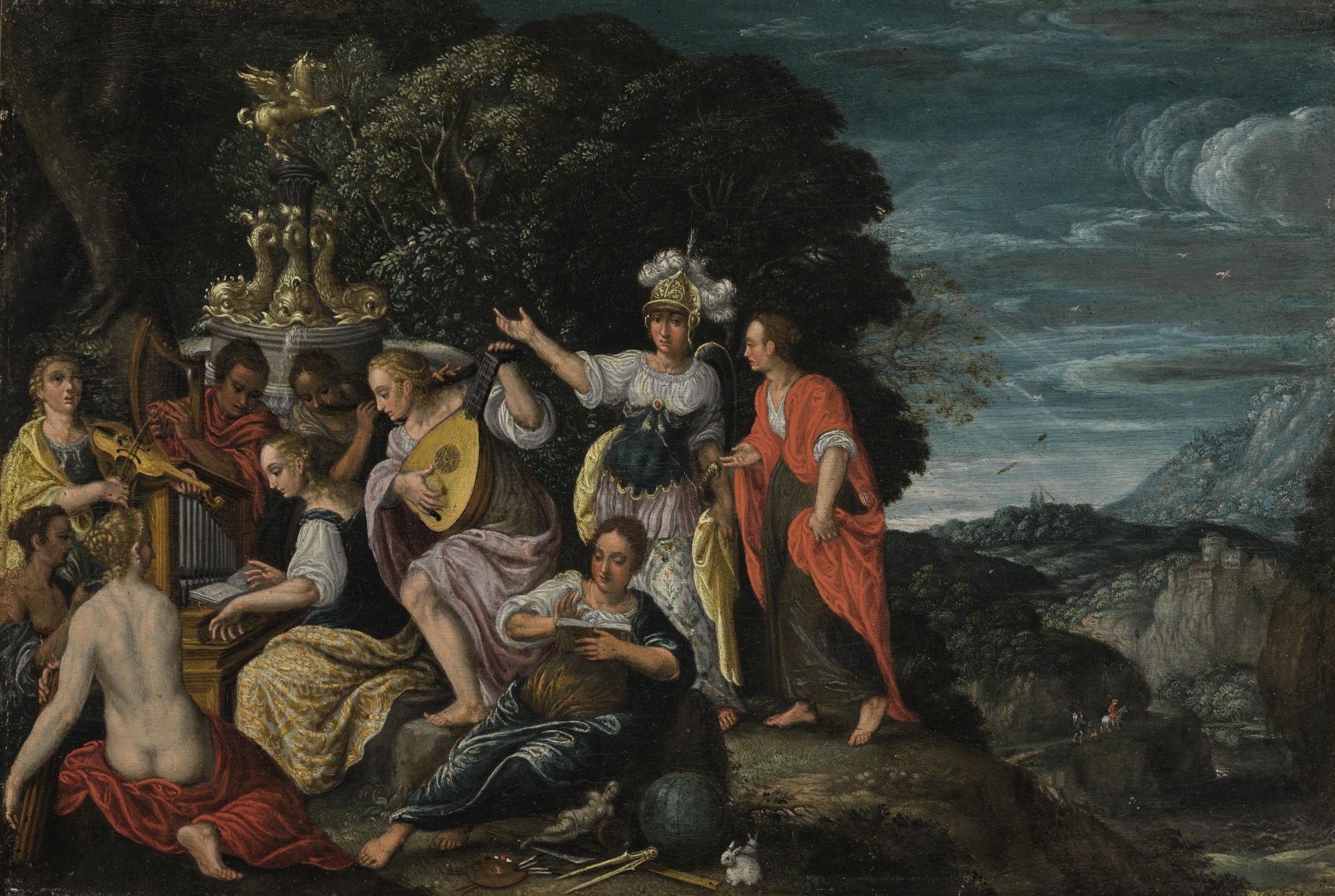
Painting of Minerva visiting the Muses

=== Turning Aglauros to stone ===
The Metamorphoses by Ovid tells the story of Minerva and Aglauros. When Mercury comes to seduce the mortal virgin Herse, her sister Aglauros is driven by her greed to help him. Minerva discovers this and is furious with Aglauros. She seeks the assistance of Envy, who fills Aglauros with so much envy for the good fortune of others that she turns to stone. Mercury fails to seduce Herse.

=== Minerva and Hercules ===
Minerva assisted the hero Hercules. In Hyginus' Fabulae she is said to have helped him kill the Hydra (30.3).

=== Minerva and Ulysses ===
Minerva assisted the hero Ulysses. Hyginus describes in his work Fabulae that Minerva changes Odysseus' appearance in order to protect and assist him multiple times (126).

=== Inventing the flute ===
Minerva is thought to have invented the flute by piercing holes into boxwood. She enjoyed the music, but became embarrassed by how it made her face look when her cheeks puffed out to play. Because of this she threw it away and it landed on a riverbank where it was found by a satyr.

== Worship in Rome and Italy ==
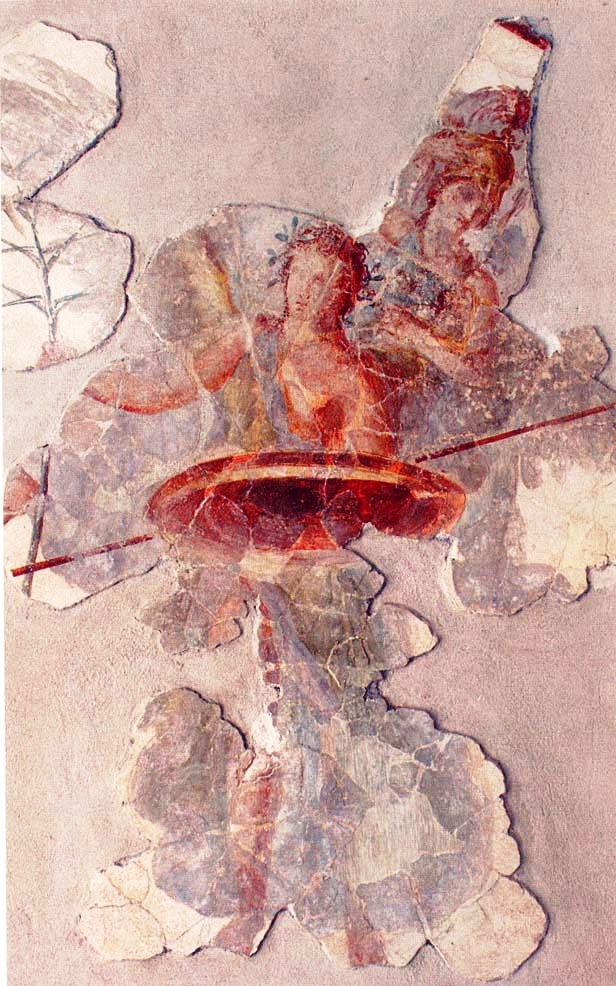
Fresco of Minerva (helmeted figure on right) from the Villa San Marco, Stabiae (1st century AD)

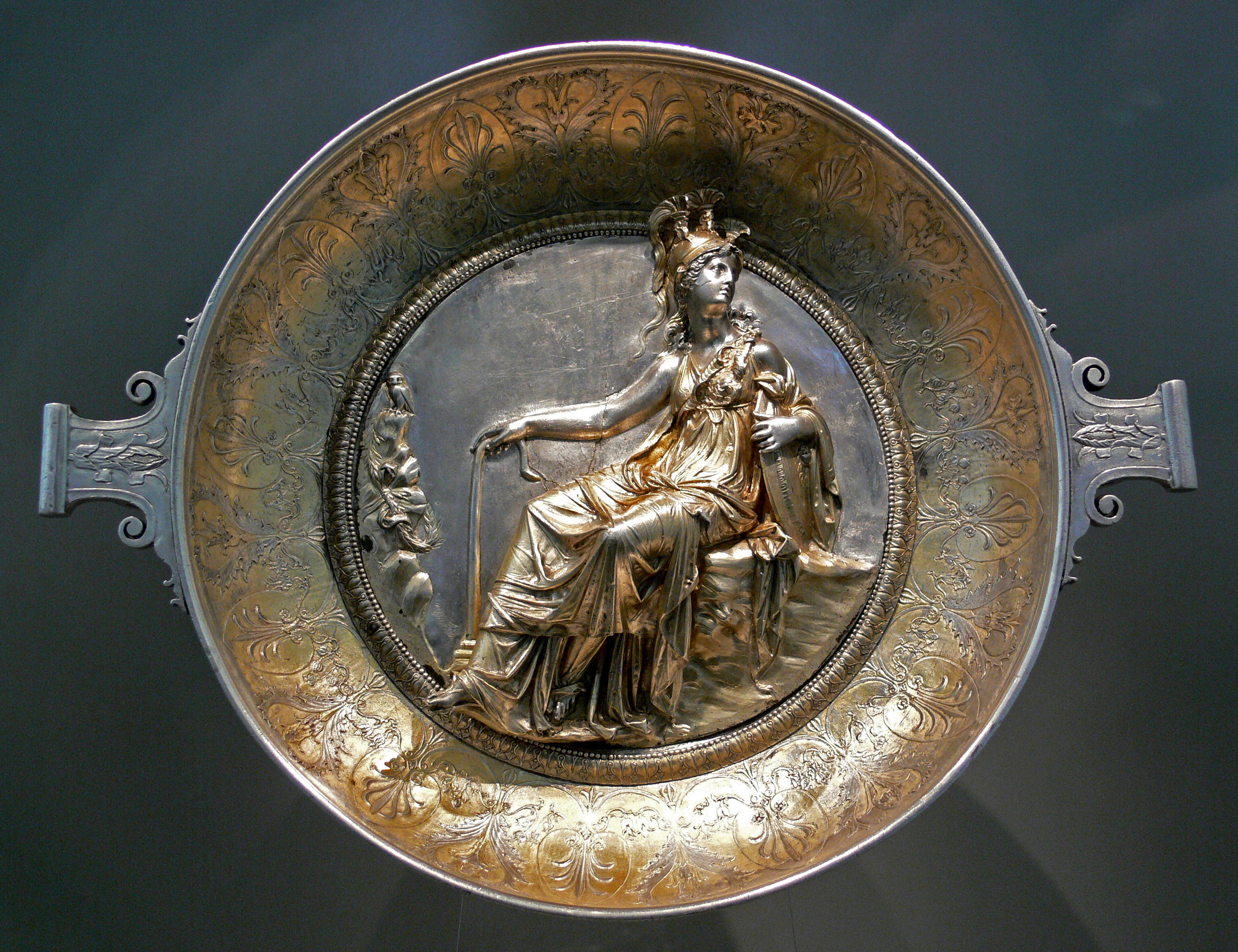
Raised-relief image of Minerva on a Roman gilt silver bowl, first century BC

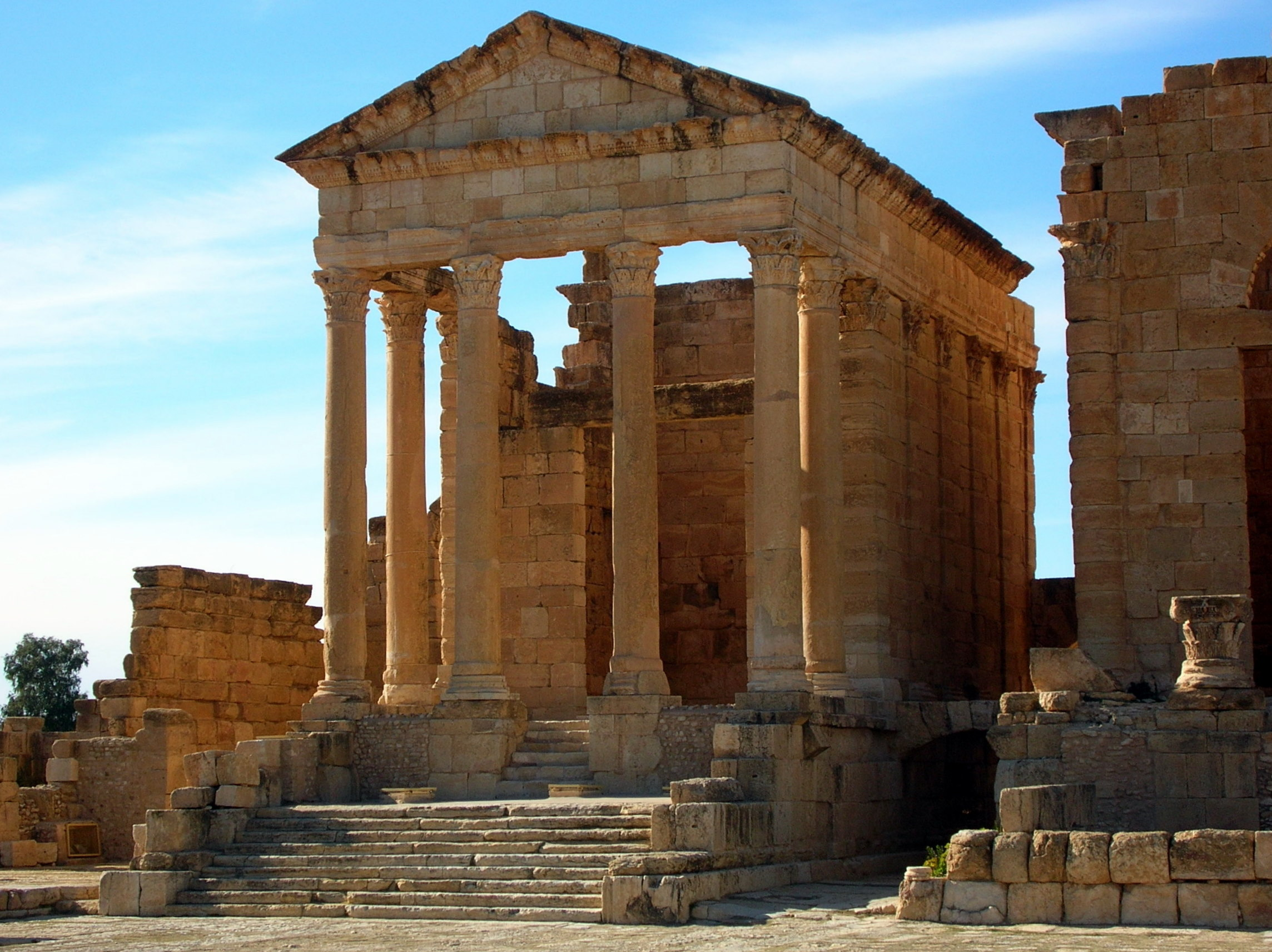
Temple of Minerva in Sbeitla, Tunisia

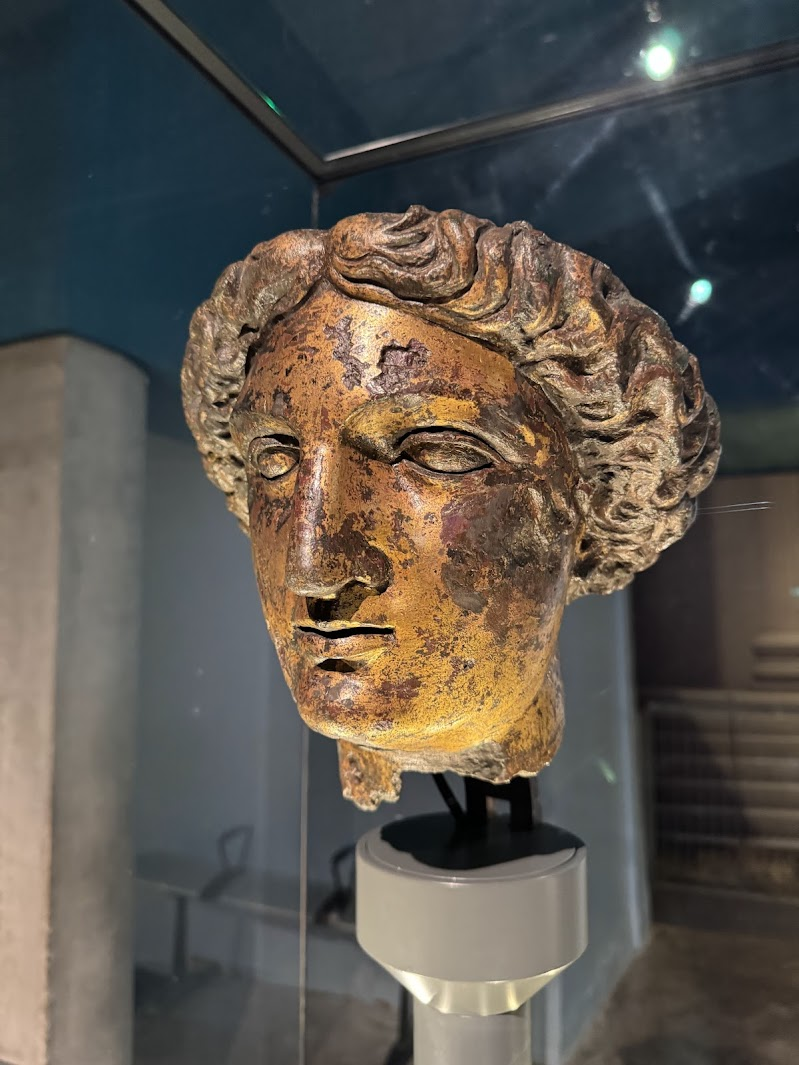
A head of "Sulis-Minerva" found in the ruins of the Roman baths in Bath

Silver denarius of the Roman Emperor Domitian (Domitianus) featuring Minerva, dated c. 90 AD, IMP CAES DOMIT AVG GERM P M TR P VIIII, laureate head right; IMP XXI COS XV CENS P P P, Minerva standing left, holding spear and thunderbolt, shield resting against back of leg; References: BMC 167, RIC 691, RSC 260, Paris 159, Cohen 260

The Romans celebrated her festival from March 19 to March 23 during the day that is called, in the neuter plural, Quinquatria, the fifth day after the Ides of March, the nineteenth, an artisans' holiday. This festival was of deepest importance to artists and craftsmen as she was the patron goddess of crafting and arts. According to Ovid (Fasti 3.809) the festival was 5 days long, and the first day was said to be the anniversary of Minerva's birth, so no blood was to be shed. The following four days were full of games of "drawn swords" in honour of Minerva's military association. Suetonius tells us (Life of Domitian 4.4) that Domitian celebrated the Quinquatria by appointing a college of priests who were to stage plays and animal games in addition to poetry and oratory competitions. A lesser version, the Minusculae Quinquatria, was held on the Ides of June, June 13, by the flute-players, as Minerva was thought to have invented the flute. In 207 BC, a guild of poets and actors was formed to meet and make votive offerings at the temple of Minerva on the Aventine Hill: among others, its members included Livius Andronicus, who produced a translation of Homer's Odyssey into Latin. The Aventine sanctuary of Minerva continued to be an important center of the arts for much of the middle Roman Republic.

As Minerva Medica, she was the goddess of medicine and physicians. As Minerva Achaea, she was worshipped at Lucera in Apulia where votive gifts and arms said to be those of Diomedes were preserved in her temple.

According to the Acta Arvalia, a cow was sacrificed to Minerva on 13 October 58 AD along with many other sacrifices to celebrate the anniversary of Nero coming to power. On 3 January 81 AD, as a part of the New Year vows, two cows were sacrificed to Minerva (among many others) to secure the well-being of the emperor Titus, Domitian Caesar, Julia Augusta, and their children. On 3 January 87 AD there is again record of a cow being sacrificed to Minerva among the many sacrifices made as a part of the New Year vows.

In Fasti III, Ovid called her the "goddess of a thousand works" due to all of the things she was associated with. Minerva was worshipped throughout Italy, and when she eventually became equated with the Greek goddess Athena, she also became a goddess of battle. Unlike Mars, god of war, she was sometimes portrayed with sword lowered, in sympathy for the recent dead, rather than raised in triumph and battle lust. In Rome her bellicose nature was emphasized less than elsewhere.

According to Livy's History of Rome (7.3), the annual nail marking the year, a process where the praetor maximus drove a nail in to formally keep track of the current year, happened in the temple of Minerva because she was thought to have invented numbers.

There is archaeological evidence to suggest that Minerva was worshipped not only in a formal civic fashion, but also by individuals on a more personal level.

=== Roman coinage ===
Minerva is featured on the coinage of different Roman emperors. She often is represented on the reverse side of a coin holding an owl and a spear among her attributes.

== Worship in Roman Britain ==
During the Roman occupation of Britain, it was common for carpenters to own tools ornamented with images of Minerva to invoke a greater amount of protection from the goddess of crafts. Some women would also have images of her on accessories such as hairpins or jewellery. She was even featured on some funerary art on coffins and signet rings.

=== Bath ===
During Roman rule, Minerva became equated with the Celtic goddess Sulis, to the degree where their names were used both together and interchangeably. She was believed to preside over the healing hot springs located in Bath. Though Minerva is not a water deity, her association with intellectual professions as Minerva Medica she could also be thought of as a healing goddess, the epigraphic evidence present makes it clear that this is how Minerva was thought of in Bath.

Some of the archaeological evidence present in Bath leads scholars to believe that it was thought Minerva could provide full healing from things such as rheumatism via the hot springs if she was given full credit for the healing.

The temple of Sulis Minerva was known for having a miraculous altar-fire that burned coal as opposed to the traditional wood.

=== Carrawburgh ===
There is evidence of worship of Minerva Medica in Carrawburgh due to archaeological evidence such as a relief depicting her and Aesculapius.

=== Chester ===
There is a shrine dedicated to Minerva in Edgar's Field built in the face of a quarry next to the River Dee.

== Etruscan Menrva ==
Stemming from an Italic goddess *Meneswā, the Etruscans adopted the inherited Old Latin name, *Menerwā, thereby calling her Menrva. It is presumed that her Roman name, Minerva, is based on this Etruscan mythology. Minerva was the goddess of wisdom, war, art, schools, justice and commerce. She was the Etruscan counterpart to Greek Athena. Like Athena, Minerva burst from the head of her father, Jupiter (Greek Zeus), who had devoured her mother (Metis) in an unsuccessful attempt to prevent her birth.

By a process of folk etymology, the Romans could have linked her foreign name to the root men- in Latin words such as mens meaning "mind", perhaps because one of her aspects as goddess pertained to the intellectual. The word mens is built from the Proto-Indo-European root *men- 'mind' (linked with memory as in Greek Mnemosyne (μνημοσύνη, mnēmosúnē) and mnêstis (μνῆστις): memory, remembrance, recollection, manush in Sanskrit meaning mind).

The Etruscan Menrva was part of a holy triad with Tinia and Uni, equivalent to the Roman Capitoline Triad of Jupiter-Juno-Minerva.
