= Tinia (moon) =

Moon of 55637 Uni

- Timelapse animation of Tinia (yellow arrow) orbiting back and forth around Uni, as seen by the Hubble Space Telescope from 2005 to 2006

Discovery
- Discovered by: Brown et al.
- Discovery date: August 2005

Designations
- Designation: (55637) Uni I
- Pronunciation: /ˈtɪniə/
- Named after: Tinia

Orbital characteristics
- Semi-major axis: 4750±40 km 4770±40 km
- Eccentricity: 0.17±0.03
- Orbital period (sidereal): 8.3095 d (prograde); 8.3094±0.0002 d
- Inclination: 63.1° 275.5±0.3°
- Satellite of: 55637 Uni

Physical characteristics
- Mean diameter: 180.8±0.6 km (preferred) (Note: minimum size assuming a spherical satellite); 193.0±1.0 km
- Albedo: 0.139±0.023; 0.122±0.02
- Absolute magnitude (H): 6.476±0.183

Tinia is the only known moon of the trans-Neptunian object 55637 Uni. Tinia was discovered in August 2005, by observations with the Hubble Space Telescope, and announced on 22 February 2007.

In 2026, a 2 chord stellar occultation was done and estimated Tinia's diameter at approximately 180.8 (Note: Under the assumption of equal albedos and a spherical shape) (Note: The 180.8±0.6 km estimate is the minimum size for a spherical moon that the study obtained, which is the study's preferred estimate.) to 193.0 km. It orbits Uni every 8.3 days at an average distance of 4800 km. Tinia was named together with Uni on 1 September 2025 after Tinia, the Etruscan sky god and husband of the Etruscan goddess of love and fertility Uni.

== History ==
=== Discovery ===
Uni has one known moon, which is named Tinia. Tinia was discovered in August 2005, by observations with the Hubble Space Telescope, and announced on 22 February 2007.

=== Naming ===
Tinia was named together with Uni on 1 September 2025 after Tinia, the Etruscan sky god and husband of the Etruscan goddess of love and fertility Uni. Tinia (also Tin, Tinh, Tins or Tina) was the sky god and the highest deity in Etruscan religion, equivalent to the Roman Jupiter and the Greek Zeus.

== Occultations ==
A 2 chord stellar occultation in 2026 was done.

== Orbital characteristics ==
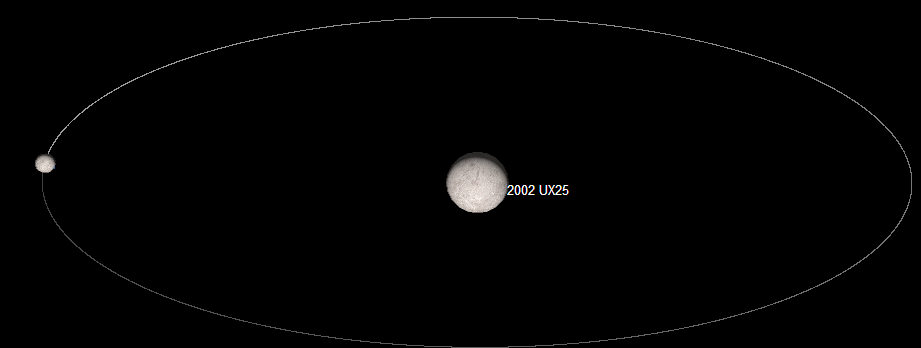
A simulated circular orbit of Tinia at a distance of 4,770 km from Uni.

Tinia completes one complete orbit around Uni every 8.3094±0.0002 days, with an orbital eccentricity of 0.17±0.03, indicating a total system mass of (1.25±0.03)×10^{20} kg. Its orbital eccentricity is 0.17±0.03. It orbits Uni at a distance of 4770 km.

== Physical characteristics ==
History of size estimates for Tinia
Year	Tinia diameter (km)	Method	References
2013	210±30	Thermal (NEATM)	Fornasier u. a.
2013	~190	Assuming same albedos	Brown
2014	193±10	Thermal (NEATM)	Vilenius u. a.
2017	230±19	Thermal (ALMA)	Brown u. a.
2026	180.8±0.6 km 193.0±1.0 km	Stellar occultation	Rommel

Tinia was discovered at 0.16 arcseconds from Uni with a difference in absolute magnitude of 2.5. 2 chord stellar occultation in 2026 derived an absolute magnitude of 6.476±0.183 for Tinia, Its diameter is estimated at 180.8±0.6 km, or 193.0±1.0 km. The 180.8±0.6 km estimate is the minimum size for a spherical moon that the study obtained, which is the study's preferred estimate.

== See also ==
- Minor-planet moon#Trans-Neptunian objects
- Trans-Neptunian object
