= Capitoline Triad =

Jupiter, Juno, and Minerva

The Capitoline Triad was a group of three deities who were worshipped in ancient Roman religion in an elaborate temple on Rome's Capitoline Hill (Latin Capitolium). It comprised Jupiter, Juno and Minerva. The triad held a central place in the public religion of Rome.

== The Triad ==
The three deities who are most commonly referred to as the "Capitoline Triad" are Jupiter, the king of the gods; Juno (in her aspect as Iuno Regina, "Queen Juno"), his wife and sister; and Jupiter's daughter Minerva, the goddess of wisdom. This grouping of a male god and two goddesses was highly unusual in ancient Indo-European religions, and is possibly derived from the Etruscan trio of Tinia, the supreme deity, Uni, his wife, and Menrva, their daughter and the goddess of wisdom.

In some interpretations, this group replaced an original Archaic Triad made up of Jupiter, the farming/war god Mars and war/farming god Quirinus.

=== The Capitolia ===
Jupiter, Juno and Minerva were honored in temples known as Capitolia, which were built on hills and other prominent areas in many cities in Italy and the provinces, particularly during the Augustan and Julio-Claudian periods. Most had a triple cella. The earliest known example of a Capitolium outside Italy was at Emporion (now Empúries, Spain). According to Ovid, Terminus also had a place there, since he had a shrine there before it was built and, as the god of boundary stones, refused to yield.

Although the word Capitolium (pl. Capitolia) could be used to refer to any temple dedicated to the Capitoline Triad, it referred especially to the temple on the Capitoline Hill in Rome known as aedes Iovis Optimi Maximi Capitolini ("Temple of Jupiter Best and Greatest on the Capitoline"). The temple was believed to have been built under the reign of Lucius Tarquinius Superbus, the last King of Rome prior to the establishment of the Roman Republic. Although the temple was shared by Jupiter, Juno and Minerva, each deity had a separate cella, with Juno Regina on the left, Minerva on the right, and Jupiter Optimus Maximus in the middle. It included a podium and a tetrastyle (four-columned) pronaos (porch). The Temple of Jupiter Optimus Maximus's sculpture of the Triad is lost, although a small-scale late Antonine reproduction was discovered by looter Pietro Casasanta in 1992. This Triad, pictured below, is the only example of a fully preserved marble triad.

Another shrine (sacellum) dedicated to Jupiter, Juno Regina and Minerva was the Capitolium Vetus on the Quirinal Hill. It was thought to be older than the more famous temple of Jupiter Optimus Maximus on the Capitoline Hill, and was still a landmark in Martial's time, in the late 1st century.

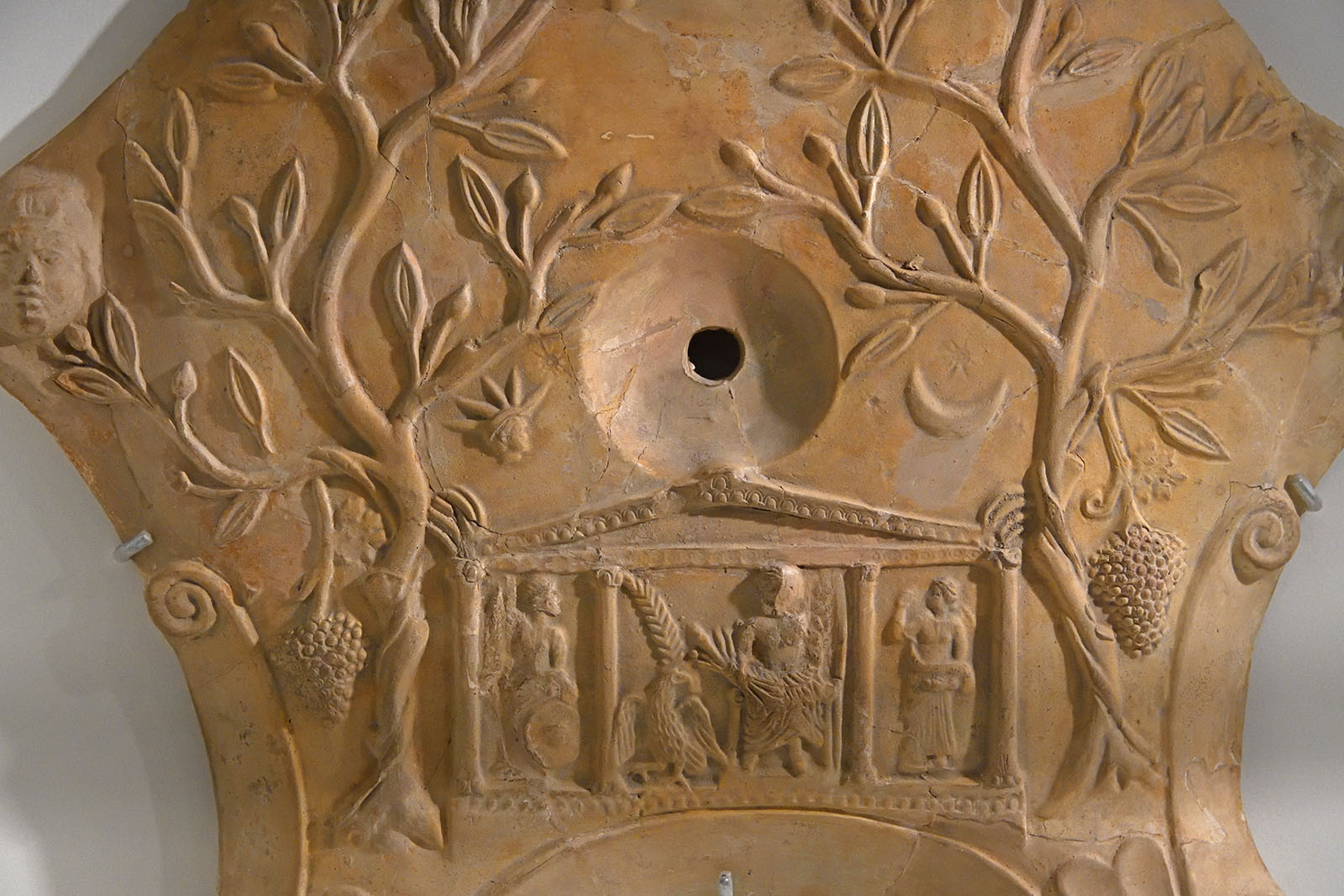
Detail of an oil lamp with the triad, 75–100 AD (Allard Pierson Museum)

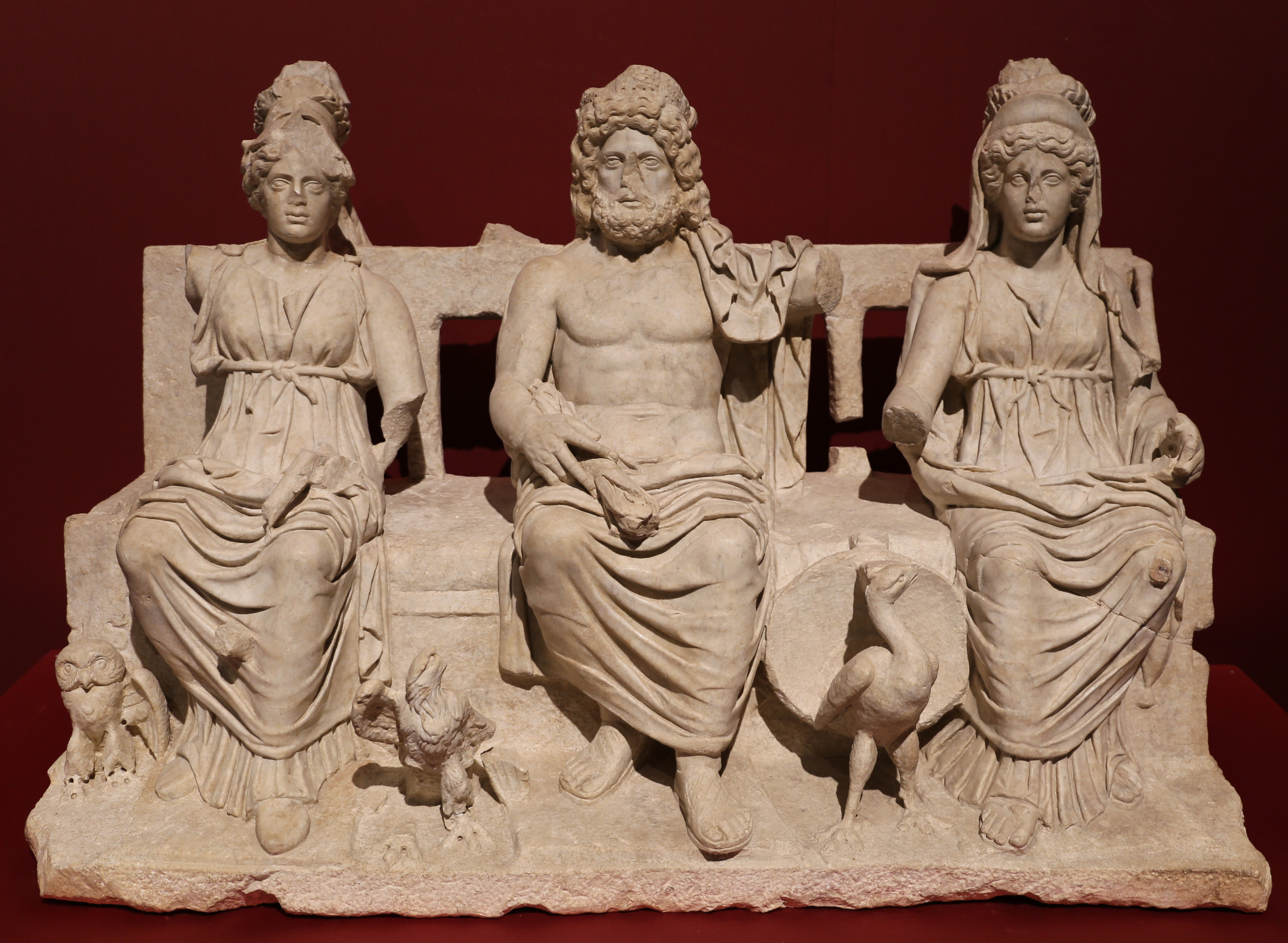
Capitoline Triad of Guidonia, 160–180 AD (Archaeological Museum of Guidonia)

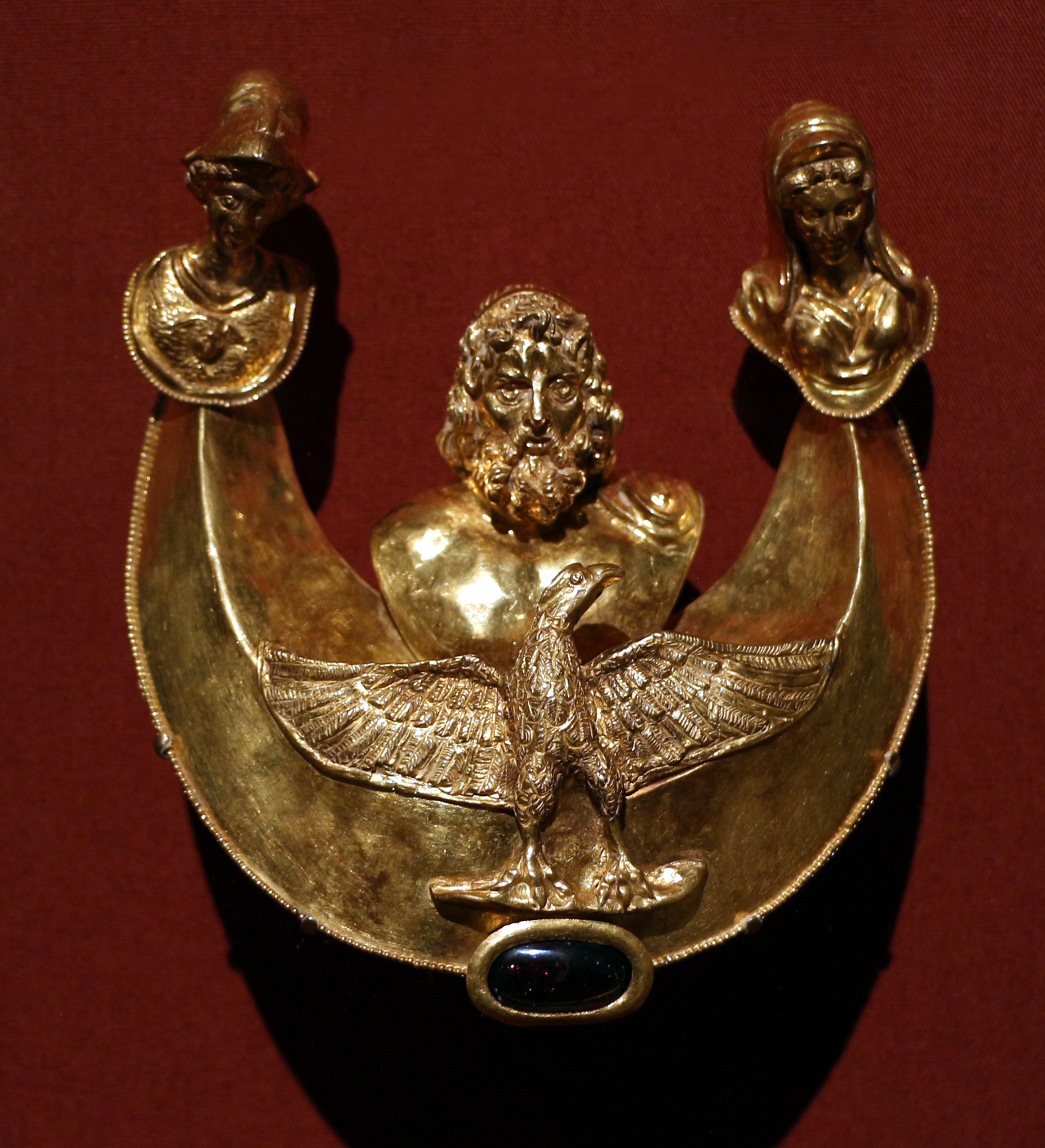
On a gold pectoral, 200–300 AD (Cleveland Museum of Art)

== See also ==
- Church of the Holy Sepulchre § Connection to Roman temple
