= Leinth =

Etruscan mythical character

Leinth is an Etruscan deity. Within Etruscan iconography, it is difficult to distinguish mortals from divine figures without inscriptions. Inscriptions to the god Leinth have only been identified on two bronze mirrors and a single fragment of ceramic, found within an artisan's zone on an Etruscan site in Italy. It is difficult, with such little evidence, to determine what may seem to be even the most rudimentary qualities of the deity, because the Etruscans did not consistently assign specific genders or attributes to their gods. Leinth appears both as a male and a female on two different bronze mirrors, and aside from the inscription, there seem to be no distinguishing traits to connect the figures.

== Mirror #1, Perugia ==
Hercle, Mean, and Leinth. Engraved Bronze Etruscan Mirror.

On the bronze mirror from Perugia, Leinth is presented as a heavily clothed woman. A young Hercle, distinguished by his club and lion-skin cape, stands over a defeated Cerberus, the three-headed beast attributed to the underworld. Mean, the Etruscan goddess of victory, crowns Hercle with a wreath, perhaps in respect to his success of his labor. Leinth stands to the right of this victorious scene, both looking and pointing away from the center towards some unknown. The name Leinth has been associated with the Etruscan word to die, “lein”. Following this connection, it makes sense for a deity, likely linked to death, to be present in a scene that appears to take place in the underworld, as suggested by the presence of Cerberus. While we may establish the connection between the setting of this mirror's scene with the etymology of Leinth's name, we cannot conjecture what Leinth's role within the scene may be. She appears to be distracted by something just out of view, and whatever she is witnessing must be important enough for her to gesture towards the mystery. Beyond this interpretation, we must be reminded that this mirror could very well represent an Etruscan myth that has been lost to us.

== Mirror #2, Chiusi ==
Leinth, Turan, Menrva, Unidentified Male. Engraved Bronze Etruscan Mirror. Berlin, Antikensammlung. Early third century BCE.

Another bronze mirror depicts the divine Leinth, though this time he is indicated as a male. The mirror presents a scene involving multiple divinities. Leinth appears as a nude male, leaning on a spear and holding a baby. Turan, the goddess of love, stands to his left, draped in cloth and jewelry as she observes the goddess Menrva handling another baby. Menrva wears a crested helmet and jewelry, although unlike Turan, Menrva has an exposed breast. This is indicative that the goddess may intend to nurse the infant. It is unclear whether she is actively dipping the child into an amphora or simply pulling the child out from it, however both postulations seem to suggest a ritualistic event that concerns the protection of young children. Leinth and the unnamed opposite nude male both lean on spears and look onto the scene, in poses that suggest they serve a protective function. Leinth engages in the activity, holding a child on his left leg while the infant clings to his outstretched right arm. Once again, the narrative that may have accompanied this scene is lost to modern-day scholars, but there is room for inference. Notably, the goddess Recial appears in the lower exergue of the mirror. Recial, or Rescial, is identified as the goddess of rejuvenation. Her name may be drawn from the Etruscan word “sval”, to live. The presence of such a dichotomy, a god linked with death and a goddess connected to new life, presents an interesting dynamic within the context of the scene. One suggested explanation volunteers that the infants may be representative of newborn spirits that are being inducted into the protection of Menrva, who was the guardian of Etruscan children.

== Inscription ==
The final evidence of the enigmatic Leinth figure comes in the form of yet another inscription, though this time on a fragment of ceramic. Within the sanctuary of the artisans at the Etruscan site of Cetamura del Chianti, a single sherd of black-gloss was discovered bearing the inscription “milein”. This was read as “mi Lein”, which would translate to “I [am of] Lein...”. This is the first dedicatory inscription to have been reported on and attributed to the divine Leinth, but its location within the artisans’ zone may help classify the deity as a figure of success and fortune. The artisans would present offerings to the gods in hopes of success in their work. For example, a potter may devote an offering to the gods prior to firing a large batch of ceramics, with the intentions that a specific god or goddess would see the dedication and be pleased enough to grant the potter success in his handicraft.
