= Capitolium Vetus =

Temple in ancient Rome

- Shown in ancient Rome
- Click on the map for a fullscreen view
- 41°54′08″N 12°29′26″E

The Capitolium Vetus (Latin for "old Capitol" or "ancient Capitol") was an archaic temple in ancient Rome, dedicated to the Capitoline Triad. Vetus distinguishes it from the main temple to the Triad on the Capitol and shows that it was the older of the two and possibly the oldest temple in Rome dedicated to them. It was on a site in what is now the Trevi district, to the north of the Quirinal and to the north-west of the Ministry of Defence. Its dedicatory inscriptions were found near the ministry.

== See also ==
- List of Ancient Roman temples

== Bibliography ==
- Samuel Ball Platner and Thomas Ashby, A topographical dictionary of Ancient Rome, Oxford University Press, 1929
