= Euphorion (mythology) =

Figure of Greek mythology; son of Achilles

In Greek mythology, Euphorion (Ancient Greek: Εὐφορίων "the abundant") was the son of Achilles and Helen of Troy.

== Mythology ==
Euphorion was born when his parents had already been dwelling in the Land of the Blessed, and was named "after the fertility of the land". He was a supernatural being and he had a pair of wings.

Euphorion, a hubristic youth, attempted to fly to heaven but Zeus caught him and with a blow knocked him down. According to another version, Zeus fell in love with him, but he did not reciprocate his love. Euphorion escaped from Zeus, but the god caught him on the island of Milos and hit him with lightning, killing him. He also forbade his burial, but the island nymphs did bury him and were changed into frogs for having disobeyed Zeus.

Euphorion also appeared as a character in Goethe's Faust Part 2. In this book, he is son of Faust and Helen of Troy.

== Sources ==
- Bartelink, Dr. G.J.M. (1988). Prisma van de mythologie. Utrecht: Het Spectrum
- Pierre Grimal The Dictionary of Classical Mythology, s.v. "Euphorion"
- Grimal, Pierre, The Dictionary of Classical Mythology, Wiley-Blackwell, 1996. ISBN 978-0-631-20102-1
- Ptolemy Hephaestion, New History, 4 in Photius, 190
