= Menrva =

Etruscan goddess of war, art, wisdom, and medicine

- Goddess of war, art, wisdom, and health
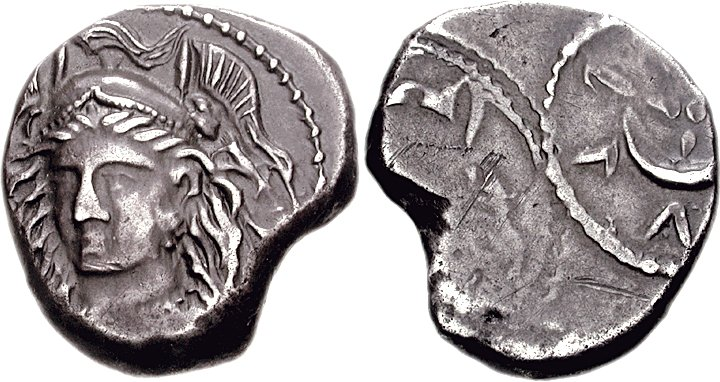
- Menrva on a Roman As from Etruria

Genealogy
- Parents: Uni and Tinia
- Consort: Hercle
- Children: Epiur

Equivalents
- Greek: Athena
- Roman: Minerva

Menrva (also spelled Menerva or Menfra) was an Etruscan goddess of war, art, wisdom, and medicine. She contributed much of her character to the Roman Minerva and, like her, was eventually seen as a counterpart of the Greek Athena. She was the child of Uni and Tinia.

== Origin ==
Menrva's name is indigenous to Italy and might even be of Etruscan origin, stemming from an Italic moon goddess, *Meneswā, "she who measures." It is thought that the Etruscans adopted the inherited Old Latin name, *Menerwā, thereby calling her Menrva. However, this has been disputed. Carl Becker suggests that her name appears to contain the PIE root *men-, which he notes was linked in Greek primarily to memory words (cf. Greek "mnestis"/μνῆστις 'memory, remembrance, recollection'), but which more generally referred to 'mind' in most Indo-European languages.

Although Menrva was seen by Hellenized Etruscans as their counterpart to Athena Menrva has some unique traits that make it clear that she was not an import from Greece. Etruscan artists under the influence of Greek culture, however, liked to portray Menrva with Gorgoneion, helmet, spear, and shield.

== Worship ==
Menrva was part of a triple deity with Uni and Tinia, later reflected in the Roman Capitoline Triad of Jupiter, Juno, and Minerva.

She was a god of wisdom and warfare, but also a powerful weather deity, often depicted wielding a thunderbolt and with wings to take to the air. She was a goddess of health, and her sanctuaries show votive offerings of terracotta sculptures in the shape of parts of the body, indicating that her followers believed she could heal. Surviving appeals from her worshippers speak to her large domain, as these include requests to the goddess for healing, the protection of children, the military defense of their communities, and the legitimacy of their rulership.

Menrva's temples and altars were equipped for libations. Some were recessed into the ground, suggesting Menrva had a chthonic aspect. Ragna Enking notes that Menrva likely descended from a Minoan mother goddess, and retained more of these traits into the classical era than her counterparts Athena and Minerva did.

== Mythology ==
Etruscan art shows Menrva in much of the same adventures as her Greek counterpart, such as being born by bursting from her father's head already fully armed and armored, protecting and aiding heroes such as Hercle (Heracles) and Pherse (Perseus), backing the Achaeans in the Trojan War, confronting the dragon (alongside Jason) guarding the Golden Fleece, considering granting immortality to Tydeus before being disgusted by his cannibalism, and partaking in the Judgement of Paris (known to the Etruscans as Elcsntre). Another equivalent myth captured in art is Menrva participating as a combatant in the Gigantomachy, with dead Giants shown at her feet while she raises a spear. On a bronze mirror found at Praeneste, she attends Perseus, who consults two Graeae, and, on another, holds high the head of Medusa, while she and seated Perseus and Hermes all gaze safely at its reflection in a pool at their feet. These images are more likely to reflect literary sources than any cult practice. On a bronze mirror from Bolsena, c. 300 BCE, she is portrayed attending a scene of Prometheus Unbound with Esplace (Asclepius), who bandages Prometheus' chest.

Often, Menrva is depicted in a more essentially Etruscan style, as a lightning thrower. Martianus mentions her as one of nine Etruscan lightning deities. Etruscan style works often depict Menrva with a thunderbolt; the thunderbolt imagery seems to be unique to Etruscan Menrva images. The Greeks never attributed an association with weather to Athena, making this another important difference between the two religious cults that demonstrates their separate characteristics. Minerva was sometimes depicted as a lightning thrower, and it is believed that this aspect of her character originated from Menrva. While she participates in equivalent stories to her Greek myths, some artistic motifs in them are also unique to Etruscan art. For example, a 4th-century BC bronze mirror depicting her slaying the Giant Akrathe (itself a name unknown in Greece) has her attacking the Giant with the arm she has torn from his body. This imagery is attested to only in Etruria and recurs on vase paintings, bronze plaques, scarabs, and mirrors.

While most Greek and Roman traditions claimed Athena/Minerva as an unmarried and childless maiden, these are not universal, and these traditions did not seem to apply to Menrva. Nancy Thomson de Grummond stated that "there is good evidence that she was involved in romance... even more surprising is that her consort may be none other than the great hero/god Hercle." One bronze mirror from c. 325 BC (Morlanwelz, CSE Belgique:1.25a) shows the two as an intimate pair, with a nude Hercle embracing Menrva, who is clothed (including her distinctive helmet and aegis) and leaning into him. Another mirror from c. 300 BC (Berlin, Staatliche Museen, Antikensammilung) shows Menrva ardently embraced by a naked youth with a bow underfoot, probably also representing Hercle. A bronze mirror from Vulci, c. 425–400 BCE (Berlin, Staatliche Museen, Antikensammlung) also shows a nude beardless Hercle, picking up Epiur, here depicted as a young adult; Menrva, present next to Hercle, raises her right hand in a gesture of farewell or affection. Several other mirrors show Menrva and Hercle mutually holding a baby (sometimes identified as Epiur), causing some historians to theorize that they were Epiur's parents or foster parents.

A pediment relief from c. 200 BC depicts the two in an embrace and is described by Neda Leipen as follows: "In Greek mythology, Herakles is typically shown with Athena; but here, the scene is given an Etruscan touch by having Hercle put his arm around Menrva’s shoulder as a gesture of friendship or love. The scene may represent the union of Hercle and Menrva in an Etruscan story unknown today." Another mirror depicts Menrva with her right arm wrapped around Hercle, who is holding a baby. The Lexicon Iconographicum Mythologiae Classicae describes the scene as follows: "Bronze mirror fr. Heligoland, Kropatschek ColI. – Hornbostel, o. c. 56, 97 no. 118. – C. 300 B. C. – H. [Hercle] and Menerva in center of ensemble with child. H. (nude, lionskin over l. arm) holds child in l. as on 153. Menerva embraces H. with her r. Inscribed, fragmentary: – Leinth (far r.), Turon (r., background), Men[rva]; male figure to l. of H. is too incomplete to identify; in background, temple architecture; below: Catmithe (~Ganymedes/Catmite) with eagle; above: satyr?".

Gustav Hermansen concurs with the characterization of Menrva and Hercles as lovers and cites as additional proof mirrors showing the two of them with the children identified as Maris: "Is Maris a son of Turan? That Maris may be a son of Hercle is very probable, and in that case Menerva seems to be the mother... [the] young children whom he holds in his hands, and who mostly are in the centre of the picture, reveal his paternity by all usual conventions and "Maris Hercle’s," apparently an outright statement of a father-son relationship, has been mentioned above... Menerva is present in some of the pictures, and the children are sometimes handled by him, sometimes by her; it all creates a parental atmosphere, a father and a mother, shown in a conventional way." Jean Bayet also finds that some examples of the couple seen in Etruscan art indicate a romantic relationship, such as depictions of Menrva offering Hercle a flower.
