= Hercle =

Ancient Etruscan god

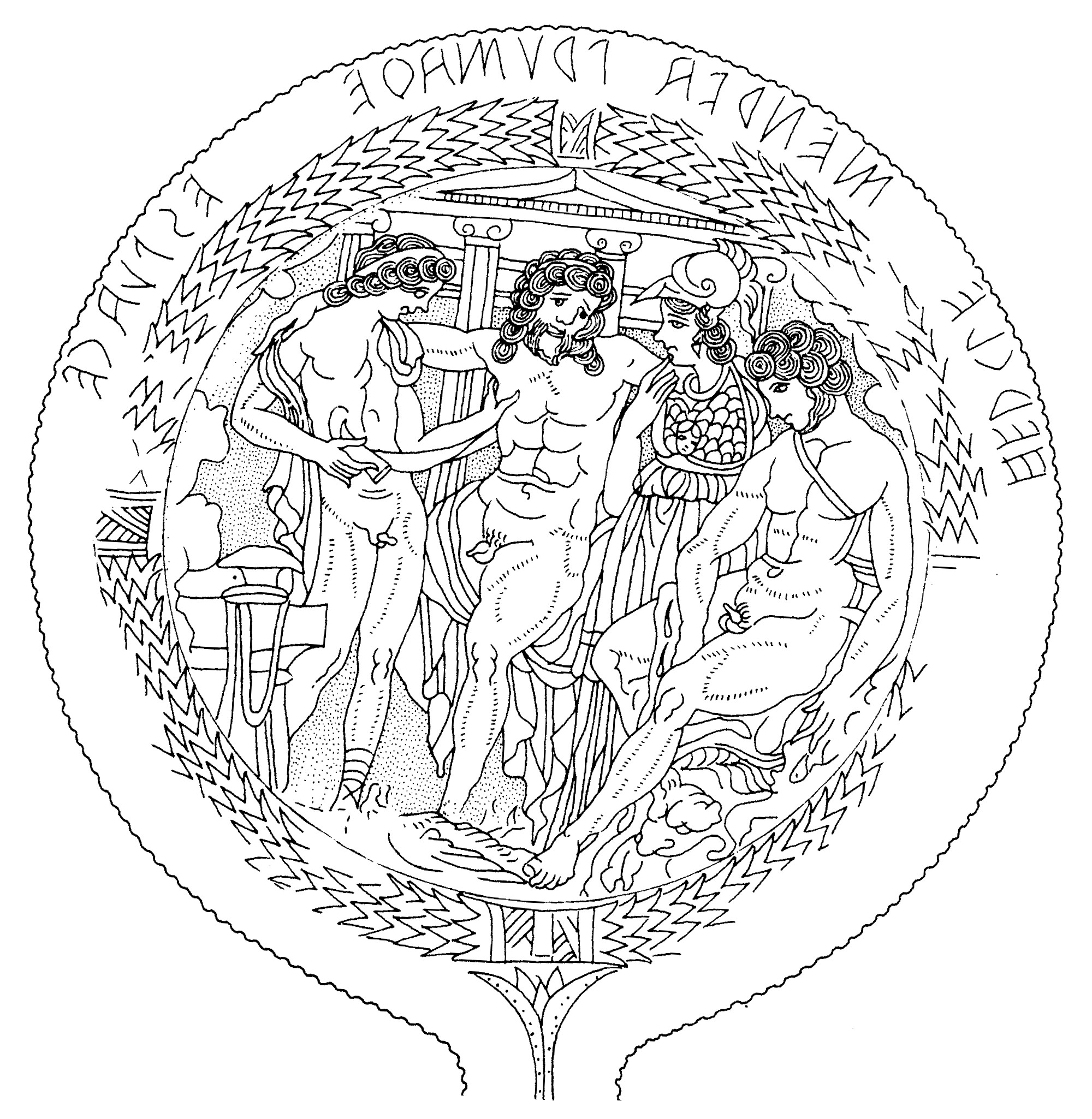
- Drawing of a scene on an Etruscan mirror in which Hercle is depicted alongside (from left to right) Esplace, Prumathe, and Menrva.

Genealogy
- Parents: Tinia and a mortal woman (raised and adopted by Uni)
- Siblings: Menrva (half-sister)
- Consort: Menrva
- Children: Epiur

Equivalents
- Canaanite: Melqart
- Greek: Heracles
- Roman: Hercules
- Egyptian: Heryshaf
- Germanic: Hercules Magusanus

In Etruscan religion, Hercle (also Heracle or Hercl), the son of Tinia and Uni, was a version of the Greek Heracles, depicted as a muscular figure often carrying a club and wearing a lionskin. He is a popular subject in Etruscan art, particularly bronze mirrors, which show him engaged in adventures not known from the Greek myths of Heracles or the Roman and later classical myths of Hercules.

In the Etruscan tradition, Uni (Roman Juno) grants Hercle access to a life among the immortals by offering her breast milk to him. Hercle was the first man elevated to a godhood through his deeds and Etruscan aristocrats tried to identify with this ascension, as reflected in artwork and literature.

Hercle differed in many aspects from the Greek Heracles. He seems to have enjoyed a special status in Italy in general. In art, he is shown to be a defender of an unknown goddess against creatures on the other side of a human border, showing his status as a Liminal deity. In Etruria, he was also associated with running water. He was also the master of animals, the protector of flocks and herds, and of herdsmen.

== Worship ==
Hercle was more of an oracular god in Etruria than in Greece. Several inscriptions have come to light from 1970 that show evidence of cult worship. Particularly, a sanctuary at Caere preserved many inscriptions of dedications to the god. In Toledo, a bronze weight and an attic red-figured cup created by Euphronios testify an important cult to Hercle.

== Scenes from Etruscan art ==
Hercle can be recognized in Etruscan art from his attributes, or is sometimes identified by name. Since Etruscan literature has not survived, the meaning of the scenes in which he appears must be interpreted by comparison to Greek and Roman myths, through information about Etruscan myths preserved by Greek and Latin literature, or through conjectural reconstructions based on other Etruscan representations.

=== Union of Hercle and Menrva ===
In multiple scenes from Etruscan art, there is a close relation between Hercle and Menrva, such as on one such bronze mirror from the late 4th century BCE. Hercle and Menrva are depicted at the center of the scene in an intimate manner, with Hercle in the nude leaning on his club closer to Menrva. While the story is unknown, this mirror, in addition to others, may suggest a union between the two gods, a divergence from the virgin nature of Athena who was seen as the Greek equivalent of Menrva.

=== Hercle and Epiur ===
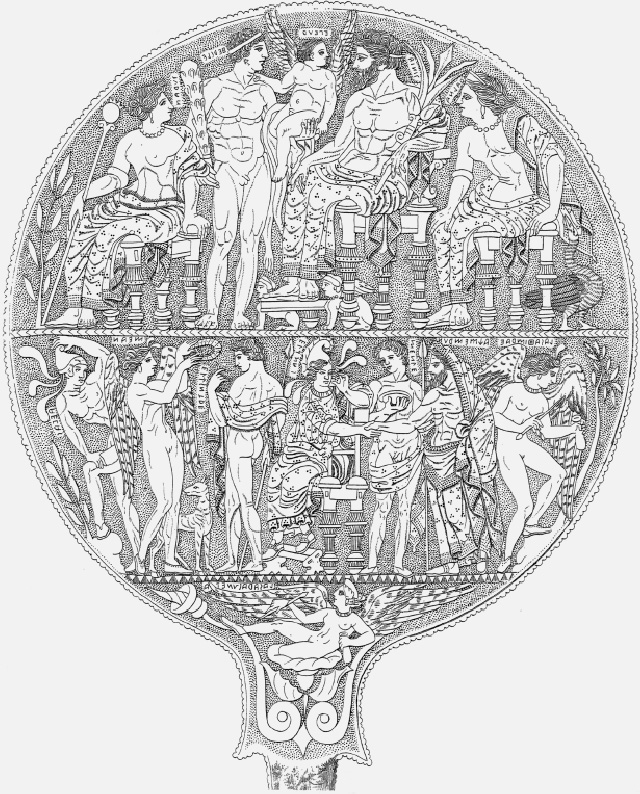
Etruscan Bronze Mirror found in Vulci. 325 BCE. depicted from left to right, Turan, Hercle, Epiur (labelled Epeur), Tinia, and Thalna.

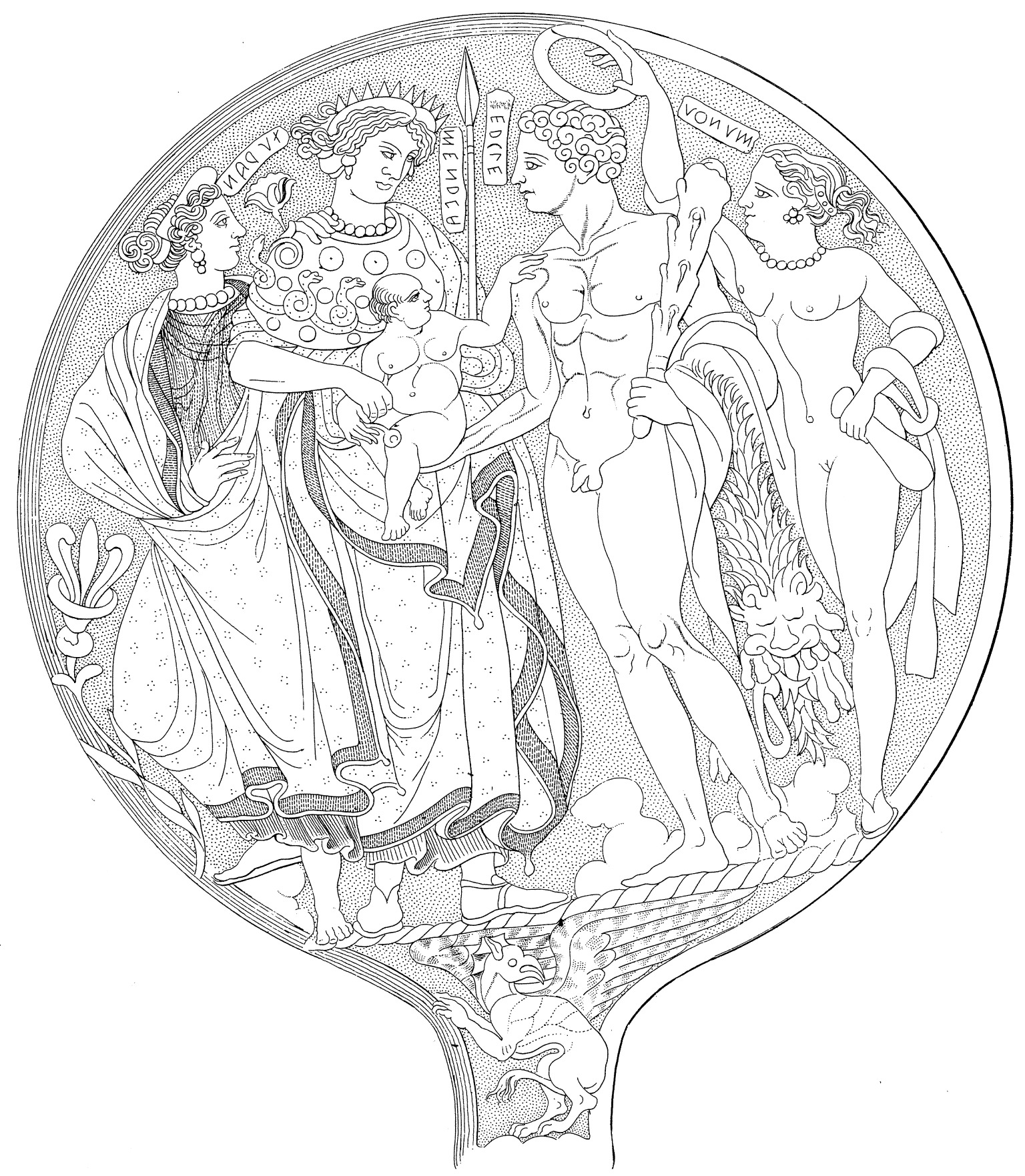
Etruscan Bronze Mirror 350 BCE. depicted from left to right, Turan, Menrva, Hercle, Unnamed Child, and Munthuch.

Hercle is depicted on several mirrors from the mid-to-late 4th century BCE in relation to a child labeled Epiur. In one mirror, Hercle is presented as presenting the young divinity to Tinia, perhaps suggesting a fatherlike or guardianship role between the two.

A second mirror depicts Hercle holding an unnamed child while Menrva holds the child's arms. Some scholars believe this to be another depiction of the gods Hercle and Menrva holding the young god Epiur. This may be further evidence of the relationship between the two gods and their roles as foster parents to Epiur.

=== Adoption of Hercle by Uni ===
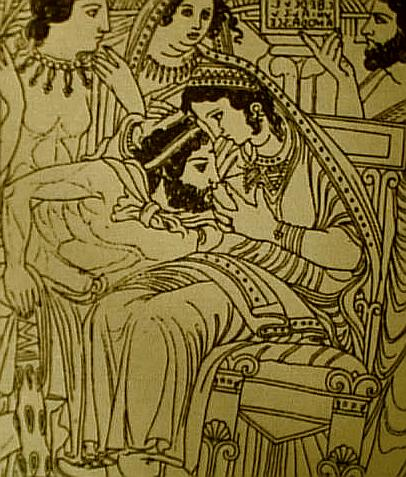
Etruscan Bronze Mirror found in Volterra, 325 BCE. Hercle feeds from the goddess Uni's Breast.

There are many examples of mirrors depicting Hercle during the ritual of his adoption into the family of Tinia and Uni, the patroness of marriage in the Etruscan pantheon. In this mirror from Volterra, Hercle suckles on Uni's breast likely as a symbolic acceptance into the royal family of the gods.

== See also ==
- List of Etruscan mythological figures
