= Uni (mythology) =

Etruscan goddess

- Goddess of love, marriage, fertility, family, and women
- Member of the Etruscan Triad
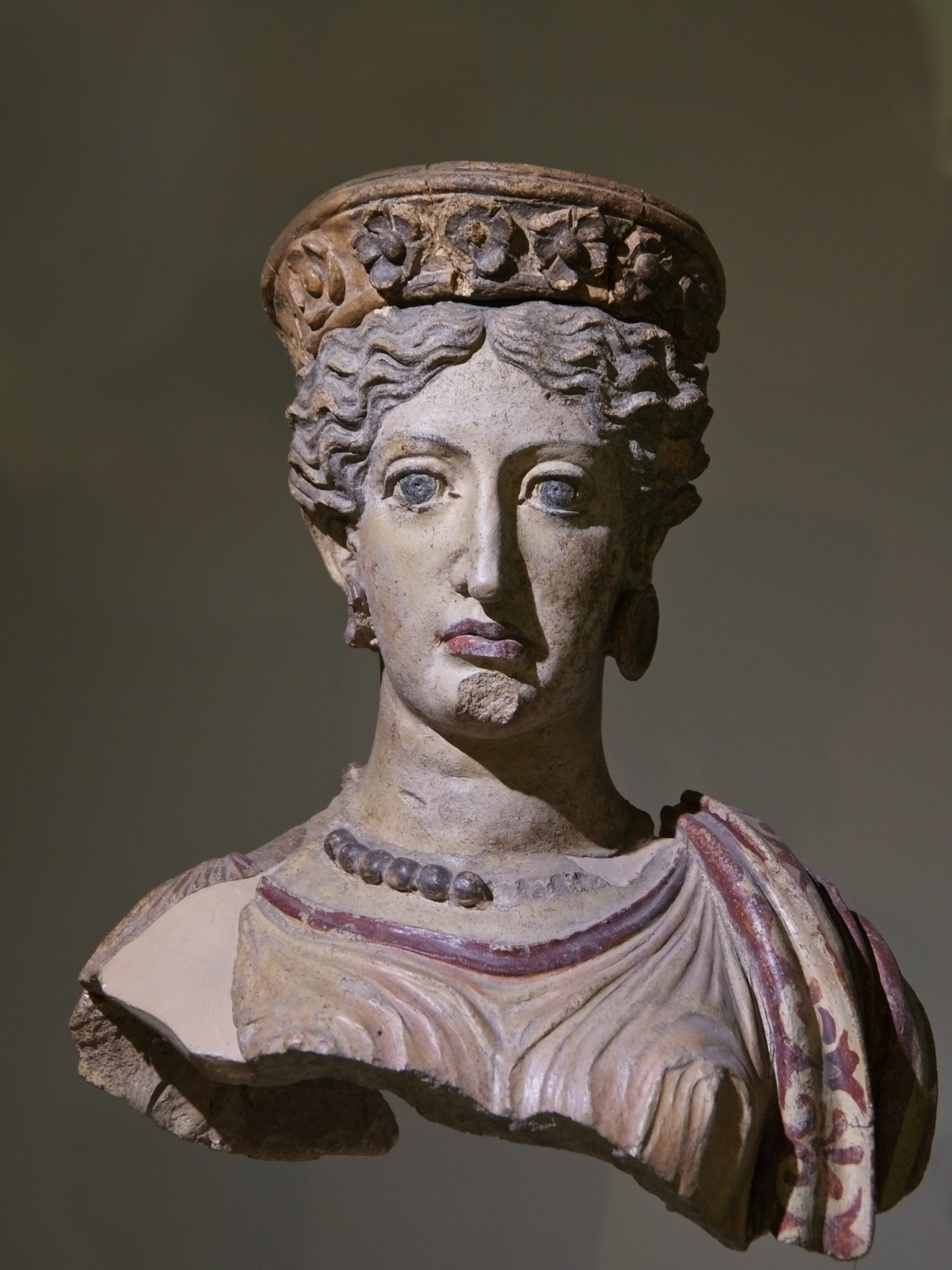
- Terracotta bust of Uni featured at the National Etruscan Museum of Villa Giulia, c. 380 BCE. Clothed in a dress featuring a peplum over the shoulder, a royal diadem, and jewellery.

Genealogy
- Parents: Satre
- Siblings: Tinia, Nethuns, Aita, Zerene
- Consort: Tinia

Equivalents
- Canaanite: Astarte
- Greek: Hera
- Roman: Juno

Uni (/ˈjuːnaɪ/) is the ancient goddess of marriage, fertility, family, and women in Etruscan religion and myth, and was the patron goddess of Perugia. She is identified as the Etruscan equivalent of Juno in Roman mythology, and Hera in Greek mythology. As the supreme goddess of the Etruscan pantheon, she is part of the Etruscan triad, an original precursor to the Capitoline Triad, made up of her husband Tinia, the god of the sky, and daughter Menrva, the goddess of wisdom.

She is often depicted with a goatskin cloak and sandals whilst holding a shield, similarly to Juno Sospita, wearing a bridal veil, or completely nude.

Livy states (Book V, Ab Urbe Condita) that Juno was an Etruscan goddess of the Veientes, who was adopted ceremonially into the Roman pantheon when Veii was sacked in 396 BC. This seems to refer to Uni. She also appears on the Liver of Piacenza.

== Etymology ==
The name Uni is of uncertain etymology, however may be related to the Proto-Indo-European adjective *h₂yéwHō 'young', connecting to her association with fertility, love, and marriage. In relation, it has also been suggested that the Latin Iuno (Juno) originated from Etruscan, changed from a feminine -i Etruscan ending.

== Mythology ==
As most of Etruscan literature has not survived through time, mythological stories involving the Etruscan gods have been largely interpreted through engraved scenes in bronze mirrors, and other mixed media artworks.

=== Uni and Hercle ===
A notable mirror from Volterra depicts Uni nursing an adult demigod Hercle (the Greek Heracles or Roman Hercules). Tinia, amongst other gods present at the scene, points to a tablet with the inscription indicating the significance of the event: "eca: sren: tva: iχnac hercle:unial clan: θra:sce" meaning "this picture shows how Hercle became Uni's son". In other depictions of this myth, deities such as Menrva, Turan, and Mean - the goddess of victory - are present as part of an animated crowd bearing witness to the adoption.

The motif of Hercle suckling Uni is understood as holding Greek origins, where counterpart Hera was unknowingly deceived by Zeus (Tinia) into nursing, and by that process adopting, an infant Heracles against her will.

Depiction of this myth in which the adoption process features an adult Hercle, and an obliging Uni is widely acknowledged as having developed entirely in Etruria. Most scholars view this interpretation of the myth as the Hercle's welcome initiation to godhood; it has also been suggested that the scene represents Uni and Hercle's reconciliation, where the Etruscan recount accurately represents the meaning of Hercle's Greek name "Glory of Hera".

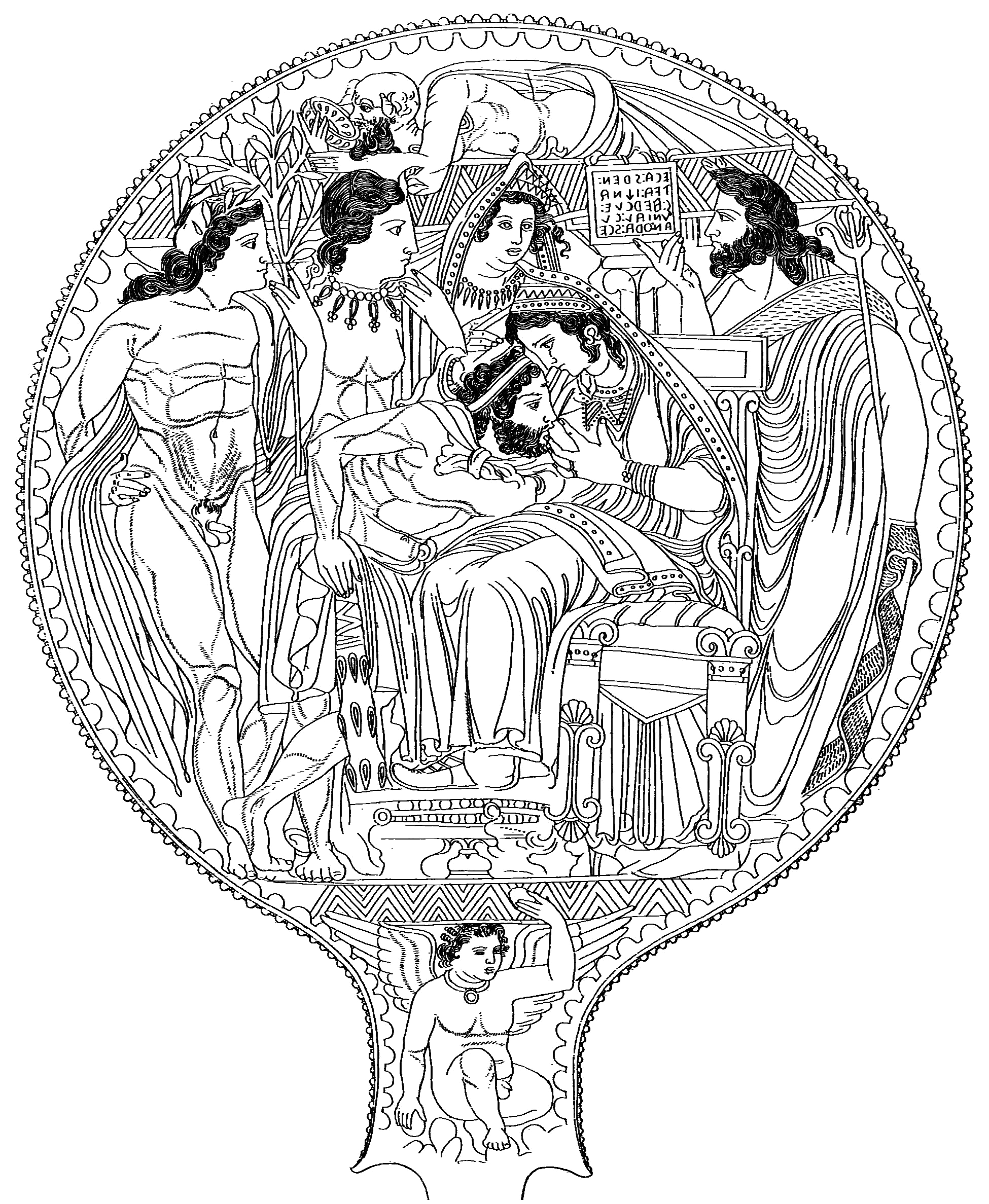
Bronze mirror from Volterra.

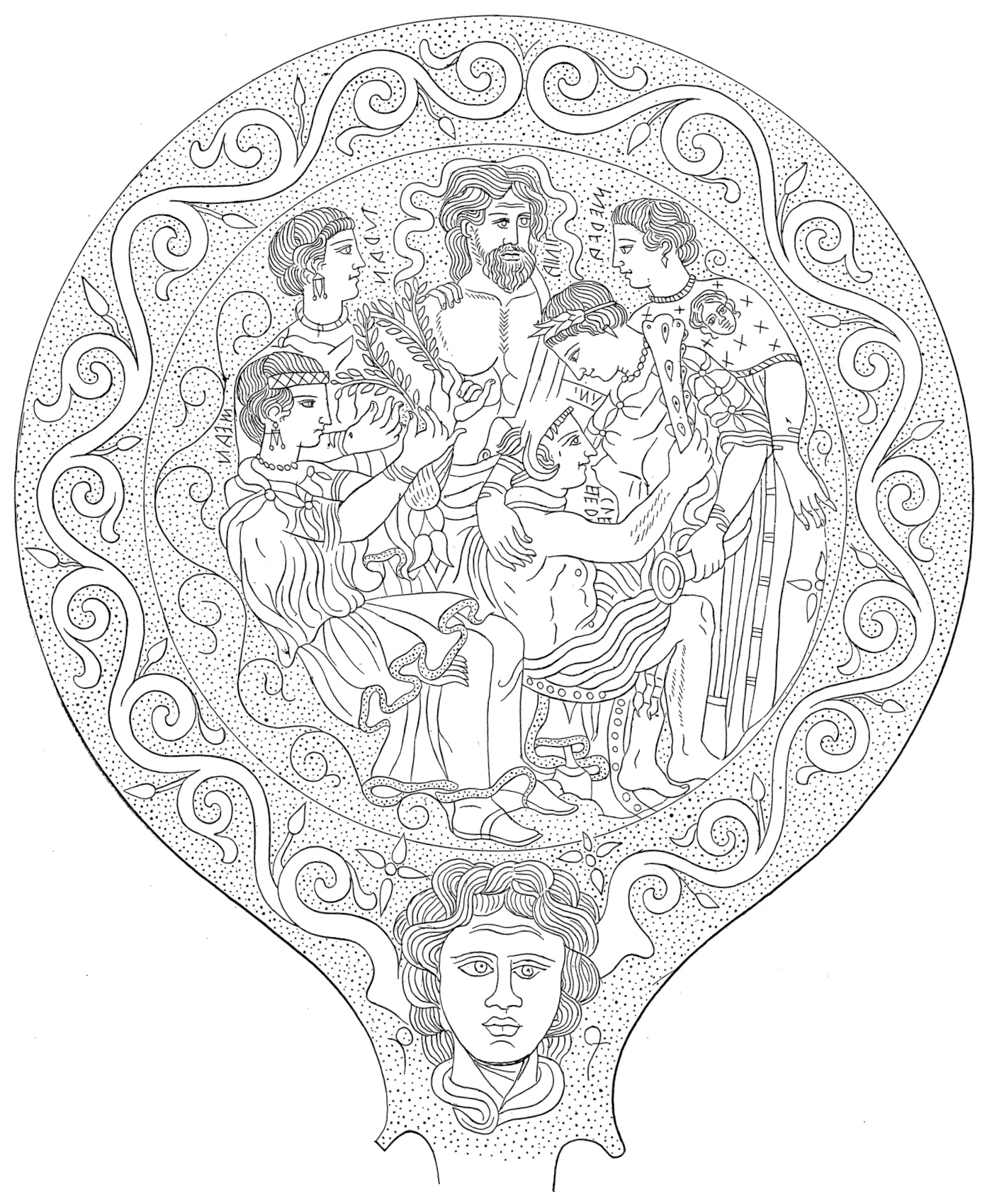
Bronze mirror depicting Uni nursing Hercle, featuring Tinia, Menrva, Turan, and Mean.

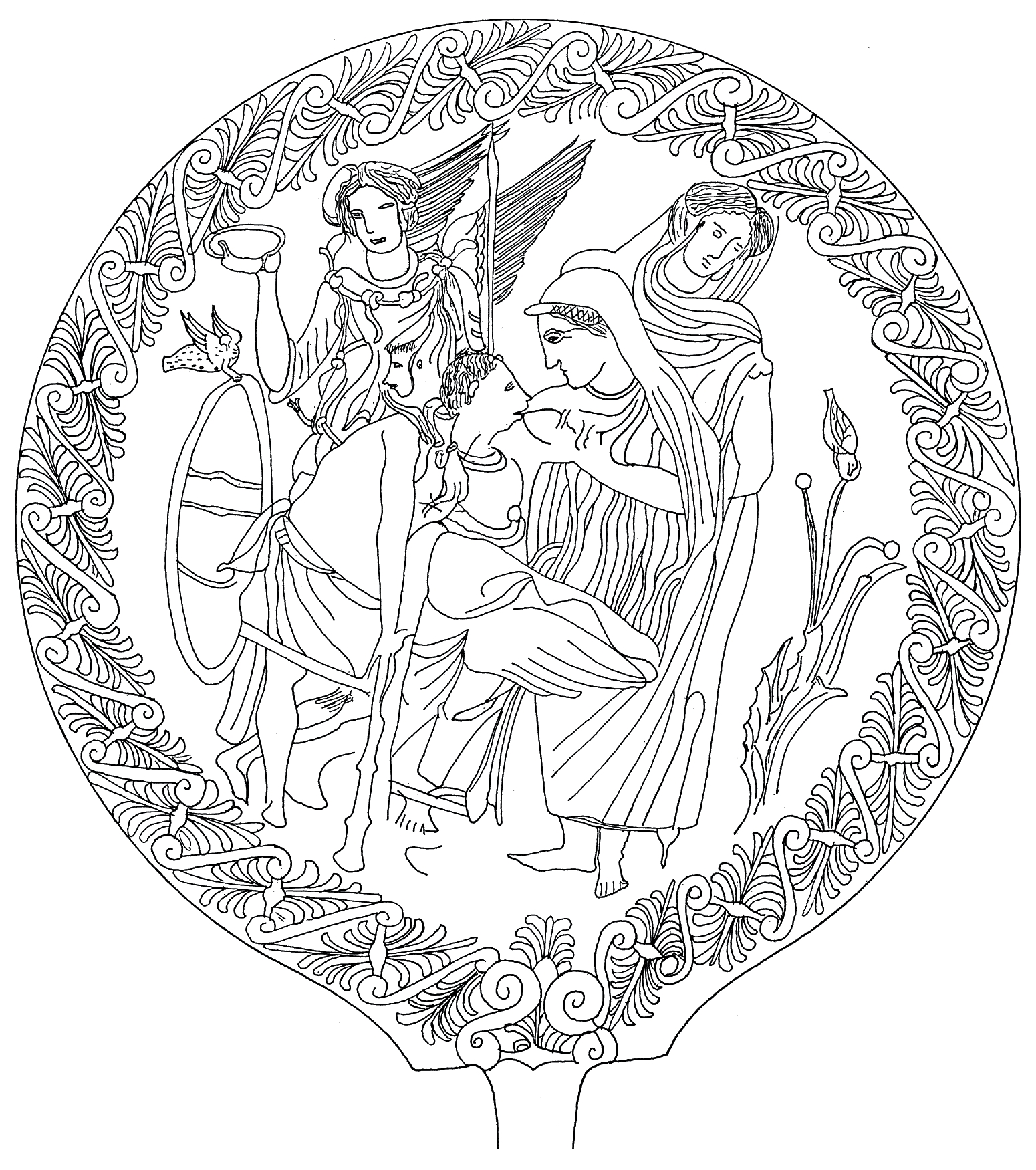
Uni nursing Hercle, from Tomb 65, Tarquina.

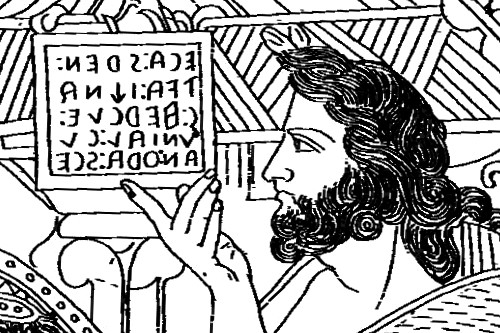
Detail of inscription on bronze mirror from Volterra, pointed to by Tinia.

=== The Judgement of Elcsntre ===
The Judgement of Elcsntre (equivalently known in Greek terms as the Judgement of Paris) is secondarily notable as a myth often represented on Etruscan terms through bronze mirrors. The major themes of the Greek myth remain intact; Elcsntre (Paris or Alexander = Elcsntre), as guided by Turms (Hermes), must choose who is ‘the fairest’ between Menrva, Uni, and Turan (Aphrodite) to be the recipient of a gifted egg (golden apple) which had been presented at the wedding of Peleus and Thetis. Where Elcsntre could not easily choose between the three goddesses, they then resorted to bribing him. Etruscan interpretation of the specific offerings presented is not clear due to the lack of written sources, and various different representations on a number of mirrors, however there are common representations of Menrva's and Turan's gifts in alignment with their Greek counterparts. Menrva's spear and a wreath are often depicted, as representative of offered glory in battle. Turan is often depicted holding branches of flowers and displaying her body, representative of her offering to Elcsntre the most beautiful women in the world as his wife. Uniquely, Uni is depicted in a different manner which does not entirely correspond to the Greek origin of the myth. Amongst different mirrors, she has been depicted as being nude, or fully clothed but holding a pomegranate branch with three pieces of fruit, which has generally not been interpreted as the offering of political power from the Greek myth. Instead rather while there is no clear assertion of her offering, it has been argued that these depictions demonstrate her unique Etruscan characteristics where she is more greatly associated with the fruits of fertility.

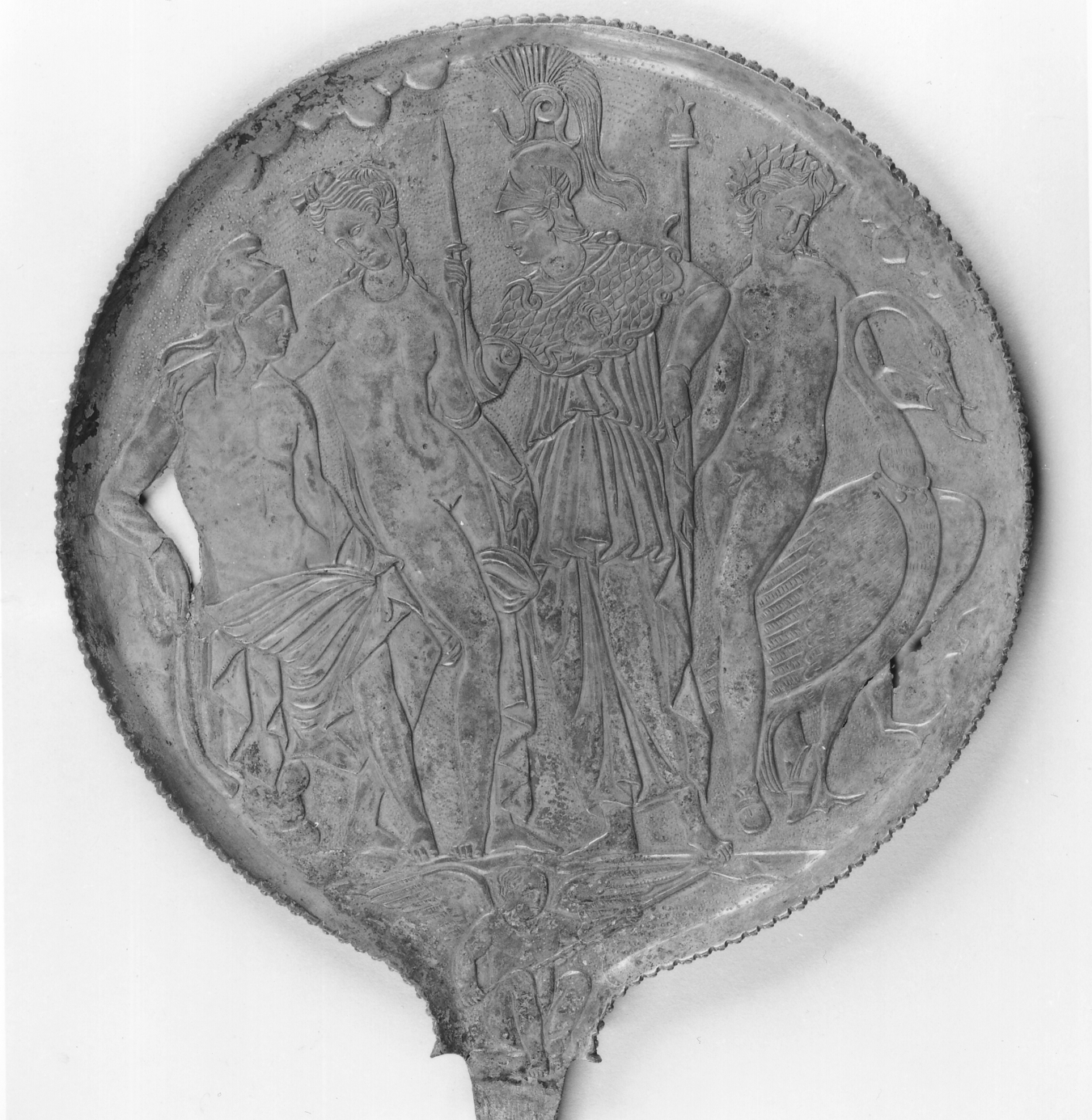
Bronze mirror depicting the Judgement of Elcsntre. Figures from left to right: Elcsntre, Uni, Menrva, unknown.

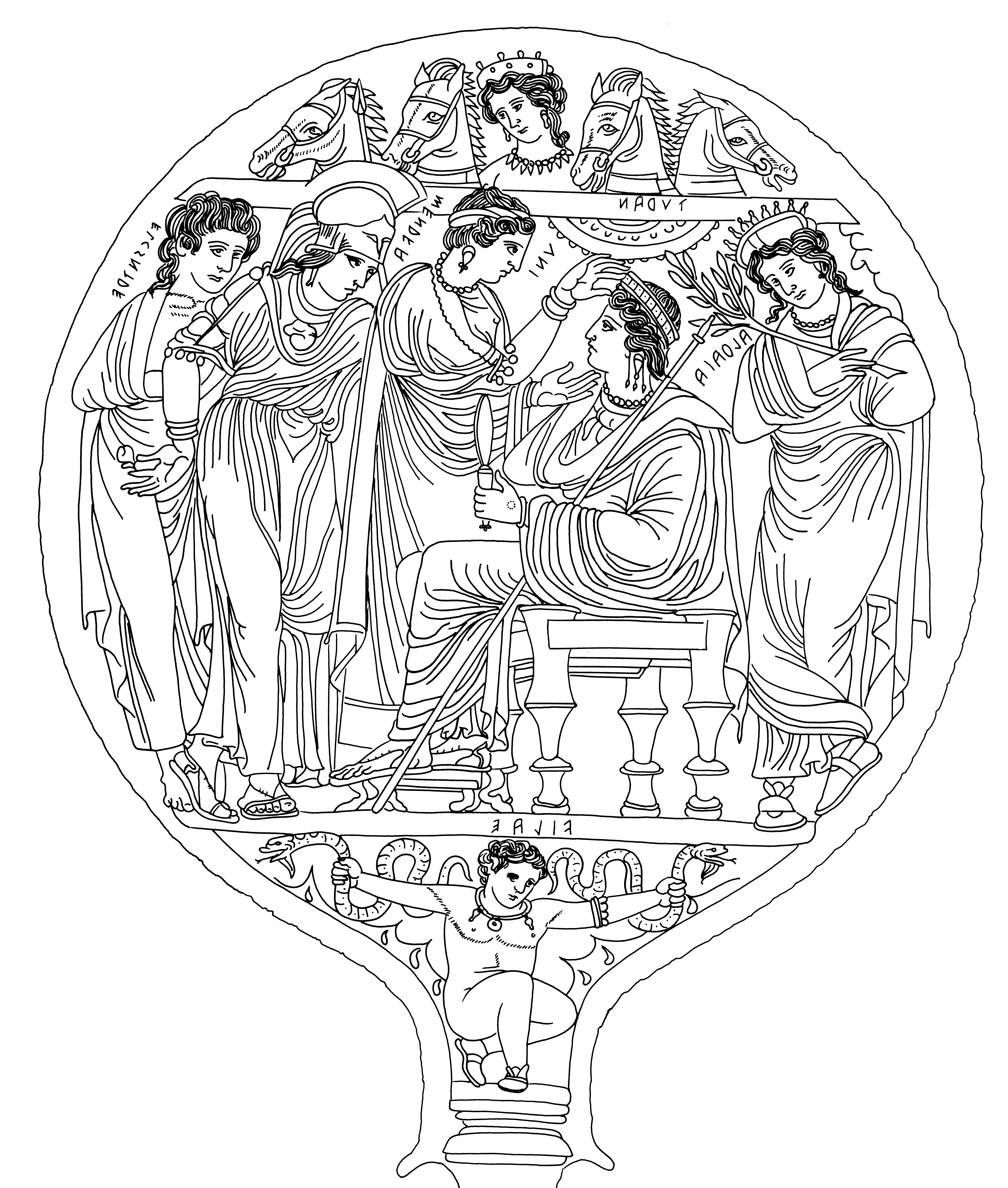
Bronze mirror depicting the Judgement of Elcsntre. Figures from left to right: Elscntre, Menrva, Turan, Althaia. A chariot is being drawn in the upper extremities of the mirror, and the lower extremities feature Vile strangling serpents.

== Trinity ==
Uni, alongside Tinia and Menrva, acts as one of the three deities which make up the Etruscan Trinity, equivalent to the Roman Capitoline Triad. Most scholars agree that this triad was imported by the Romans from original Etruscan custom, where Uni and Menrva traditionally played larger roles than their counterparts Juno and Minerva. Ancient sources have described the expectation of towns to dedicate temples to Tinia, Uni, and Menrva at the end of three roads, leading to three gates, as a part of Etrusca disciplina. Further, it was suggested by Vitruvius that these such temples should have been located on the most elevated sites of the town, and spread apart from one another.

== Cult ==
Uni was worshipped both individually at dedicated shrines, and alongside other deities as part of large public sanctuaries throughout Etruria. Established cults to Uni worshipped her status as a supreme goddess of family and reproduction.

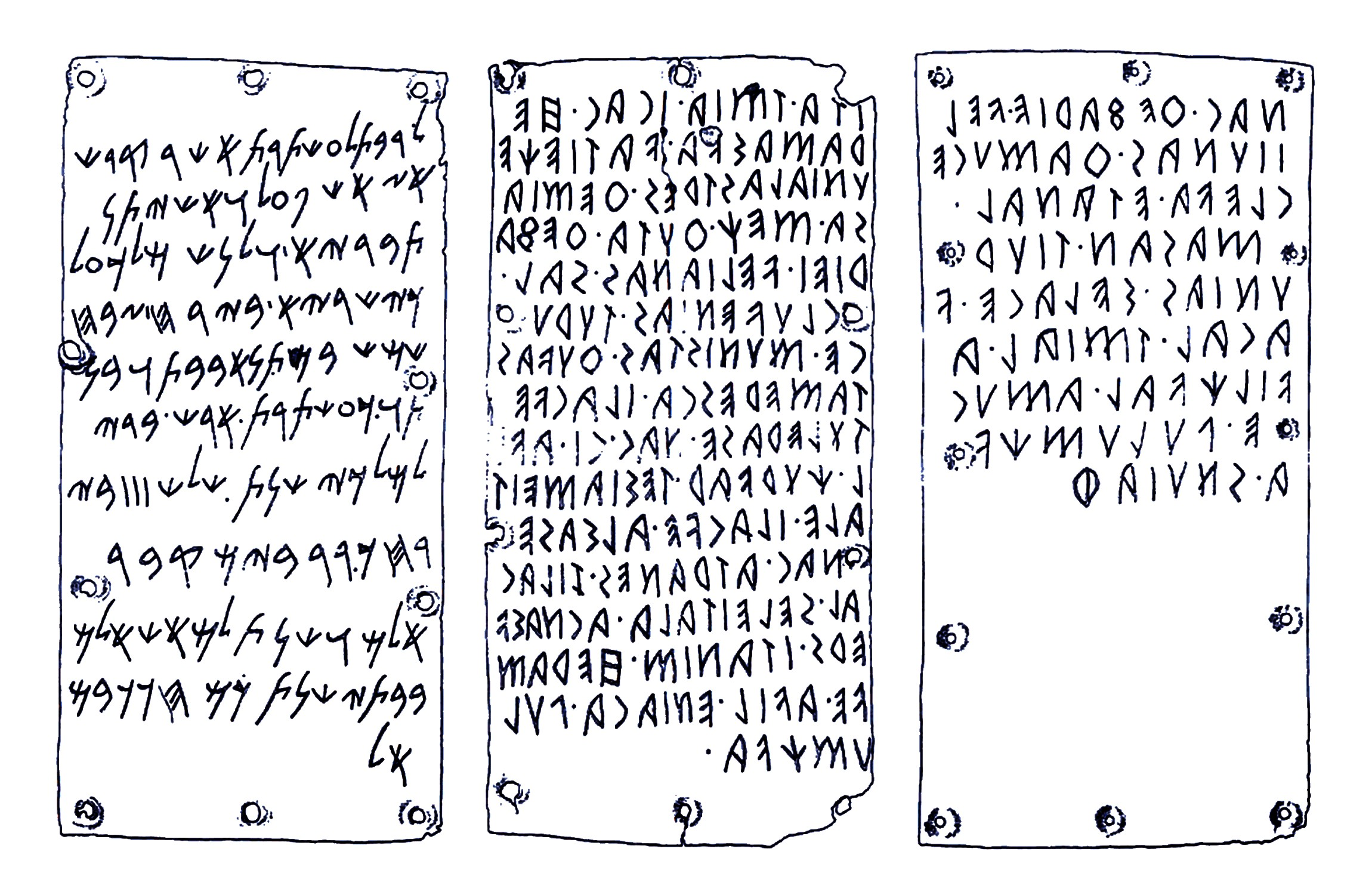
Copy of the Pyrgi tablets.

=== Shrine at Pyrgi ===
As part of a large Tuscan style temple, the north-located shrine at Pyrgi dedicated to Uni was built in approximately 500 BC, and neighboured a smaller Greek temple. Compared to other locations, the cult of worship dedicated to Uni at Pyrgi held close resemblance to traditional Greek worship sanctuaries; at least 300 votive objects were dedicated there, alongside animal bones suggestive of sacrifice. Additionally, two bowls made by the Etruscan Spurinas designated vota to Uni alongside Tinia and Thesan.

Three gold plaques were excavated from the site in 1964, two written in Etruscan, and one in Phoenecian. The two longer Etruscan and Phoenecian inscriptions clarify the dedication of the temple was to unialastres as the genitive form of uni-astre, an amalgamated goddess of the Etruscan Uni as uni and Phoenecian Astarte as astre. The dedication came from the ruler of Caere, in gratitude for her support of his reign. The shorter of the Etruscan inscriptions outlines distinct annual rituals which took place to ensure the ongoing purity of the temple.

=== Sanctuary at Gravisca ===
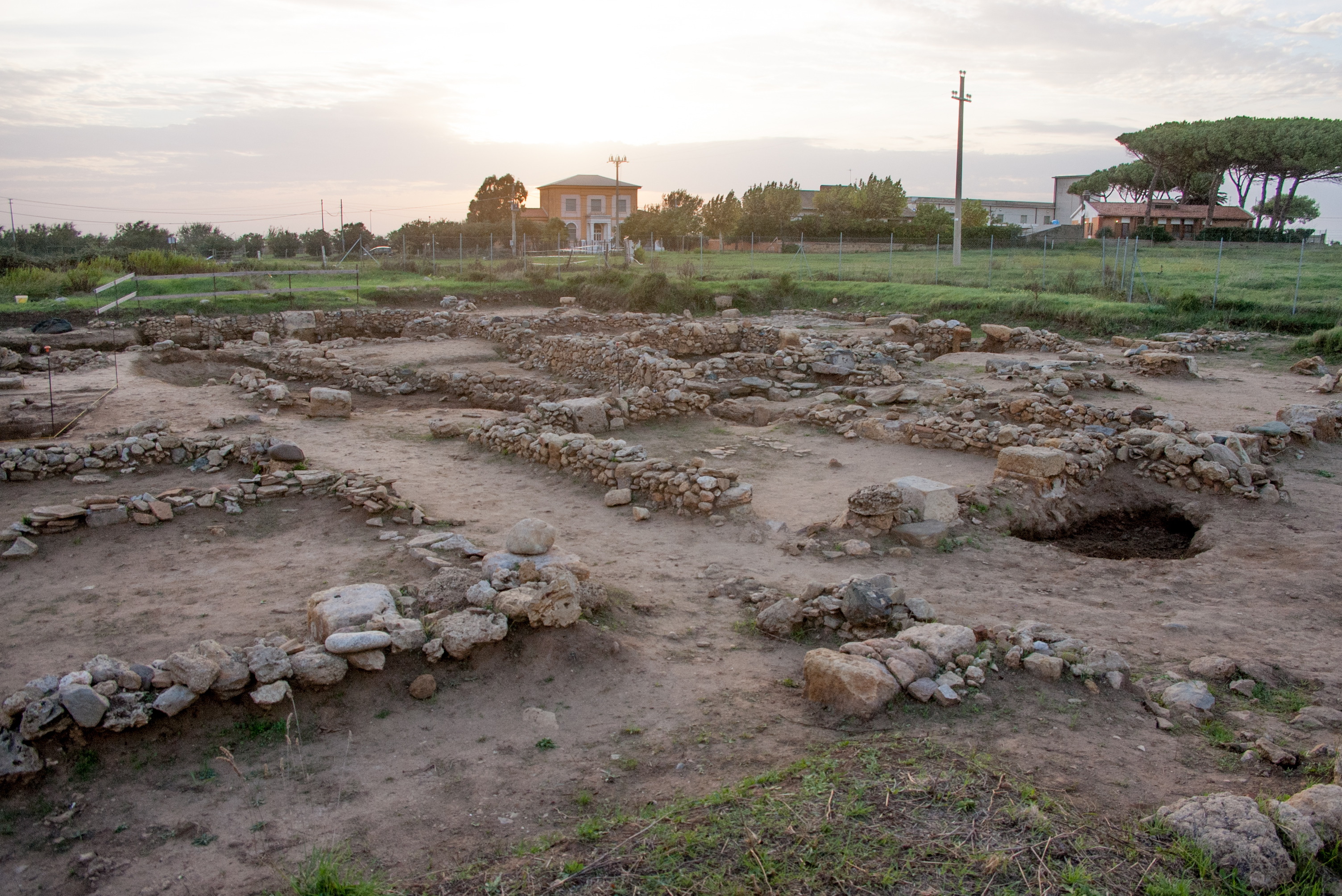
Excavations at Gravisca.

At the port of Gravisca in the 6th century BC, Uni was worshipped amongst other Etruscan and pan-Hellenic deities in a large network of sanctuaries. Dedication to Uni was aggregated in a singular room at the sanctuary in the southern area of the complex. Nearby, a similar room was dedicated individually to Turan. Both rooms featured statuettes of swaddled babies, and a myriad of votive anatomical dedications such as breasts and uteri. There is little difference between type of votive offering presented to Uni and Turan, however the numbers of these votives differentiate the rooms comparatively; 145 votive uteri were excavated from Uni's dedicated sanctuary, compared to the 74 recovered from Turan's. Additionally, 22 swaddled babies were found dedicated to Uni, where two were found dedicated to Turan. Both sanctuaries featured two votive breasts. It has been suggested that this difference could represent specialisation of offerings.

=== Poggio Colla ===
An Etruscan sanctuary at Poggio Colla, located near the town of Vicchio in the Mugello region of northern Tuscany, was part of an ongoing archaeological project run from 1995 until 2015 by the Mugello Valley Archaeological Project and Poggio Colla Field School (PCFS). Excavations over the 21-season project potentially suggested Uni as the nominal deity of the area, with the uncovering of a bucchero vase depicting a, potentially sacred, birth scene, ritual behaviour at west of the sanctuary's network, and other dedications made by women. In 2015, the Vicchio Stele was excavated from a temple on site, and recovered as one of the longest recorded sacred Etruscan texts thus far. The date extrapolated from letter-forms and punctuation, and the place in which it was found link the stele to have being presented at the sanctuary in its “phase 0” of architectural history; this phase predated stone architecture, and was characterised by huts. Inscriptions on the edges of the stele were written in a form of “pseudo-boustrophedon”, and potentially have up to 200 letters. Around 120 of these are legible. Etruscan archaeologist Adriano Maggiani has dated the inscription as being from 525 to 510 BCE., right before the building of the foundations in which it was placed

Translation of the stele is incomplete, but from preliminary readings, scholars have tentatively linked a reference to Uni, based on the way the stele was placed in the foundations of the temple, and where it may mention a goddess presiding over birth, potentially connecting her as the patron divinity of the cult at Poggio Colla, along with brief mention of her consort Tinia. Part of the text which has been deciphered seems to display requirements of practice for the cult, demanding two objects of something for Tinia, “in the place of Uni”.

Archeologists have stated that "The centre of worship was an underground fissure that was ritually treated after the destruction of the temple," and that. "Underground cults of this type were often associated with female divinities." The university of Florence is currently undertaking the process of 3D documentation of the Vicchio Stele in order to create a more complete reconstruction of the entire text.

== Regional placement in Heaven ==
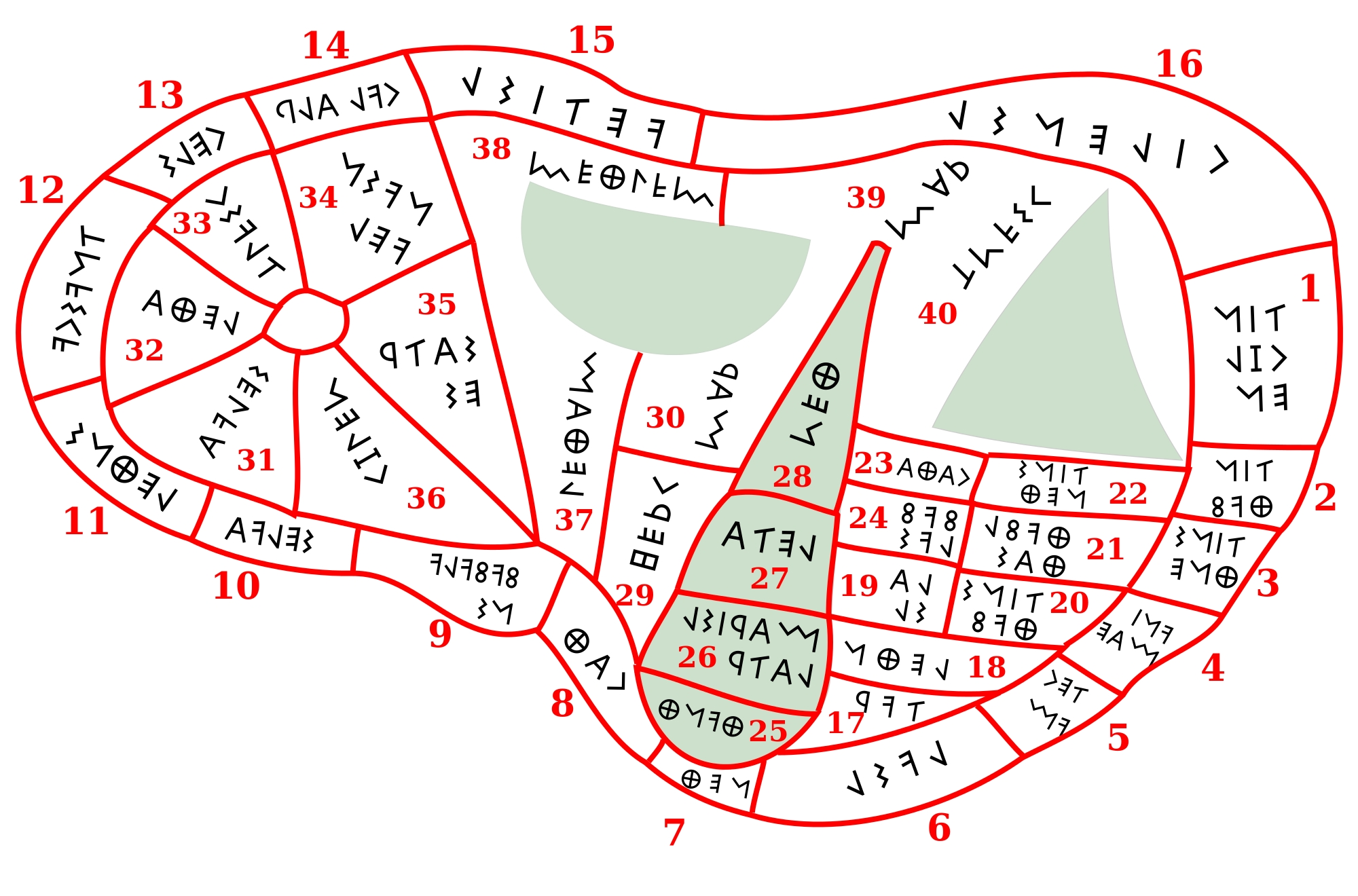
Diagram of the inscriptions on the Liver of Piacenza - Uni is representative of the fourth "house".

In a practice that has been argued by scholars as having originated in Etruria, Etrusca disciplina divided the Heavens into sixteen different cosmological regions. Reflected in the Piacenza Liver, deities were assigned respective ‘houses’ where labels were inscribed into the sixteen sections of the bronze work. Etruscan temples held no unified orientation; temples dedicated to Uni have commonly been found to be oriented southwest, and dedications to Tinia oriented south, unlike Greek temples which have been found to all be usually directed east. It is clear that the placements of deities in the Liver of Piacenza held influence over orientation and places of worship, however there has been some debate towards interpretation of the plate. Two predominant schools of thought have largely dominated readings of the regions of the Liver, however a third theory which somewhat reconciles the two mutually exclusive views has emerged as suggested by Stevens. This theory demonstrates Uni's placement in heavenly region number four as flexible with the seasons and in alignment with the difference in sunset and sunrise positions throughout the year. Where the temple of Fontanile di Legnisina dedicated to Uni found in Vulci, is located in the fixed terrestrial region number 10, and its entrance is opposite to region number 2 rather than 4, the non-corresponding position by two regions is explained by this theory of a “rotating Etruscan heaven”. Similarly, at Pyrgi, the orientation of a temple belonging to Uni is southeast. This positioning places it in fixed terrestrial regions 10 and 11 where opposite to the entrance, Uni's heavenly region number 4 is still evident in the terrestrial region number 2 to allow for seasonal fluctuation.

== See also ==
- Capitoline Triad
- Pyrgi Tablets
- Liver of Piacenza
