= Tinia =

Etruscan sky god

- sky god
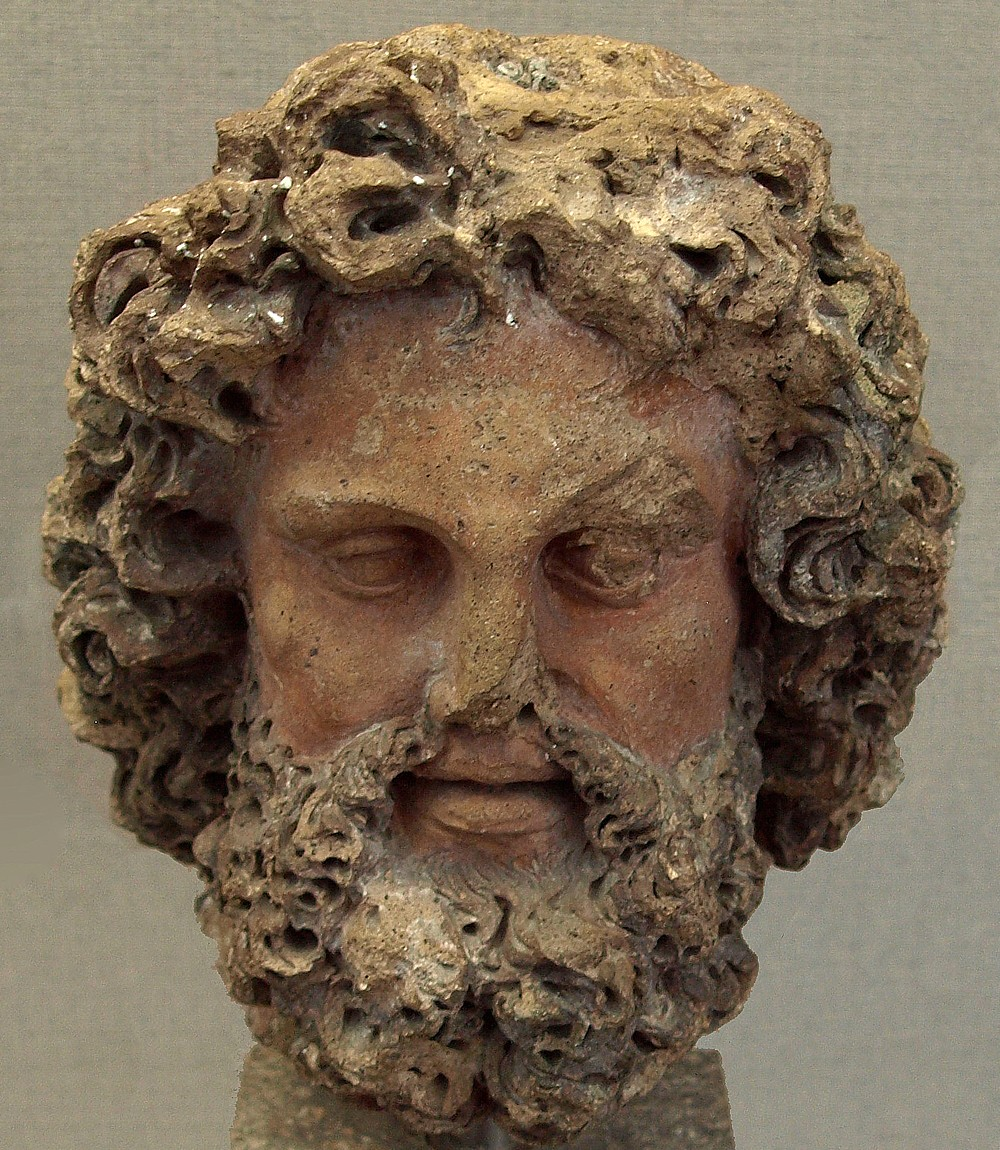
- Terracotta bust of Tinia from 300–250 BCE
- Symbol: Thunderbolt

Genealogy
- Consort: Uni
- Children: Hercle and Menrva

Equivalents
- Greek: Zeus
- Roman: Jupiter
- Egyptian: Amun

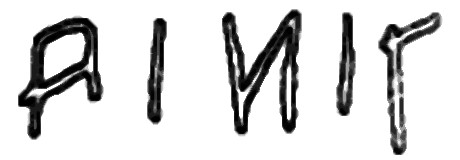
Etruscan inscription TINIA on an altar stone from Volsinii

Tinia (also Tin, Tinh, Tins or Tina) was the sky god and the highest deity in Etruscan religion, equivalent to the Roman Jupiter and the Greek Zeus.

However, a primary source from the Roman Varro states that Veltha, not Tins, was the supreme deity of the Etruscans. This has led some scholars to conclude that they were assimilated, but this is speculation.

Tinia was the husband of Uni and the father of Hercle.

The Etruscans had a group of nine gods who had the power of hurling thunderbolts; they were called Novensiles by the Romans. Of thunderbolts there were eleven sorts, of which Tinia wielded three.

Tinia was sometimes represented with a beard or sometimes as youthful and beardless. In terms of symbolism, Tinia has the thunderbolt. Tinia's thunderbolts could be red or blood coloured.

Like Selvans and possibly Laran, Tinia also protected boundaries. His name appears as the guarantor on three boundary stones with identical inscriptions found in Tunisia, originally placed there by the Etruscan colonists.

Some of Tinia's possible epithets are detailed on the Piacenza Liver, a bronze model of a liver used for haruspicy. These inscriptions have been transcribed as Tin Cilens, Tin Θuf and Tinś Θne. There have been a number of suggestions as to their meaning, but the Etruscan language is poorly understood and there is no scholarly consensus for the translation.

== Inscriptions ==
Tinia appears in several inscriptions, including:

- Kylix painted by Oltos (c. 500 BC):
  - Itun turuce venel atelinas Tinas cliniiaras.
  - This has given Venel Atelinas for the sons of Tin (ie: The Dioscuri)
- On the bronze Chimera of Arezzo:
  - Tinscvil
  - A gift to Tins
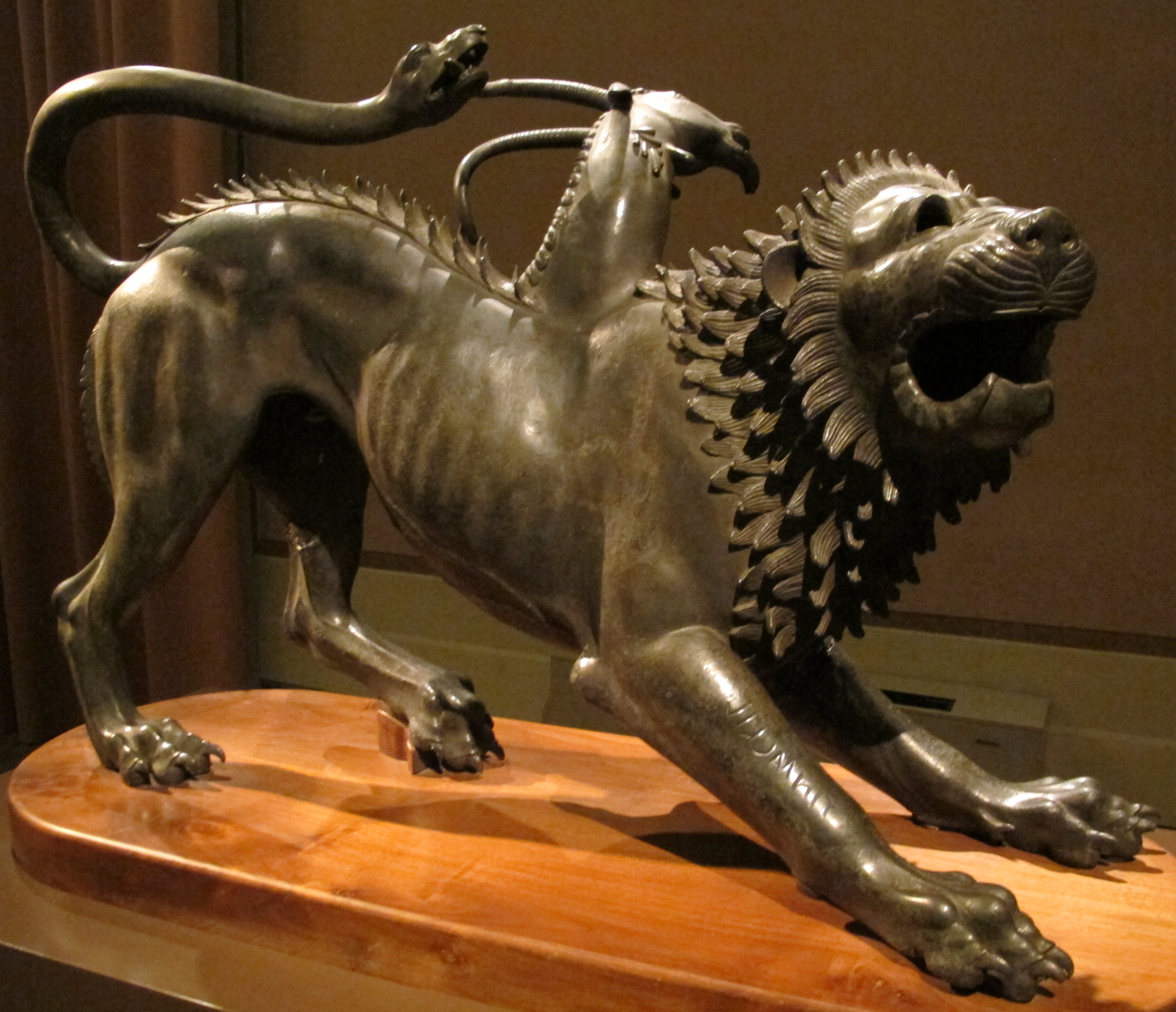
The Chimera of Arezzo

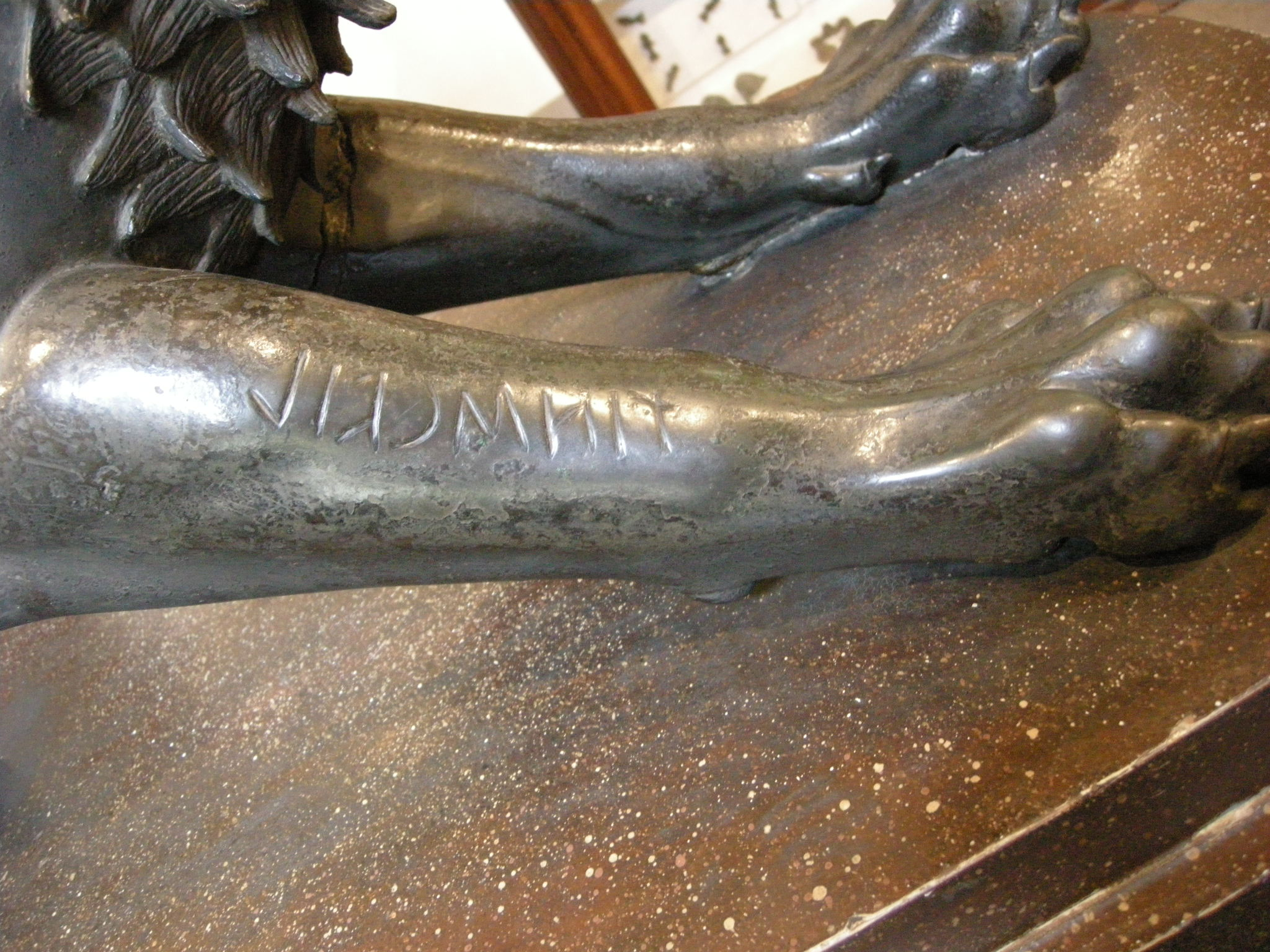
TINSCVIL inscription on foreleg

== See also ==
- Etruscan religion
- Etruscan civilization
- Uni
- Hercle
- Novensiles
