= List of Etruscan mythological figures =

This is a list of deities and legendary figures found in Etruscan mythology.

The names below were taken mainly from Etruscan "picture bilinguals", which are Etruscan call-outs on art depicting mythological scenes or motifs. Several different media provide names. Variants of the names are given, reflecting differences in language in different localities and times.

Many of the names are Etruscan spellings (and pronunciations) of Greek names. The themes may or may not be entirely Greek. Etruscans frequently added their own themes to Greek myths. The same may be said of native Italic names rendered into Etruscan. Some names are entirely Etruscan, which is often a topic of debate in the international forum of scholarship.

== Deities ==
Deity	Description
Achlae	Greek river god Achelous.
Achvizr, Achuvesr, Achuvizr, Achviztr	Unknown character associated with Turan. It may be one of the Samothracian Great Gods or Cabeiri (Άξίερος, perhaps from *Aχsiver-) according to É. Benveniste.
ais (pl. aiser), eis (pl. eisar)	general term for gods.
aiser si	gods of light.
aiser seu	gods of darkness.
Aita, Eita	Epithet of Śuri, Etruscan equivalent of the Greek god of the underworld and ruler of the dead, Hades.
Alpanu, Alpan, Alpnu	Etruscan goddess, whose name is identical to Etruscan "willingly".
Aminth	Etruscan winged deity in the form of a child, probably identified with Amor.
Ani	Divinity named on the periphery of the Piacenza Liver as dominant in that section. It seems to correspond to Martianus Capella's Templum I, north, ruled by Janus, for which Ani appears to be the Etruscan word.
Apulu, Aplu	Epithet of Śuri, Etruscan equivalent to the god Apollo.
Apru	Alternate Etruscan spelling of Aphrodite. See Turan.
Aril	Etruscan deity identified with Atlas.
Aritimi, Artumes	The goddess Artemis.
Athrpa	The goddess Atropos, one of the Moirai.
Calu	Epithet of Śuri, Etruscan infernal god of wolves, represented by a wolf. Associated with Tinia and Selvans.
Catha, Cavtha, Cath	An Etruscan deity, god and goddess, not well represented in the art. She appears in the expression ati cath, "Mother Cath" and also maru Cathsc, "the maru of Cath". The nature of the maru is not known. She is also called śech, "daughter," which seems to fit Martianus Capella's identification of the ruler of Region VI of the sky as Celeritas solis filia, "Celerity the daughter of the sun." In the Piacenza Liver the corresponding region is ruled by Cath. Van der Meer considers Cautha/Cavtha/Cavatha to be a separate deity from Cath(a), the former being a kind of Aurora or "eye of the sun" as well as an underworld deity who is paired with Śuri.
Cel	Etruscan earth goddess, probably identified with Ge, as she had a giant for a son. Her name occurs in the expression ati Cel, "Mother Cel."
Crapsti	Jupiter-like deity in Liber Linteus, the name seems to be from an Umbrian local deity Grabouie.
Culsans, Culsu	Two-faced god of doors and doorways, corresponding to the two-faced Roman god Janus. culscva is Etruscan for "doors, gates."
Eita	Greek Hades seen on the Golini Tomb with Persephone (here Phersipnei) See Aita above
Enie	Greek Enyo, one of the Graeae.
Eris	The goddess Eris.
Erus	The god Eros.
Esplace	The legendary healer, Asklepios.
Ethausva, Eth	Etruscan goddess, attendant at the birth of Menrva.
Euturpa, Euterpe	The Greek goddess Euterpe.
Feronia	An obscure rural goddess primarily known from the various Roman cults who worshipped her.
Fufluns	Etruscan god of wine, identified with Dionysus. The name is used in the expressions Fufluns Pacha (Bacchus) and Fufluns Pachie. Puplona (Populonia) was named from Fufluns.
Horta	Goddess of agriculture (highly conjectural).
Hercle, Hercele, Herecele, Herkle, Hrcle	Etruscan form of the Greek hero Hēraklēs, Roman Hercules. With Perseus, the main Etruscan hero, the adopted son of Uni/Juno, who suckled the adult Hercle. His image appears more often than any other on Etruscan carved hardstones. His name appears on the bronze Piacenza Liver, used for divination (hepatoscopy), a major element of Etruscan religious practice.
Ilithiia	The goddess of childbirth, known to the Greeks as Eileithyia. Occurs also in the expression flereś atis ilithiial, "statue of mother Eileithyia."
Laran	Etruscan god of war.
Lasa	One of a class of deities, plural Lasas, mainly female, but sometimes male, from which the Roman Lares came. Where the latter were the guardians of the dead, the Etruscan originals formed the court of Turan. Lasa often precedes an epithet referring to a particular deity: Lasa Sitmica, Lasa Achununa, Lasa Racuneta, Lasa Thimrae, Lasa Vecuvia.
Lasa Vecuvia	Goddess of prophecy, associated with the nymph Vegoia. See under Begoë.
Leinth	Etruscan divinity, male and female, possibly related to lein, Etruscan word for "to die", but does not appear in any death scenes.
Letham, Lethns, Letha, Lethms, Leta	An Etruscan infernal goddess.
Letun	The goddess known to the Greeks as Leto.
Lur	Underworld deity of prophecy and of war, whose cult may have involved human sacrifice. His name may mean "pale" (in contrast to Śuri "black]]).
Malavisch	Etruscan divinity of the mirrors, probably from malena, "mirror."
Mania	Etruscan infernal deity, forming a dyad with Manth (Latin: Mantus). She went on into Latin literature, ruling beside Mantus and was reported to be the mother of the Lares and Manes. Under the Etruscan kings, she received the sacrifices of slain children during the Laralia festival of May 1.
Manth	Latin: Mantus. Epithet of Śuri, Etruscan infernal deity, one of a dyad including Mania. A tradition of Latin literature names the Etruscan city of Manthua, later Mantua, after the deity.
Mariś, Maris	A class of divinity used with epithets: mariś turans, mariś husurnana, mariś menitla, mariś halna, mariś isminthians. The appearances in art are varied: a man, a youth, a group of babies cared for by Menrva. The Roman god, Mars, is believed to have come from this name. Pallottino refers to the formation of a god by "... fusing groups of beings ... into one." Of Mars he says "... the protecting spirits of war, represented as armed heroes, tend to coalesce into a single deity, the Etrusco-Roman Mars, on the model of the Greek god Ares." But L. Bonfane writes: "Mariś is not Mars, but a local divinity who, according to one interpretation, lived for the considerable period of 130 years, and had three lives." The roots of the Italic god end in a -t, while no such ending is visible in the Etruscan form, which instead has in -i not seen in the Italic forms.
Mean, Meanpe	Etruscan deity, equivalent of Nike or Victoria.
Menerva, Menrva	The Etruscan original to the Roman Minerva, made into Greek Athena.
Munthukh	Goddess of love and health, and one of the attendants of Turan
Nethuns	Italic divinity, probably Umbrian, of springs and water, identified with Greek Poseidon and Roman Neptune, from which the name comes. It occurs in the expression flere Nethuns, "the divinity of Nethuns."
Nortia	Goddess of fate and chance. Unattested in Etruscan texts but mentioned by Roman historian Livy. Her attribute was a nail, which was driven into a wall in her temple during the Etruscan new year festival as a fertility rite.
Pacha	Roman Bacchus, an epithet of Fufluns.
Pemphetru	Greek Pemphredo, one of the Graeae.
Phersipnai, Phersipnei, Persipnei, Proserpnai	Queen of the underworld, equivalent to the Greek Persephone and Roman Proserpina.
Phersu	A divinity of the mask, probably from Greek πρόσωπον 'face". The god becomes adjectival, *phersuna, from which Latin persona.
Prumathe	The Greek mythological figure Prometheus.
Rath	Epithet of Śuri, Etruscan deity identified with Apollo. Tarquinia was his sanctuary.
Satre	Etruscan deity, source of, or derived from, the Roman god Saturn.
Selvans	God who appears in the expression Selvansl Tularias, "Selvans of the boundaries", which identifies him as a god of boundaries. But also Selvans Calusta (see Calus above). The name is either borrowed from the Roman god, Silvanus or the original source of the Roman god's name.
Sethlans	Etruscan blacksmith and craftsman god, often wielding an axe. Equivalent to the Greek Hephaistos and Roman Vulcanus.
Summanus	Etruscan god of nocturnal thunder, often said to be Zeus's twin or opposite.
Śuri	An oracular, chthonic Apollo, probably corresponding to Faliscan Soranus/Dīs Pater. The name is from Etruscan sur- "black," and may contrast with another deity, Lur whose name probably means "pale." One of his epithets may be Savcne, since the two appear together on a bronze oracle sheet from an are called in ancient times "Sorrina" possibly from Etruscan *Surrina.
Svutaf	A winged Etruscan deity whose name, if from the same Latin root as the second segment of persuade, might mean "yearning" and therefore be identifiable with Eros.
Tecum	God of the lucomenes, or ruling class.
Thalna, Thalana, Talna	Etruscan divine figure of multiple roles shown male, female, and androgynous. They attend the births of Menrva and Fufluns, dance as a Maenad and expound prophecy. In Greek θάλλειν 'to bloom'. A number of divinities fit the etymology: Greek Thallo and Hebe, and Roman Iuventas, "youth."
Thanr	An Etruscan deity shown present at the births of deities.
Thesan	Etruscan goddess of the dawn. She was identified with the Roman Aurora and Greek Eos.
Thetlvmth	Unknown deity of the Piacenza Liver, which is not a picture bilingual.
Thufltha	Unknown deity of the Piacenza Liver, which is not a picture bilingual.
Tinia, Tina, Tin	Chief Etruscan god, the ruler of the skies, husband of Uni, and father of Hercle, identified with the Greek Zeus and Roman Jupiter well within the Etruscan window of ascendance, as the Etruscan kings built the first temple of Jupiter at Rome. Called apa, "father" in inscriptions (parallel to the -piter in Ju-piter), he has most of the attributes of his Indo-European counterpart, with whom some have postulated a more remote linguistic connection. The name means "day" in Etruscan. He is the god of boundaries and justice. He is depicted as a young, bearded male, seated or standing at the center of the scene, grasping a stock of thunderbolts. According to Latin literature, the bolts are of three types: for warning, good or bad interventions, and drastic catastrophes. Unlike Zeus, Tin needs the permission of the Dii Consentes (consultant gods) and Dii Involuti (hidden gods – Graeae?) to wield the last two categories. A further epithet, Calusna (of Calu), hints at a connection to wolves or dogs and the underworld.
Tiur, Tivr, Tiv	Etruscan deity identified with Greek Selene and Roman Luna (goddess).
Tlusc, Tluscv, Mar Tlusc	Unknown deity of the Piacenza Liver, which is not a picture bilingual. The corresponding region in Martianus Capella is ruled by Sancus, an Italic god and Sabine progenitor, who had a temple on the Quirinal Hill, and appears on an Etruscan boundary stone in the expression Selvans Sanchuneta, in which Sanchuneta seems to refer to the oaths establishing the boundary. Sancus probably comes from Latin sancīre, "to ratify an oath."
Turan	Etruscan goddess identified with Greek Aphrodite and Roman Venus. She appears in the expression, Turan ati, "Mother Turan", equivalent to Venus Genetrix. Her name is a noun meaning "the act of giving" in Etruscan, based on the verb stem Tur- 'to give.'
Turmś, Turms	Etruscan god identified with Greek Hermes and Roman Mercurius. In his capacity as guide to the ghost of Tiresias, who has been summoned by Odysseus, he is Turms Aitas, "Turms Hades."
Turnu	An Etruscan deity, a type of Eros, child of Turan.
TV[?]th	Unknown deity of the Piacenza Liver, which is not a picture bilingual.
Uni	Supreme goddess of the Etruscan pantheon, wife of Tinia, mother of Hercle, and patroness of Perugia. With Tinia and Menrva, she was a member of the ruling triad of Etruscan deities. Uni was the equivalent of the Greek Hera and the Roman Juno, from whose name the name Uni may be derived.
Usil	Epithet of Śuri, Etruscan deity identified with Greek Helios, Roman Sol.
Vea	Etruscan divinity, possibly taking its name from the city of Veii or vice versa.
Veltha, Velthume, Vethune, Veltune	Etruscan deity, possible state god of the Etruscan league of Etruria, the Voltumna in the Latin expression Fanum Voltumnae, "shrine of Voltumna", which was their meeting place, believed located at Orvieto. The identification is based on reconstruction of a root *velthumna from Latin Voltumna, Vertumnus, and Voltumnus of literary sources, probably from Etruscan veltha, "earth" or "field". Representations of a bearded male with a long spear suggest Velthune may be an epithet of Tinia.
Vēiove, Vēive, Veivis, Vetis	Epithet of Śuri, Etruscan infernal deity whose temple stood at Rome near the Capitoline Hill. The identification is made from the deity's Latin names related by a number of ancient authors over the centuries: Vēi, Vēdi, Vēdii, Veiovis, Vediovis, Vediiovis, Vedius.
Vesuna	Italic goddess mentioned also in the Iguvine Tables.
Zerene	Macedonian goddess Zeirene Eleusia, Latin Ceres.

== Deified mortals ==
Name	Description
Calanice	A Greek title for Hercle, Kallinikos.
Castur	Castor, one of the mythological twins.
Catmite	The Trojan youth, Ganymede, from an alternative Greek spelling, Gadymedes. From the Etruscan is Latin Catamitus.
Pultuce, Pulutuce, Pulutuke, Pultuke	Pollux, one of the mythological twins, Greek Polydeuces.
Rathmtr	Rhadamanthys, the Greek mythological character, judge of the dead.
Tinas cliniar	Etruscan expression, "sons of Tina", designating the Dioscuri, proving that Tin was identified with Zeus.

== Spirits, demons, and other creatures ==
Name	Description
Aulunthe	Etruscan, the name of a satyr.
Begoë, Vegoia	Etruscan nymph believed to have power over lightning. She was also said to have composed a tract known as Ars Fulguritarum ("Art of the Thunderstruck"), which was included in the Roman pagan canon, along with the Sibylline Books. These are merely versions of the Latin names for the Etruscan nymph Lasa Vecuvia (see below).
Calaina	The Greek Nereid, Galene.
Celsclan	Etruscan Gigas, "son of Cel", identifying her as "Earth", as the giants in Greek mythology were the offspring of the earth.
Chaluchasu	Translation of Greek panchalkos, "wholly of bronze", perhaps the robot of Crete, Talos.
Charun, Charu	The mythological figure, Charon.
Chelphun	An Etruscan satyr.
Culsu	Also Cul. A female underworld demon who was associated with gateways. Her attributes included a torch and scissors. She was often represented next to Culsans.
Evan	An attendant on Turan, sometimes male, sometimes female.
Farthan	spirit, genius (used in Liber Linteus in phrases like farthan in Crapsti "the spirit which (is) in Craps"
Hathna	Etruscan satyr.
Iynx	An Etruscan mythological creature, a bird of love.
Man, Mani	Etruscan class of spirits representing "the dead" and yet not the same as a hinthial, "ghost." From the Mani came the Latin Manes, which are both "the good" and the deified spirits of the dead.
Metus	The Gorgon Medusa. The head appears on the Aegis of Menrva as a Gorgoneion.
Pecse, Pakste	The name of the legendary winged horse, Pegasus, assigned by the Etruscans to the Trojan Horse.
Puanea	Etruscan name of a satyr.
Sime	An Etruscan satyr who has a Greek name.
Thevrumines	Minotaur
Tuchulcha	An Etruscan daemon.
Tusna	Perhaps from *Turansna, "of Turan." The swan of Turan.
Vanth	Etruscan winged demon of the underworld often depicted in the company of Charun. She could be present at the moment of death, and frequently acted as a guide of the deceased to the underworld.
Vecu, Vecui, Vecuvia, Vegoia	The prophetic nymph Vegoia. See under Lasa Vecuvia, Begoë.

== Places ==
Name	Description
Achrum, Acharum	Legendary Greek river of the underworld, the Acheron.
Hipece	The magic spring, Hippocrene, represented in Etruscan art as a water spout in the form of a lion's head.
Truia, Truials	Troy, Trojan, the city of the Iliad.

== Mortals ==
Name	Description
Achle, Achile	Legendary hero of the Trojan War, from the Greek Achilles.
Achmemrun	Legendary king of Mycenaean Greece, from the Greek Agamemnon.
Aivas Tlamunus, Aivas Vilates	Also Eivas or Evas. Etruscan equivalents of the Greek heroes Ajax, son of Telamon and Ajax, son of Oileus.
Alchumena	The Greek legendary character, Alcmena.
Alcstei, Alcsti	The Greek legendary character, Alcestis.
Alichsantre, Alechsantre, Alcsentre, Elchsntre, Elachśantre Elachśntre, Elcste	The Trojan legendary character, Alexandrus, otherwise known as Paris.
Alpunea	Prophetess, probably equivalent to the Latin Sybil Albunea, whose oracular sanctuary was in Tivoli, just east of Rome. She is sometimes pictured with the seer Umaele (on whom see below).
Althaia	The Greek figure Althaea, mother of Meleager.
Amuce, Amuche, Amuke	The Greek legendary figure Amycus of the Argonauts myth.
Areatha	The mythological figure Ariadne.
Ataiun	The mythological figure Actaeon.
Atlenta, Atlnta	The mythological person Atalanta.
Atmite	The legendary character Admetus.
Atunis	The mythological figure Adonis.
Aturmica	The mythological figure Andromache, the Amazon.
Capne, Kapne	The legendary hero Capaneus.
Caśntra	Cassandra, prophetess of the Trojan War.
Cerca	Enchantress of the Odyssey Circe.
Cilens	Also written Celens.
Cluthumustha, Clutmsta	The female legendary character, Clytemnestra.
Crisitha	The heroine of the Trojan War, the Greek name Chryseis.
Easun, Heasun, Heiasun	Etruscan version of the mythological hero Jason.
Ecapa	The tragic heroine of the Trojan War, Hecuba.
Ectur	Hector, a hero of the Trojan War.
Elinei, Elinai, Elina	The character Helen of Trojan War fame.
Epiur, Epeur	Greek epiouros, "guardian", a boy presented to Tinia by Hercle, possibly Tages.
Ermania	legendary character Hermione, daughter of Menelaus and Helen.
Etule	Greek Aitolos, confused with his brother, Epeios, who built the Trojan horse.
Evtucle, Evthucle, Thucle	The hero Eteocles.
Hamphiare, Amphare	Legendary seer Amphiaraus.
Lasa Vecuvia	Prophetess who revealed the nature of the Etruscan Arrun Veltumnus; Equivalent to the Latin nymph Begoe or Vegoia. Attendant to Minerva.
Latva	Greek Leda, mother of Helen and the Dioscuri.
Lunc, Lnche	The legendary figure Lynceus.
Meleacr	The legendary figure known to the Greeks as Meleager.
Memnum, Memrum	Memnon, King of the Aethiopians . Fought Achle; Memnun's mother begged Tinia (Zeus) to spare his life in what is known as the Kerostasia/Psychostasia.
Menle	The hero Menelaus of Trojan War fame.
Metaia, Metua, Metvia	The mythological character Medea.
Mlacuch	A young Etruscan woman kidnapped by Hercle.
Nestur	The legendary hero Nestor.
Palmithe, Talmithe	The hero Palamedes.
Pantasila, Pentasila	The Greek name, Penthesilea, queen of the Amazons.
Patrucle	Patroclus of Trojan War fame.
Pava Tarchies	Etruscan Tarchies in an expression: "boy Tarchies." See under Tarchies.
Pele	The hero Peleus.
Perse, Pherse	The mythological hero Perseus.
Phaun, Faun, Phamu	The mythological character Phaon.
Phuinis	The Greek Phoinix, friend of Peleus.
Phulsphna	The legendary figure Polyxena.
Prisis	The Greek Briseis mentioned in the Iliad.
Priumne	Priam king of Troy.
Semla	The Greek mortal Semele.
Sispe, Sisphe	The legendary king Sisyphus.
Tages	See Tarchies.
Taitle	The Etruscan form of the mythological figure Daedalus.
Tarchies	Occurs in Pava Tarchies, label of a central figure in depictions of divination, who, along with Epiur, a divinatory child, is believed to be the same as Tages, founder of the Etruscan religion, mentioned by Roman authors.
Tarchon	An Etruscan culture hero who, with his brother, Tyrrhenus, founded the Etruscan Federation of twelve cities.
Techrs	From the Greek Trojan War hero Teucer.
Telmun, Tlamun, Talmun, Tlamu	Telamon, a legendary Argonaut.
Teriasals, Teriasa	Legendary blind prophet Tiresias.
These	A hero who is the equivalent of Theseus.
Thethis	The Greek nymph Thetis, mother of Achilles.
Tuntle	The legendary figure, known to the Greeks as Tyndareus.
Tute	The Greek hero Tydeus.
Tyrrhenus	An Etruscan culture hero and twin brother of Tarchon.
Umaele	A seer, associated with Alpunea (see above), with no clear connection with any known Latin or Greek figure. He carries a bag with a head in it that tells him prophesies, and is also seen on mirrors with one knee up and left arm extended apparently examining a liver for prophesy, that is haruspex.
Urphe	The mythological figure Orpheus.
Urusthe	The homeric legendary character Orestes.
Uthste	The legendary hero Odysseus
Velparun	The Greek hero Elpenor.
Vikare	Son of Taitle, the mythological figure of Icarus. The name is found inscribed once, on a golden bulla dating to the 5th century BCE now housed at the Walters Art Museum.
Vile, Vilae	Greek Iolaos, nephew of Hercle.

== See also ==
- Etruscan mythology
- List of Etruscan names for Greek heroes
- Interpretatio graeca
