= Orcus =

Roman god of the underworld

- God of the underworld
- Member of the di selecti
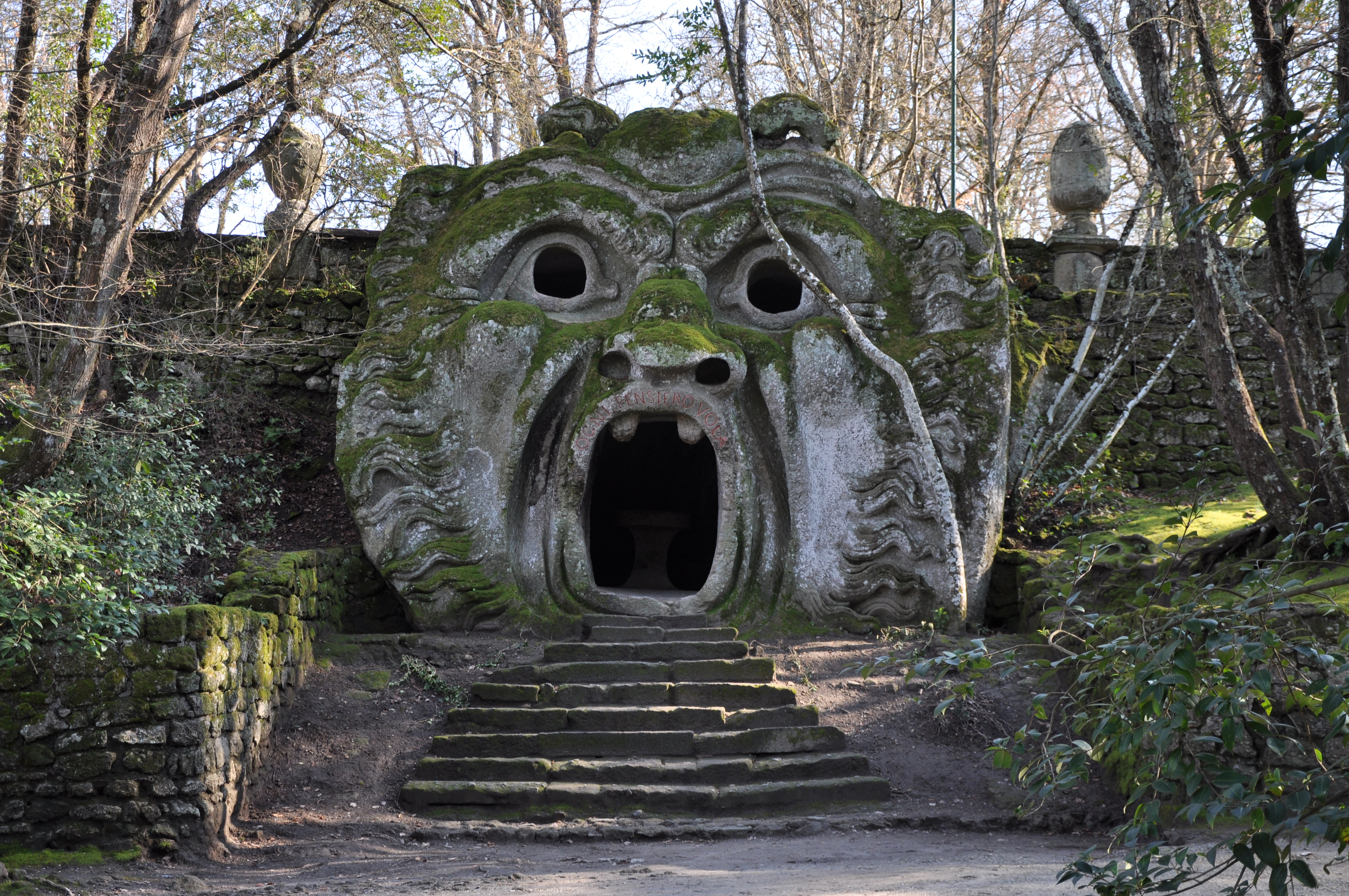
- Orcus Mouth, a 16th-century folly in the Gardens of Bomarzo
- Other names: Dis Pater, Hades (Pluto) (Note: The conflation of Orcus with Dis Pater and Hades causes some consternation, since they are thought to originally have been separate. Pluto is especially bothersome, since he was originally a god of wealth, later merged with Hades, who in turn was confounded with Dis Pater and Orcus. Confusion with the similar-sounding Greek Horkos is yet another issue to trouble mythographic splitters.)
- Abode: Hades, Underworld
- Gender: Male

Equivalents
- Etruscan: Orcus
- Greek: Horkos, Hades

Orcus was a god of the underworld in Roman mythology. As with Hades, the name of the god was also used for the underworld itself. His origins are disputed: some scholars regard him as a native Roman underworld deity, others as derived from Etruscan or Greek tradition, his name being borrowed from the near-homophone Horkos (Ancient Greek: ὅρκος, "oath"), the son of Eris who punished broken oaths, an association that led ancient scholars to describe Orcus himself as a punisher of perjurers. In time his figure merged with those of Dis Pater and Pluto.

== Origins ==
Richard Peter, in Roscher's mythological lexicon, regarded him as the native underworld god of Roman religion, connecting the name with the root of Latin arcere ("to shut in"); Wissowa held that even Orcus was not an Italic creation, comparing Virgil's "pale Orcus" joined with the Furies on the fifth day of the month with the birth of Horkos on that same day, likewise attended by the Furies, in Hesiod. The ancients explained the name variously: Verrius Flaccus derived it from urgere ("to press hard"), the god having anciently been called Urgus, "because he presses upon us more than any other".

=== Orcus and Horkos ===
The similarity between Latin Orcus and Greek Ὅρκος (Horkos), the personified Oath, was noticed in antiquity and has been explained in opposite directions ever since. In Hesiod, Horkos is the son of Eris, borne "as a bane to those who swear false oaths", and the Erinyes attend his birth on the fifth day of the month; in the corresponding passage of the Georgics Virgil makes the fifth day the birthday of "pale Orcus and the Eumenides" (quintam fuge: pallidus Orcus / Eumenidesque satae). Wissowa took this correspondence as proof that the Latin name was itself taken over from the Greek, Horkos being understood as an epithet of the god of the underworld. The same parallel is the subject of a chapter of Rudolf Hirzel's Der Eid, which argued conversely that the original sense of ὅρκος was the god of death (the Orcus of the Latins) and that the oath was in origin sworn by him; Hirzel also observed that Virgil's lines are not a mere rendering of Hesiod's and must go back to a further, probably Hellenistic, Greek model.

Ancient scholarship drew the connection in the opposite direction, making Orcus a god of oaths. The interpolated Servius on Georgics 1.277 attributes to Celsus the explanation that he is "the god of the oath, called pale because those who swear grow pale with trembling: for in Orcus the souls of the dead are said to swear that they will not help against the Fates those of their own whom they have left behind in life", and the second Vatican Mythographer likewise derives the name "as it were from swearing, lest anyone should go unpunished". Peter dismissed this as a "foolish" explanation, but suggested that it may be connected with the aspirated spelling Horcus, which Servius's commentary on Donatus ascribes to "the ancients" and which is attested in an inscription and in manuscripts of Plautus, Terence and Virgil, as well as in the legal term horcinus in Ulpian; Probus similarly recorded that the ancients wrote Orchus.

=== Orcus and the Etruscan world ===
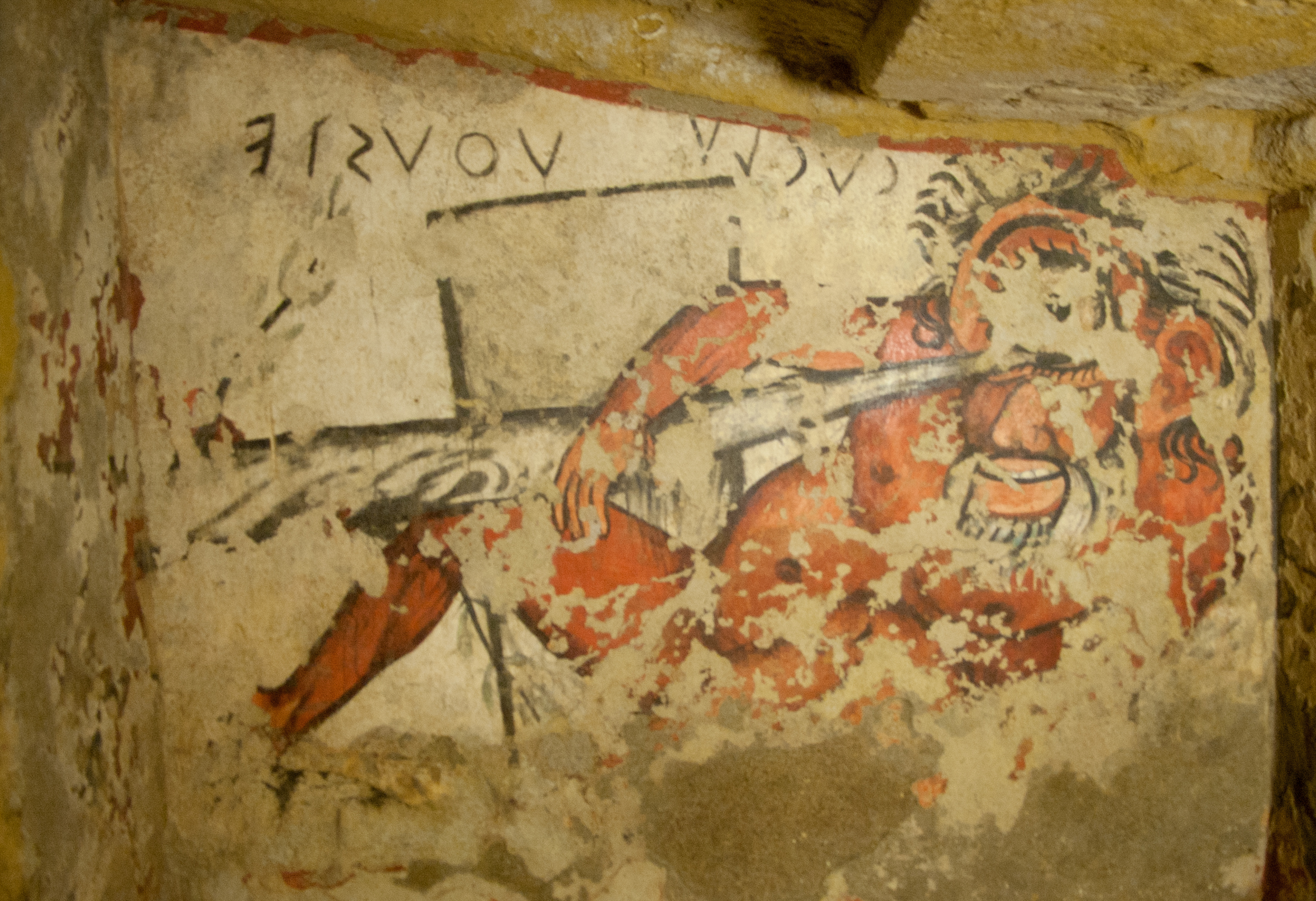
Fresco of Odysseus (Etruscan: Uθuste) and the Cyclops (Etruscan: Cuclu) in the Tomb of Orcus, Tarquinia, Italy.

An Etruscan origin has been canvassed and found wanting: examining the question, Wilhelm Deecke concluded that the Roman Orcus offers "hardly any support" for such a derivation, since Orcus beside orca, arcus, arca and arcere has a sound Latin etymology, the form Uragus seems to have been invented only for the sake of the derivation from urgere, and a stem arc- or orc- survives in Etruscan "only in uncertain traces". Peter likewise connected the name with the root of arcere ("to shut in"), while the standard etymological dictionary of Latin records it simply as being of unknown etymology.

The Roman conception of the afterlife took shape in close contact with that of the Etruscans, from whom Roman religion absorbed much in the archaic period; it is in the Roman-Etruscan tradition, according to Wolfgang Fauth, that the image of the underworld as a devouring maw is rooted. The Etruscan god of the underworld proper was Mantus: "in the Etruscan tongue they call Dis Pater Mantus", notes Servius. Of the demons in his train, Charun, armed with a hammer, is the one whom late glossaries identify outright with Orcus, just as the senators enrolled by Caesar's will, the Orcini, were nicknamed "Charonites"; another, Tuchulcha, is frescoed in the Tomb of Orcus at Tarquinia, opened in 1869.

=== Identification with Pluto and Dis Pater ===
From the earliest literary period Orcus was identified with the Greek god of the Underworld: the Euhemerus of Ennius states that "Pluto is in Latin Dis pater; others call him Orcus". Varro counted him among the di selecti, attributed to him the rape of Proserpina and made him brother of Jupiter and Neptune, transferring to him the genealogy of Pluto; Augustine summed the doctrine up as "Dis pater, that is Orcus", and in poetry and funerary inscriptions the three names became equivalent.

== Cult ==
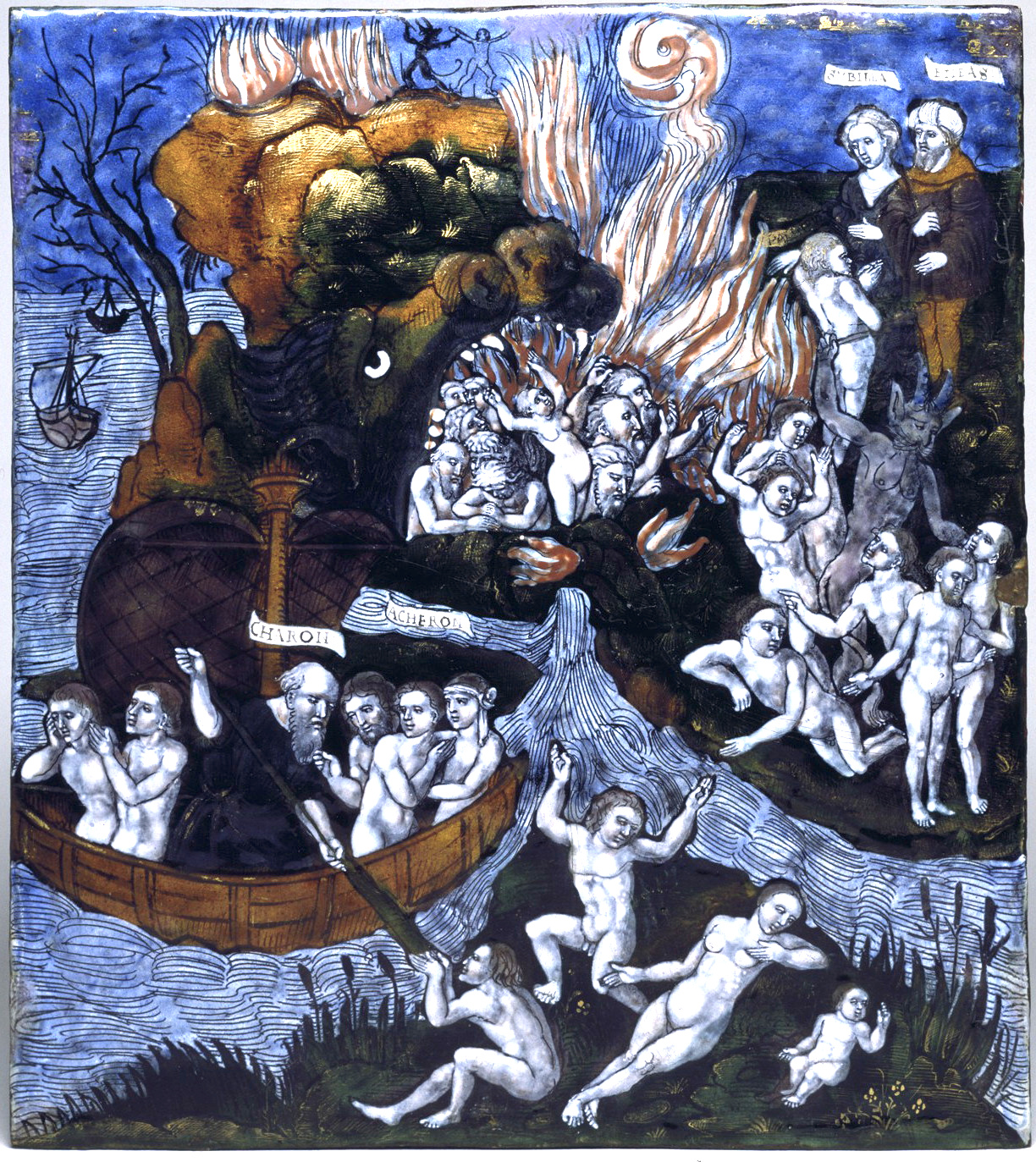
The Descent of Aeneas in the Underworld (c. 1530–1540), Walters Art Museum.

Few Roman divine names are as common in Latin as that of Orcus, which was at home on the archaic stage, in legal language and in everyday proverb. To this currency of the name, however, there corresponds almost no evidence that the god ever received worship.

=== Familiarity of the name ===
In the Rome of the middle Republic, Orcus was an entirely familiar figure, his name recurring in archaic drama as a concrete synonym for death: Plautus's characters take their leave with "we shall meet at Orcus", and for Ennius it is "the heavy onslaught of Orcus" that strikes a man down. The same familiarity marks legal and proverbial usage: an orcinus libertus was a freedman manumitted by will, receiving his freedom "from Orcus", that is after his master's death, while cum Orco rationem habere ("to settle accounts with Orcus") was proverbial for facing death.

In poetry Orcus is the god who actually executes death: the "pale Orcus" of the Georgics, the "Orcus who reaps great things together with small" in Horace, the "livid Orcus" of Tibullus. In this trait scholars have seen the difference from Dis Pater, conceived rather as the prince of the underworld: the name seems to have referred specifically to its malicious and punishing side, the god who tormented evildoers; in the charitable interpretation, the place itself was an abode for the purification of souls.

=== Scant traces of cult ===
For all the popularity of the name there is scarcely any trace of cult: votive dedications are extremely rare, and in an epitaph from Naples the formula Orco peregrino indicates not a cult but that the deceased died far from home. Festus preserves an ancient epithet, Quietalis, "the god of rest".

Isolated is Servius's notice of a festival celebrated jointly for Orcus and Ceres: the "wedding of Orcus" (Orci nuptiae), a rite of particular severity (the use of wine was nefas, religiously forbidden) which the pontiffs are said to have honoured with their presence, celebrating it "with enormous solemnity" (ingenti sollemnitate). Its antiquity is disputed: Wissowa assigned it to the sacrum anniversarium Cereris, a matronal festival of wholly Greek character introduced shortly before the Second Punic War, and W. Warde Fowler, against Frazer's reading of it as an ancient Roman hieros gamos, saw in it "simply the Greek marriage of Pluto and Proserpine".

The temple of Orcus (aedes Orci) said to have stood on the Palatine Hill in Rome is mentioned only in the Historia Augusta and is regarded as apocryphal.

== The jaws of Orcus ==
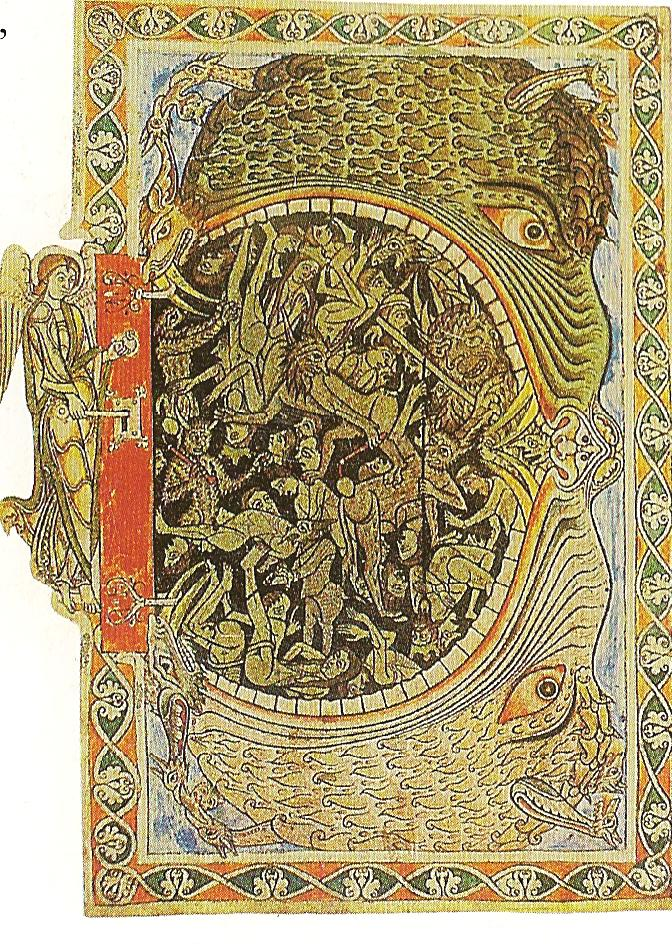
The jaws of Hell. Miniature from the Winchester Psalter, c. 1121–1161, British Library

A characteristic feature of the imagery attached to Orcus is the representation of the underworld as a devouring mouth: for the ancients the stone that closed the mundus was "the door of Orcus, through which the souls of the infernal ones rise to the living", Plautus calls an ill-omened house a "door of Orcus" (ianua Orci), and Virgil places the monsters of the underworld "in the first jaws of Orcus" (primisque in faucibus Orci), an image taken up by Lucretius, Apuleius and Arnobius.

== Persistence and later usage ==
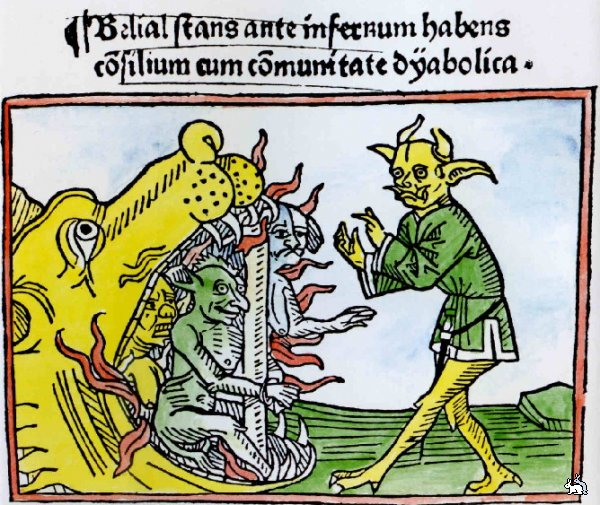
Illustration from Jacobus de Teramo's Trial of Belial (1382), in an edition published in Augsburg in 1473, depicting the demon Belial consulting his companions at the Hellmouth

The survival of the name in the romance and Germanic Middle Ages was noted by scholars from Jacob Grimm onwards. According to the art historian Richard Bernheimer, Orcus was chiefly worshipped in rural areas and had no official cult in the cities; this remoteness would have allowed him to survive long after the more prevalent gods had ceased to be worshipped, aspects of his worship being transmuted into the wild man festivals held in rural Europe into the modern era.

From Orcus's association with death and the underworld, his name came to be used for demons and other underworld monsters, particularly in Italian, where orco refers to a kind of man-eating monster of fairy-tales. A fuller description appears in Matteo Maria Boiardo's Orlando Innamorato, where the orco is a hideous tusked creature dripping with the blood of its victims. The French ogre, first attested in Charles Perrault's tales of 1697, is generally referred to the same Latin word.

=== Ariosto ===
An early example of an orco appears in Ludovico Ariosto's Orlando Furioso (1516), as a bestial, blind, tusk-faced monster inspired by the Cyclops of the Odyssey. (Note: The blind orco monster should not be confused with the other monster orca, a sea-monster which also appears in Ariosto and was later used as a genus-name for “killer whales” (orca).)

=== Tolkien ===
Tolkien took the name of his orcs from the Old English word orc, "evil spirit or bogey", which appears in Beowulf as orcnēas among the brood of Cain to which Grendel belongs; he doubted, however, that it was connected with the Latin. In one manuscript he noted:

The word used in translation of Q[uenya] urko, S[indarin] orch, is orc. But that is because of the similarity of the ancient English word orc, 'evil spirit or bogey', to the Elvish words. There is possibly no connexion between them. The English word is now generally supposed to be derived from Latin Orcus.

In an unpublished letter sent to Gene Wolfe, Tolkien also made this comment:

Orc I derived from Anglo-Saxon, a word meaning demon, usually supposed to be derived from the Latin Orcus – Hell. But I doubt this, though the matter is too involved to set out here.

From this use, countless other fantasy games and works of fiction have borrowed the concept of the orc.

=== Other modern-era use ===
- The Kuiper belt dwarf planet Orcus is named after Orcus. This is because Orcus was sometimes considered to be another name for Pluto, and also because Pluto and Orcus are both plutinos. Orcus has one known moon, Vanth.

== See also ==
- Demogorgon

== Other sources not cited ==
- Grimal, P. (1986). The Dictionary of Classical Mythology. Oxford, UK: Basil Blackwell. p. 328.
- Mackauer, W. (1939). "Orcus". Paulys Realencyclopädie der classischen Altertumswissenschaft (in German). vol. XVIII.1, coll. 908–928.
- Richardson, L. (1992). A New Topographical Dictionary of Ancient Rome. Baltimore, MD / London, UK: The Johns Hopkins University Press. p. 278.
