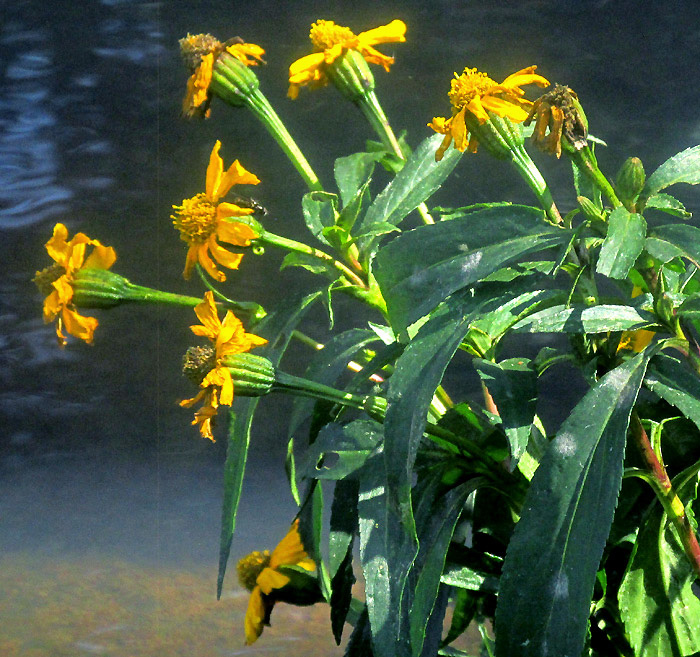
- Tagetes persicifolia leafy, flowering stem

Scientific classification
- Kingdom: Plantae
- Clade: Embryophytes
- Clade: Tracheophytes
- Clade: Spermatophytes
- Clade: Angiosperms
- Clade: Eudicots
- Clade: Asterids
- Order: Asterales
- Family: Asteraceae
- Genus: Tagetes
- Species: T. persicifolia

Binomial name
- Tagetes persicifolia (Benth.) B.L.Turner

Synonyms
- Adenopappus persicifolius Benth.

= Tagetes persicifolia =

Species of plant

Tagetes persicifolia, with no English name, is a species of shrub native only to Mexico. It belongs to the family Asteraceae.

== Description ==
These features help distinguish Tagetes persicifolia from many other Aster Family species with yellow flowers:

- It is a herbaceous shrub or subshrub which is a perennial up to 2 m (6 ft 6 1/2 in) tall, with one to a few branching stems rising from the base.
- Leaves up to 16 cm (6.3 in) long and 2 cm (3/4 in) wide arise opposite one another on stems. Blades are hairless but covered with minute glands. Blade margins are finely toothed, and blade bases unite forming a tube around the stem up to 18 mm (3/4 in) long.
- Floral heads arise singly at branch tips and where leaves connect to the stems. Up to 15 "ray florets" along the head's margin have flat, petal-like, yellow corollas up to 15 mm (5/8 in) long. These radiate from around the head's "eye," which consists of up to about 50 "disc florets" with yellow, cylindrical corollas. No scale-like bracts, or "paleae" appear among the floret bases. Below floral heads, about 15 slender involucral bracts arranged in a single row have their sides fused together and bear oil-containing glands.
- Slender, one-seeded, cypsela-type fruits up to 8 mm (5/16 in) long are topped by pappuses reduced to a crown of 5 projections only up to 0.4 mm (1/32 in) high.

== Distribution ==
Tagetes persicifolia in endemic only to the Mexican states of Colima, Durango, Guanajuato, Hidalgo, Jalisco, México, Michoacán, Nayarit, Oaxaca and Querétaro.

== Habitat ==
Tagetes persicifolia occurs along banks of streams, rivers and irrigation canals, as well as in cultivated fields and gardens, at an elevation of 1,700–2,400 m (5,600–7,900 ft).

== Taxonomy ==
In 1840 when George Bentham formally described Tagetes persicifolia under the name of Adenopappus persicifolius, apparently because he considered the species' very low, crownlike pappus to be a circle of glands atop the cypsela and not a real pappus, he erected the genus Adenopappus to accommodate it; The Adeno- in the name derives from the Greek adḗn, meaning "gland." Now Adenopappus is considered synonymous with Tagetes.

In the description of the new taxon, it is noted that the type specimen had been collected along the banks of a river at Maravatío -- ... ad margines fluviorum, Maravateo. The collector had been Karl Theodor Hartweg.

=== Phylogeny ===
Phylogenetic analysis of sequences of internal transcribed spacers found Tagetes persicifolia to belong to a strongly-supported "Lucida clade", in which T. persicifolia is sister to the other members of the clade tested, which were Tagetes lucida, Tagetes pringlei, Tagetes filifolia and Tagetes micrantha. Members of this clade are common in wet soils and mostly have a sweet, anise-like aroma.

== Etymology ==
The origin of the genus name Tagetes is unknown, though it may honor Tages, supposed to be a founding prophet of the Etruscan religion.

The species name persicifolia begins with a form of the Latin Persicus, which means "Persian," as reflected in the scientific name for peach trees. Peach trees are Prunus persica, suggesting a Persian origin, because Europeans such as Linnaeus, who formally named the species (as Amygdalus persica), thought that peach trees originated in Persia. However, they are from China. The -folia in the species name is from the Latin folium, mean "leaf."

Therefore, if an English name for Tagetes persicifolia were to be coined, surely it would be "Peach-leafed Marigold."

== Gallery ==
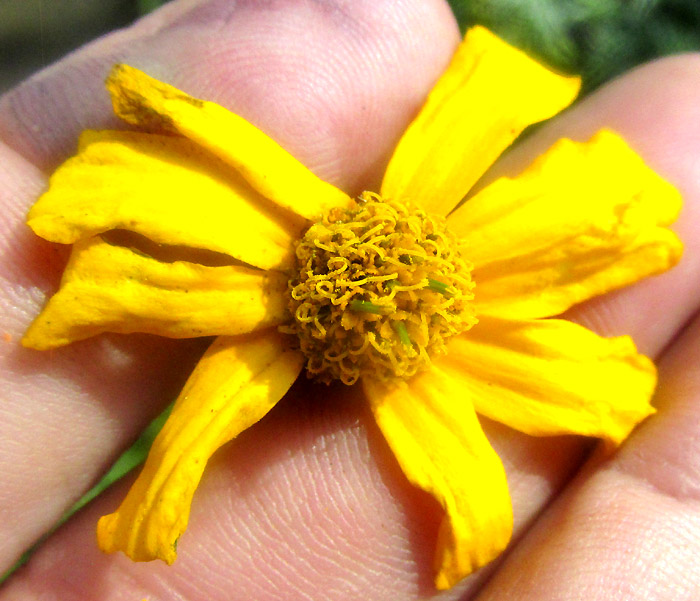
Flowering head

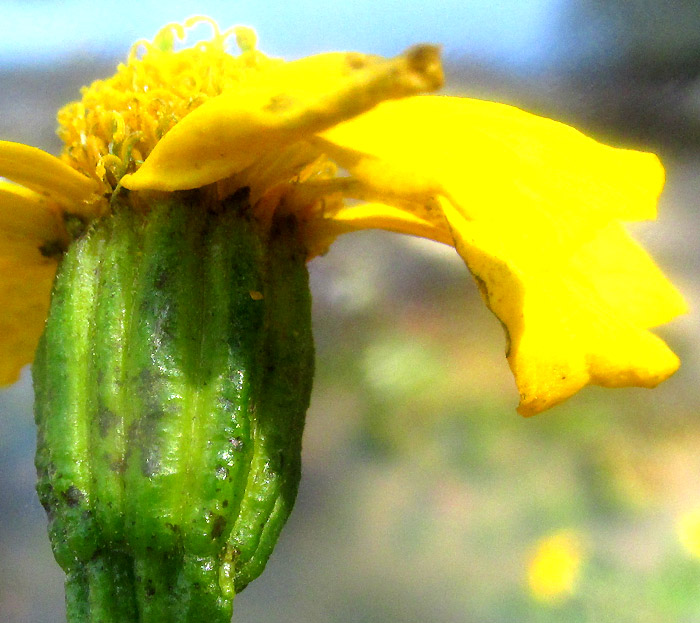
Involucral bracts with glands and fused margins

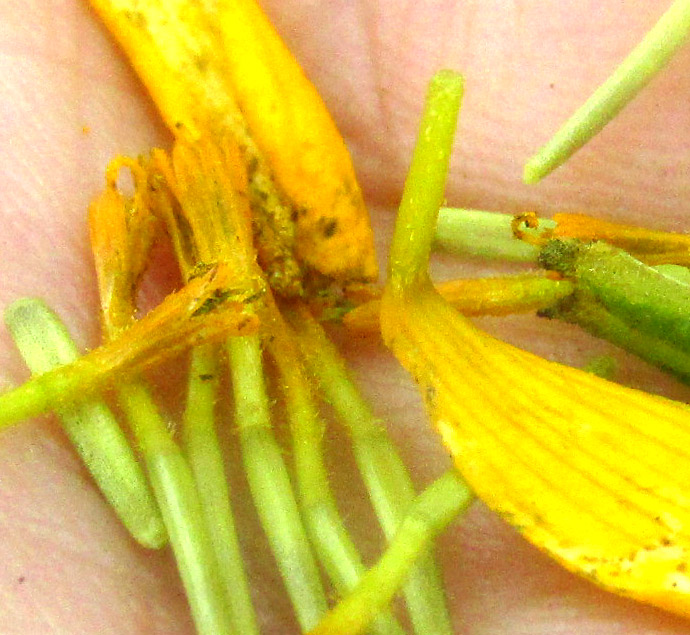
Florets dissected from head

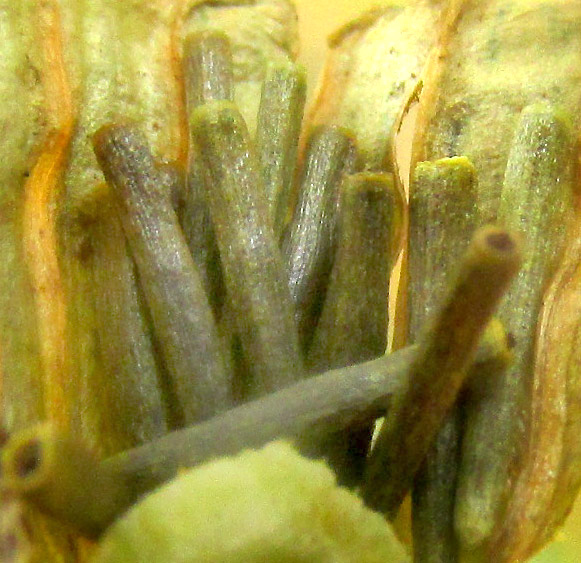
Cypselae with much reduced pappuses

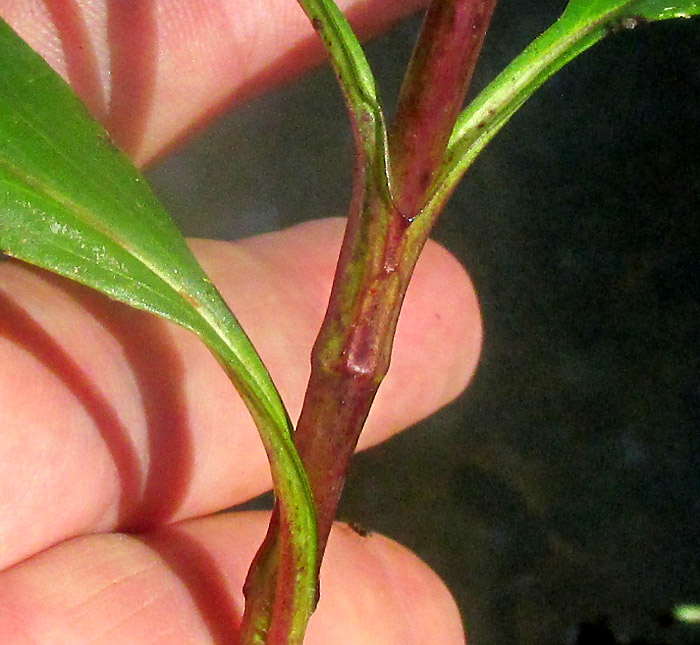
Leaf bases forming tube around stem

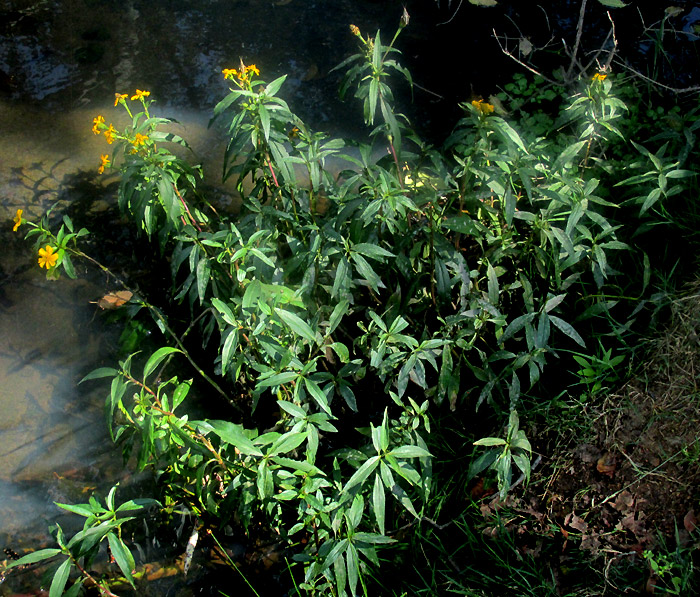
Plant in habitat beside stream
