= List of Etruscan names for Greek heroes =

This is a list of Etruscan names for Greek heroes. It is a partial list of the names in the list of Etruscan mythological figures.

== Names ==
Greek name	Etruscan name	Notes
Achilles	Achle, Achile	Legendary hero of the Trojan War
Actaeon	Ataiun	
Admetus	Atmite	
Adonis	Atunis	
Agamemnon	Achmemrun	Legendary king of Mycenaean Greece
Aitolos	Etule	Confused with his brother, Epeios, who built the Trojan horse
Ajax, son of Telamon; Ajax, son of Oileus	Aivas Tlamunus, Aivas Vilates	also Eivas or Evas
Amphiaraus	Hamphiare, Amphare	Legendary seer
Amycus	Amuce, Amuche, Amuke	The Greek legendary figure of the Argonauts myth
Asklepios	Esplace	Legendary healer
Atlas	Aril	
Capaneus	Capne, Kapne	
Castor	Castur	
Daidalos	Taitle	
Dios Kouroi ("sons of Zeus")	Tinas cliniar, "sons of Tina"	Designating the twins
Elpenor	Velparun	
Eteocles	Evtucle, [Ev]thucle	
Herakles	Hercle, Hercele, Herecele, Herkle, Hrcle	
Icarus	Vikare	Son of Taitle
Iolaos	Vile, Vilae	Nephew of Hercle
Jason	Easun, Heasun, Heiasun	
Kallinikos	Calanice	Greek name of Hercle
Lynceus	Lunc, Lnche	
Meleager	Meleacr	
Menelaus	Menle	The hero of Trojan War fame
Nestor	Nestur	
Odysseus	Uthste	
Orpheus	Urphe	
Orestes	Urusthe	The Homeric legendary character
Palamedes	Palmithe, Talmithe	
Patroclus	Patrucle	
Peleus	Pele	
Perseus	Perse, Pherse	
Phaon	Phaun, Faun, Phamu	
Phoinix	Phuinis	The friend of Peleus
Prometheus	Prumathe	
Polydeuces (Pollux)	Pultuce, Pulutuce, Pulutuke, Pultuke	One of the mythological twins
Rhadamanthys	Rathmtr	the Greek mythological character, judge of the dead.
Sisyphus	Sispe, Sisphe	The legendary king
Telamon	Telmun, Tlamun, Talmun, Tlamu	A legendary Argonaut
Teucer	Techrs	The Trojan War hero
Theseus	These	
Tiresias	Teriasals, Teriasa	Legendary blind prophet
Tyndareus	Tuntle	
Tydeus	Tute	

== See also ==
- List of Etruscan mythological figures
- List of Greek deities
