= Alpanu =

Etruscan goddess of the love and beauty

Alpan
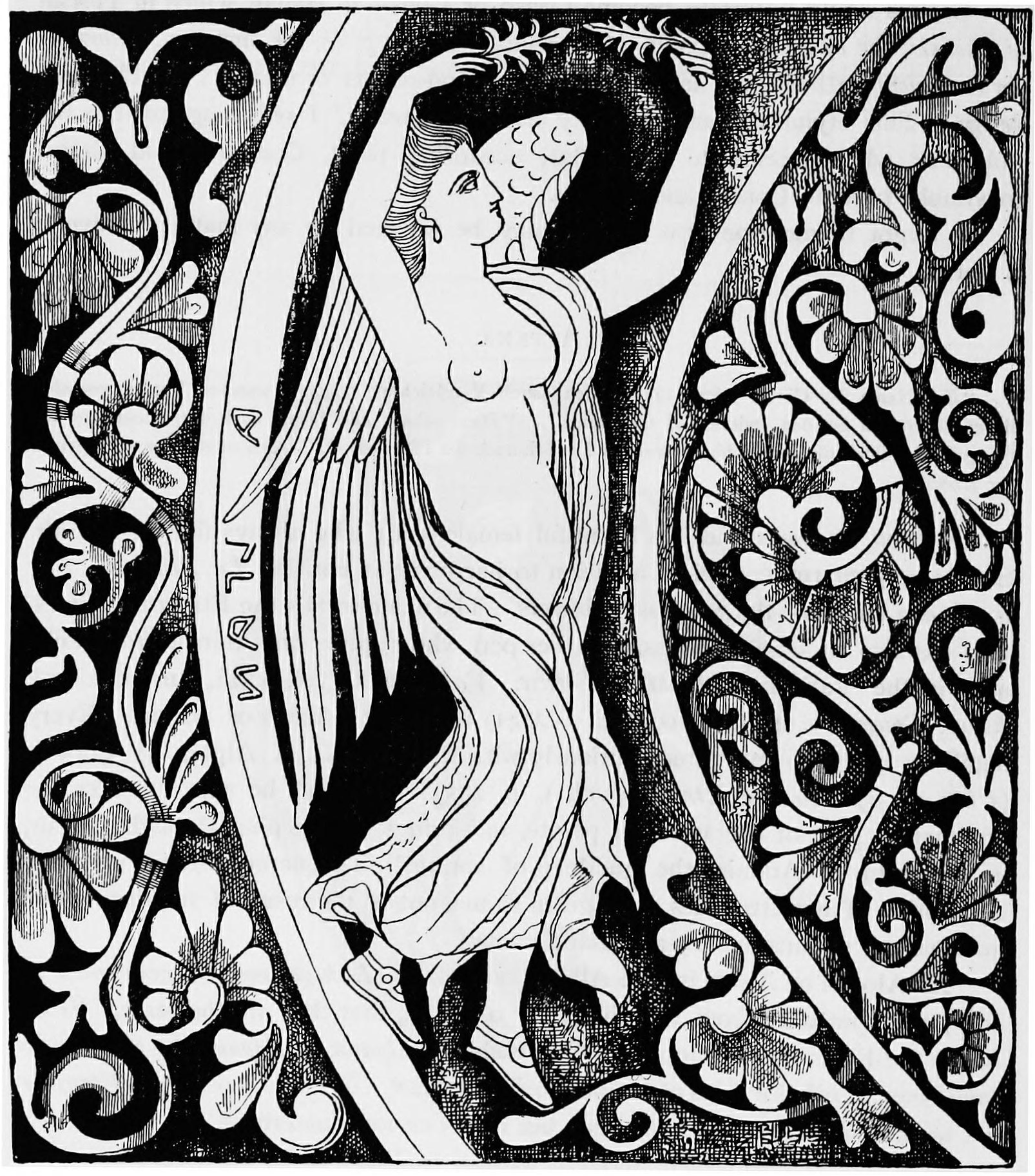
- Design depicting Alpan found on a vase.
- Other names: Alpnu; Alpena; Alpanu
- Etruscan: 𐌀𐌋𐌐𐌀𐌍
- Gender: Variable, usually female
- Associated deities: Turan; Adonis
- Consorts: possibly Thanr and Achvizr

Equivalents
- Roman: Venus

Alpanu, (other names include Alpnu, Alpan, and Alpena; shortened as Alp) was an Etruscan goddess of love, friendship, springtime, and possibly the underworld.

Her name appears in its shortened form on the Piacenza Liver, and it appears on seven mirrors mainly in love scenes as well. The personification of Alpan is shown in one of the mirrors as male. She is shown as wearing jewellery, a loose cloak, and sandals. Alpan is frequently depicted holding leaves and flowers, and is often shown alongside the love goddess Turan. She is often depicted alongside embracing couples. She has been shown in embrace with the deities Thanr and Achvizr.

Alpan is said to be a goddess of flowers, creating beautiful plant life in the wake of Adonis during springtime. She is also described as both the personification and goddess of generosity and gladness, with the meaning of her name being "willing, gladness". Alpan is considered to be a member of the Lasas.

Some scholars believe Alpanu to be a separate goddess from the one known Alpan or Alpena, with Alpena being the goddess of springtime while Alpanu is "an inferior form of Venus". In this case, it is believed that Alpanu split off from Alpena.

== See also ==
- List of Etruscan mythological figures
