= Tomb of Orcus =

Etruscan hypogeum (burial chamber) in Tarquinia, Italy

Coordinates: 42°14′48″N 11°46′48″E

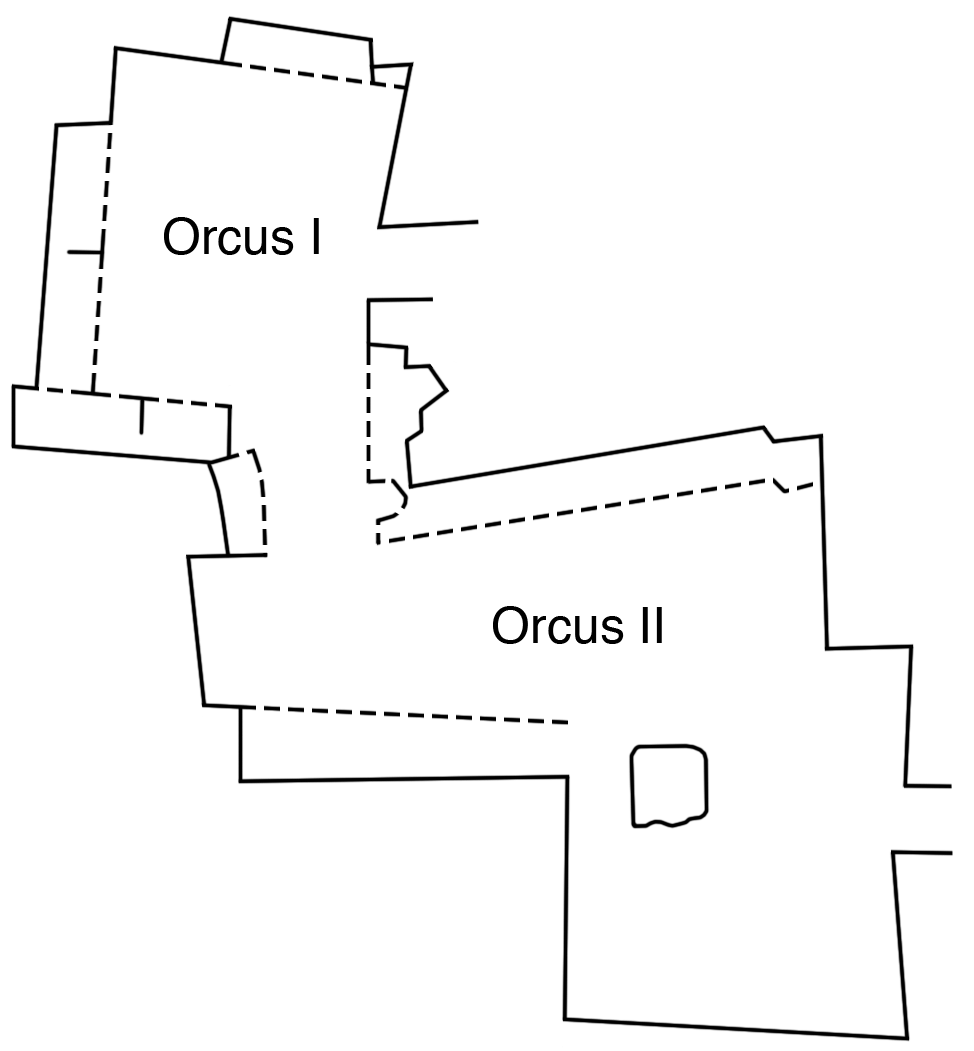
A diagram of the Tomb of Orcus, showing the two chambers and two dromes (entrances).

The Tomb of Orcus (Italian: Tomba dell'Orco), sometimes called the Tomb of Murina (Italian: Tomba dei Murina), is a 4th-century BC Etruscan hypogeum (burial chamber) in Tarquinia, Italy. Discovered in 1868, it displays Hellenistic influences in its remarkable murals, which include the portrait of Velia Velcha, an Etruscan noblewoman, and the only known pictorial representation of the daemon Tuchulcha. In general, the murals are noted for their depiction of death, evil, and unhappiness.

Because the tomb was built in two sections at two stages, it is sometimes referred to as the Tombs of Orcus I and II; it is believed to have belonged to the Murina family, an offshoot of the Etruscan Spurinnae. The foundation is inscribed with the following inscription:

LARΘIALE HVLΧNIESI MARCESIC CALIAΘESI MVNSLE NACNVAIASI ΘAMCE LE…

== History ==
Orcus I was built between 470 and 450 BC (perhaps by a man named Leive; see below); a separate hypogeum, Orcus II, was built c. 325 BC. At some point in antiquity the wall between the two was removed, creating a large tomb with two dromes (entrances).

The tomb was excavated in 1868 by an officer of the French Army. Upon its discovery, the excavator mistook the painting of a cyclops for the Roman god Orcus (see below), hence the name "Tomb of Orcus". The Italian name (Tomba dell'Orco) can also mean "Tomb of the Ogre", and it is used that way in Italy today.

The second tomb has never been fully excavated.

== Murals ==
Though most of the walls are muraled, the artists did not complete the ceiling. A scientific analysis in 2001 revealed that the paint used contained cinnabar, ochre, orpiment, calcite, copper, and Egyptian blue. While the artwork in Orcus I is highly praised (particularly the painting of Velia Velcha; see below), some of the artwork of Orcus II is considered poorly done.

It is likely that the French excavators of the tomb tried to remove some of the murals for exhibition in the Louvre, which resulted in significant deterioration.

=== Orcus I ===
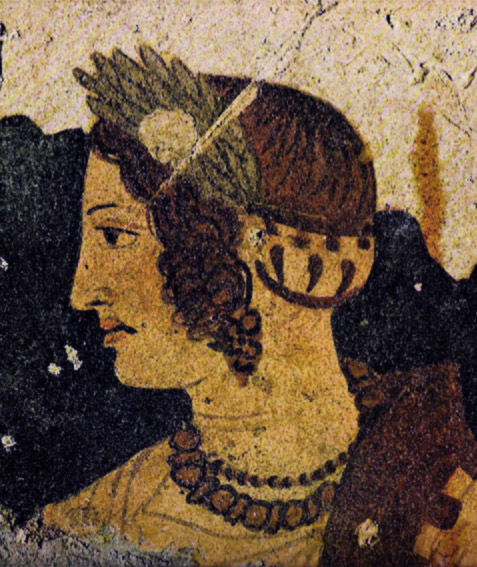
Velia Velcha, as pictured on the right wall of Orcus I.

The Tomb of Orcus I (also known as the Tomb of Velcha) was constructed between 470 and 450 BC. The main and right walls depict a banquet, believed to be the Spurinnae after their death in the Battle of Syracuse. The banqueters are surrounded by demons who serve as cupbearers.

One of the banqueters is a noblewoman named Velia Velcha (or by some interpretations, Velia Spurinna), whose portrait has been called the "Mona Lisa of antiquity". Her realistic profile (especially her eye) bears the influence of Hellenistic art. Unlike the Mona Lisa, however, she is noted for her grimace or sneer.

=== Orcus II ===
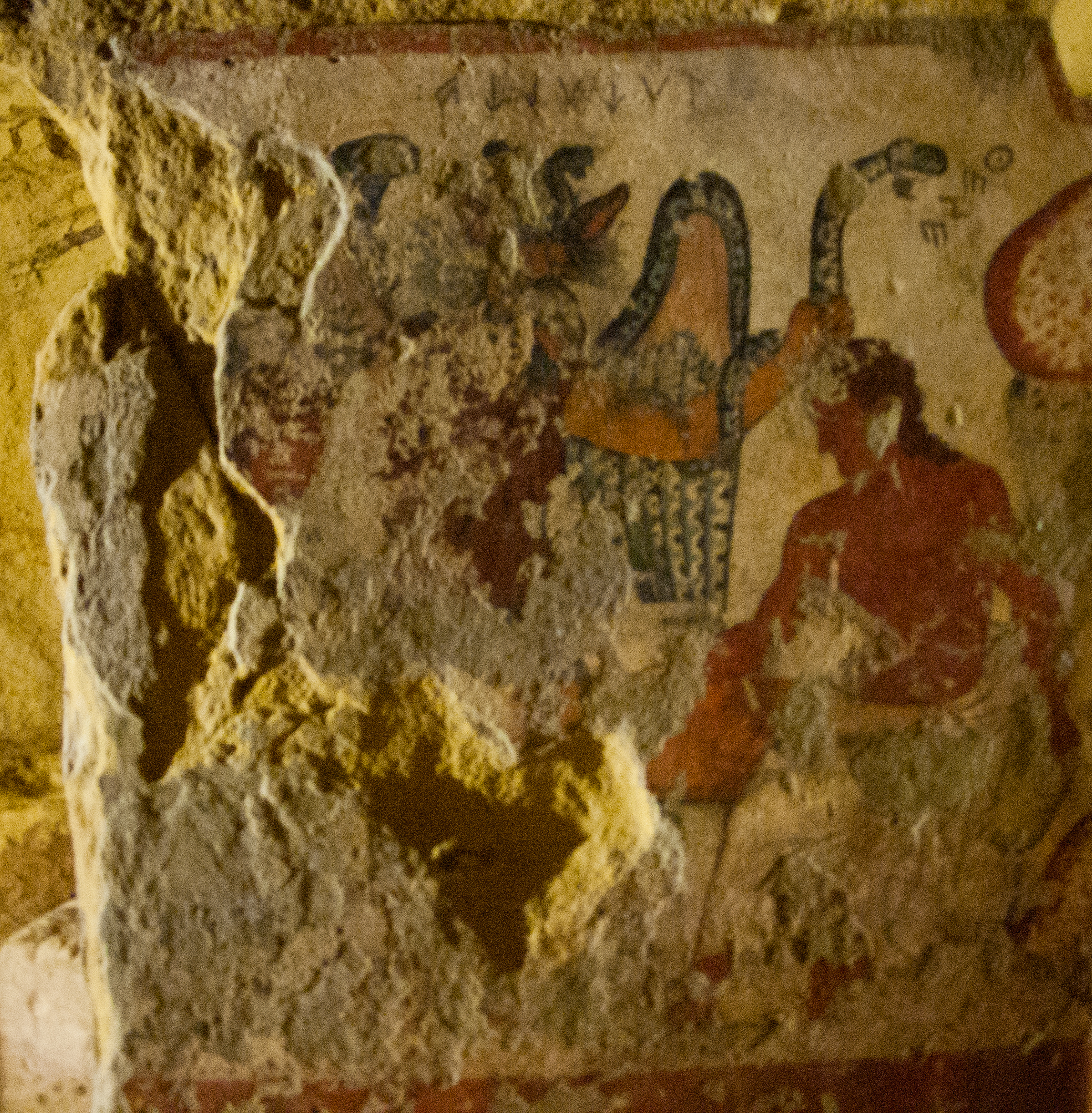
These and Tuchulcha

The Tomb of Orcus II (sometimes distinguished as the Tomb of Orcus) was constructed around 325 BC. Its entrance is guarded by paintings of "Charun" (Charon), the keeper of the underworld, and a cyclops (possibly Polyphemus or Geryon). When the tomb was originally discovered, the cyclops was mistaken for the Roman god of the underworld, Orcus (hence the tomb's name).

The back wall depicts a funeral procession overseen by "Aita" (Hades), the Etruscan god of the underworld, and his wife "Phersipnei" (Persephone). The left wall is believed to depict Agamemnon, Tiresias, and Ajax in the underworld.

"These" (Theseus) and the Etruscan equivalent of Pirithous are seated at a table on the right wall, playing a board game, where they are threatened by the Etruscan demon "Tuchulcha", who is pictured with pointed ears, a hairy face, and a hooked beak, wielding snakes in his hands. The tomb is unique in that it bears the only known historical portrayal of this demon.

== Inscription ==
An inscription in the foundation of the tomb reads as follows:

LARΘIALE HVLΧNIESI MARCESIC CALIAΘESI MVNSLE NACNVAIASI ΘAMCE LE…

Transliterated as:

Larthiale Hulchniesi Marcesi-c Caliathesi munsle nacnvaiasi thamuce Le…

The names "Larthiale Hulchniesi" and "Marcesi[c] Caliathesi" are in the dative case, and thus mean "for/to Larth Hulchnie" and "for/to Marce *Caliathe", respectively; "nacnvaiasi" is also dative, from the Etruscan noun nacnvaia, "those who come next" (i.e., posterity); the noun "mun[i]s[u]le" refers to any underground monument (and not exclusively to tombs); the verb "tham[u]ce" means "established"; the final "Le…" is the start of a new word, and a portion of the next letter is visible, sometimes interpreted as an "i"; the entire name "Leive" has been suggested.

The phrase then may be translated:

Le[ive] erected this monument to Larth Hulchnie and Marce Caliathe for posterity.

Larth Hulchnie is believed to have been the magistrate of Tarquinia in the 4th century BC, and Marce Caliathe is believed to have been his "representative".

Whether the transcription means that Larth Hulchnie and Marce Caliathe were buried in the tomb is debated, especially since they were not members of the Spurinna family; most scholars believe that the monument was simply dedicated to the magistrates. Giuliano and Larissa Bonfante have suggested that the passage is incomplete and would have originally specified "during the magistracy" of Hulchnie and Caliathe (confer zilci Velusi Hulchniesi, "during the magistracy of Velu Hulchnie", found elsewhere in the tomb). According to this interpretation, the phrase would translate:

Le[ive] erected this monument for posterity [during the magistracy] of Larth Hulchnie and Marce Caliathe.

"Marce" is probably a cognate or preform of "Marcus". "Hulchnie" is generally interpreted as the Roman gens "Fulcinius". Some have suggested that Larth Hulchnie means "Hulchnie, son of Larth".
