= Vegoia =

Etruscan mythology's character

Vegoia (Etruscan: Vecu) is a sibyl, prophet, or nymph within the Etruscan religious framework. She is identified as the author of parts of their large and complex set of sacred books, detailing the religiously correct methods of founding cities and shrines, draining fields, formulating laws and ordinances, measuring space and dividing time; she initiated the Etruscan people to the arts, as originating the rules and rituals of land marking, and as presiding over the observance, respect, and preservation of boundaries.

Vegoia also is known as Vecu, Vecui, and Vecuvia, as well as Vegoe; her name is also given as Begoe or Bigois.

== In the Etruscan religious framework ==
The Etruscan religious system remains mostly obscure. There being few bilingual documents comparable to the Rosetta Stone that could facilitate translation, the Etruscan language is poorly understood.

Therefore, the existing ancient Etruscan documents of the eighth, seventh, and sixth centuries BCE that would reveal their religious concepts, do not yield much. Moreover, during the later period of the fifth through the first centuries BCE, Etruscan civilization heavily absorbed elements of Greek civilization and eventually, it was diluted in the Greco-Roman cultural mix with their powerful Roman neighbors. Lastly, while the Etruscans formalized their religious concepts and practices in a series of "sacred books", most no longer exist and they are known only through commentaries or quotes by Roman authors of the late first century, (Note: Dumézil (2000) lists the following Roman authors: Granius Flaccus. De indigitamentis. — dedicated to Caesar; Nigidius Figulus. —?—.; Figulus was a friend of Cicero, exiled by Caesar; his brontoscopic calendar has been handed down inside the works of a certain Lydus.: Herennius. De sacris Saliaribus Tiburtium (lost).; Messala. De auspiciis.; Trebatius. De religionibus.; Veranius. De libri auspiciorum (fragments); and; Veranius. Pontificales quaestiones (fragments); of which only fragments are known.: Marcus Terentius Varro. Antiquitates rerum humanarum et divinarum (lost).; Also, some authors of the late 1st century BCE, originally from Etruria, tried to salvage bits and pieces of their native culture: Tarquitius Priscus. Ostentarium Tuscum; and; Tarquitius Priscus. Ostentarium arborium. Priscus, originally from Tarquinia, was described as a contemporary of Cicero; he is only known through some quotes by Macrobius.: Aulus Caecina Severus. —?—.; A.C. Severus, originally from Volterra, was a friend of Cicero; his works are the basis of lengthy exposés concerning the interpretation of lightning strokes by Seneca and Pliny.: Cornelius Labeo. —?—.; Labeo vaguely identified as living in-between the 1st and 3rd centuries CE.: Marcianus Minneus Felix Capella. —?—.; Capella lived much later, in the 5th century CE).) and hence, may be biased.

Two mythological figures have been set by the Etruscans as presiding over the writing of their sacred books: Vegoia, the subject of this article, and Tages, a monstrous childlike figure gifted with the knowledge and prescience of an ancient sage. Those books are known from Latin authors under a classification pertaining to their content according to their mythological author (whether delivered through speeches or lectures, such as Tages, or inspiration). (Note: Pallottino (1942) summarizes the known (but non-extant) scriptures and invents names for groups of them: the Libri Haruspicini (Tages), are those stating the theory and rules of divination from animal entrails; the Libri Fulgurales (Vegoia), also known as Ars fulguritarum, were about divination from lightning strikes (these were stored in Rome in the Temple of Apollo Palatinus together with the Sibylline Books and the Carmina of the Marcii); and; the Libri Rituales (Vegoia, parts), which he subdivides into; the Libri Fatales (Vegoia), which expressed the correct religious methods of founding cities and shrines, draining fields, formulating laws and ordinances, measuring space and dividing time; the Libri Acherontici (Tages), which dealt with the hereafter; and; the Libri Ostentaria, which contained rules for interpreting prodigies.; The revelations of the prophet Tages formed a corpus Pallottino calls: the Libri Tagetici, which included; the Libri Haruspicini and; the Libri Acherontici.; The revelations of the prophetess Vegoia were given in: the Libri Vegoici, which Pallottino subdivides into; the Libri Fulgurales and; parts of the Libri Rituales, especially one of its sub-subgroups; the Libri Fatales.)

== The attributes of Vegoia ==
The figure of Vegoia is almost entirely blurred in the mists of the past. She is known mostly from the traditions of the Etruscan city of Chiusi (Latin: Clusium; Etruscan: Clevsin; Umbrian: Camars) (now in the province of Siena). The revelations of the prophetess Vegoia are designated as the Libri Vegoici that included the Libri Fulgurales and part of the Libri Rituales, especially the Libri Fatales.

She is barely designated as a "nymph" and as the author of the Libri Fulgurales, that give the keys to interpreting the meaning of lightning strokes sent by the deities using a cartography of the sky that, as a sort of property division and use assignment, is attributed to Vegoia. Her assignment of sectors of the horizon to various deities is paralleled in the microcosm that is interpreted using the liver of a sacrificed animal. The sacred divisions also seem to have a correspondence in the measurement and division of land that, since the very dawn of Etruscan history, obeyed religious rules. Her dictates taught the correct methods of measuring space. (Note: She teaches a certain Arrunti Veltimno and in the Libri Rituales, she stipulated other rules in the Arruns Veltymnus.)

Vegoia also was depicted as lording over the observation of these rules, to be upheld under threat of dire woe or malediction. Thus, she was established as the power presiding over land property and land property rights, laws, and contracts (as distinct from commercial contract laws).

She also is indicated as having established the laws relative to hydraulic works, thus having a special relationship to "tamed" water.

== Influence of Etruscan sacred books ==
This imposing system of "revealing" and "sacred texts" left a significant imprint on the neighboring Italic peoples. There is ample evidence of the Etruscan culture having heavily permeated the less-advanced communities of their Latin and Sabine neighbours. For example, the Etruscan alphabet that was derived from the Greek one, is solidly established as having inspired the Latin alphabet. The principles and structural rules of the Etruscan decimal numeral system, likewise, are recognized as the origin of the Roman numerals that are a simplified version of the Etruscan system. Similarly derived are the symbols of supreme power (see Etruscan civilization), the structure of the Roman calendar, (Note: The Etruscan word itis or itus for the Etruscan notion for the middle of the lunar month, is the source of the Roman ides; the Etruscan word Kalendae (calendar) is the source of Roman calendae, the first day of the month.) and the Etruscan Craeci is the source for the word "Greeks" (who self-identified as Hellenes), etc.

=== Relationship to Sibylline books ===
While the Roman religion has precious little written basis, they nonetheless had a very abstruse set of texts known as the Sibylline Books that were under the exclusive control of special religious figures, the duumviri (then decemviri). The books were resorted to solely in times of ultimate crisis. The devolution of these "sacred books" to the Romans through a rocambolesque scene, was attributed to an Etruscan, Tarquinius Superbus, the last of the legendary kings of Rome. Hence, their relationship to Vegoia.

== Relationship to Egeria ==
Likewise, one may suspect that the legend of Egeria is related to Vegoia. Egeria is the name of the nymph who inspired the second legendary king of Rome, Numa Pompilius (in Latin, "numen" designates "the expressed will of a deity"), who succeeded its founder, Romulus, when she dictated to him the rules that established the original framework of laws and rituals of Rome that also are associated with "sacred books".

Numa is reputed to have written down the teachings of Egeria in "sacred books" that he caused to be buried with him. According to Plutarch, when a chance accident brought them back to light some 500 years later, the books were deemed by the Roman Senate to be inappropriate for disclosure to the people and they ordered that the books be destroyed. What made these sacred books 'inappropriate' was certainly of a "political" nature, but precisely what that was, had not been handed down by Valerius Antias, the source that Plutarch was using. However, sacred books were the source used to interpret the abstruse omens of deities (episode of the omen from Faunus). Sacred books also were associated with beneficial water, which also would have been linked to Vegoia.

== See also ==
- List of Etruscan mythological figures

== Bibliography ==
- Dumézil, Georges (2000) [1974]. "appendice sur la religion des Etrusques". La religion romaine archaïque [The Archaic Roman Religion] (in French). Bibliothèque historique Payot. ISBN 2-228-89297-1 – via Google Books.
- Jannot, Jean-René (2005) [1998]. Religion in Ancient Etruria. Translated by Whitehead, Jane K. University of Wisconsin Press. ISBN 978-0-299-20844-8.
  French original:
  Jannot, Jean-René (1998). Devins, Dieux, et Démons [Diviners, Gods, and Demons] (in French). Picard.
