= Tarchon =

Character in Etruscan mythology

Tarchon was a culture hero of Etruscan mythology who co-founded the Etruscan dodecapolis along with his brother Tyrrhenus. He appears in literature such as Virgil's Aeneid, where he is described as King of the Tyrrhenians. In the poem, he leads the Etruscans in their alliance with Aeneas against Turnus and the other Latin tribes. The later Byzantine writer John the Lydian distinguishes two legendary people by this name. In his version of the myth, Tarchon the Elder received the Etrusca Disciplina from the prophet Tages while Tarchon the Younger fought with Aeneas after his arrival in Italy.

The English spelling Tarchon comes from the Greek Τάρχων, or Τάρκων which itself is thought to reflect tarχun in the Etruscan language. The name is thought to be related to the Latin Tarquinius, the name of a Roman gens, and of the Tarquins, two of the legendary Seven Kings of Rome. The Hittitologist Oliver Gurney proposed that the name could be related to the name of the Luwian storm god Tarhunt, though this connection has been dismissed by other researchers such as Carlo De Simone.
