= Charun =

Etruscan mythological figure

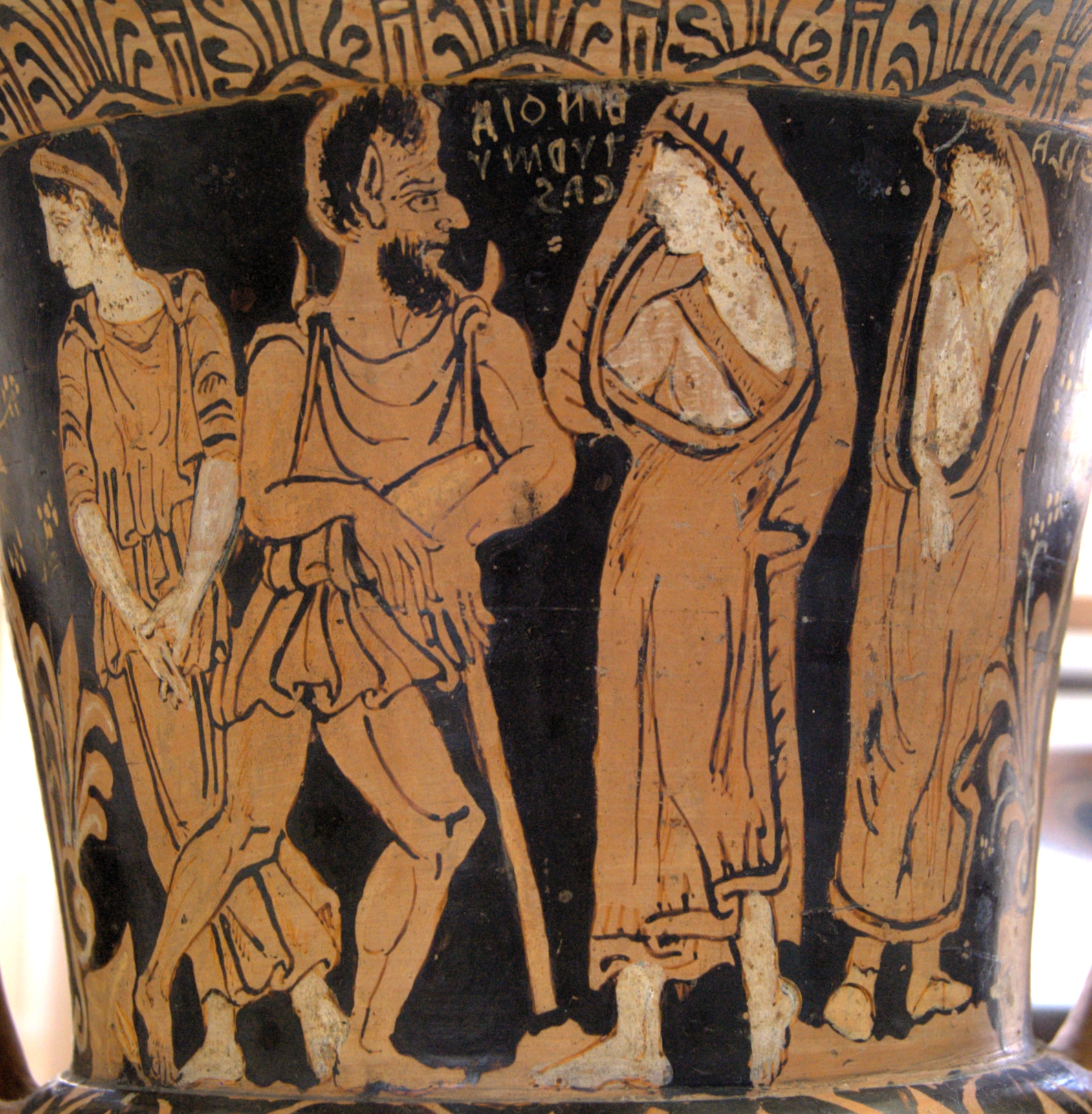
A typical depiction of Charun. From an Etruscan red-figure calyx-crater. End of the 4th century BC-beginning of the 3rd century BC.

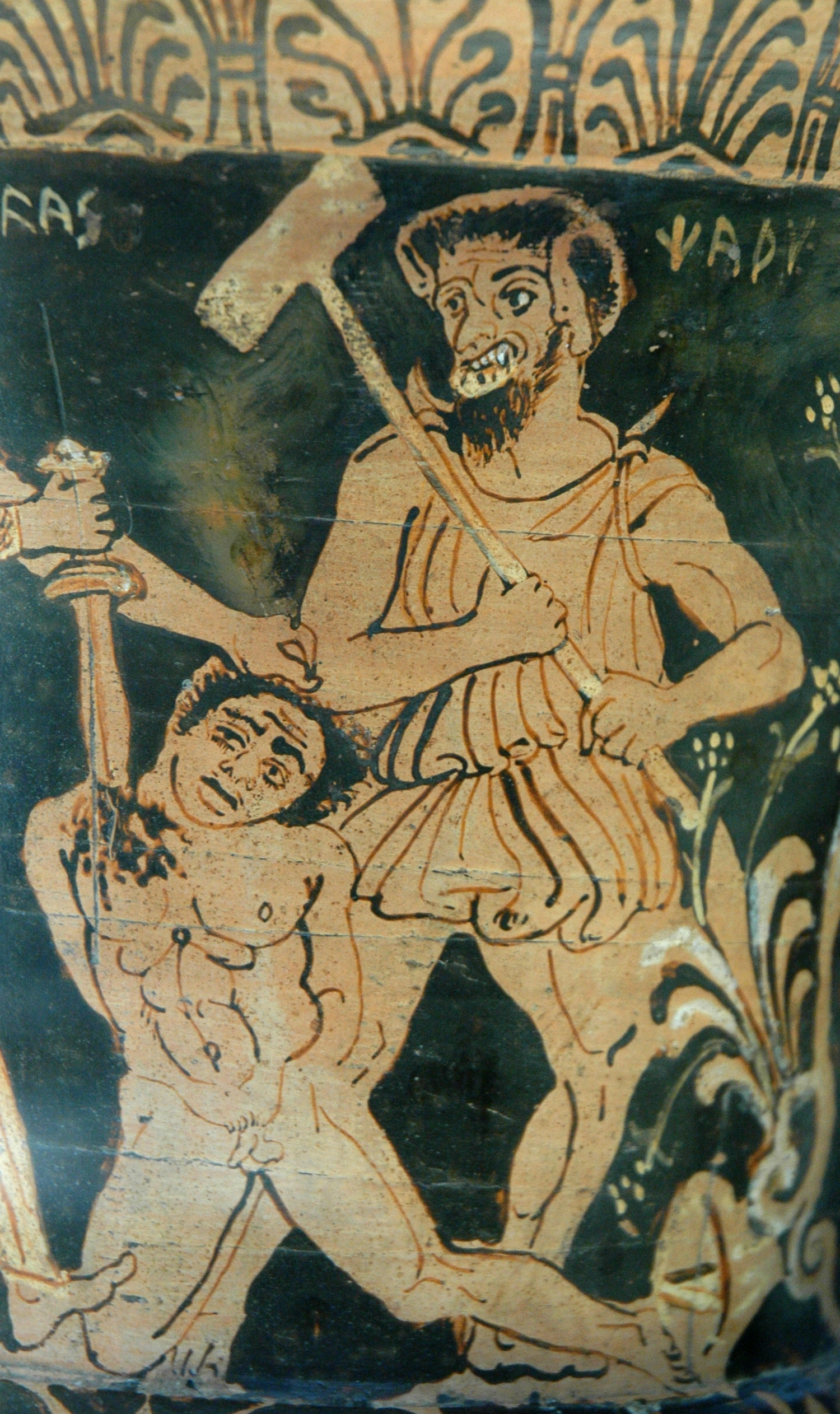
The other side of the same artifact, depicting Ajax killing a Trojan prisoner in front of Charun.

In Etruscan mythology, Charun (also spelled Charu, or Karun) acted as one of the psychopompoi of the underworld (not to be confused with the god of the underworld, known to the Etruscans as Aita). He is often portrayed with Vanth, a winged figure also associated with the underworld.

== Origins ==
His name was imported from Greek Charon, although it is uncertain whether Etruscans had a native name for a god of the underworld before this. As suggested by alternations in the Etruscan language such as θu "one" changing to θunśna "first", lev "lion" (from Greek leōn) and Apulu (from Greek Apóllōn), words ending in -n after u were disappearing from the language which is why we see his name spelled Xarun and later Xaru.

== Appearance ==
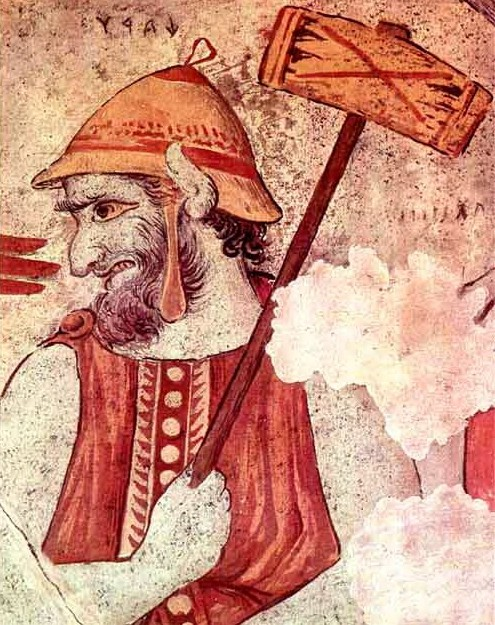
Charun with a hammer on a fresco in the François Tomb in Vulci, 4th century BC

The Etruscan Charun was fundamentally different from his Greek counterpart. Guarding the entry to the underworld, he is depicted with a hammer (his religious symbol) and is shown with pointed ears, snakes around his arms, and a blueish coloration symbolizing the decay of death. In some images, he has enormous wings. He is also depicted as a large creature with snake-like hair, a vulture's hooked nose, large tusks like a boar, heavy brow ridges, large lips, fiery eyes, pointed ears a black beard, enormous wings, discolored (pale cream, bluish or greyish) skin, and snakes around his arm.

== Function ==
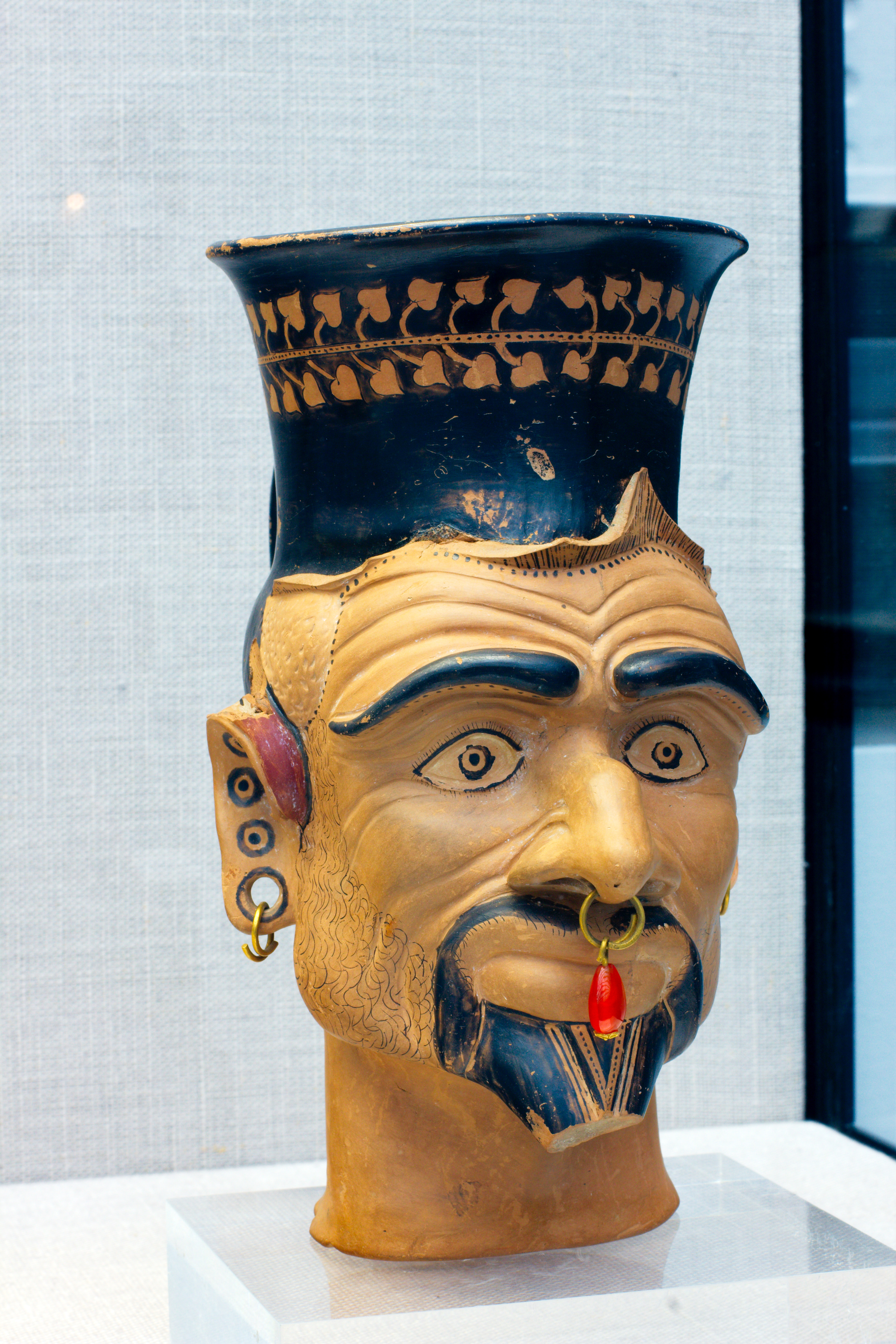
Charun, 500 BC, Staatliche Antikensammlungen

Larissa Bonfante and Judith Swaddling have this to say about Charun: "Many scenes feature the two purely Etruscan underworld demons, Vanth and Charu, whose job is not to punish the dead but rather to escort them to their final destination." However, there are at least two examples, on the sarcophagus of Laris Pulenas as well as a red figure stamnos from Orbetello, that do illustrate Charun in a menacing fashion. Each depicts Charun threatening a male figure with his hammer.

The grotesque nature of the depiction of Charun appears to have been at least partly apotropaic in nature. Apotropaic art was the practice of the neighboring Greeks at this time, as represented by the exaggerated eyes painted on drinking vessels in the 6th century BC to ward away spirits while drinking or the monstrous depiction of Medusa whose image was said to turn men to stone. Through these images of the grotesque, violence, and blood-letting, the Etruscans may have believed that they helped to fend off evil spirits from the tomb as well as sanctify the tomb perhaps in place of the actual ritual sacrifice of an animal usually performed in funerary rites.

Nancy de Grummond offers a different view. The relief on the sarcophagus of Laris Pulenas at Tarquinia, shows two Charuns swinging their hammers at a person's head, though the head (probably that of Pulenas, the nobleman whose sarcophagus it is) no longer survives in the relief due to an accident of preservation. Years later, in the Colosseum, a Charun-like figure called Dispater would hit the loser with a hammer to make sure he was dead, perhaps in reflection of Charun. The hammer might also be used to protect the dead; it is sometimes swung at serpents attacking the deceased (as shown on the Orvieto amphora). Most often it is simply held, or the handle planted on the ground and the mallet head leaned upon (above). De Grummond notes that the ferry of Charon appears only once in surviving Etruscan art, and that some Etruscan demons are equipped with oars, but they typically use them as weapons rather than in their maritime function.

== Modern views ==
Many authors tend to take a more sensationalist view of Charun, speaking of him as a "death-demon". Such authors may be inspired by Christian views of Hell and moral punishment. For the Etruscans, as with the Greeks, Hades was merely a morally neutral place of the dead. Neither the "good" nor the "bad" could escape the clutches of death, and both were assembled there together.

Ron Terpening, a professor of Italian literature at the University of Arizona, cites Franz de Ruyt, who claims Charun is similar to Chaldean demons or the Hindu divinities Shiva and Kali. He is presumed to be the servant of Mantus and Mania, and, like Charon, is comparable to the Greeks' Thanatos, the Erinyes, and the Keres. The author, like de Grummond, feels that some later Renaissance paintings of Greek Charon may show the continuity of pre-Christian Etruscan beliefs. Later on when the deity had evolved into the Greek Charon, or Caronte in Italian, Terpening notes that Charun's hammer or mallet is sometimes replaced with an oar, although it does not fit with his duties.

According to Jeff Rovin, Charun guided souls on horseback to the underworld and "brings horses to the newly-dead". He also claims that Charun appears to love violence and participates in warfare adding that Charun enjoys natural disasters as well. An Etruscan krater from François Tomb (above) depicts Charun with Ajax or Achilles (left, cropped out) slaughtering Trojan prisoners. This urn is currently held in Cabinet des Médailles 920, Bibliothéque Nationale, Paris. Rovin says that some accounts depict him with a sword, and that he "slices" souls with it. At least one image shows him guiding a soul on horseback, equipped with both a hammer and a sword, though he is simply carrying it on his person.

The Charon of Vergil in the Aeneid is particularly cruel; according to W.F. Jackson Knight, "Vergil's Charon is not only the Greek ferryman of Aristophanes [in The Frogs], but more than half his Etruscan self, Charun, the Etruscan torturing death-devil, no ferryman at all."

== Assistants ==
Charun is believed to have worked with many assistants in the Underworld, although they could be independent deities in their own right. Most of their names are lost to us, but at least one, Tuchulcha, is identified in the Tomb of Orcus II, and has hair and wings like a Gorgon. Tuchulcha, whose gender is debated among scholars, appears in a depiction of the story of Theseus (known to the Etruscans as "These") visiting the underworld. These and his friend Peirithous are playing a board game, attended by Tuchulcha.

There are four Charuns shown in a fresco in the Tomb of the Charuns in the Monterozzi necropolis in Tarquinia, and each appears to have sub-names. These are Charun Chunchules, the heavily blistered Charun Huths, Charun Lufe, and the fourth has crumbled away to illegibility. On Laris Pulena's sarcophagus, there are also two Charuns and two Vanths on either side of the figure in the center who is presumably Laris Pulena himself. De Grummond does not cite these figures as assistants, but believes Charun may be a type of creature rather than a singular demon.

Many of Charun's other presumed assistants appear in the Tomb of the Blue Demons, which is also the home of the only Etruscan rendering of the aforementioned ferry of Charon.
