= Tages =

Etruscan prophet

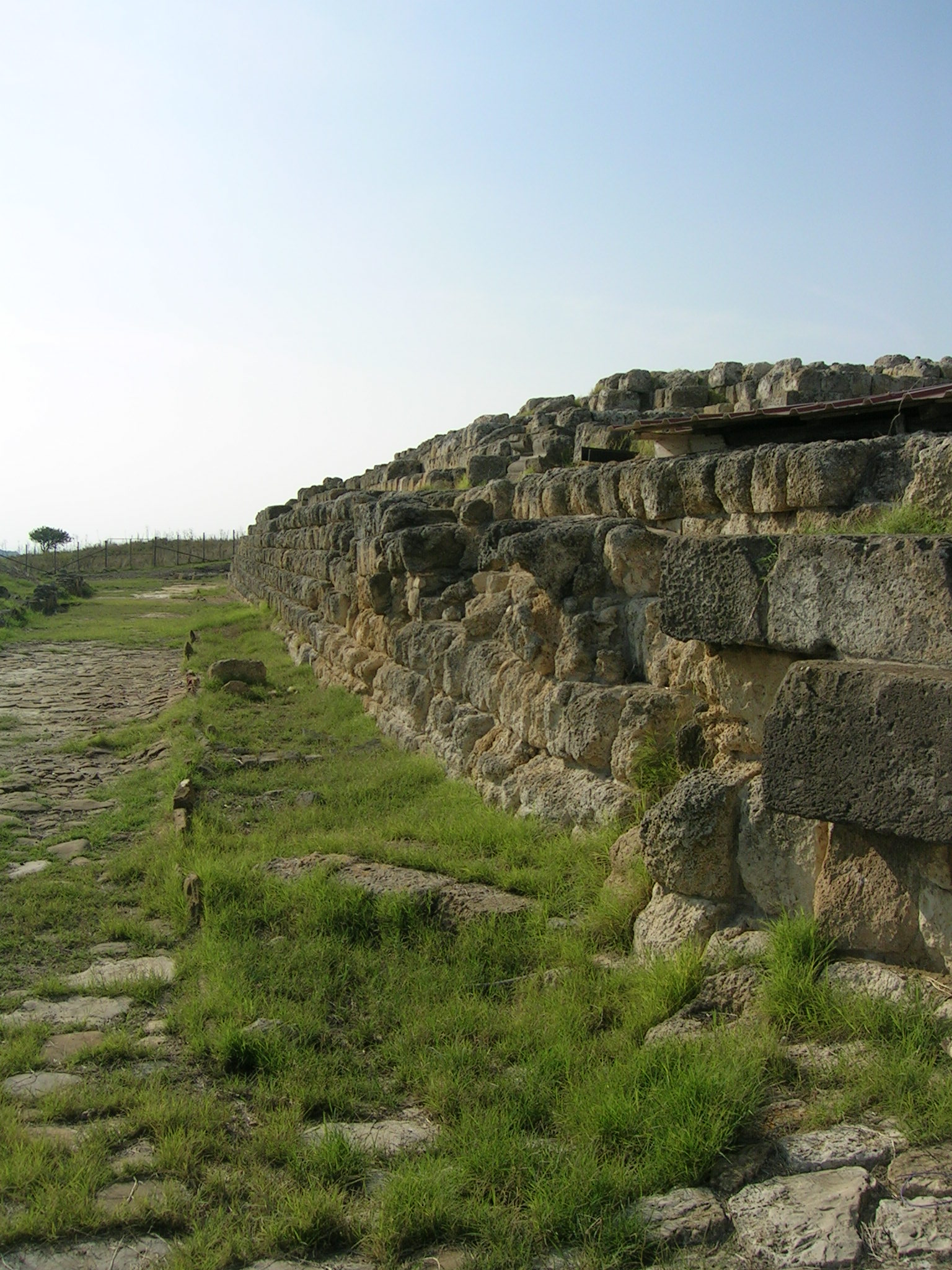
Foundation of Etruscan temple at Tarquinia, scene of the Tages legend.

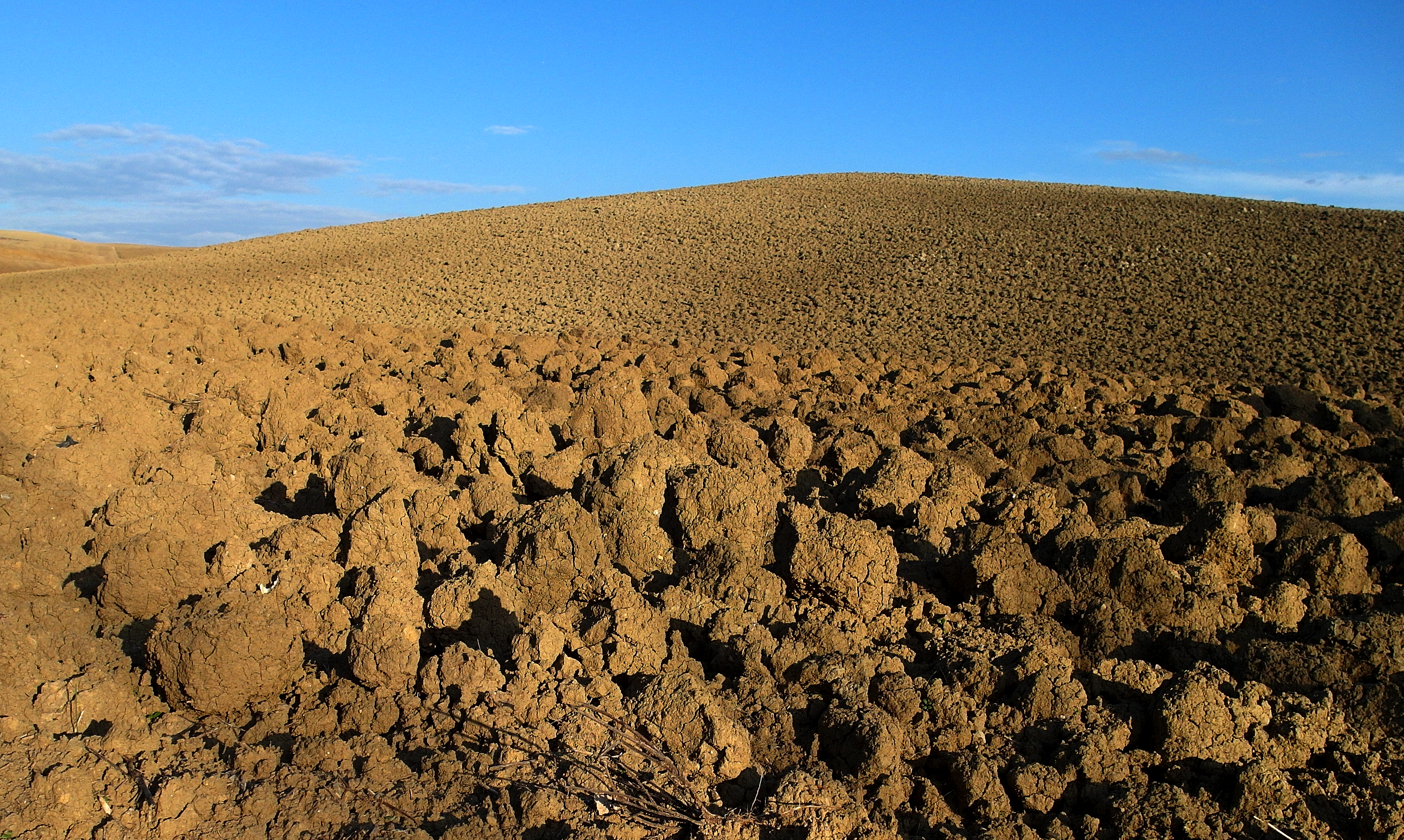
Furrows of the arable land in Umbria

Tages was claimed as a founding prophet of Etruscan religion who is known from reports by Latin authors of the late Roman Republic and Roman Empire. He revealed a cosmic view of divinity and correct methods of ascertaining divine will concerning events of public interest. Such divination was undertaken in Roman society by priestly officials called haruspices.

The religious texts recording the revelations of Tages (and a few other prophets, mainly a female figure known as Vegoia) were called by the Romans the Etrusca Disciplina at least as early as the late republic. They were written in the Etruscan language, despite their Latin titles. None presently survive. The last author claiming to have read elements of the disciplina is the sixth-century John the Lydian, writing at Constantinople. Thus, knowledge of Tages comes mainly from what is said about him by the classical authors, which is a legendary and quasimythical view; John the Lydian suggested Tages is only a parable.

== Etymology ==
As the Etruscan alphabet had no 'G', Tages is most likely a Latinization of an Etruscan word. The reverse of a third-century BC bronze mirror from Tuscania depicts a youthful haruspex in a conical hat examining a liver. He is labeled pavatarchies. A second, older haruspex with a beard listens and is labeled avl tarchunus. Massimo Pallottino made the generally accepted suggestion that the first name is to be segmented pava Tarchies and means "the child, Tarchies." The second name is "the son of Tarchon", where Tarchon is the legendary king of Tarquinia, location of Tages' revelation, and also one of the founders of the Etruscan League.

Giulio Mauro Facchetti proposed an alternative hypothesis linking the name to the repetitive Etruscan stem thac-/thax, which he interprets as 'voice'.

== Legend ==
There are multiple versions of the origins of Tages. Broadly Tages appeared from the earth while an Etruscan was ploughing, and then taught Etruscans divination. He is sometimes the grandson of Jove. Cicero reports the myth in this way:

They tell us that one day as the land was being ploughed in the territory of Tarquinii, and a deeper furrow than usual was made, suddenly Tages sprang out of it and addressed the ploughman. Tages, as it is recorded in the works of the Etrurians (Libri Etruscorum), possessed the visage of a child, but the prudence of a sage. When the ploughman was surprised at seeing him, and in his astonishment made a great outcry, a number of people assembled around him, and before long all the Etrurians came together at the spot. Tages then discoursed in the presence of an immense crowd, who noted his speech and committed it to writing. The information they derived from this Tages was the foundation of the science of the soothsayers (haruspicinae disciplina), and was subsequently improved by the accession of many new facts, all of which confirmed the same principles. We received this record from them. This record is preserved in their sacred books, and from it the augurial discipline is deduced.

In Ovid's version, Tyrrhenus arator ("a Tyrrhenian ploughman") observed a clod turn into a man and begin to speak of things destined to happen and how the Etruscan people could discover the future.

== Etrusca disciplina ==
Joannes Laurentius Lydus lived in the sixth century AD. Although the last classical-period writer to have read the books, he is the most specific about his sources. He implies that he read "the texts of the Etruscans"; that is, the Etrusca Disciplina, including the report of the haruspex, Tarchon, who was instructed by Tyrrhenus. Tarchon's work on Tages, he says, is a dialogue in which Tarchon asks Tages questions in "the ordinary language of the Italians". This is presumably Vulgar Latin, as Lydus cannot mean any early Italic dialect. Tages' recorded response is "in ancient letters", presumably in the Etruscan language. Lydus says it is not very understandable, and that he relies on translations.

== Representations of Tages ==
Labeled Etruscan representations of Tages are very rare, and scenes clearly tied to the Tages myth are almost as rare. Figures leaning on the lituus, the crooked staff of the augur, or examining entrails wearing the conical cap of the haruspex, are common, but are not necessarily Tages. Winged figures, representing divinity, are also common, especially on funerary urns from Tarquinia, but whether any depict Tages is questionable. Assuming that a certain percentage of these representations are, in fact, Tages, there appears to be no standard way to depict him. Art historians have inserted Tages freely among them but entirely in a speculative fashion.

In addition to the labelled scene on the bronze mirror described above, which must have been repeated many times without labels, a type of scene engraved on fourth-century BC gemstones, once set in seal rings, appears to describe the Tages myth. A bearded figure (Tarchon?) bends over as though listening at the head or head and torso of another, beardless figure embedded in or arising from the ground. On a similar theme is a third-century BC bronze votive statuette, .327 m (1.07 ft) high, from Tarquinia, of a sitting infant peering upward with an adult's head and visage.
