= Tuchulcha =

Etruscan underworld deity

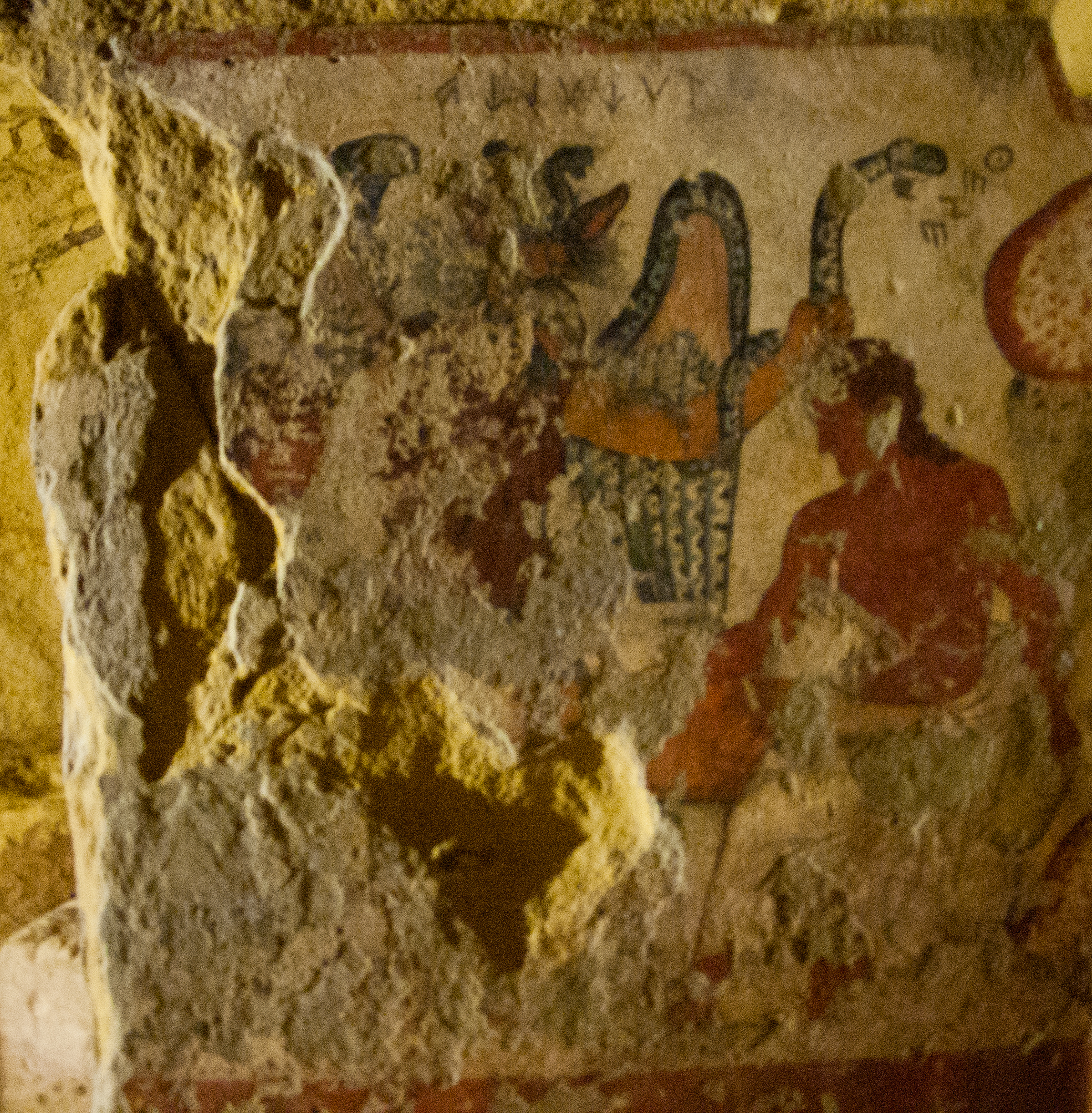
Tuchulcha and These in the Tomb of Orcus II, Tarquinia.

Tuchulcha was a chthonic daemon (not to be confused with the Christian term "demon") of Etruscan mythology, with pointed ears (perhaps those of a donkey), hair made of snakes, and a beak (perhaps that of a vulture). Tuchulcha lived in the underworld known as Aita. The only known depiction of Tuchulcha is a wall painting in the Tomb of Orcus II, in Tarquinia, Italy.

Many scholars refer to this deity as male because of masculine features, such as animalistic facial hair that may resemble a beard. According to Nancy de Grummond, "This monster is often referred to as male but in fact is very likely female (or neither gender), for she wears a woman’s dress, has decidedly pale pinkish skin (compare the standard brick-red male flesh of These), and even appears to have breasts." She also identifies the diamond-marking of Tuchulcha's serpents as identifying the poisonous adder (Vipera berus berus). Emeline Hill Richardson and Graeme Barker and Tom Rasmussen also state that Tuchulcha is female. Tuchulcha's garment is known to classical historians as a chiton and is worn by both men and women.

In the tomb painting, the deity appears in an episode from the story of These (Greek Theseus) visiting the underworld, where he and his friend Peirithous (only his head survives in the image) are playing a board game, attended by Tuchulcha.

== Reception ==
In the film, The Dead Are Alive (1972, directed by Armando Crispino), a fresco depicting Tuchulcha is the inspiration for a serial killer's murders occurring somewhere between Spoleto and Cerveteri.
