= Fanum Voltumnae =

Central sanctuary of the Etruscan league

- Sanctuary of Campo della Fiera
- Type: Federal sanctuary
- Periods: mid-6th century BC – 14th century AD
- Cultures: Etruscan, later Roman
- Location: Orvieto, Umbria, Italy

Site notes
- Excavation dates: 1876–1886; 1987; 2000–present
- Archaeologists: Simonetta Stopponi
- Website: campodellafiera.it

The Fanum Voltumnae was the principal federal sanctuary of the Etruscans, sacred to the deity whom Latin sources call Voltumna. According to Livy, representatives of the twelve peoples of the Etruscan League gathered there periodically to deliberate on matters of common concern and to celebrate religious ceremonies and solemn games. The Latin word fanum does not denote a single temple but a consecrated precinct as a whole, embracing buildings and spaces with distinct functions.

No ancient author records where the sanctuary stood, presumably because its location was common knowledge. Excavations conducted since 2000 at Campo della Fiera, on the plain below the cliff of Orvieto (Etruscan Velzna, Roman Volsinii), under the direction of Simonetta Stopponi, have uncovered a vast sanctuary complex which current scholarship largely identifies with the Fanum Voltumnae.

What became of the sanctuary after the Roman conquest of Velzna (264 BC) remains disputed: some scholars argue for unbroken cult continuity on the site into late antiquity, while others posit a hiatus, or the transfer of the federal functions to the refounded Volsinii Novi (Bolsena).

== The deity ==
The Latin theonym Voltumna renders an Etruscan form that is not directly attested and is reconstructed as *Velthum(e)na; the variant Veltune labels a bearded male figure holding a spear on the well-known engraved mirror from Tuscania depicting a scene of haruspicy. Varro calls the god deus Etruriae princeps, a phrase whose meaning is debated: while part of the scholarship reads it as a statement of pre-eminence within the Etruscan pantheon, others, such as Gérard Capdeville, take it to mean the first Etruscan god brought to Rome, and Francesco Marcattili likewise rules out a hierarchical sense.

That the deity was male is now settled in scholarship: the confusion over gender, already present in antiquity and echoed by some modern critics, is explained by the Latin reception of Etruscan names ending in -na, which could be taken as either masculine or feminine. The prevailing view, upheld among others by Pettazzoni, Pfiffig, Roncalli and Cristofani, sees in Velthumna an epithet of Tinia, the supreme Etruscan god, worshipped in the territory of Volsinii in his chthonic aspect; Capdeville instead regards Tinia and Voltumna as two distinct deities.

Latin sources equate Voltumna with the Roman god Vertumnus, whose ancient statue stood in the vicus Tuscus at Rome. In Giorgio Ferri's reconstruction, however, the two cults had separate origins: Vortumnus would be a Latin deity, linked to the verb vertere and epigraphically unattested in Etruria, whose perceived Etruscan character derived from the statue's position in Rome's Etruscan quarter; the identification with Voltumna would have crystallised on the occasion of the probable, though not certain, evocatio performed by the consul Marcus Fulvius Flaccus at the fall of Velzna. To the summoned god Flaccus dedicated a temple on the Aventine, whose dies natalis fell on the Ides of August (13 August), the same day as that of the Aventine temple of Diana: a coincidence linking the tutelary deities of the two great leagues of central Italy, the Etruscan and the Latin.

== Ancient sources ==
Livy names the fanum Voltumnae explicitly in five passages (4.23.5; 4.25.7; 4.61.2; 5.17.6; 6.2.2), concerning events between 434 and 389 BC. The councils he records were convened above all in connection with the conflict between Rome and Veii: the other Etruscan cities repeatedly debated the Veientine appeals for help without ever agreeing on a common course of action. Further passages of Livy (2.44.8; 7.21.9) and of Dionysius of Halicarnassus (3.59.4; 9.1.2; 9.18.2–4) mention Etruscan councils without naming the sanctuary; the apparently irregular spacing of the recorded meetings has suggested that they did not follow a fixed calendar.

A passage of Livy referring to 403 BC (5.1) reports that at the sanctuary the twelve peoples annually elected a sacerdos by vote, and that solemn games were held there whose interruption was deemed sacrilege (sollemnia ludorum quos intermitti nefas est): the king of Veii, angered at losing the election, withdrew the performers from the games and thereby drew the hostility of the other peoples upon his city. Fairs and markets accompanied the gatherings, as Livy's mention of mercatores implies. In the Archaic period the twelve lucumones may have chosen one of their number as primus inter pares; in the imperial age the honorific title praetor Etruriae XV populorum, Etruscan zilaθ meχl rasnal, is attested.

Other sources tie the sanctuary and its god to Volsinii: Propertius attests the Volsinian origin of Vertumnus; Pliny the Elder, drawing on Metrodorus of Scepsis, states that the Roman conquest of the city yielded a booty of two thousand bronze statues, a figure pointing to the wealth of a great cult place; Festus records that in the god's Aventine temple Fulvius Flaccus had himself portrayed in the toga picta of a triumphator. Valerius Maximus describes Volsinii as wealthy, well ordered in customs and laws, the "caput Etruriae".

=== The Rescript of Spello ===
The so-called Rescript of Spello (CIL XI 5265), a stone copy of a document issued by the chancery of Constantine between AD 333 and 337 and found in 1733 near the temple area of Villa Fidelia, released the Umbrians, represented by the inhabitants of Hispellum, from the obligation of travelling every year to Volsinii to celebrate, together with the Etruscans and "according to ancient custom", theatrical and gladiatorial games. The document shows that the festivals which had replaced the Etruscan councils were still alive in late antiquity, having become under Diocletian the focus of the imperial cult of the province of Tuscia et Umbria, entrusted to the coronatus Tusciae et Umbriae. Scholars disagree over whether the Volsinii of the rescript is the Roman town at Bolsena or the sanctuary area below Orvieto (see below).

== History of research ==
The question of the sanctuary's location arose in the Renaissance. In the fifteenth century the Dominican friar Annio da Viterbo placed it at Viterbo, within the web of learned forgeries through which he sought to endow his home town with an illustrious past. In the nineteenth century George Dennis proposed first the hill of Montefiascone and later Viterbo; other suggestions ranged from Civita Castellana, the Voltone and Monte Becco near Farnese, the very cliff of Orvieto and Tarquinia, to the unidentified centres of Oenarea and Trossulum. According to Pietro Tamburini, these searches rested on a basic misunderstanding: fanum was read as "temple" and therefore sought on a commanding height, whereas a sanctuary meant to host councils, games, contests and fairs required broad level ground, on the model of the panhellenic sanctuary of Olympia.

In 1935 the Orvietan scholar Geralberto Buccolini, re-examining the reports of nineteenth-century digs in the valley south-west of the cliff, which had brought to light the walls of monumental buildings and architectural terracottas of high quality, some of which soon ended up in Berlin, proposed to locate the fanum in the "Giardino della Regina" area within the broader Campo della Fiera. A first confirmation came by chance in 1987, when the trench dug for Orvieto's new aqueduct produced large amounts of Etruscan building material together with Etruscan, Greek and eastern pottery; a subsequent trial excavation by the Archaeological Superintendency for Umbria identified a Roman road flanked by earlier buildings on a different alignment.

Systematic excavation began in the summer of 2000 under the University of Macerata, directed by Simonetta Stopponi; in 2008 the concession passed to the University of Perugia, joined the following year by the University of Foggia, with the scientific direction unchanged. The campaigns continue on an annual basis.

== The sanctuary ==
The sanctuary extends over more than three hectares, of which upwards of 30,000 square metres have been investigated in depth. After sporadic traces of Villanovan frequentation, the material record becomes substantial shortly before the middle of the sixth century BC, with fragments of first-phase architectural terracottas and Greek pottery; Attic imports grow markedly in the third quarter of the century.

Two paved roads cross the site: one, laid out around the middle of the third century BC, five metres wide and rutted by cart traffic, linked Orvieto to Bolsena; the other, between seven and nine metres wide, short and straight, is interpreted as the sanctuary's sacred way. The central sector is occupied by a sacred enclosure, rebuilt several times between the Republican and imperial periods and marked by two wells: within it stand the small temple A, facing east and fronted by altars of tuff and trachyte, a monumental trachyte donarium, a stone thesaurus for coin offerings, and a quadrangular structure that contained an inscribed base. A second, large temple building (temple B), aligned with the sacred way and set on rising ground with a commanding view, is regarded by some scholars as the sanctuary's main temple, perhaps that of Voltumna; a third Archaic building (temple C) stood along the eastern side of the sacred way.

The architectural terracottas recovered, often with well-preserved polychromy, span the late sixth to the early third century BC; the find of a mould of Classical date shows that part of the decoration was produced locally for the sanctuary. The votive material includes Attic black- and red-figure pottery, bronzes, female votive heads and coins of Umbrian, Greek and Siculo-Punic mints, evidence of a catchment reaching beyond Etruria.

=== Inscriptions ===
The most significant epigraphic find is the trachyte base for a bronze statue, bearing the longest Archaic inscription so far known from Orvieto, cut on two sides: kanuta larecenas lautenitha aranthia pinies puia turuce / tluschval marvethul faliathere. In Stopponi's reading the text records the offering made by Kanuta, a freedwoman of the Larecena family and wife of Aranth Pinie, to the female deities Tluschva of the abode in the "heavenly place" (faliathere); Giovanni Colonna instead takes the divine group as male and construes the word marvethul differently. The dedication by a freedwoman has been connected with a competence of the sanctuary in the sphere of manumission.

A fragmentary grey bucchero bowl carries the word apas ("of the father") scratched on its inner base: Colonna recognises in it a dedication to Voltumna as father of the gods, whereas Stopponi prefers to refer the term to Dionysus. A black-gloss plate from a fountain by temple B bears the digraph ve, which Stopponi has tentatively proposed to expand as an abbreviation of Veltune. No inscription naming the titular deity in full has yet come to light.

=== Cults ===
The evidence from the enclosure sector points, in Stopponi's view, to female worship addressed to goddesses of Demeter-like, chthonic character: indications include the many female votive heads and statues, the feminine objects deposited in the votive pits and, above all, the arm of an acrolithic statue in basaltic stone whose hand grasps a pomegranate, perhaps belonging to the cult statue venerated at temple A. As for the Tluschva deities named in Kanuta's dedication, Adriano Maggiani sees in them a group of goddesses tied to the natural and vegetal world, comparable to the Greek Charites or Nymphs; Stopponi asks whether they might rather be brought close to Demeter and Kore, while Colonna takes them to be male. Alongside the feminine element, Stopponi notes recurrent Dionysiac features: images of Dionysus and his retinue on the Greek pottery, the oinochoe shaped as the god's face and the ram's-head rhyta from the quadrangular structure, the graffito apas, the remains of vine wood and leaves inside the thesaurus, and a Roman-period antefix with confronted panthers flanking what is probably a thyrsus. Other theonyms under discussion include Vei, on Colonna's rereading of an inscribed loom weight, and śuri, to whom the same scholar refers the dark stone cippi otherwise assigned to Tinia. As a token of the complexity of the sanctuary's cults, Stopponi recalls Propertius, who among the transformations of Vertumnus lists the guises of Bacchus and Apollo.

=== Roman and medieval phases ===
Between the late first century BC and the early first century AD a large residence with two bath suites, the second of Hadrianic date, was built at the southern end of the sacred way; its interpretation is contested (see below). The thesaurus by temple A yielded a deposit of 221 coins running down to asses of Augustan date, showing that the spot was still felt to be sacred long after the Roman conquest; analysis of the wood remains found inside it identified Vitis vinifera, a suggestive datum in the light of Velzna's Greek name, Oinarea. Near temple A a marble bust of an imperial-age dignitary, variously dated between the late Hadrianic and the Severan period, was found carefully buried in a pit, an act read as one of pietas.

In the Middle Ages the church of San Pietro in vetere rose on the site, with an adjoining convent, and was frequented until the Black Death of 1348; the very toponym Campo della Fiera preserves the memory of the area's long use for markets and fairs.

== The debate on continuity after 264 BC ==
The Roman conquest of Velzna (264 BC) directly involved the sanctuary: besides Pliny's report of the two thousand bronze statues, this is documented by the many lead sling bullets recovered in the area and by the donarium that Fulvius Flaccus dedicated with part of the spoils in the sacred area of Sant'Omobono at Rome. On what followed, scholarship divides into at least three positions.

For Stopponi and the excavators, the site shows unbroken frequentation from the second half of the sixth century BC down to 1348: temple A remained in use, the thesaurus went on receiving offerings into the Augustan age, and the residence built over the sacred way may be read as an official seat, perhaps connected with the praetor Etruriae, within the Augustan revival of the sanctuary's functions. Stopponi herself observes, however, that in the Roman period cult activity continued at temple A alone, while temples B and C were abandoned, and that the material so far recovered from temple C points to a destruction earlier than Flaccus's triumph, referable to the clashes between Rome and Volsinii of 308–280 BC; the infant burials laid along the building's perimeter she tentatively connects with the cult of a matronal deity suggested by the inscriptions atial and hu, rather than with a mere loss of sanctity.

Mario Torelli regards the question of a possible break between 264 BC and the early imperial period as still open, but places at Campo della Fiera the reconstitution of the Etruscan league promoted in the Augustan age, when the number of peoples was raised from twelve to fifteen and the offices of praetor and aedilis Etruriae became coveted honours for senators and knights, up to the emperor Hadrian himself; the mosaic-paved hall at the centre of the area, hard to reconcile with a private domus in the middle of a suburban sacred zone, would have served as the meeting place of the delegates and the venue for the praetor's election.

A minority position, argued by Pietro Tamburini in the wake of Paolo Bruschetti's conclusions, holds instead that the sanctuary lost its federal function for good with the sack: pointers would be the abandonment of temples B and C, the digging of graves within the sacred area as early as the fourth and third centuries BC, the building of the bath residence over the roadway of the sacred way and, above all, the total absence of Latin public inscriptions, which should have survived in quantity had the Augustan restoration of the ludi concerned this site. The federal cult would have been re-established in the Augustan age at the new Volsinii (Bolsena), where at Prato Rigo the monumental remains of a proto-Augustan building attributed to the town's theatre have come to light; on this reading, the Volsinii of the Rescript of Spello is unambiguously Bolsena. Tamburini also notes that Stopponi has progressively revised her own reading of the rescript, moving from an identification with Bolsena (1999) through a probabilistic wording (2006) to indicating Orvieto as the seat of the celebrations (2013).

== Bibliography ==
=== Ancient sources ===
- Livy, Ab Urbe condita, 2.44; 4.23–25, 61; 5.1, 17; 6.2; 7.21.
- Dionysius of Halicarnassus, Roman Antiquities, 3.59; 9.1, 18.
- Varro, De lingua latina, 5.46.
- Propertius, Elegies, 4.2.
- Pliny the Elder, Naturalis historia, 34.34.
- Festus, De verborum significatu, 228 L.
- Valerius Maximus, Memorable Deeds and Sayings, 9.1, ext. 2.

=== Modern scholarship ===
- Bartoloni, Gilda (2012). "L'architettura". In Bartoloni, Gilda (ed.). Introduzione all'Etruscologia (in Italian). Milan: Hoepli. pp. 253–308.
- Bizzarri, Claudio (2016). "Southern and Inner Etruria: Benchmark Sites and Current Excavations". In Bell, Sinclair; Carpino, Alexandra A. (eds.). A Companion to the Etruscans. Malden–Oxford: Wiley. pp. 117–128.
- Bruschetti, Paolo (1999). "Indagini di scavo a Campo della Fiera presso Orvieto". Annali della Fondazione per il Museo «Claudio Faina» (in Italian). VI: 159–181.
- Cherici, Armando (2012). ""Asylum aperit": considerazioni sul fanum Voltumnae e sui santuari emporici tra religione, commercio e politica". Annali della Fondazione per il Museo «Claudio Faina» (in Italian). XIX: 293–326.
- Colonna, Giovanni (2012). "I santuari comunitari e il culto delle divinità ctonie". Annali della Fondazione per il Museo «Claudio Faina» (in Italian). XIX: 203–226.
- Dennis, George (1848). The Cities and Cemeteries of Etruria. London: John Murray.
- Ferri, Giorgio (2009). "Voltumna-Vortumnus". In Braidotti, Cecilia; Dettori, Emanuele; Lanzillotta, Eugenio (eds.). Οὐ πᾶν ἐφήμερον. Scritti in memoria di Roberto Pretagostini (in Italian). Vol. II. Rome: Università di Roma Tor Vergata. pp. 993–1009.
- Harari, Maurizio (2012). "Storia degli studi". In Bartoloni, Gilda (ed.). Introduzione all'Etruscologia (in Italian). Milan: Hoepli. pp. 19–46.
- Marcattili, Francesco (2022). "Voltumna, Vertumnus: divinità e servitus tra Etruria e Roma". Studi Etruschi (in Italian). LXXXV: 223–237.
- Ranucci, Samuele (2009). "Il thesaurus di Campo della Fiera, Orvieto (Volsinii)". Annali dell'Istituto Italiano di Numismatica (in Italian). 55: 103–139.
- Stopponi, Simonetta (2012). "Il Fanum Voltumnae: dalle divinità Tluschva a San Pietro". Annali della Fondazione per il Museo «Claudio Faina» (in Italian). XIX: 7–75.
- Stopponi, Simonetta (2013a). "Orvieto, Campo della Fiera – Fanum Voltumnae". In Turfa, Jean MacIntosh (ed.). The Etruscan World. London–New York: Routledge. pp. 632–654.
- Stopponi, Simonetta (2013b). "La ricerca del Fanum Voltumnae: gli scavi in località Campo della Fiera". In Della Fina, Giuseppe M.; Pellegrini, Enrico (eds.). Da Orvieto a Bolsena: un percorso tra Etruschi e Romani (in Italian). Pisa: Pacini Editore. pp. 136–147. ISBN 978-88-6315-552-5.
- Stopponi, Simonetta (2025). "Un nucleo di antefisse dal santuario di Campo della Fiera di Orvieto". In Bellelli, Vincenzo; Esposito, Marta; Rescigno, Carlo (eds.). Deliciae Fictiles VI. Architectural Terracottas in Ancient Italy (in Italian). Albano di Lucania: MP Editor. pp. 17–25.
- Tamburini, Pietro (2002). "Bolsena: emergenze archeologiche a valle della città romana". Annali della Fondazione per il Museo «Claudio Faina» (in Italian). IX: 541–580.
- Tamburini, Pietro (2017). "La scoperta del fanum Voltumnae, il santuario federale della Lega etrusca". In Francocci, Stefano (ed.). Archeologia e storia a Nepi III. Quaderni del Museo Civico di Nepi, 4 (in Italian). Vetralla: Davide Ghaleb Editore. pp. 11–26.
- Torelli, Mario (1968). "Il donario di M. Fulvio Flacco nell'area di S. Omobono". Quaderni dell'Istituto di Topografia Antica dell'Università di Roma (in Italian). 5: 71–75.
- Torelli, Mario (2017). "The Etruscan Legacy". In Naso, Alessandro (ed.). Etruscology. Berlin–Boston: De Gruyter. pp. 685–720.

== See also ==
- Voltumna
- Vertumnus
- Etruscan League
- Orvieto
- Bolsena
