= Annius of Viterbo =

Italian Dominican friar, scholar and historian

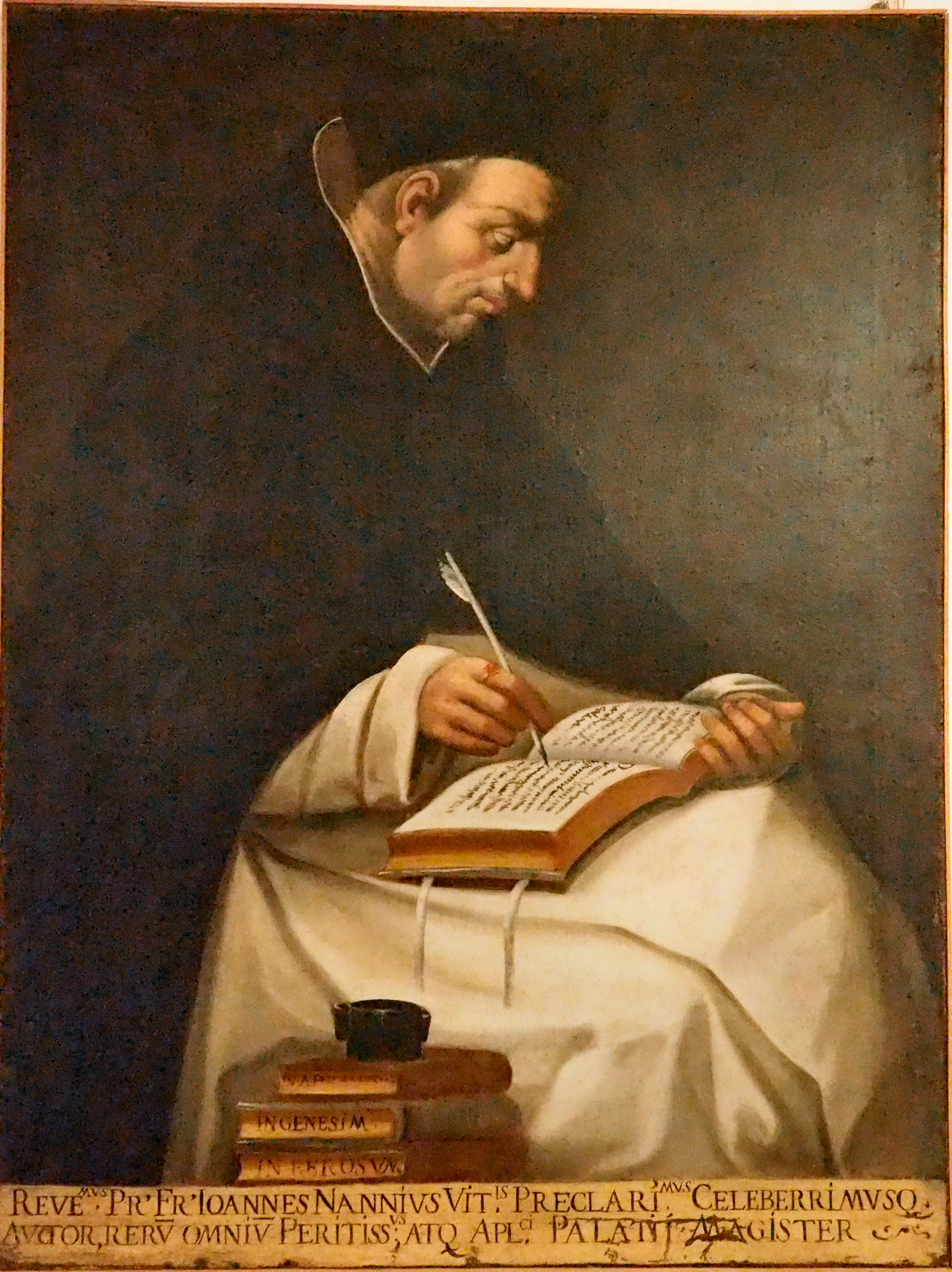

Personal life
- Born: Giovanni Nanni; 5 January 1437 Viterbo, Papal States
- Died: 13 November 1502 (aged 65) Rome, Papal States
- Era: Renaissance
- Notable work: Antiquitatum Variarum
- Education: Santa Maria sopra Minerva

Religious life
- Religion: Christianity
- Order: Dominican

Senior posting
- Post: Master of the Sacred Palace

Annius of Viterbo (Latin: Joannes Annius Viterb(i)ensis; 5 January 1437 – 13 November 1502) was an Italian Dominican friar, scholar, and historian, born Giovanni Nanni in Viterbo. He is now remembered primarily for his fabrications.

== Life ==
He entered the Dominican Order early in life. He obtained the degree of Master of Theology from the studium generale at Santa Maria sopra Minerva, the forerunner of the College of Saint Thomas and the Pontifical University of Saint Thomas Aquinas, Angelicum. He served as a lector at the studium sometime before 1466.

He was highly esteemed by Sixtus IV and Alexander VI; the latter made him Master of the Sacred Palace in 1499.

As a linguist, he spuriously claimed to be skilled in the Semitic languages. Walter Stephens says: "His expertise in Semitic philology, once celebrated even by otherwise sober ecclesiastical historians, was entirely fictive." Annius also claimed to be able to read Etruscan.

In perhaps his most elaborate pseudo-archeological charade, in the autumn of 1493, he undertook a well-publicized dig at Viterbo, during which marble statues of some of the most dramatic of the mythical figures associated with the city's legendarium appeared to be unearthed; they had all been "salted" in the site beforehand.

== Works ==
He is best known for his Antiquitatum Variarum, originally titled the Commentaria super opera diversorum auctorum de antiquitatibus loquentium (Commentaries on the Works of Various Authors Discussing Antiquity) and often known as the Antiquities of Annius. In this work, he published alleged writings and fragments of several pre-Christian Greek and Latin secular authors, destined to throw an entirely new light on ancient history. He claimed to have discovered them at Mantua.

Among his numerous other writings were De futuris Christianorum triumphis in Turcos et Saracenos (Future Triumphs of the Christians over the Turks and the Saracens), a commentary on the Apocalypse, dedicated to Sixtus IV, to Christian kings, princes, and governments, and Tractatus de imperio Turcorum (The Empire of the Turks). The author identifies Mohammad as the Antichrist, and predicts that the end of the world will take place when the Christians will have overcome the Jews and the Muslims, an event which did not appear to him to be far distant.

One influential suggestion he made — in his commentary on the Breviarium de Temporibus of Pseudo-Philo — was that the genealogy of Jesus in the Gospel of Luke traced the lineage through the father of Mary. In the Breviarium de Temporibus, the Christ's grandfather Eli according to Luke was identified with Eliachim, an alleged variant of St Joachim, the Virgin Mary's father according to the apocryphal Protoevangelium of James. According to Annius, the Marian direct descendance from king David testified Christ's inheritance of the throne of Israel in the lineage of His holy mother.

The more important of his unpublished works are:

- Volumen libris septuaginta distinctum de antiquitatibus et gestis Etruscorum;
- De correctione typographica chronicorum;
- De dignitate officii Magistri Sacri Palatii (On the Esteem of the Office of the Master of the Sacred Palace);
- Chronologia Nova, in which he undertakes to correct the anachronisms in the writings of Eusebius of Caesarea;
- De marmoreis volturrhenis tabulis: the modern editor's preface affirmed it was "the first epigraphic study in western scholarship".

He was notorious for his text depicting the history and topography of ancient Rome from the "most ancient" authors. His Auctores vetustissimi printed at Rome, 1498, was an anthology of seventeen purportedly classical texts, all of which he had written himself, with which he embarks in the gigantic attempt to write a universal history of the post-diluvian West civilization, where the Etruscan people and the town of Viterbo/Etruria, custodian of the original knowledge of divine nature, takes on the leading role in the march of Man towards the future. Annius's map of Rome as founded by Romulus is a loose interpretation of one of his own forgeries. It prominently features Vicus Tuscus, the home of the Etruscans, whom Annius and his fellow Viterbans claimed as their ancestors. Part of the forgeries were motivated by a desire to prove that Viterbo was the site of the Etruscan Fanum Voltumnae.

In a defense of the papal lending institution, the Monte di Pietà, published c. 1495 under the title Pro Monte Pietatis, Annius contributed the essay Questiones due disputate super mutuo iudaico & ciuili & diuino, arguing against the usury of the Jews.

Looking for a patronage, Annius published its first treatise in February 1491 and dedicated it to Ranuccio Farnese. Analyzing the works of Diodorus Siculus, Annius supposed Isis and Osiris established new colonies in the Mediterranean Sea, the latter founding Viterbo, so as to derive a divine and Egyptian ancestry for the family of the ongoing Pope Alexander III, brother of Ranuccio.

== Detection of his forgeries ==
The Antiquities met at once both with believers and with severe critics who accused him of willful interpolation, or even fabrication. The content was falsely attributed to Berosus, Fabius Pictor, Cato the Elder, Manetho and others. The spurious character of these "historians" of Annius, which he published both with and without commentaries, has long been admitted. The demolition of the forgeries owed much to Joseph Justus Scaliger.

Annius's forgeries began to unravel by the mid-16th century. In 1565–66, the humanist Girolamo Mei was engaged in a historiographical argument with Vincenzo Borghini, who presented a claim, for the occasion of the marriage of Francesco I de' Medici and Joanna of Austria, that Florence was founded by Augustus. He based his claim on inscriptions reported by Annius of Viterbo. Mei, no friend to the Medici, challenged this opinion and questioned the authenticity of Annius's materials, in a brief Latin treatise (De origine urbis Florentiae).

== Viterbiae historiae epitoma ==
The volume Annio da Viterbo, Documenti e ricerche (Rome: Multigrafica Editrice for CNR, 1981) presents an unpublished work written by Annius: the Viterbiae historiae epitoma in the critical text edited by Giovanni Baffioni. The text is based on the manuscript Codex Vaticanus Latinus 6263 and represents the seventh and only extant book of the former work of Annius' Viterbia Historia, composed of seven books in which the Viterbian theologian writes the history of his municipal town ranging from its mythological origins (newly reinvented by Annius himself) until the times of Pope Innocent VIII. The second part of the book, edited by Paola Mattiangeli, deals with his influence on High Renaissance myth and allegory. In particular, it refers to Annius's esoteric interests and his influence over a number of painted frescoes in the city of Viterbo characterized by Egyptian imagery.

== See also ==
- Codex Nanianus
