= Voltumna =

Etruscan deity

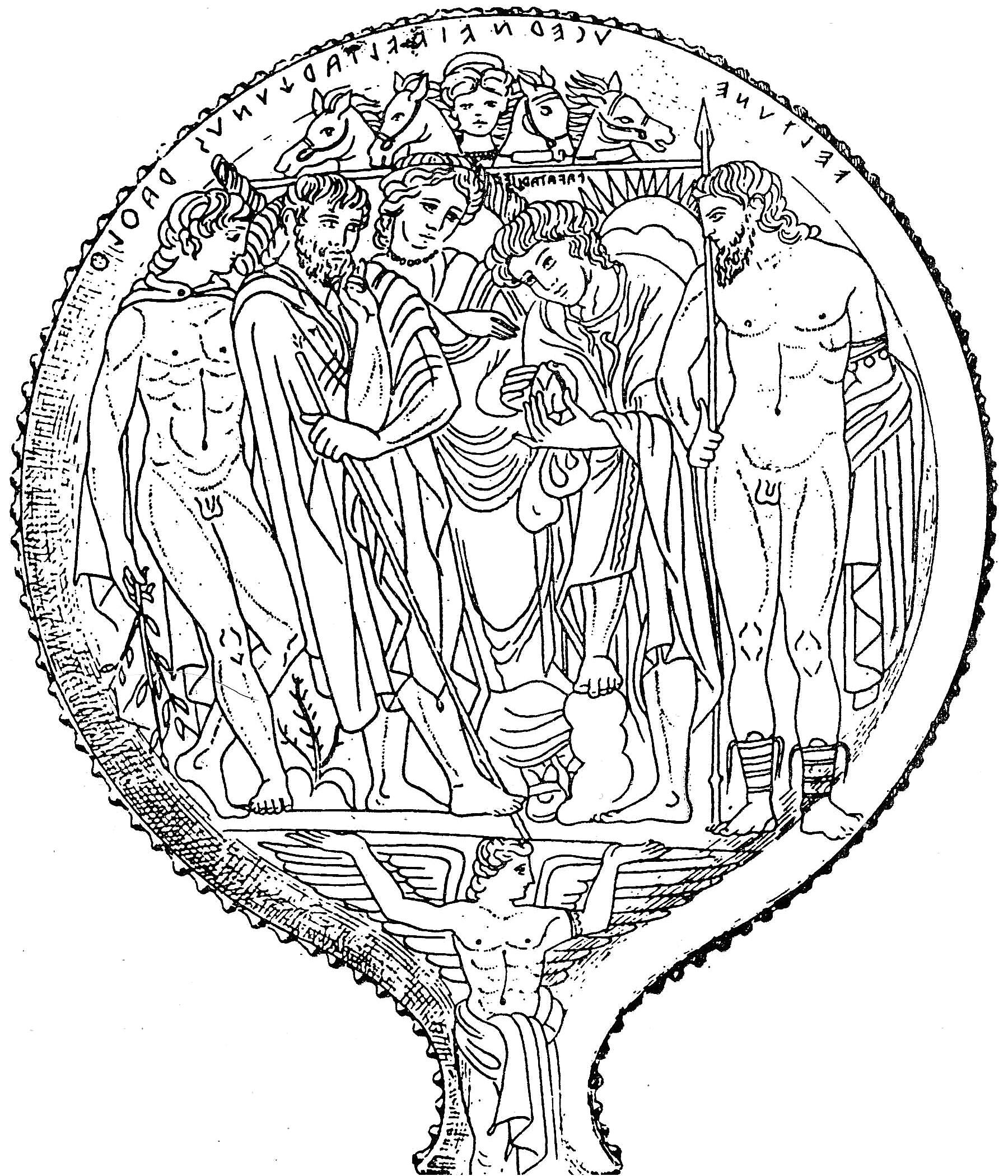
- A bronze mirror from Tuscania depicting from left to right Veltune, Avle (the son of Tarchon), Ucernei, Pava Tarchies, and Rath
- Other names: Veltune, Veltha
- Major cult center: Volsinii
- Ethnic group: Etruscans
- Temple: Fanum Voltumnae

Equivalents
- Roman: Vertumnus, Fortuna

Voltumna, also known as Veltune or Veltha, is a chthonic deity of uncertain gender in Etruscan religion, who became the supreme god of the Etruscan pantheon, the deus Etruriae princeps, according to Varro.

Voltumna's cult was centered in Volsinii (modern-day Bolsena), a city of the Etruscan civilization of central Italy. Voltumna is shown with contrasting characteristics, such as a maleficent monster, a chthonic vegetation god of uncertain sex, or a mighty war god. The volcanic activity of Lake Bolsena were believed to be caused by Voltumna's destructive aspects.

The bond of the twelve Etruscan populi was renewed annually at the sacred grove of Fanum Voltumnae, the sanctuary of Voltumnus sited near Volsinii, which was mentioned by Livy. During this assembly, a long nail would be ritually driven into a cell of the temple, in order to fix the passage of time for the Etruscan's sacred calendar. At the Fanum Voltumnae ludi were held, though whether they were athletic or artistic in nature is unknown.

In the Roman Forum, near the Temple of Castor and Pollux stood a shrine dedicated to Voltumna in the Vicus Tuscus.

They were associated with the Roman Fortuna and were eventually adopted into Rome as Vertumnus.

== See also ==
- Tinia
