= Santa Maria delle Grazie, Montefiascone =

Church in Montefiascone, Italy

Coordinates: 42.54437°N 12.0387°E

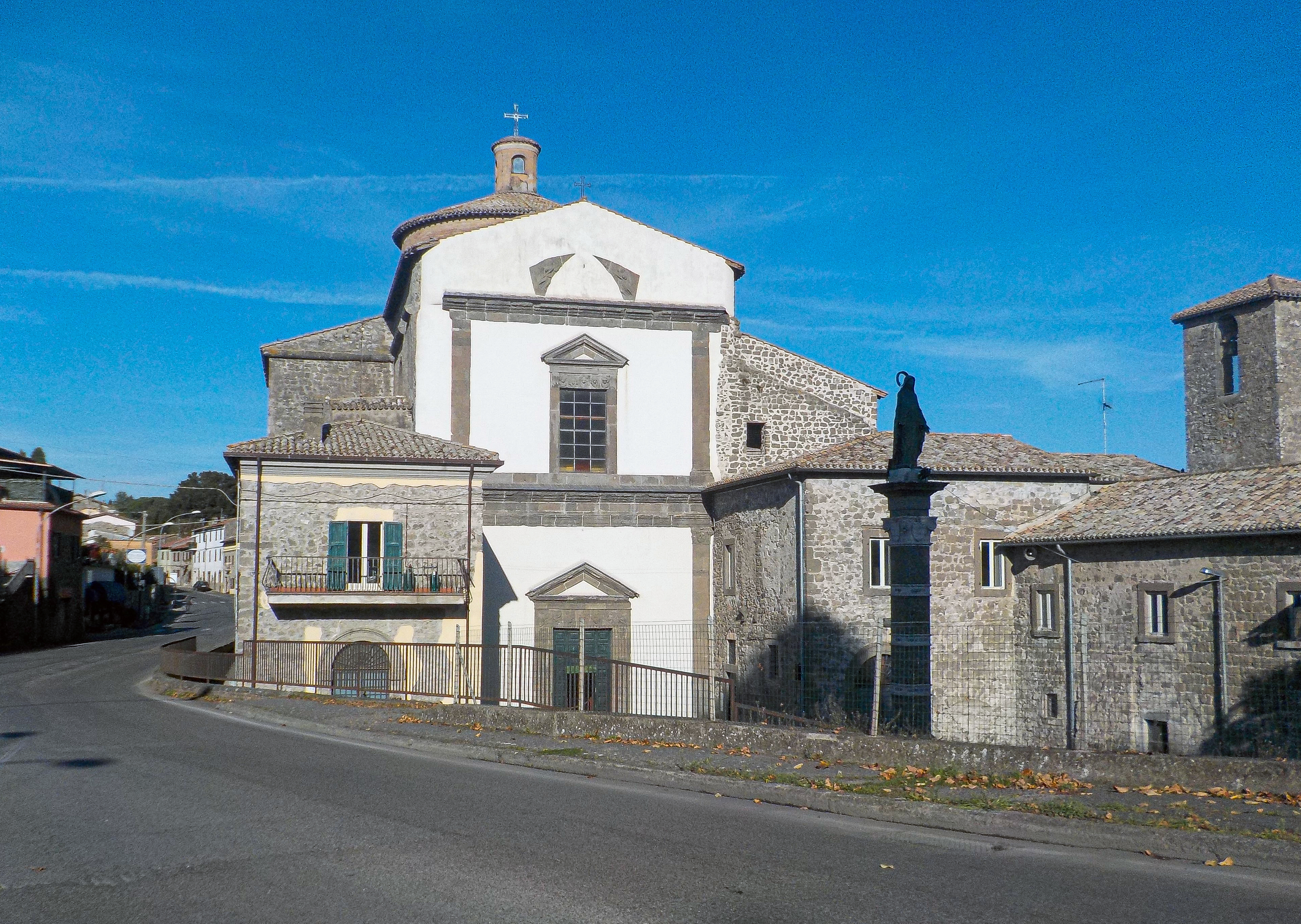
Santa Maria delle Grazie

The Sanctuary of the Madonna delle Grazie is a Roman Catholic church in Montefiascone, province of Viterbo, Lazio, Italy. It is located near the Basilica church of San Flaviano.

== History ==
The sanctuary was built in the 14th century, with the first documentation in 1333, when the community erected the adjacent hospital. In 1465 the church was affiliated with the Servite order. The church was rebuilt in 1492.
