= Montefiascone =

- Comune
- Comune di Montefiascone
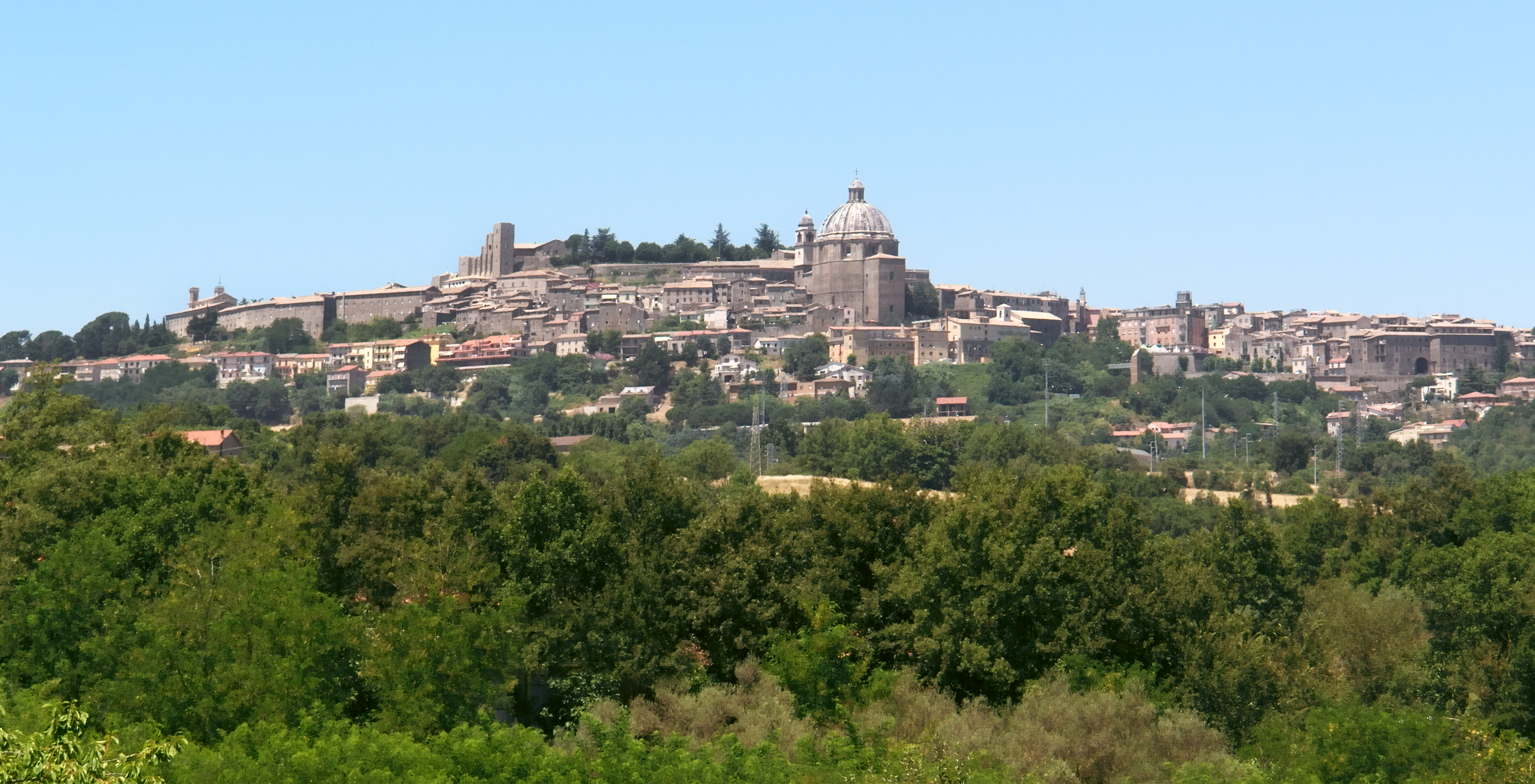

- Location within Italy Location within Lazio
- Coordinates: 42°32′25″N 12°02′13″E
- Country: Italy
- Region: Lazio
- Province: Viterbo (VT)
- Frazioni: Le Coste, Le Grazie, Le Mosse, Zepponami

Government
  - Mayor: Giulia De Santis

Area
  - Total: 104.93 km^{2} (40.51 sq mi)
- Elevation: 590 m (1,940 ft)

Population (30 November 2017)
  - Total: 13,520
  - Density: 128.8/km^{2} (333.7/sq mi)
- Demonym: Montefiasconesi or Falisci
- Time zone: UTC+1 (CET)
  - Summer (DST): UTC+2 (CEST)
- Postal code: 01027
- Dialing code: 0761
- Patron saint: St. Margaret of Antioch
- Saint day: July 20
- Website: Official website

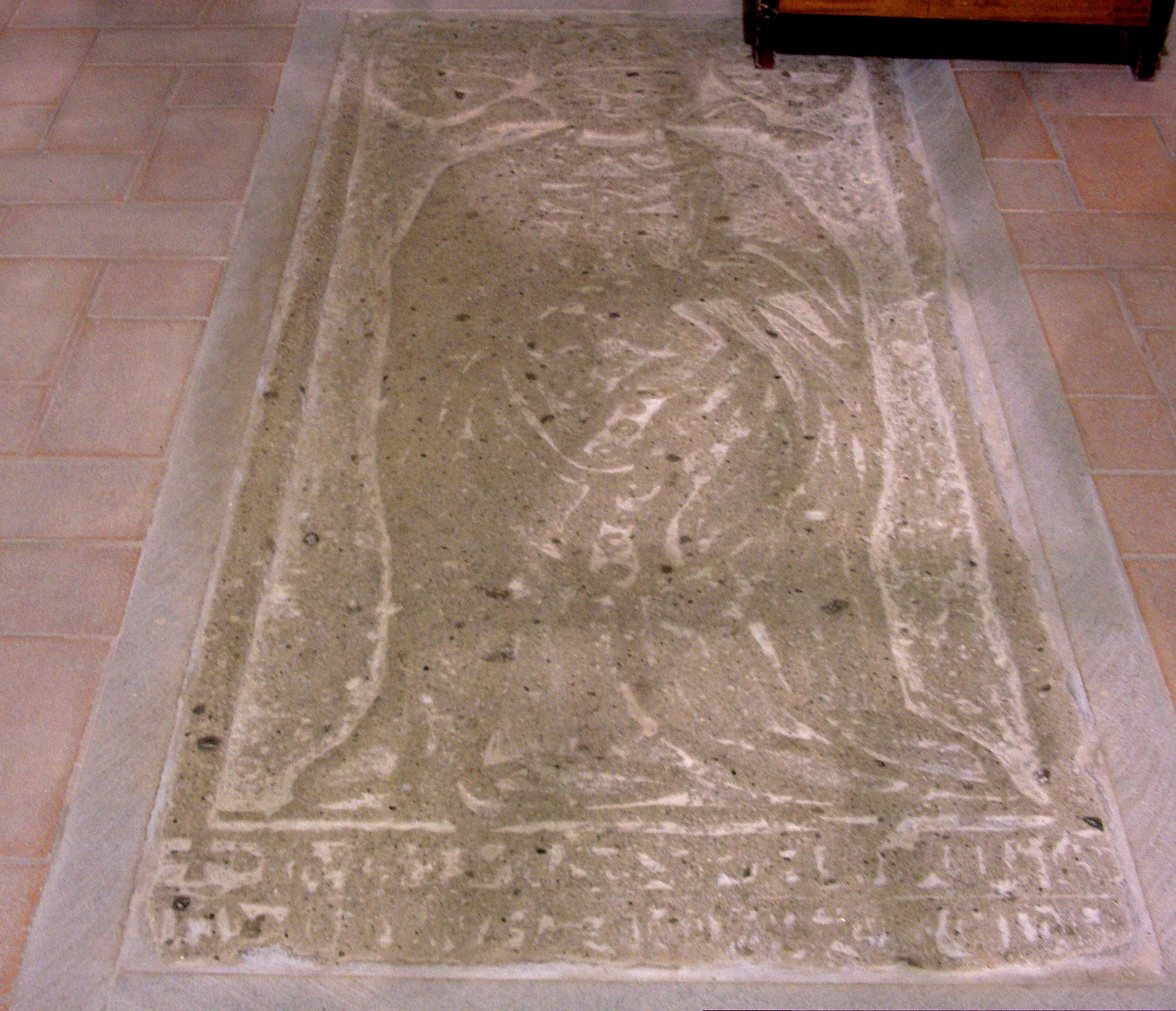
Grave of Bishop Fugger featured in the Est! Est!! Est!!! legend.

Montefiascone is a town and comune of the province of Viterbo, in Lazio, central Italy. It stands on a hill on the southeast side of Lake Bolsena, about 100 km (60 mi) north of Rome.

== History ==
The name of the city derives from that of the Falisci (Mons Faliscorum, "Mountain of the Falisci"). Later, it was controlled by the Etruscans. It was suggested that Montefiascone occupies the site of the Etruscan Temple called Fanum Voltumnae, at which the representatives of the twelve chief cities of Etruria met in the days of their independence. Under the Empire, the festival was held near Volsinii.

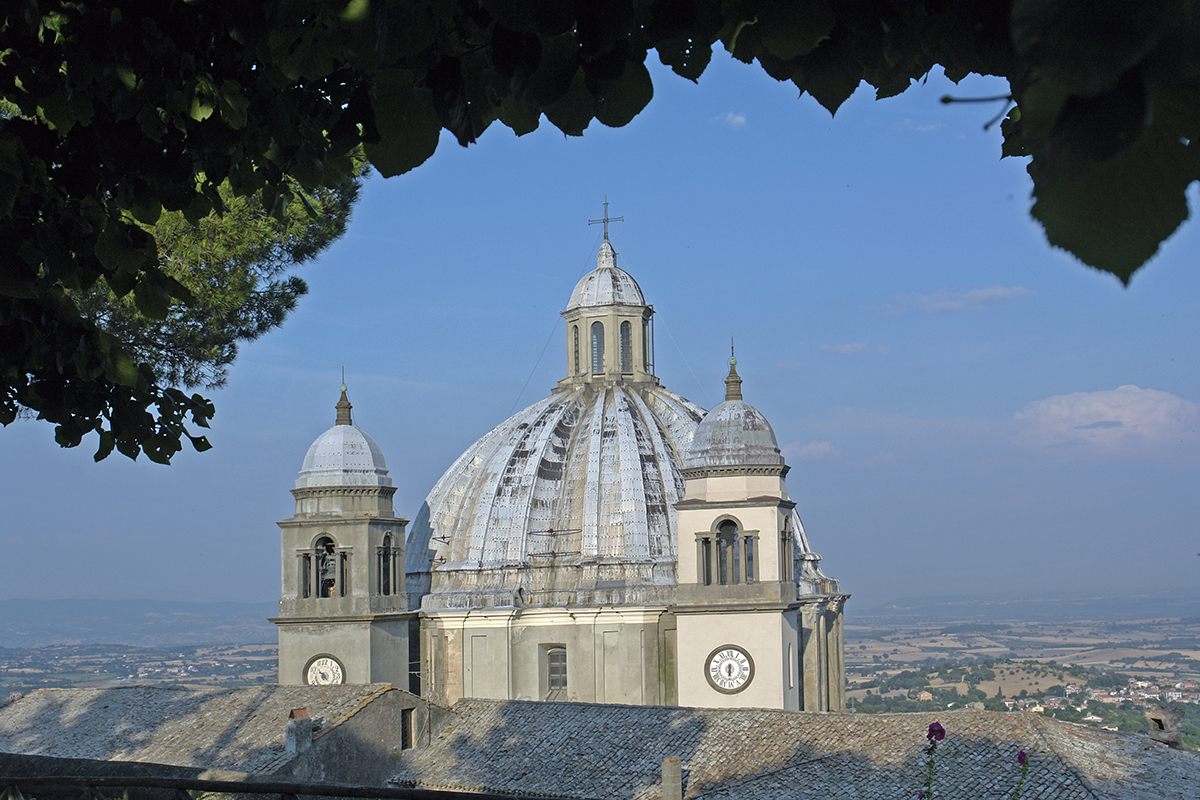
Cathedral of Montefiascone

The first documents mentioning Montefiascone are from 853 CE, when it belonged to the bishop of Tuscania. In 1058 and 1074 the Popes Stephen IX and Gregory VII, respectively, stopped here. In 1093 the fortress was besieged by Emperor Henry IV. The importance of the fortress was confirmed by Emperor Frederick Barbarossa's visit in 1185.

In the following two centuries, as a Papal possession, Montefiascone lived its period of highest splendour. The Castle was often residence of Popes, and was consequently enlarged and embellished. During Avignon Papacy, it was the main residence of the Papal legate Cardinal Albornoz. In 1463, however, it was already decaying, as in the words of by Pope Pius II. The decline increased after the plague of 1657 and the earthquake of 1697.

It became part of the new Kingdom of Italy in 1870. It was damaged by two Allied bombings in May 1944.

== Main sights ==
- Montefiascone Cathedral is one of the earliest structures by Michele Sanmicheli. Dedicated to Saint Margaret (Santa Margherita), the cathedral was a ruin in 1330 and took three centuries to rebuild. Subsequently, in 1670, it suffered a serious fire, with repairs taking a further decade. The interior was elaborately restored in 1893.
- Santa Maria delle Grazie: church also by Sanmicheli.
- San Flaviano: church built in 1032, repaired and enlarged in the Gothic style late in the 14th century, a curious double church of importance in the history of architecture; in its interior some 14th-century frescoes were discovered in 1896. In the crypt is the grave of a traveler who succumbed to excessive drinking of the local wine known as Est! Est!! Est!!! The story is that his valet, who preceded him, wrote "est" on the doors of all the inns where good wine was to be had, and that here the inscription was thrice repeated.
- Santa Maria di Montedoro: church
- Sant'Andrea
- Rocca dei Papi, formed by the remains of the old Papal summer residence. At the top of the hill it provides a view of Lago Bolsena.
- Falesco winery is located there.
