= Falesco =

Italian wine company

Coordinates: 42.6520447°N 12.2421854°E

Falesco is a winery and vineyard established in Montefiascone, Italy in 1979. It has been described as a "state-of-the-art winery" and its production facilities are now located in Montecchio. It's a family owned business, currently run by Riccardo Cotarella, his daughter Dominga, and his brother Renzo. Falesco contains 670 acres, 370 of which are vineyards. Annual production is almost 3 million bottles. The estate straddles the border of Lazio and Umbria, about 50 miles (80.5 km) north of Rome.

== Wines ==
Falesco does not utilize heavily planted, traditional Italian grape varieties such as Canaiolo and Trebbiano in its higher-quality wines. Although these varieties produce excellent yields, the winery maintains that the quality of the wines made from those varieties are not great. Breaking with Italian tradition, "they planted the best clones of Merlot available" to produce a wine they call "Montiano". Wine writer Lawrence Osborne has called Montiano a "globally significant wine."

The winery also produces a distinctive local white wine called Est! Est!! Est!!! di Montefiascone. This wine is made of "60 percent Trebbiano 30 percent Malvasia and 10 percent Roscetto", and is considered a "generic Umbrian cheap white known around the world."

They sell a white wine made from the roscetto grape is called "Ferentano".

Another of their offerings is a wine called Aleatico di Gradoli.

Falesco has two product lines based on terroir. The "Latium Line" comprises wines from Montefiascone in the Viterbo province in Latium, and the "Umbria line" comprises wines produced in the Montecchio and Orvieto area.
