= Santa Maria di Montedoro =

Church building in Montefiascone, Italy

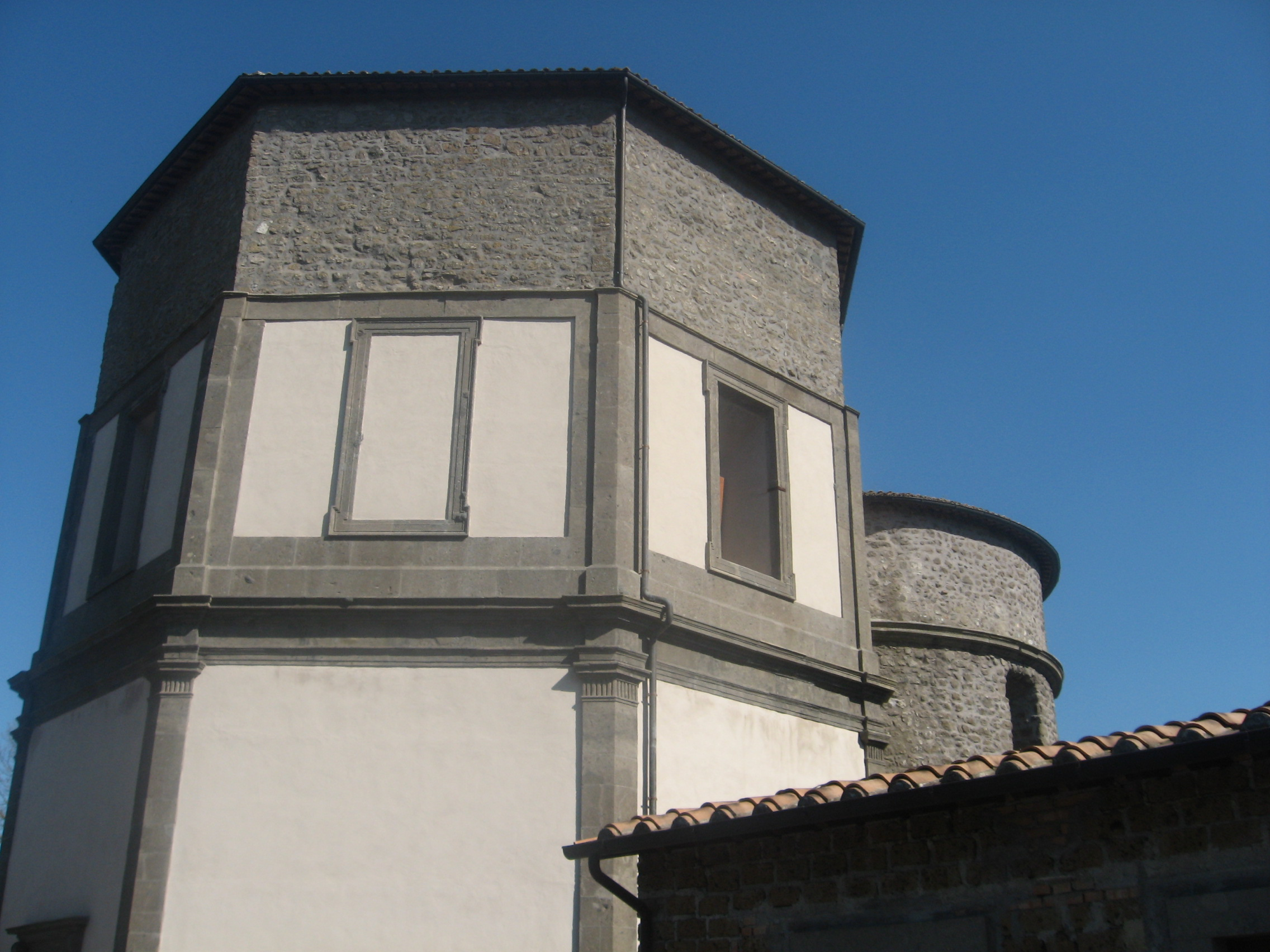
Santa Maria di Montedoro.

The Church of Santa Maria di Montedoro (anciently called Monte Moro) is a religious building in Montefiascone, central Italy, located at the foot of a hill, three kilometres from the city, on the Strada Verentana.

== History ==
Its plan was started by Antonio da Sangallo the Younger while he was busy in the restoration of the Palazzo Papale in Montefiascone, commissioned by Pope Leo X. The project of this church saw initially economical impediments because of a severe plague in 1523, and was later completed by architect Pietro Tartarino.

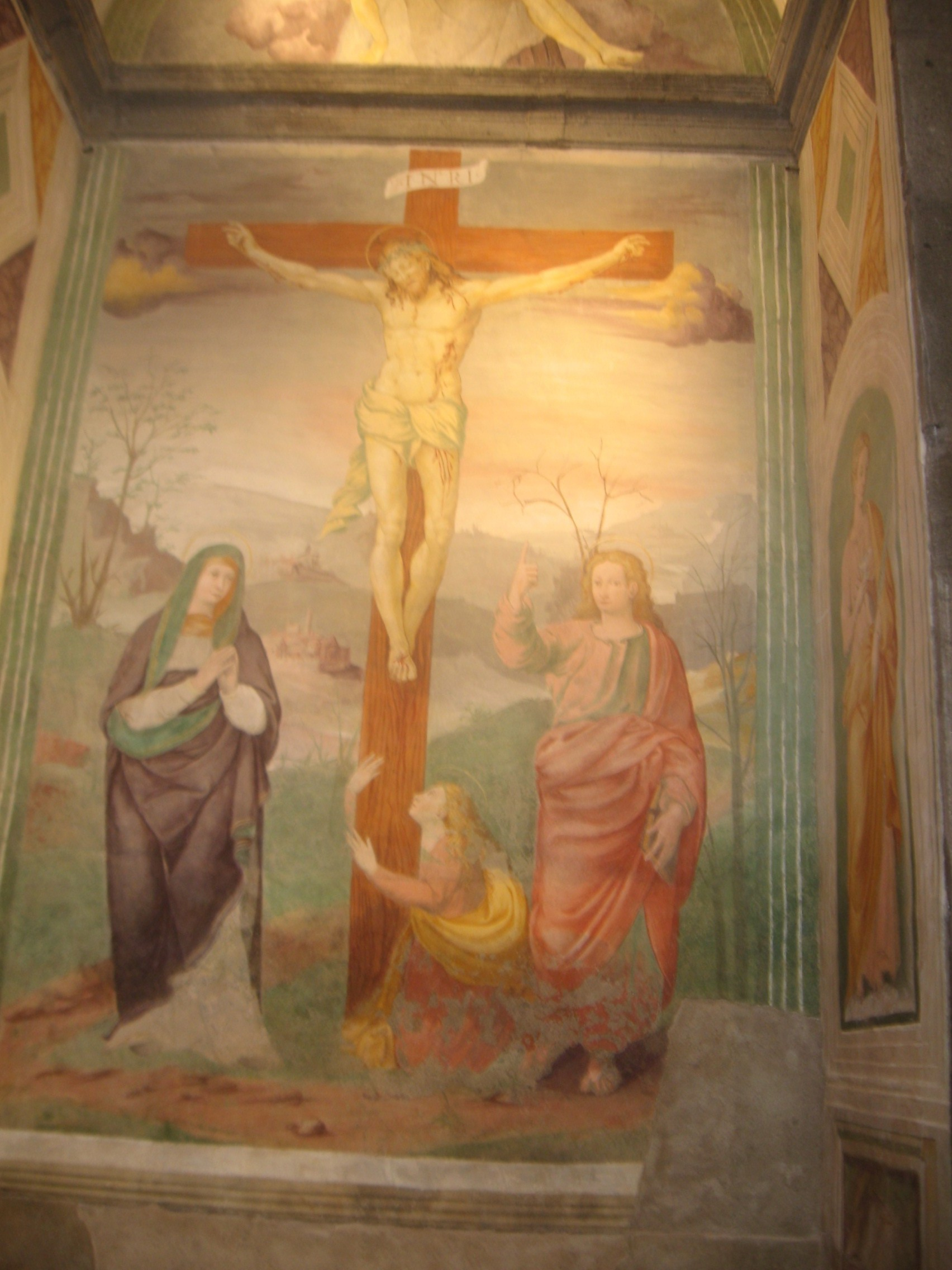
The Crucifixion.

== Description ==
It is an octagonal temple, joined to a semi-circular choir, 21 meters long. In the six corners of the octagon there are rectangular semicolumns with Doric capitals, above which is a beam of mouldings. In the middle of each side there are windows, some of which are closed. Above the windows is the tholobate; above it tholobate rises a rough wall that hides the small dome erected on the same tholobate.

The church can be accessed through two doors: the interior houses there are five chapels and the large semicircular chapel of the altar. The chapels have frescoes depicting the Crucifixion of Jesus, the Resurrection and the Madonna with Child.
