= Est! Est!! Est!!! di Montefiascone =

Italian wine region in Lazio

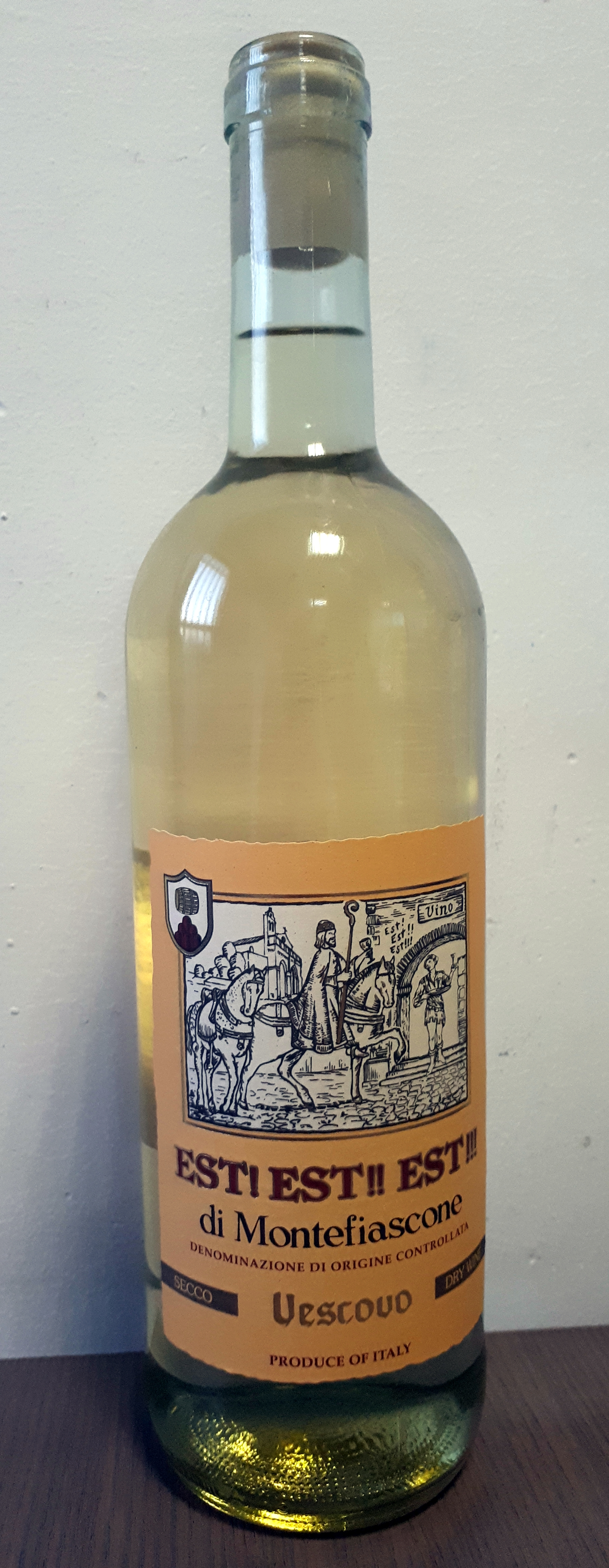
Wine from Est! Est!! Est!!! di Montefiascone

Est! Est!! Est!!! di Montefiascone (also known as just Est! Est!! Est!!!) is an Italian wine region centered on the commune of Montefiascone in the province of Viterbo in Lazio, Italy. Since 1966, the white Trebbiano and Malvasia bianca-based wines produced within the 1,000 acres (400 ha) of the region can qualify for Denominazione di origine controllata (DOC) designation under Italian wine laws.

The unusual name of the wine region comes from a tale about a 12th-century German bishop traveling to the Vatican for a meeting with the Pope. The bishop sent a prelate ahead of him to survey the villages along the route for the best wines. The "wine scout" had instructions to write "Est" (Latin for "It is" or "There is") on the doors or walls of inns with particularly good wines so the bishop would know where to stop. At a Montefiascone inn, the prelate was reportedly so overwhelmed with the local wine that he wrote "Est! Est!! Est!!!" on the door. While this tale has been widely repeated, with some variations (such as the event taking place in the 10th century and/or involving a Flemish bishop, attending the coronation of Henry V, Holy Roman Emperor instead of meeting the Pope, etc.), it is considered by many wine experts, such as Master of Wine Mary Ewing-Mulligan, to be apocryphal.

Today, the wine region is known primarily for wine tourism, catering to the visitors of Lake Bolsena north of Rome, with comparatively little Est! Est!! Est!!! di Montefiascone being exported. Among wine critics, the wine often receives mixed opinions with wine experts such as Hugh Johnson and Jancis Robinson describing in The World Atlas of Wine Est! Est!! Est!!! di Montefiascone as "usually the dullest white wine with the strangest name in the world." Wine writers Joe Bastianich and David Lynch compare Est! Est!! Est!!! di Montefiascone to the Tuscan wines from Vernaccia di San Gimignano saying that the region's "...history is more compelling than what's currently in the glass."

== Origins of the name ==
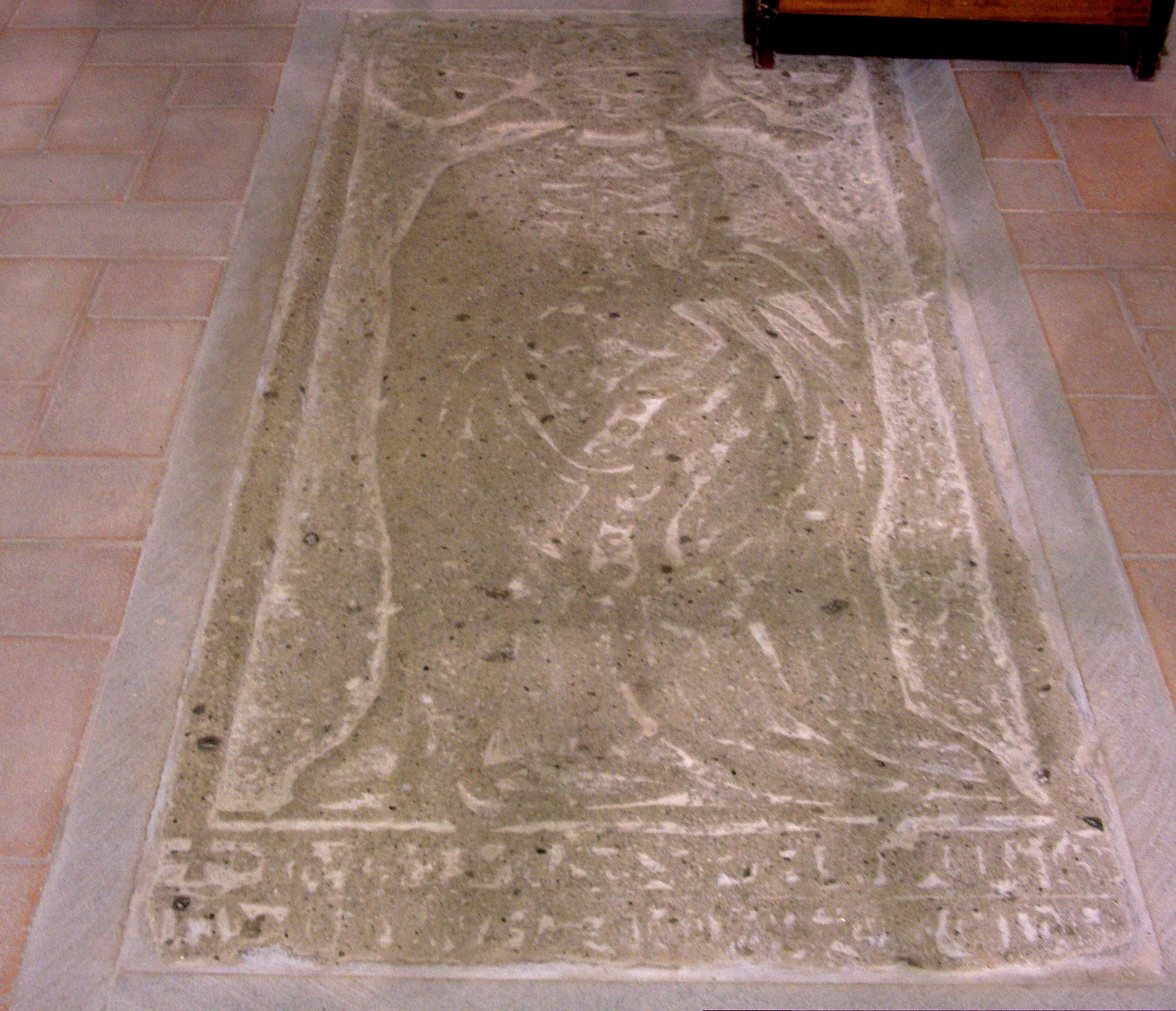
Grave of Bishop Johann Fugger in the village of Montefiascone.

The story behind the name of Est! Est!! Est!!! di Montefiascone has been widely repeated for centuries and, though likely apocryphal, has served as a tourism draw for the region and gives some notoriety to the wine.

Several variations of the basic tale exist. One of the more detailed retellings can be found in Tom Stevenson's Sotheby's Wine Encyclopedia, which pinpoints the event to late 1110 or early 1111, when a German bishop, Johann Fugger, was traveling to Rome for the coronation of Henry V as Holy Roman Emperor. On his travels, Fugger sent his majordomo ahead of him to taste the local wines and report which were bonum. As in other retellings, the majordomo documented his research by writing "Est" in chalk on the doors of establishments whose wines he enjoyed, and was so impressed with the wines of Montefiascone that he left the message "Est! Est!! Est!!!" But Stevenson also reports that the bishop himself was so impressed with the wines that he canceled the rest of his journey and stayed in Montefiascone until his death. Today, there is a tomb in a local church in Montefiascone believed to be the resting place of Bishop Fugger, which bears the Latin inscription: "Est est est - Propter nimium est - Johannes de Foucris - dominus meus - mortuus est".

== DOC regulations ==
The white blended wines of Est! Est!! Est!!! di Montefiascone received DOC status in 1966 and includes the volcanic soils encircling Lake Bolsena in the northern Latium region. According to DOC regulations (last changes approved on date 30-11-2011) the wine should come from grapes grown within the DOC area in the province of Viterbo and included in the administrative territory of the municipalities of Montefiascone, Bolsena, San Lorenzo Nuovo, Grotte di Castro, Gradoli, Capodimonte and Marta, harvested to a maximum yield of 13 tonnes/ha. The finished wine must have a minimum alcohol level of at least 11% and be composed of a blend of Trebbiano Toscano (known locally as Procanico) by a percentage between 50% and 65%, Malvasia bianca by a percentage between 10% and 20% and Trebbiano Giallo (known locally as Rosetto) by a percentage between 25% and 40%.

== Wine styles ==
Wine writer Joe Bastianich describes the wines of Est! Est!! Est!!! di Montefiascone as mildly aromatic with apple notes and high acidity. The wines can be produced in dry and sweeter abboccato styles. Locally, the wines are often paired with Roman cuisine such as fritto misto and deep-fried artichokes.

One major producer is Falesco. Their version has been called a "generic Umbrian (sic) cheap white known around the world".
