= Sant'Andrea, Montefiascone =

Church in Montefiascone, Italy

Chiesa di Sant’Andrea in Montefiascone
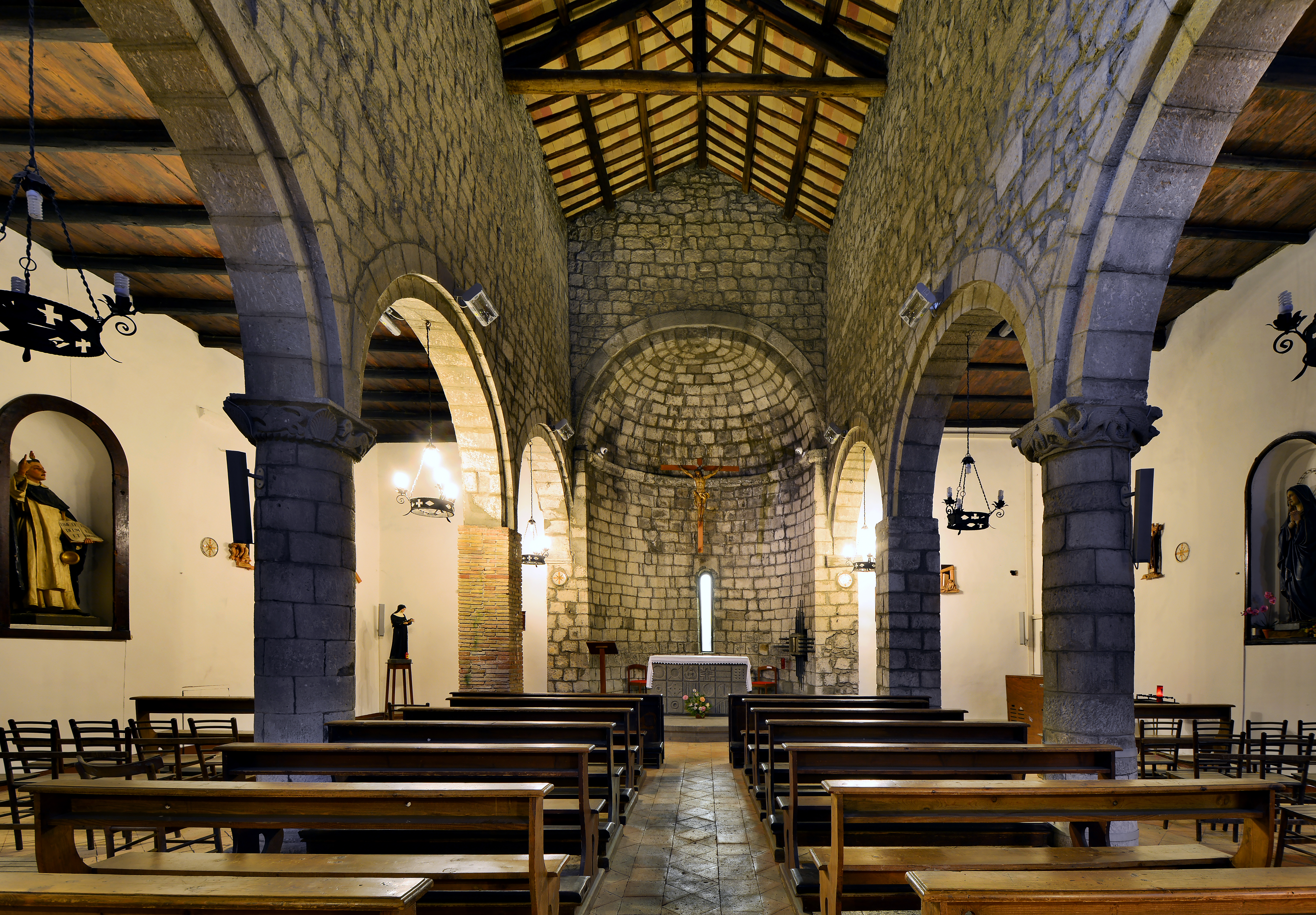
- Interior view of the church

Religion
- Province: Viterbo
- Region: Lazio
- Patron: Andrew the Apostle

Location
- Location: Montefiascone, Viterbo, Italy
- State: Italy
- Interactive map of Chiesa di Sant’Andrea in Montefiascone
- Territory: Montefiascone
- Coordinates: 42°32′11″N 12°01′50″E

Architecture
- Completed: before 853

Sant'Andrea in Campo is a Romanesque style, Roman Catholic church in Montefiascone, province of Viterbo, Italy.

== History ==
The church is mentioned in documents from the year 853 as a church in Campo or in a rural location. The church while narrow and later within the town walls, had three naves. The portal and internal columns are Romanesque.
