= Vertumnus =

Roman god of the seasons

- God of seasons, change, gardens, fruit trees, and plant growth
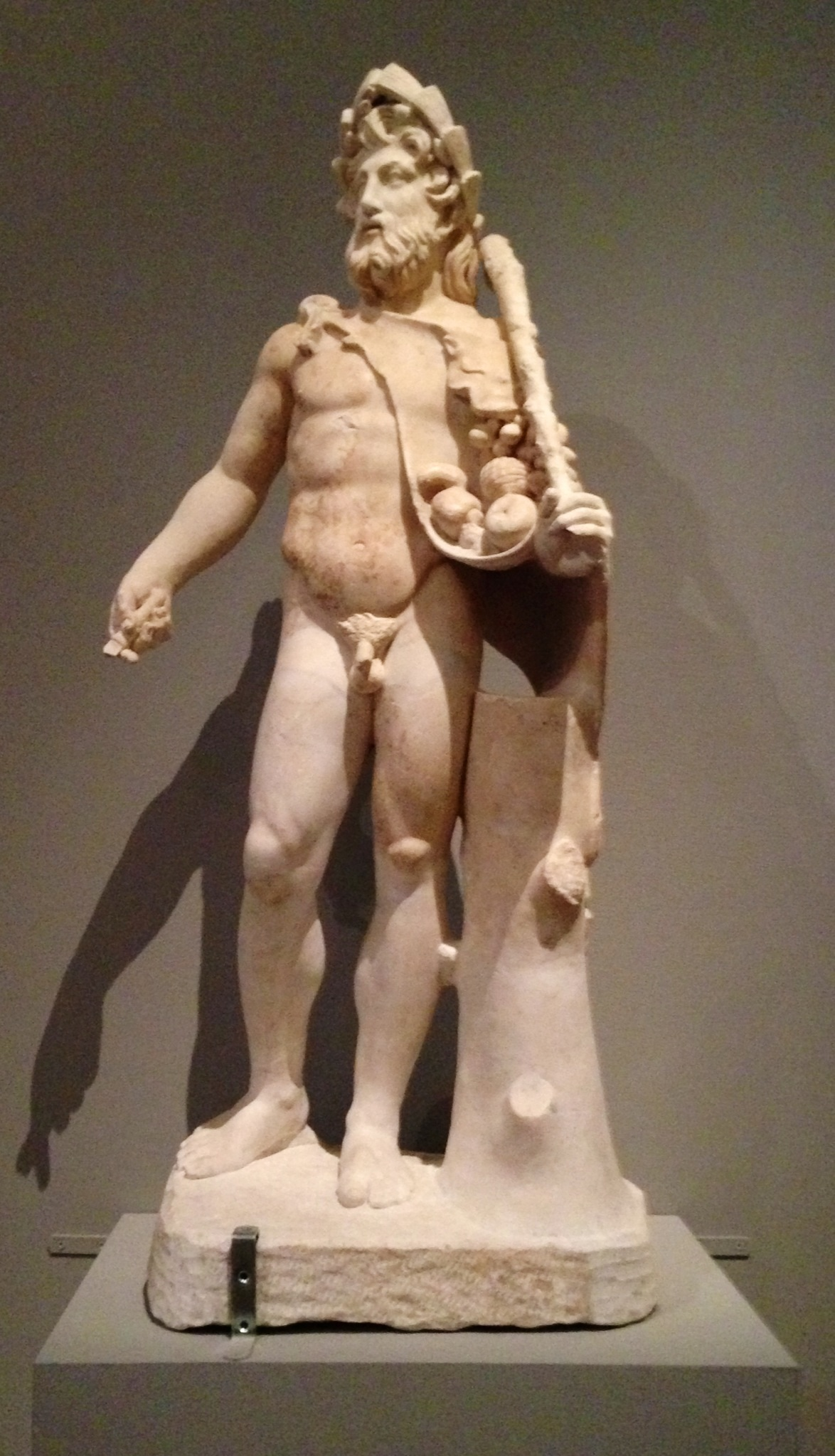
- Statue of the 1st or 2nd centuries AD.
- Symbols: gardening tools
- Festivals: Vertumnalia
- Consort: Pomona

Equivalents
- Etruscan: Voltumna

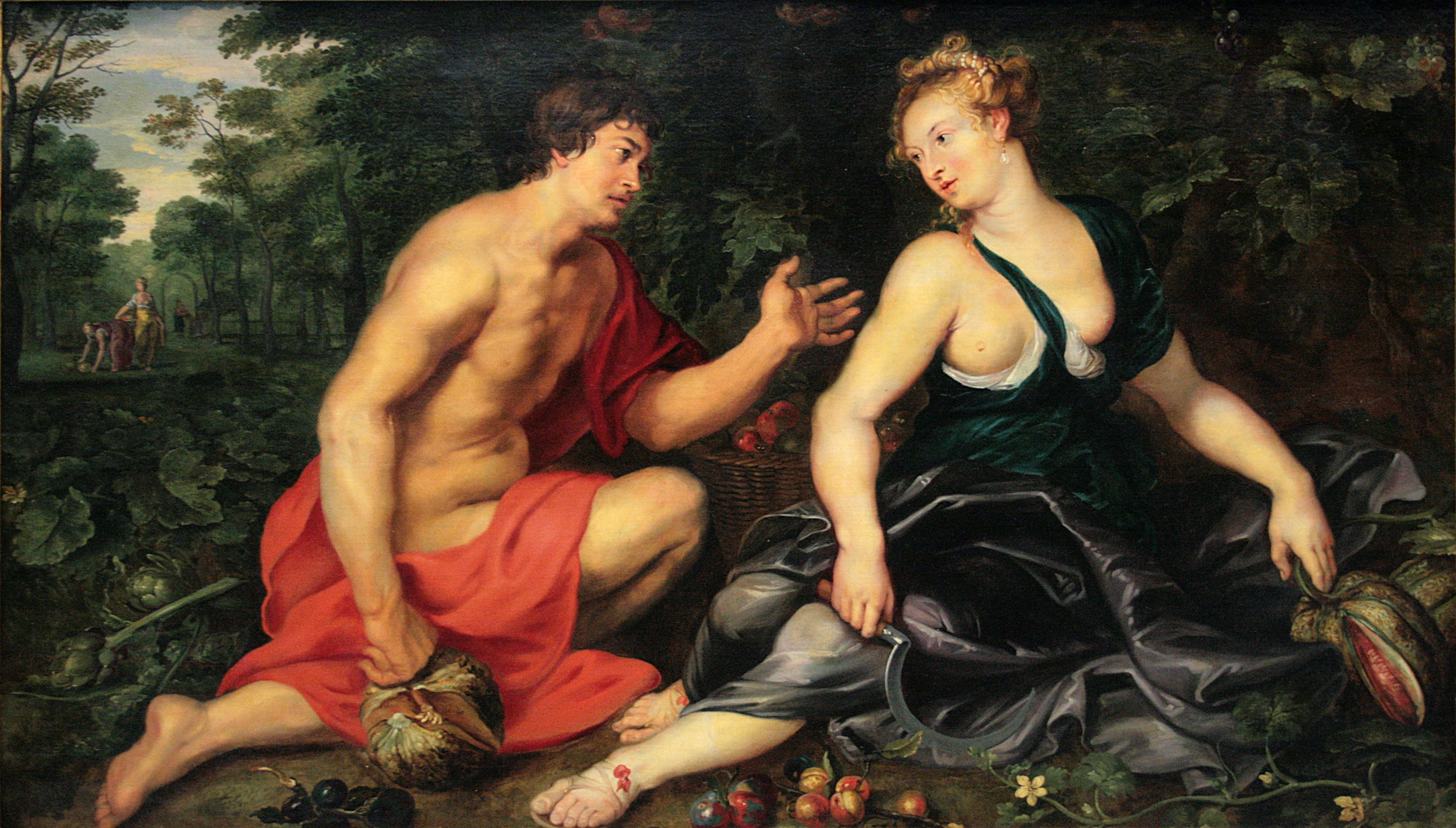
Vertumnus and Pomona (c. 1618) by Peter Paul Rubens

In Roman mythology, Vertumnus (Latin pronunciation: [wɛr'tʊmnʊs]; also Vortumnus or Vertimnus) is the god of seasons, change, and plant growth, as well as gardens and fruit trees. He could change his form at will; using this power, according to Ovid's Metamorphoses (xiv), he tricked Pomona into talking to him by disguising himself as an old woman and gaining entry to her orchard, then using a narrative warning of the dangers of rejecting a suitor (the embedded tale of Iphis and Anaxarete) to seduce her. The tale of Vertumnus and Pomona has been called "the first exclusively Latin tale."

Vertumnus's festival was called the Vertumnalia and was held 13 August.

== Cult and origin ==
The name Vortumnus most likely derives from Etruscan Voltumna. Its formation in Latin was probably influenced by the Latin verb vertere meaning "to change", hence the alternative form Vertumnus. Ancient etymologies were based on often superficial similarities of sound rather than the principles of modern scientific linguistics, but reflect ancient interpretations of a deity's function. In writing about the Festival of Vesta in his poem on the Roman calendar, Ovid recalls a time when the forum was still a reedy swamp and "that god, Vertumnus, whose name fits many forms, / Wasn’t yet so-called from damming back the river" (averso amne).

Varro was convinced that Vortumnus was Etruscan, and a major god. Vertumnus's cult arrived in Rome around 300 BC, and a temple to him was constructed on the Aventine Hill by 264 BC, the date when Volsinii (Etruscan Velzna) fell to the Romans. Propertius, the major literary source for the god, also asserts that the god was Etruscan, and came from Volsinii.

Propertius refers to a bronze statue of Vortumnus made by the legendary Mamurius Veturius, who was also credited with the twelve ritual shields (ancilia) of Mars's priests, known as the Salii. The bronze statue replaced an ancient maple statue (xoanon) supposed to have been brought to Rome in the time of Romulus. The statue of Vortumnus (signum Vortumni) stood in a simple shrine located at the Vicus Tuscus near the Forum Romanum, and was decorated according to the changing seasons. In his poem about the god, Propertius has the statue of Vortumnus speak in first-person as if to a passer-by.

The base of the statue was discovered in 1549, perhaps still in situ, but has since been lost. An inscription commemorated a restoration to the statue under Diocletian and Maximian in the early 4th century AD.

== Reception ==
The subject of Vertumnus and Pomona appealed to European sculptors and painters of the 16th through the 18th centuries, providing a disguised erotic subtext in a scenario that contrasted youthful female beauty with an aged crone. In narrating the tale in the Metamorphoses, Ovid had observed that the kind of kisses given by Vertumnus were never given by an old woman: "so Circe's smile conceals a wicked intention, and Vertumnus's hot kisses ill suit an old woman's disguise".

The subject was even woven into tapestry in series with the generic theme Loves of the Gods, of which the mid-16th-century Brussels tapestry at Museu Calouste Gulbenkian, Lisbon, woven to cartoons attributed to Jan Vermeyen, must be among the earliest. François Boucher provided designs for the tapestry-weaver Maurice Jacques at the Gobelins tapestry manufactory for a series that included Vertumnus and Pomona (1775–1778). A similar theme of erotic disguise is found with Jupiter wooing Callisto in the guise of Diana, an example of which is at the J. Paul Getty Museum.

Mme de Pompadour, who sang well and danced gracefully, played the role of Pomone in a pastoral presented to a small audience at Versailles; the sculpture by Jean-Baptiste Lemoyne (1760) alludes to the event.

Camille Claudel sculpted a sensual marble version of "Vertumnus and Pomona" in 1905 (Musée Rodin, Paris).

Joseph Brodsky wrote a poem about Vertumnus.

David Littlefield finds in the episode a movement from rape to mutual desire, effected against an orderly, "civilised" Latian landscape.

Conversely, Roxanne Gentilcore reads in its diction and narrative strategies images of deception, veiled threat and seduction, in which Pomona, the tamed hamadryad now embodying the orchard, does not have a voice.

== Gallery ==
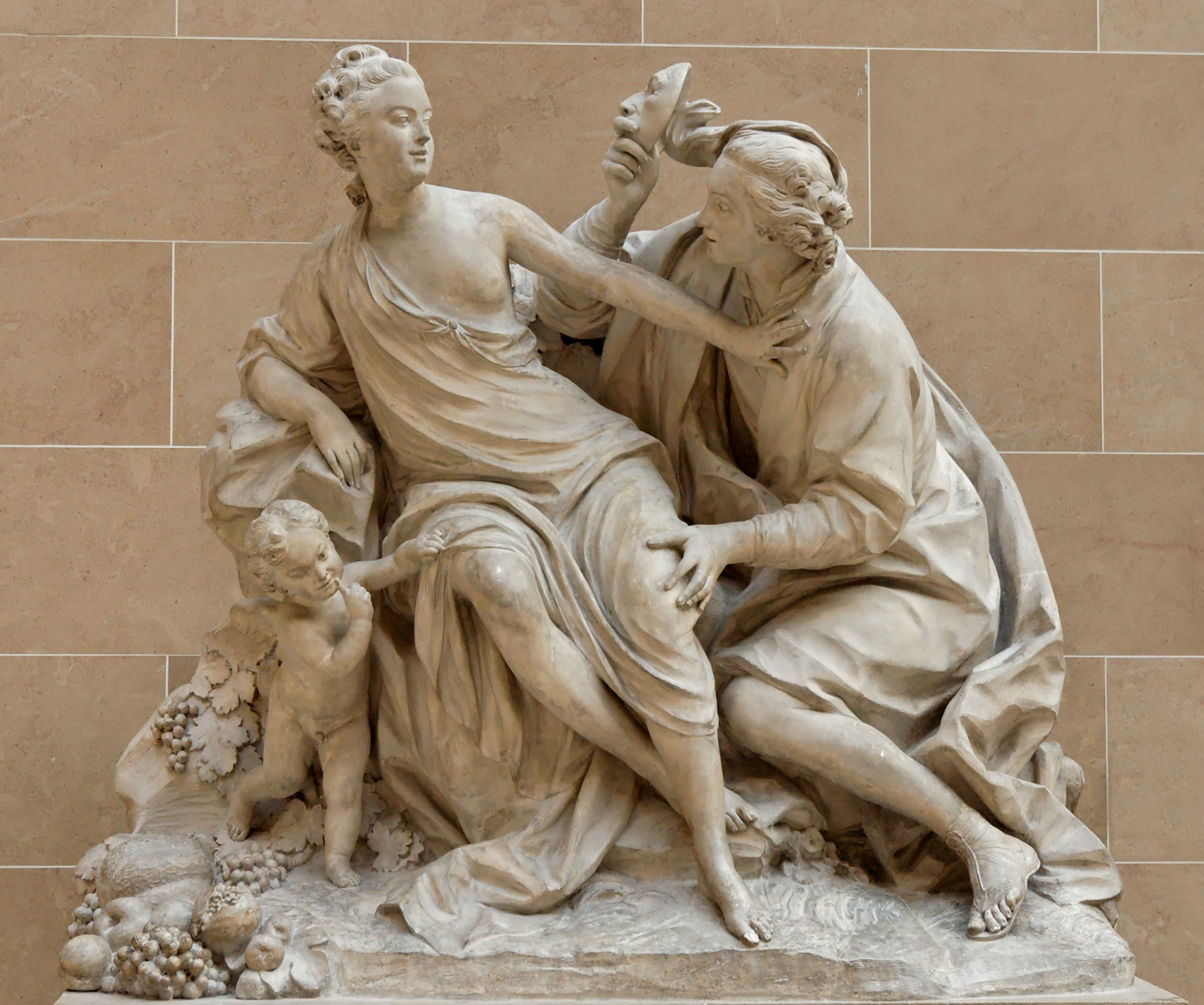
A rococo Vertumne et Pomone (1760) by Jean-Baptiste Lemoyne

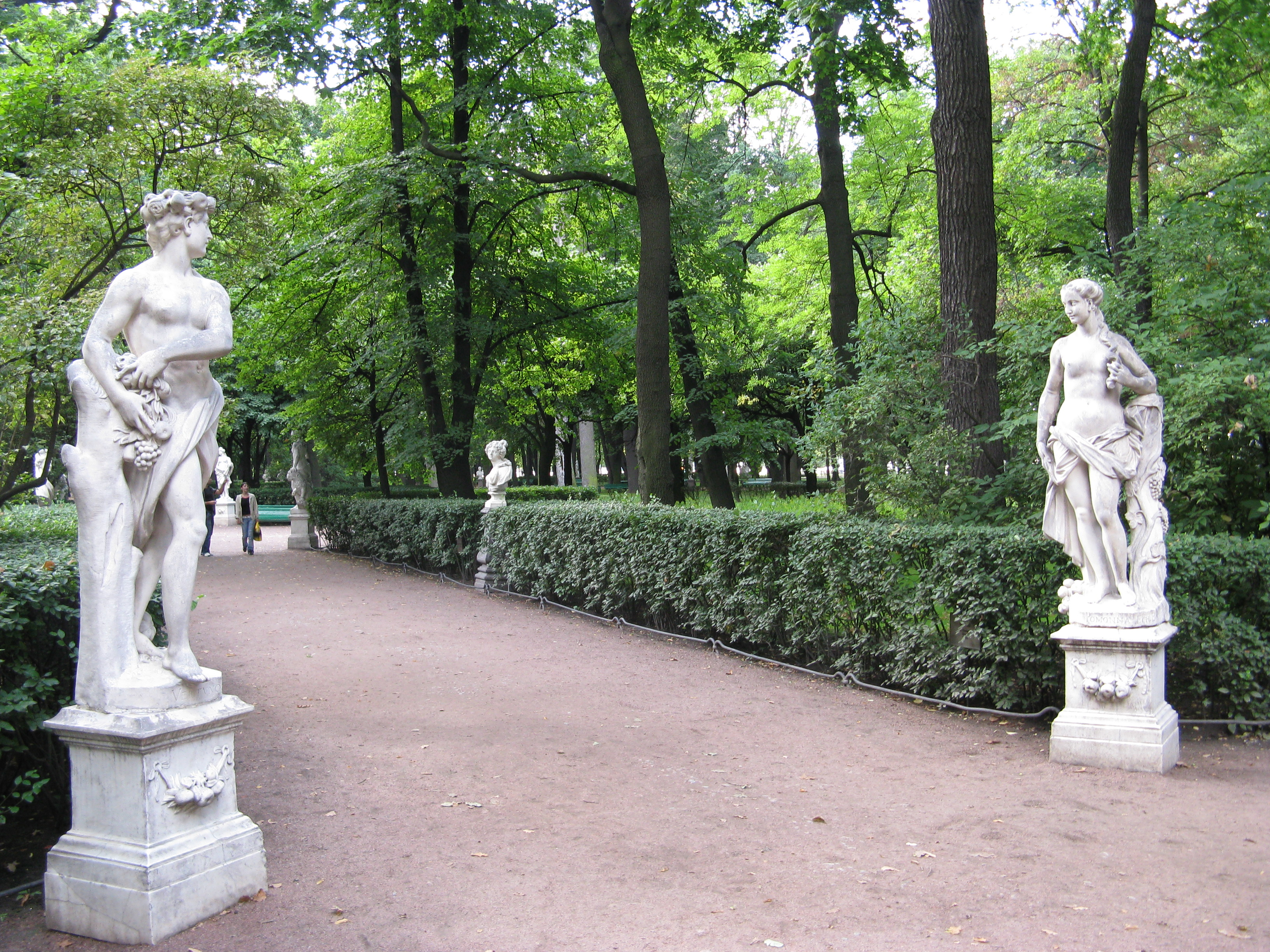
Vertumnus and Pomona (1717) by Francesco Penso, in an allée of the Summer Garden, St. Petersburg

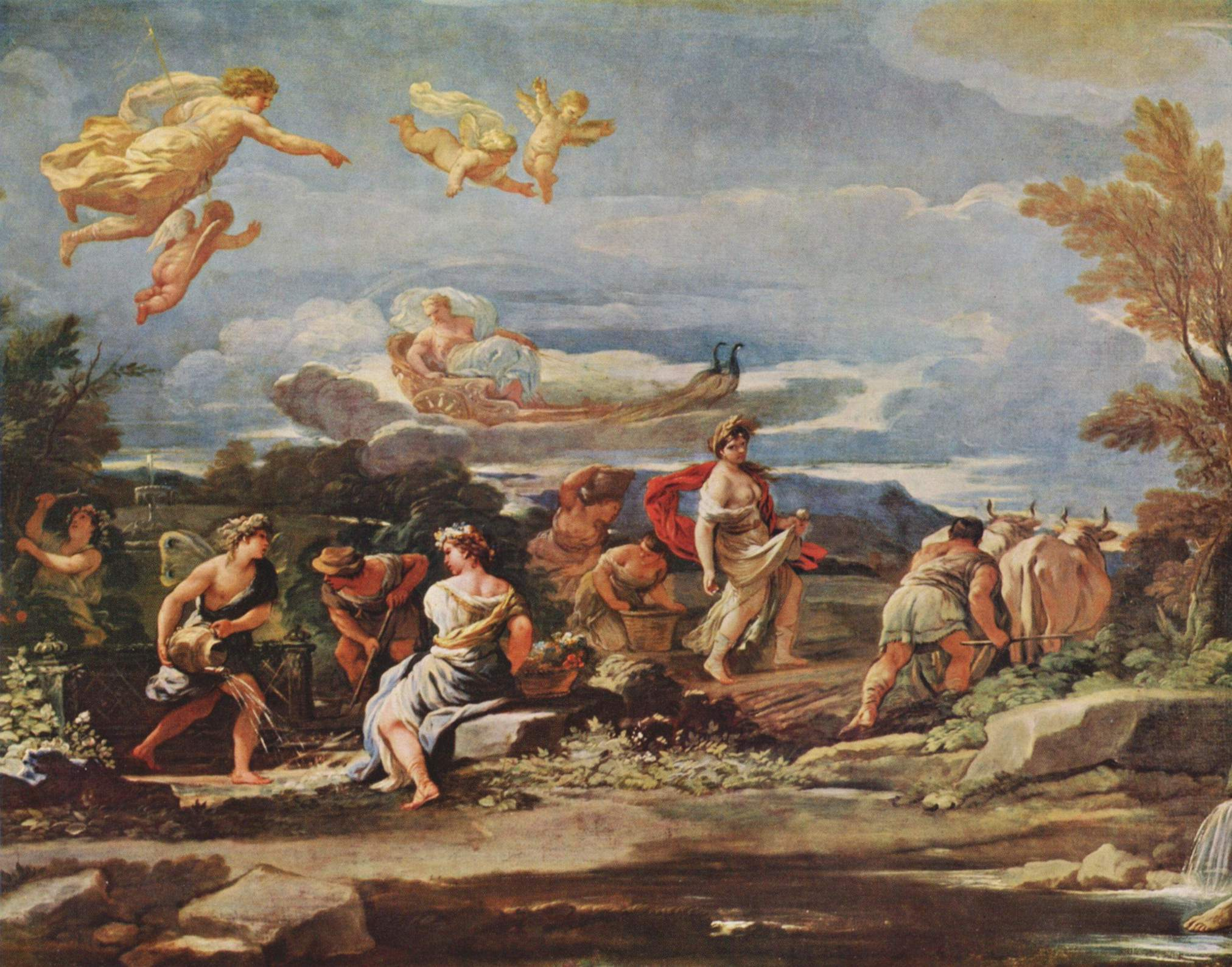
Vertumnus and Pomona (1682–1683) by Luca Giordano

The painting Vertumnus (c. 1590) by Giuseppe Arcimboldo depicts Rudolf II as Vertumnus
