= San Flaviano, Montefiascone =

Church in Montefiascone, Italy

Coordinates: 42.5409°N 12.0355°E

San Flaviano is a Romanesque style, Roman Catholic church in Montefiascone, in the province of Viterbo, Lazio, Italy.

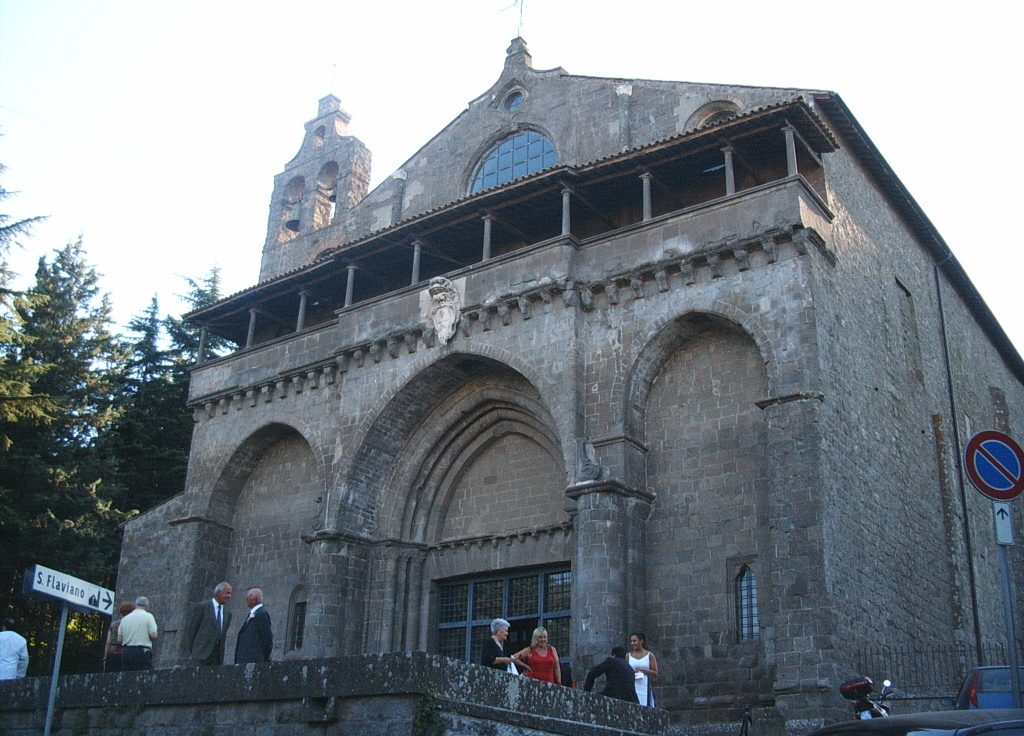
San Flaviano church, Montefiascone

== History ==
The stone façade from 1252 (773 years ago) has three different size arches, and is surmounted by a roofed balcony. The lower church we see today was erected on an older building in the 11th-century. The church was dedicated to the early Byzantine martyr Flaviano. The structure has a lower and upper church.

The lower church has columns with capitals carved with animal and vegetable motifs. The walls and chapels contain numerous frescoes. A twelfth century fresco of Christ Pantocrator is found on the lower apse, above a depiction of Saint Flaviano martyr on horseback. The right wall of the apse has an Annuciation (1575); the left, a Baptism of Christ. In the left nave is a Deposition. On the right nave is a Massacre of the Innocents, a crucifixion and a St Sebastian. Over the entrance vault is a Triumph of Death, and on the counter-façade is a Life of St Catherine.

In the crypt is the grave of Giovanni Fugger, a pilgrim who died in town. His tomb has the inscription Est Est Est pr nim est hic Jo De Fuk do meus mortuus est Legend holds that his valet would let his owner know where the wine was excellent by writing Est! on the establishments with good wine. It is said Fugger died in Montefiascone because the white wine was so prized. A local wine label takes its name from such legend.

The upper church interiors was partially refurbished in the 18th century under the patronage of Cardinal Pompeo Aldovrandi. He commissioned a canvas by Giuseppe Antonio Ghedini, depicting the Martyrdom of St Flaviano (1740) for one of the chapels.
