= Glossary of ancient Roman religion =

The vocabulary of ancient Roman religion was highly specialized. Its study affords important information about the religion, traditions and beliefs of the ancient Romans. This legacy is conspicuous in European cultural history in its influence on later juridical and religious vocabulary in Europe, particularly of the Christian Church. This glossary provides explanations of concepts as they were expressed in Latin pertaining to religious practices and beliefs, with links to articles on major topics such as priesthoods, forms of divination, and rituals.

For theonyms, or the names and epithets of gods, see List of Roman deities. For public religious holidays, see Roman festivals. For temples see the List of Ancient Roman temples. Individual landmarks of religious topography in ancient Rome are not included in this list; see Roman temple.

== Glossary ==
=== A ===
==== abominari ====
The verb abominari ("to avert an omen", from ab-, "away, off," and ominari, "to pronounce on an omen") was a term of augury for an action that rejects or averts an unfavourable omen indicated by a signum, "sign". The noun is abominatio, from which English "abomination" derives. At the taking of formally solicited auspices (auspicia impetrativa), the observer was required to acknowledge any potentially bad sign occurring within the templum he was observing, regardless of the interpretation. He might, however, take certain actions in order to ignore the signa, including avoiding the sight of them, and interpreting them as favourable. The latter tactic required promptness, wit and skill based on discipline and learning. Thus the omen had no validity apart from the observation of it.

==== aedes ====
The aedes was the dwelling place of a god. It was thus a structure that housed the deity's image, distinguished from the templum or sacred district. Aedes is one of several Latin words that can be translated as "shrine" or "temple"; see also delubrum and fanum. For instance, the Temple of Vesta, as it is called in English, was in Latin an aedes. See also the diminutive aedicula, a small shrine.

Ruins of the aedes of Vesta

In his work On Architecture, Vitruvius always uses the word templum in the technical sense of a space defined through augury, with aedes the usual word for the building itself. The design of a deity's aedes, he writes, should be appropriate to the characteristics of the deity. For a celestial deity such as Jupiter, Coelus, Sol or Luna, the building should be open to the sky; an aedes for a god embodying virtus (valour), such as Minerva, Mars, or Hercules, should be Doric and without frills; the Corinthian order is suited for goddesses such as Venus, Flora, Proserpina and the Lymphae; and the Ionic is a middle ground between the two for Juno, Diana, and Father Liber. Thus in theory, though not always in practice, architectural aesthetics had a theological dimension.

The word aedilis (aedile), a public official, is related by etymology; among the duties of the aediles was the overseeing of public works, including the building and maintenance of temples. The temple (aedes) of Flora, for instance, was built in 241 BC by two aediles acting on Sibylline oracles. The plebeian aediles had their headquarters at the aedes of Ceres.

==== ager ====
In religious usage, ager (territory, country, land, region) was terrestrial space defined for the purposes of augury in relation to auspicia. There were five kinds of ager: Romanus, Gabinus, peregrinus, hosticus and incertus. The ager Romanus originally included the urban space outside the pomerium and the surrounding countryside. According to Varro, the ager Gabinus pertained to the special circumstances of the oppidum of Gabii, which was the first to sign a sacred treaty (pax) with Rome. The ager peregrinus was other territory that had been brought under treaty (pacatus). Ager hosticus meant foreign territory; incertus, "uncertain" or "undetermined," that is, not falling into one of the four defined categories. The powers and actions of magistrates were based on and constrained by the nature of the ager on which they stood, and ager in more general usage meant a territory as defined legally or politically. The ager Romanus could not be extended outside Italy (terra Italia).

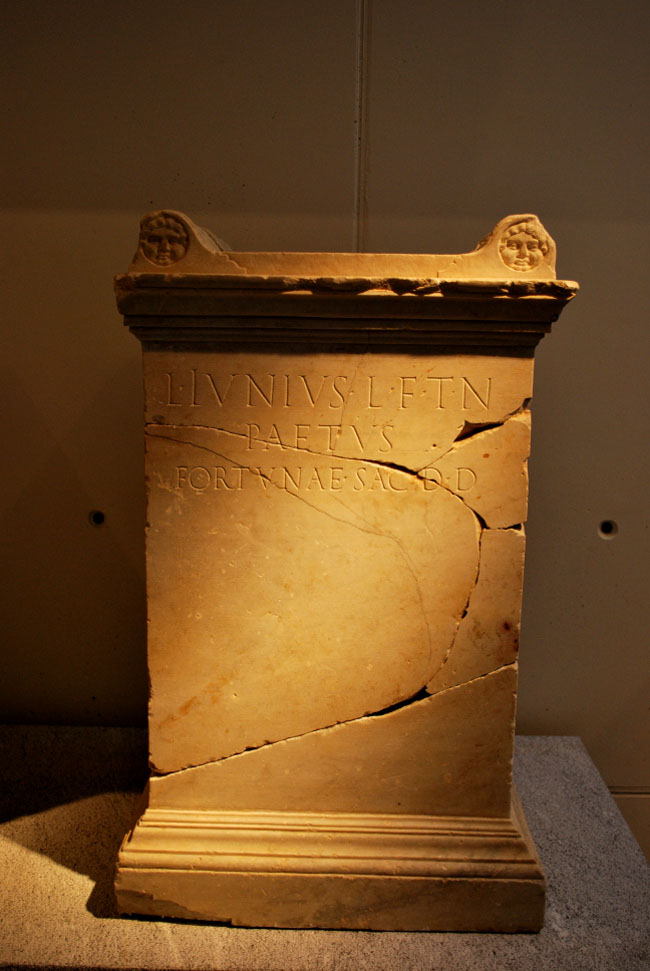
Altar (ara) from Roman Spain

==== ara ====
The focal point of sacrifice was the altar (ara, plural arae). Most altars throughout the city of Rome and in the countryside would have been simple, open-air structures; they may have been located within a sacred precinct (templum), but often without an aedes housing a cult image. An altar that received food offerings might also be called a mensa, "table."

Perhaps the best-known Roman altar is the elaborate and Greek-influenced Ara Pacis, which has been called "the most representative work of Augustan art." Other major public altars included the Ara Maxima.

==== arbor felix ====
Some trees were felix and others infelix. A tree (arbor) was categorized as felix if it was under the protection of the heavenly gods (di superi). The adjective felix here means not only literally "fruitful" but more broadly "auspicious". Macrobius lists arbores felices (plural) as the oak (four species thereof), the birch, the hazelnut, the sorbus, the white fig, the pear, the apple, the grape, the plum, the cornus and the lotus. The oak was sacred to Jupiter, and twigs of oak were used by the Vestals to ignite the sacred fire in March every year. Also among the felices were the olive tree, a twig of which was affixed to the hat of the Flamen Dialis, and the laurel and the poplar, which crowned the Salian priests.

Arbores infelices were those under the protection of chthonic gods or those gods who had the power of turning away misfortune (avertentium). As listed by Tarquitius Priscus in his lost ostentarium on trees, these were buckthorn, red cornel, fern, black fig, "those that bear a black berry and black fruit," holly, woodland pear, butcher's broom, briar, and brambles."

==== attrectare ====
The verb attrectare ("to touch, handle, lay hands on") referred in specialized religious usage to touching sacred objects while performing cultic actions. Attrectare had a positive meaning only in reference to the actions of the sacerdotes populi Romani ("priests of the Roman people"). It had the negative meaning of "contaminate" (= contaminare) or pollute when referring to the handling of sacred objects by those not authorized, ordained, or ritually purified.

==== augur ====
An augur (Latin plural augures) was an official and priest who solicited and interpreted the will of the gods regarding a proposed action. The augur ritually defined a templum, or sacred space, declared the purpose of his consultation, offered sacrifice, and observed the signs that were sent in return, particularly the actions and flight of birds. If the augur received unfavourable signs, he could suspend, postpone or cancel the undertaking (obnuntiatio). "Taking the auspices" was an important part of all major official business, including inaugurations, senatorial debates, legislation, elections and war, and was held to be an ancient prerogative of Regal and patrician magistrates. Under the Republic, this right was extended to other magistrates. After 300 BC, plebeians could become augurs.

==== auguraculum ====
The solicitation of formal auspices required the marking out of ritual space (auguraculum) from within which the augurs observed the templum, including the construction of an augural tent or hut (tabernaculum). There were three such sites in Rome: on the citadel (arx), on the Quirinal Hill, and on the Palatine Hill. Festus said that originally the auguraculum was in fact the arx. It faced east, situating the north on the augur's left or lucky side. A magistrate who was serving as a military commander also took daily auspices, and thus a part of camp-building while on campaign was the creation of a tabernaculum augurale. This augural tent was the center of religious and legal proceedings within the camp.

==== augurium ====
Augurium (plural auguria) is an abstract noun that pertains to the augur. It seems to mean variously: the "sacral investiture" of the augur; the ritual acts and actions of the augurs; augural law (ius augurale); and recorded signs whose meaning had already been established. The word is rooted in the IE stem *aug-, "to increase," and possibly an archaic Latin neuter noun *augus, meaning "that which is full of mystic force." As the sign that manifests the divine will, the augurium for a magistrate was valid for a year; a priest's, for his lifetime; for a temple, it was perpetual.

The distinction between augurium and auspicium is often unclear. Auspicia is the observation of birds as signs of divine will, a practice held to have been established by Romulus, first king of Rome, while the institution of augury was attributed to his successor Numa. For Servius, an augurium is the same thing as auspicia impetrativa, a body of signs sought through prescribed ritual means. Some scholars think auspicia would belong more broadly to the magistracies and the patres while the augurium would be limited to the rex sacrorum and the major priesthoods.

Ancient sources record three auguria: the augurium salutis in which every year the gods were asked whether it was fas (permissible, right) to ask for the safety of the Roman people (August 5); the augurium canarium, a dog sacrifice (see also supplicia canum) to promote the maturation of grain crops, held in the presence of the pontiffs as well as the augurs "when ears of wheat have already formed but are still in the sheaths"; and the vernisera auguria mentioned by Festus, which should have been a springtime propitiary rite held at the time of the harvest (auguria messalia).

==== auspex ====
The auspex, plural auspices, is a diviner who reads omens from the observed flight of birds (avi-, from avis, "bird", with -spex, "observer", from spicere). See auspicia following and auspice.

==== auspicia ====
The auspicia (au- = avis, "bird"; -spic-, "watch") were originally signs derived from observing the flight of birds within the templum of the sky. Auspices are taken by an augur. Originally they were the prerogative of the patricians, but the college of augurs was opened to plebeians in 300 BC. Only magistrates were in possession of the auspicia publica, with the right and duty to take the auspices pertaining to the Roman state. Favorable auspices marked a time or location as auspicious, and were required for important ceremonies or events, including elections, military campaigns and pitched battles.

According to Festus, there were five kinds of auspicia to which augurs paid heed: ex caelo, celestial signs such as thunder and lightning; ex avibus, signs offered by birds; ex tripudiis, signs produced by the actions of certain sacred chickens; ex quadrupedibus, signs from the behavior of four-legged animals; and ex diris, threatening portents. In official state augury at Rome, only the auspicia ex caelo and ex avibus were employed.

The taking of the auspices required ritual silence (silentium). Watching for auspices was called spectio or servare de caelo. The appearance of expected signs resulted in nuntiatio, or if they were unfavourable obnuntiatio. If unfavourable auspices were observed, the business at hand was stopped by the official observer, who declared alio die ("on another day").

The practice of observing bird omens was common to many ancient peoples predating and contemporaneous with Rome, including the Greeks, Celts, and Germans.

==== auspicia impetrativa ====
Auspicia impetrativa were signs that were solicited under highly regulated ritual conditions (see spectio and servare de caelo) within the templum. The type of auspices required for convening public assemblies were impetrativa, and magistrates had the "right and duty" to seek these omens actively. These auspices could only be sought from an auguraculum, a ritually constructed augural tent or "tabernacle" (tabernaculum). Contrast auspicia oblativa.

==== auspicia maiora ====
The right of observing the "greater auspices" was conferred on a Roman magistrate holding imperium, perhaps by a Lex curiata de imperio, although scholars are not agreed on the finer points of law. A censor had auspicia maxima. It is also thought that the flamines maiores were distinguished from the minores by their right to take the auspicia maiora; see Flamen.

==== auspicia oblativa ====
Signs that occurred without deliberately being sought through formal augural procedure were auspicia oblativa. These unsolicited signs were regarded as sent by a deity or deities to express either approval or disapproval for a particular undertaking. The prodigy (prodigium) was one form of unfavourable oblativa. Contrast auspicia impetrativa.

==== auspicia privata ====
Private and domestic religion was linked to divine signs as state religion was. It was customary in patrician families to take the auspices for any matter of consequence such as marriages, travel, and important business. The scant information about auspicia privata in ancient authors suggests that the taking of private auspices was not different in essence from that of public auspices: absolute silence was required, and the person taking the auspices could ignore unfavourable or disruptive events by feigning not to have perceived them. In matters pertaining to the family or individual, both lightning and exta (entrails) might yield signs for privati, private citizens not authorized to take official auspices. Among his other duties, the Pontifex Maximus advised privati as well as the official priests about prodigies and their forestalling. By the time of Cicero, the taking of private auspices was falling into disuse.

==== averruncare ====
In pontifical usage, the verb averruncare, "to avert," denotes a ritual action aimed at averting a misfortune intimated by an omen. Bad omens (portentaque prodigiaque mala) are to be burnt, using trees that are in the tutelage of underworld or "averting" gods (see arbores infelices above). Varro says that the god who presides over the action of averting is Averruncus.

=== B ===
==== bellum iustum ====
A "just war" was a war considered justifiable by the principles of fetial law (ius fetiale). Because war could bring about religious pollution, it was in itself nefas, "wrong," and could incur the wrath of gods unless iustum, "just". The requirements for a just war were both formal and substantive. As a formal matter, the war had to be declared according to the procedures of the ius fetiale. On substantive grounds, a war required a "just cause," which might include rerum repetitio, retaliation against another people for pillaging, or a breach of or unilateral recession from a treaty; or necessity, as in the case of repelling an invasion. See also Jus ad bellum.

=== C ===
==== caerimonia ====
The English word "ceremony" derives from the Latin caerimonia or caeremonia, a word of obscure etymology first found in literature and inscriptions from the time of Cicero (mid-1st century BC), but thought to be of much greater antiquity. Its meaning varied over time. Cicero used caerimonia at least 40 times, in three or four different senses: "inviolability" or "sanctity", a usage also of Tacitus; "punctilious veneration", in company with cura (carefulness, concern); more commonly in the plural caerimoniae, to mean "ritual prescriptions" or "ritual acts." The plural form is endorsed by Roman grammarians.

Hendrik Wagenvoort maintained that caerimoniae were originally the secret ritual instructions laid down by Numa, which are described as statae et sollemnes, "established and solemn." These were interpreted and supervised by the College of Pontiffs, flamens, rex sacrorum and the Vestals. Later, caerimoniae might refer also to other rituals, including foreign cults. These prescribed rites "unite the inner subject with the external religious object", binding human and divine realms. The historian Valerius Maximus makes clear that the caerimoniae require those performing them to attain a particular mental-spiritual state (animus, "intention"), and emphasizes the importance of caerimoniae in the dedication and first sentence of his work. In Valerius's version of the Gallic siege of Rome, the Vestals and the Flamen Quirinalis rescue Rome's sacred objects (sacra) by taking them to Caere; thus preserved, the rites take their name from the place. Although this etymology makes a meaningful narrative connection for Valerius, it is unlikely to be correct in terms of modern scientific linguistics. An Etruscan origin has sometimes been proposed. Wagenvoort thought that caerimonia derived from caerus, "dark" in the sense of "hidden", hence meaning "darknesses, secrets."

In his Etymologiae, Isidore of Seville says that the Greek equivalent is orgia, but derives the word from carendo, "lacking", and says that some think caerimoniae should be used of Jewish observances, specifically the dietary law that requires abstaining from or "lacking" certain foods.

==== calator ====
The calatores were assistants who carried out day-to-day business on behalf of the senior priests of the state such as the flamines maiores. A calator was a public slave. Festus derives the word from the Greek verb kalein, "to call."

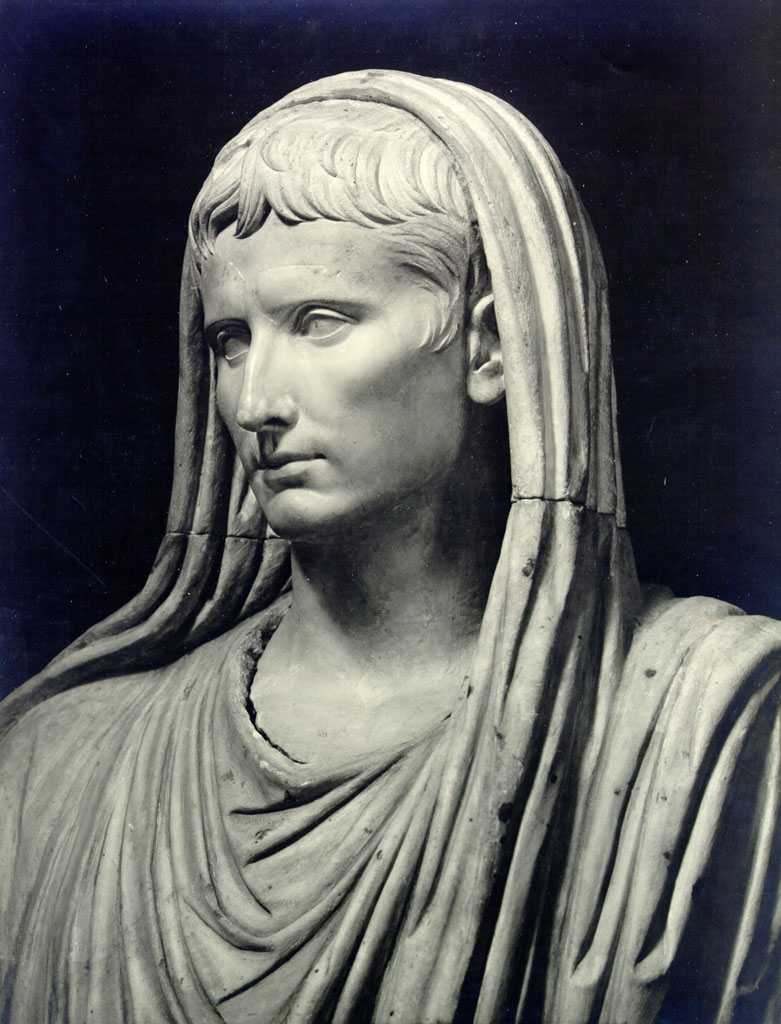
Augustus, capite velato

==== capite velato ====
At the traditional public rituals of ancient Rome, officiants prayed, sacrificed, offered libations, and practiced augury capite velato, "with the head covered" by a fold of the toga drawn up from the back. This covering of the head is a distinctive feature of Roman rite in contrast with Etruscan practice or ritus graecus, "Greek rite." In Roman art, the covered head is a symbol of pietas and the individual's status as a pontifex, augur or other priest.

It has been argued that the Roman expression of piety capite velato influenced Paul's prohibition against Christian men praying with covered heads: "Any man who prays or prophesies with his head covered dishonors his head."

==== carmen ====
In classical Latin, carmen usually means "song, poem, ode." In magico-religious usage, a carmen (plural carmina) is a chant, hymn, spell, or charm. In essence "a verbal utterance sung for ritualistic purposes", the carmen is characterized by formulaic expression, redundancy, and rhythm. Fragments from two archaic priestly hymns are preserved, the Carmen Arvale of the Arval Brethren and the Carmina Saliaria of the Salii. The Carmen Saeculare of Horace, though self-consciously literary in technique, was also a hymn, performed by a chorus at the Saecular Games of 17 BC and expressing the Apollonian ideology of Augustus.

A carmen malum or maleficum is a potentially harmful magic spell. A fragment of the Twelve Tables reading si malum carmen incantassit ("if anyone should chant an evil spell") shows that it was a longstanding concern of Roman law to suppress malevolent magic. A carmen sepulchrale is a spell that evokes the dead from their tombs; a carmen veneficum, a "poisonous" charm. Through magical practice, the word carmen comes to mean also the object on which a spell is inscribed, hence a charm in the physical sense.

==== castus, castitas ====
Castus is an adjective meaning morally pure or guiltless (English "chaste"), hence pious or ritually pure in a religious sense. Castitas is the abstract noun. Various etymologies have been proposed, among them two IE stems: *k'(e)stos meaning "he who conforms to the prescriptions of rite"; or *kas-, from which derives the verb careo, "I defice, am deprived of, have none..." i.e. vitia. In Roman religion, the purity of ritual and those who perform it is paramount: one who is correctly cleansed and castus in religious preparation and performance is likely to please the gods. Ritual error is a pollutant; it vitiates the performance and risks the gods' anger. Castus and castitas are attributes of the sacerdos (priest), but substances and objects can also be ritually castus.

==== cinctus Gabinus ====
The cinctus Gabinus ("Gabine cinch") was a way of wearing the toga thought to have originated in the Latin town of Gabii. It was also later claimed to have been part of Etruscan priestly dress. The cinch allowed free use of both arms, essential when the toga was still worn during combat and later important in some religious contexts, particularly those involving use of the toga to cover the head (capite velato). The style's ancient martial associations caused it to be worn during Roman declarations of war. It was also used by the priest or official charged with guiding the plow creating the sulcus primigenius during the rituals attending the foundation of new colonies. In Latin, cinctus Gabinus could refer to the cinch itself or to the entire toga thus worn. In religious contexts, such a toga was also said to be worn ritu Gabino ("in the Gabine rite").

==== clavum figere ====
Clavo trabali figere ("to fasten or fix with a beam (large) nail") was an expression that referred to the fixing or clinching of a matter. A nail was one of the attributes of the goddess Necessitas and of the Etruscan goddess Athrpa (Greek Atropos). According to Livy, every year in the temple of Nortia, the Etruscan counterpart of Fortuna, a nail was driven in to mark the time. In Rome, the senior magistrate on the Ides of September drove a nail called the clavus annalis ("year-nail") into the wall of the Temple of Jupiter Optimus Maximus. The ceremony occurred on the dies natalis ("birthday" or anniversary of dedication) of the temple, when a banquet for Jupiter (Epulum Jovis) was also held. The nail-driving ceremony, however, took place in a templum devoted to Minerva, on the right side of the aedes of Jupiter, because the concept of "number" was invented by Minerva and the ritual predated the common use of written letters.

The importance of this ritual is lost in obscurity, but in the early Republic it is associated with the appointment of a dictator clavi figendi causa, "dictator for the purpose of driving the nail," one of whom was appointed for the years 363, 331, 313, and 263 BC. Livy attributes this practice to religio, religious scruple or obligation. It may be that in addition to an annual ritual, there was a "fixing" during times of pestilence or civil discord that served as a piaculum. Livy says that in 363, a plague had been ravaging Rome for two years. It was recalled that a plague had once been broken when a dictator drove a ritual nail, and the senate appointed one for that purpose. The ritual of "driving the nail" was among those revived and reformed by Augustus, who in 1 AD transferred it to the new Temple of Mars Ultor. Henceforth a censor fixed the nail at the end of his term.

==== collegium ====
A collegium ("joined by law"), plural collegia, was any association with a legal personality. The priestly colleges oversaw religious traditions, and until 300 BC only patricians were eligible for membership. When plebeians began to be admitted, the size of the colleges was expanded. By the Late Republic, three collegia wielded greater authority than the others, with a fourth coming to prominence during the reign of Augustus. The four great religious corporations (quattuor amplissima collegia) were:

- Pontifices, the College of Pontiffs headed by the Pontifex Maximus;
- Augures;
- Quindecimviri sacris faciundis, the fifteen priests in charge of the Sibylline Books;
- Septemviri epulonum, the board of seven priests who organized public banquets for religious holidays.

Augustus was a member of all four collegia, but limited membership for any other senator to one.

In Roman society, a collegium might also be a trade guild or neighborhood association; see Collegium (ancient Rome).

==== comitia calata ====
The comitia calata ("calate assemblies") were non-voting assemblies (comitia) called for religious purposes. The verb calare, originally meaning "to call," was a technical term of pontifical usage, found also in calendae (Calends) and calator. According to Aulus Gellius, these comitia were held in the presence of the college of pontiffs in order to inaugurate the rex (the king in the Regal Period or the rex sacrorum in the Republic) or the flamines. The pontifex maximus auspiciated and presided; assemblies over which annually elected magistrates presided are never calata, nor are meetings for secular purposes or other elections even with a pontiff presiding.

The comitia calata were organized by curiae or centuriae. The people were summoned to comitia calata to witness the reading of wills, or the oath by which sacra were renounced (detestatio sacrorum). They took no active role and were only present to observe as witnesses.

Mommsen thought the calendar abbreviation QRCF, given once as Q. Rex C. F. and taken as Quando Rex Comitiavit Fas, designated a day when it was religiously permissible for the rex to "call" for a comitium, hence the comitia calata.

==== commentarii augurales ====
The Commentaries of the Augurs were written collections probably of the decreta and responsa of the college of augurs. Some scholarship, however, maintains that the commentarii were precisely not the decreta and responsa. The commentaries are to be distinguished from the augurs' libri reconditi, texts not for public use. The books are mentioned by Cicero, Festus, and Servius Danielis. Livy includes several examples of the augurs' decreta and responsa in his history, presumably taken from the commentarii.

==== commentarii pontificum ====
The Commentaries of the Pontiffs contained a record of decrees and official proceedings of the College of Pontiffs. Priestly literature was one of the earliest written forms of Latin prose, and included rosters, acts (acta), and chronicles kept by the various collegia, as well as religious procedure. It was often occultum genus litterarum, an arcane form of literature to which by definition only priests had access. The commentarii, however, may have been available for public consultation, at least by senators, because the rulings on points of law might be cited as precedent. The public nature of the commentarii is asserted by Jerzy Linderski in contrast to libri reconditi, the secret priestly books.

The commentarii survive only through quotation or references in ancient authors. These records are not readily distinguishable from the libri pontificales; some scholars maintain that the terms commentarii and libri for the pontifical writings are interchangeable. Those who make a distinction hold that the libri were the secret archive containing rules and precepts of the ius sacrum (holy law), texts of spoken formulae, and instructions on how to perform ritual acts, while the commentarii were the responsa (opinions and arguments) and decreta (binding explications of doctrine) that were available for consultation. Whether or not the terms can be used to distinguish two types of material, the priestly documents would have been divided into those reserved for internal use by the priests themselves, and those that served as reference works on matters external to the college. Collectively, these titles would have comprised all matters of pontifical law, ritual, and cult maintenance, along with prayer formularies and temple statutes. See also libri pontificales and libri augurales.

==== coniectura ====
Coniectura is the reasoned but speculative interpretation of signs presented unexpectedly, that is, of novae res, "novel information." These "new signs" are omens or portents not previously observed, or not observed under the particular set of circumstances at hand. Coniectura is thus the kind of interpretation used for ostenta and portenta as constituting one branch of the "Etruscan discipline"; contrast observatio as applied to the interpretation of fulgura (thunder and lightning) and exta (entrails). It was considered an ars, a "method" or "art" as distinguished from disciplina, a formal body of teachings which required study or training.

The origin of the Latin word coniectura suggests the process of making connections, from the verb conicio, participle coniectum (con-, "with, together", and iacio, "throw, put"). Coniectura was also a rhetorical term applied to forms of argumentation, including court cases. The English word "conjecture" derives from coniectura.

==== consecratio ====
Consecratio was the ritual act that resulted in the creation of an aedes, a shrine that housed a cult image, or an ara, an altar. Jerzy Linderski insists that the consecratio should be distinguished from the inauguratio, that is, the ritual by which the augurs established a sacred place (locus) or templum (sacred precinct). The consecration was performed by a pontiff reciting a formula from the libri pontificales, the pontifical books. One component of consecration was the dedicatio, or dedication, a form of ius publicum (public law) carried out by a magistrate representing the will of the Roman people. The pontiff was responsible for the consecration proper.

==== cultus ====
Cicero defined religio as cultus deorum, "the cultivation of the gods." The "cultivation" necessary to maintain a specific deity was that god's cultus, "cult," and required "the knowledge of giving the gods their due" (scientia colendorum deorum). The noun cultus originates from the past participle of the verb colo, colere, colui, cultus, "to tend, take care of, cultivate," originally meaning "to dwell in, inhabit" and thus "to tend, cultivate land (ager); to practice agriculture," an activity fundamental to Roman identity even when Rome as a political center had become fully urbanized. Cultus is often translated as "cult", without the negative connotations the word may have in English, or with the Anglo-Saxon word "worship", but it implies the necessity of active maintenance beyond passive adoration. Cultus was expected to matter to the gods as a demonstration of respect, honor, and reverence; it was an aspect of the contractual nature of Roman religion (do ut des). St. Augustine echoes Cicero's formulation when he declares that "religio is nothing other than the cultus of God."

=== D ===
==== decretum ====
Decreta (plural) were the binding explications of doctrine issued by the official priests on questions of religious practice and interpretation. They were preserved in written form and archived. Compare responsum.

==== delubrum ====
A delubrum was a shrine. Varro says it was a building that housed the image of a deus, "god", and emphasizes the human role in dedicating the statue. According to Varro, the delubrum was the oldest form of an aedes, a structure that housed a god. It is an ambiguous term for both the building and the surrounding area ubi aqua currit ("where water runs"), according to the etymology of the antiquarian Cincius. Festus gives the etymology of delubrum as fustem delibratum, "stripped stake," that is, a tree deprived of its bark (liber) by a lightning bolt, as such trees in archaic times were venerated as gods. The meaning of the term later extended to denote the shrine built to house the stake. Compare aedes, fanum, and templum.

Isidore connected the delubrum with the verb diluere, "to wash", describing it as a "spring-shrine", sometimes with annexed pool, where people would wash before entering, thus comparable to a Christian baptismal font.

==== detestatio sacrorum ====
When a person passed from one gens to another, as for instance by adoption, he renounced the religious duties (sacra) he had previously held in order to assume those of the family he was entering. The ritual procedure of detestatio sacrorum was enacted before a calate assembly.

==== deus, dea, di, dii ====
Deus, "god"; dea, "goddess", plural deae; di or dii, "gods", plural, or "deities", of mixed gender. The Greek equivalent is theos, which the Romans translated with deus. Servius says that deus or dea is a "generic term" (generale nomen) for all gods. In his lost work Antiquitates rerum divinarum, assumed to have been based on pontifical doctrine, Varro classified dii as certi, incerti, praecipui or selecti, i.e. "deities whose function could be ascertained", those whose function was unknown or indeterminate, main or selected gods. Compare divus. For etymological discussion, see Deus and Dyeus. See also List of Roman deities.

==== devotio ====
The devotio was an extreme form of votum in which a Roman general vowed to sacrifice his own life in battle along with the enemy to chthonic deities in exchange for a victory. The most extended description of the ritual is given by Livy, regarding the self-sacrifice of Decius Mus. The English word "devotion" derives from the Latin. For another votum that might be made in the field by a general, see evocatio.

==== dies imperii ====
A Roman emperor's dies imperii was the date on which he assumed imperium, that is, the anniversary of his accession as emperor. The date was observed annually with renewed oaths of loyalty and vota pro salute imperatoris, vows and offerings for the wellbeing (salus) of the emperor. Observances resembled those on January 3, which had replaced the traditional vows made for the salus of the republic after the transition to one-man rule under Augustus. The dies imperii was a recognition that succession during the Empire might take place irregularly through the death or overthrow of an emperor, in contrast to the annual magistracies of the Republic when the year was designated by the names of consuls serving their one-year term.

The dies Augusti or dies Augustus was more generally any anniversary pertaining to the imperial family, such as birthdays or weddings, appearing on official calendars as part of Imperial cult. References to a dies Caesaris are also found, but it is unclear whether or how it differed from the dies Augusti.

==== dies lustricus ====
The dies lustricus ("day of purification") was a rite carried out for the newborn on the eighth day of life for girls and the ninth day for boys. Little is known of the ritual procedure, but the child must have received its name on that day; funerary inscriptions for infants who died before their dies lustricus are nameless. The youngest person found commemorated on a Roman tombstone by name was a male infant nine days old (or 10 days in Roman inclusive counting). Because of the rate of infant mortality, perhaps as high as 40 percent, the newborn in its first few days of life was held as in a liminal phase, vulnerable to malignant forces (see List of Roman birth and childhood deities). Socially, the child did not exist. The dies lustricus may have been when the child received the bulla, the protective amulet that was put aside when a boy passed into adulthood.

==== dies natalis ====
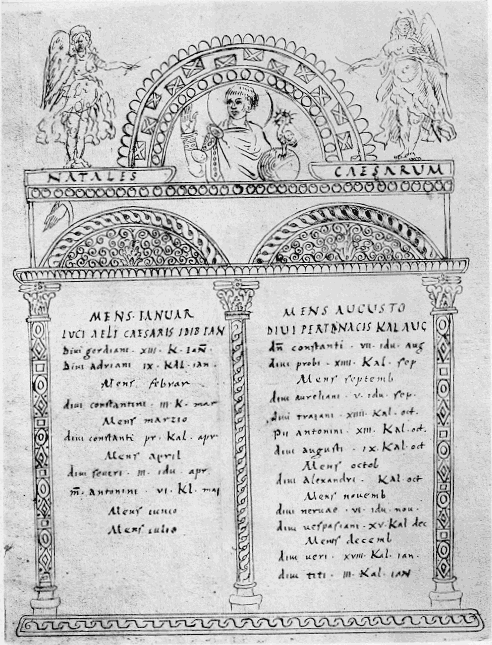
Page listing imperial natales by month from the 17th-century Codex Vaticanus Barberini latinus, based on the Calendar of Filocalus (354 AD)

A dies natalis was a birthday ("natal day"; see also dies lustricus above) or more generally the anniversary of a founding event. The Romans celebrated an individual's birthday annually, in contrast to the Greek practice of marking the date each month with a simple libation. The Roman dies natalis was connected with the cult owed to the Genius. A public figure might schedule a major event on his birthday: Pompeius Magnus ("Pompey the Great") waited seven months after he returned from his military campaigns in the East before he staged his triumph, so he could celebrate it on his birthday. The coincidence of birthdays and anniversaries could have a positive or negative significance: news of Decimus Brutus's victory at Mutina was announced at Rome on his birthday, while Caesar's assassin Cassius suffered defeat at Philippi on his birthday and committed suicide. Birthdays were one of the dates on which the dead were commemorated.

The date when a temple was founded, or when it was rededicated after a major renovation or rebuilding, was also a dies natalis, and might be felt as the "birthday" of the deity it housed as well. The date of such ceremonies was therefore chosen by the pontiffs with regard to its position on the religious calendar. The "birthday" or foundation date of Rome was celebrated April 21, the day of the Parilia, an archaic pastoral festival. As part of a flurry of religious reforms and restorations in the period from 38 BC to 17 AD, no fewer than fourteen temples had their dies natalis moved to another date, sometimes with the clear purpose of aligning them with new Imperial theology after the collapse of the Republic.

The birthdays of emperors were observed with public ceremonies as an aspect of Imperial cult. The Feriale Duranum, a military calendar of religious observances, features a large number of imperial birthdays. Augustus shared his birthday (September 23) with the anniversary of the Temple of Apollo in the Campus Martius, and elaborated on his connection with Apollo in developing his special religious status.

A birthday commemoration was also called a natalicium, which could take the form of a poem. Early Christian poets such as Paulinus of Nola adopted the natalicium poem for commemorating saints. The day on which Christian martyrs died is regarded as their dies natalis; see Calendar of saints.

==== dies religiosus ====
According to Festus, it was wrong (nefas) to undertake any action beyond attending to basic necessities on a day that was religiosus on the calendar. On these days, there were to be no marriages, political assemblies, or battles. Soldiers were not to be enlisted, nor journeys started. Nothing new was to be started, and no religious acts (res divinae) performed. Aulus Gellius said that dies religiosi were to be distinguished from those that were nefasti.

==== dies vitiosus ====
The phrase diem vitiare ("to vitiate a day") in augural practice meant that the normal activities of public business were prohibited on a given day, presumably by obnuntiatio, because of observed signs that indicated defect (morbus; see vitium). Unlike a dies religiosus or a dies ater ("black day," typically the anniversary of a calamity), a particular date did not become permanently vitiosus, with one exception. Some Roman calendars (fasti) produced under Augustus and up to the time of Claudius mark January 14 as a dies vitiosus, a day that was inherently "vitiated". January 14 is the only day to be marked annually and officially by decree of the Roman senate (senatus consultum) as vitiosus. Linderski calls this "a very remarkable innovation." One calendar, the Fasti Verulani (c. 17–37 AD), explains the designation by noting it was the dies natalis of Mark Antony, which the Greek historian and Roman senator Cassius Dio says had been declared ἡμέρα μιαρά (hēmera miara) (= dies vitiosus) by Augustus. The emperor Claudius, who was the grandson of Antony, rehabilitated the day.

==== dirae ====
The adjective dirus as applied to an omen meant "dire, awful." It often appears in the feminine plural as a substantive meaning "evil omens." Dirae were the worst of the five kinds of signs recognized by the augurs, and were a type of oblative or unsought sign that foretold disastrous consequences. The ill-fated departure of Marcus Crassus for the invasion of Parthia was notably attended by dirae (see Ateius Capito). In the interpretive etymology of ancient writers, dirae was thought to derive from dei irae, the grudges or anger of a god, that is, divine wrath. Dirae is an epithet for the Furies, and can also mean curses or imprecations, particularly in the context of magic and related to defixiones (curse tablets). In explaining why Claudius felt compelled to ban the religion of the druids, Suetonius speaks of it as dirus, alluding to the practice of human sacrifice.

==== disciplina Etrusca ====
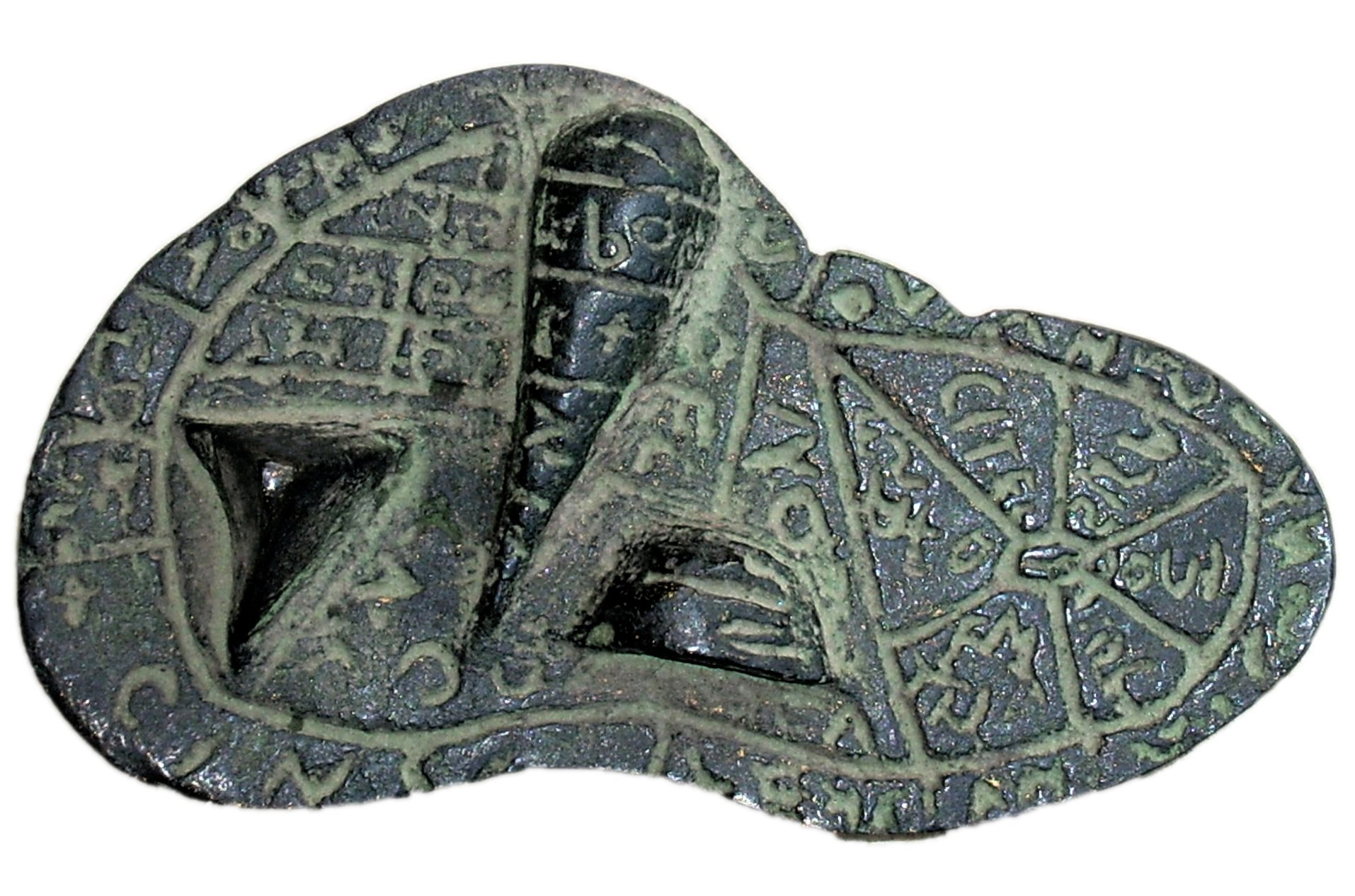
Etruscan liver of Piacenza

The collective body of knowledge pertaining to the doctrine, ritual practices, laws, and science of Etruscan religion and cosmology was known as the disciplina Etrusca. Divination was a particular feature of the disciplina. The Etruscan texts on the disciplina that were known to the Romans are of three kinds: the libri haruspicini (on haruspicy), the libri fulgurales (lightning), and the libri rituales (ritual). Nigidius Figulus, the Late Republican scholar and praetor of 58 BC, was noted for his expertise in the disciplina. Extant ancient sources on the Etrusca disciplina include Pliny the Elder, Seneca, Cicero, Johannes Lydus, Macrobius and Festus.

==== divus ====
The adjective divus, feminine diva, is usually translated as "divine." As a substantive, divus refers to a "deified" or divinized mortal. Both deus and divus derive from Indo-European *deywos, Old Latin deivos. Servius confirms that deus is used for "perpetual deities" (deos perpetuos), but divus for people who become divine (divos ex hominibus factos = gods who once were men). While this distinction is useful in considering the theological foundations of Imperial cult, it sometimes vanishes in practice, particularly in Latin poetry; Virgil, for instance, mostly uses deus and divus interchangeably. Varro and Ateius, however, maintained that the definitions should be reversed.

==== do ut des ====
The formula do ut des ("I give that you might give") expresses the reciprocity of exchange between human being and deity, reflecting the importance of gift-giving as a mutual obligation in ancient society and the contractual nature of Roman religion. The gifts offered by the human being take the form of sacrifice, with the expectation that the god will return something of value, prompting gratitude and further sacrifices in a perpetuating cycle. The do ut des principle is particularly active in magic and private ritual. Do ut des was also a judicial concept of contract law.

In Pauline theology, do ut des was viewed as a reductive form of piety, merely a "business transaction", in contrast to God's unilateral grace (χάρις, charis). Max Weber, in The Sociology of Religion, saw it as "a purely formalistic ethic." In The Elementary Forms of Religious Life, however, Émile Durkheim regarded the concept as not merely utilitarian, but an expression of "the mechanism of the sacrificial system itself" as "an exchange of mutually invigorating good deeds between the divinity and his faithful."

=== E ===
==== effatio ====
The verb effari, past participle effatus, means "to create boundaries (fines) by means of fixed verbal formulas." Effatio is the abstract noun. It was one of the three parts of the ceremony inaugurating a templum (sacred space), preceded by the consulting of signs and the liberatio which "freed" the space from malign or competing spiritual influences and human effects. A site liberatus et effatus was thus "exorcized and available." The result was a locus inauguratus ("inaugurated site"), the most common form of which was the templum. The boundaries had permanent markers (cippi or termini), and when these were damaged or removed, their effatio had to be renewed.

==== evocatio ====
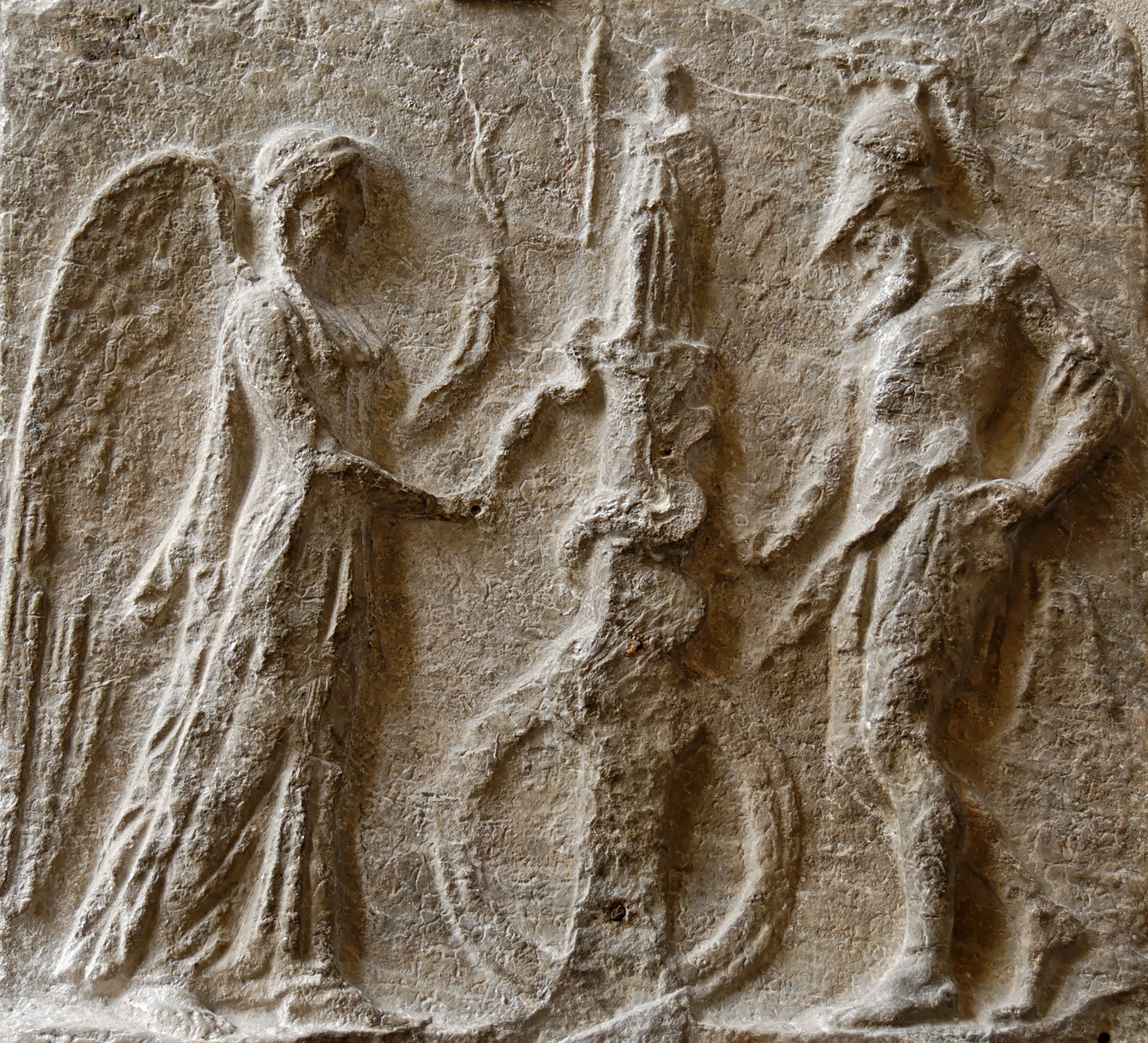
Relief (1st century AD) depicting the Palladium atop a column entwined by a snake, to which Victory presents an egg as a warrior attends in a pose of peace

The "calling forth" or "summoning away" of a deity was an evocatio, from ēvocō, ēvocāre, "summon." The ritual was conducted in a military setting either as a threat during a siege or as a result of surrender, and aimed at diverting the favor of a tutelary deity from the opposing city to the Roman side, customarily with a promise of a better-endowed cult or a more lavish temple. As a tactic of psychological warfare, evocatio undermined the enemy's sense of security by threatening the sanctity of its city walls (see pomerium) and other forms of divine protection. In practice, evocatio was a way to mitigate otherwise sacrilegious looting of religious images from shrines.

Recorded examples of evocations include the transferral of Juno Regina ("Juno the Queen", originally Etruscan Uni) from Veii in 396 BC; the ritual performed by Scipio Aemilianus in 146 BC at the defeat of Carthage, involving Tanit (Juno Caelestis); and the dedication of a temple to an unnamed, gender-indeterminate deity at Isaura Vetus in Asia Minor in 75 BC. Some scholars think that Vortumnus (Etruscan Voltumna) was brought by evocation to Rome in 264 BC as a result of M. Fulvius Flaccus's defeat of the Volsinii. In Roman myth, a similar concept motivates the transferral of the Palladium from Troy to Rome, where it served as one of the pignora imperii, sacred tokens of Roman sovereignty. Compare invocatio, the "calling on" of a deity.

Formal evocations are known only during the Republic. Other forms of religious assimilation appear from the time of Augustus, often in connection with the establishment of the Imperial cult in the provinces.

Evocatio, "summons", was also a term of Roman law without evident reference to its magico-religious sense.

==== exauguratio ====
A site that had been inaugurated (locus inauguratus), that is, marked out through augural procedure, could not have its purpose changed without a ceremony of reversal. Removing a god from the premises required the correct ceremonial invocations. When Tarquin rebuilt the temple district on the Capitoline, a number of deities were dislodged by exauguratio, though Terminus and Juventas "refused" and were incorporated into the new structure. A distinction between the exauguratio of a deity and an evocatio can be unclear. The procedure was in either case rare, and was required only when a deity had to yield place to another, or when the site was secularized. It was not required when a site was upgraded, for instance, if an open-air altar were to be replaced with a temple building to the same god.

The term could also be used for removing someone from a priestly office (sacerdotium). Compare inauguratio.

==== eximius ====
An adjective, "choice, select," used to denote the high quality required of sacrificial victims: "Victims (hostiae) are called 'select' (eximiae) because they are selected (eximantur) from the herd and designated for sacrifice, or because they are chosen on account of their choice (eximia) appearance as offerings to divine entities (numinibus)." The adjective here is synonymous with egregius, "chosen from the herd (grex, gregis)." Macrobius says it is specifically a sacerdotal term and not a "poetic epithet" (poeticum ἐπίθετον).

==== exta ====
The exta were the entrails of a sacrificed animal, comprising in Cicero's enumeration the gall bladder (fel), liver (iecur), heart (cor), and lungs (pulmones). The exta were exposed for litation (divine approval) as part of Roman liturgy, but were "read" in the context of the disciplina Etrusca. As a product of Roman sacrifice, the exta and blood are reserved for the gods, while the meat (viscera) is shared among human beings in a communal meal. The exta of bovine victims were usually stewed in a pot (olla or aula), while those of sheep or pigs were grilled on skewers. When the deity's portion was cooked, it was sprinkled with mola salsa (ritually prepared salted flour) and wine, then placed in the fire on the altar for the offering; the technical verb for this action was porricere.

=== F ===
==== fanaticus ====
Fanaticus means "belonging to a fanum," a shrine or sacred precinct. Fanatici as applied to people refers to temple attendants or devotees of a cult, usually one of the ecstatic or orgiastic religions such as that of Cybele (in reference to the Galli), Bellona-Ma, or perhaps Silvanus. Inscriptions indicate that a person making a dedication might label himself fanaticus, in the neutral sense of "devotee". Tacitus uses fanaticus to describe the troop of druids who attended on the Icenian queen Boudica. The word was often used disparagingly by ancient Romans in contrasting these more emotive rites to the highly scripted procedures of public religion, and later by early Christians to deprecate religions other than their own; hence the negative connotation of "fanatic" in English.

Festus says that a tree struck by lightning is called fanaticus, a reference to the Romano-Etruscan belief in lightning as a form of divine sign. The Gallic bishop Caesarius of Arles, writing in the 5th century, indicates that such trees retained their sanctity even up to his own time, and urged the Christian faithful to burn down the arbores fanaticae. These trees either were located in and marked a fanum or were themselves considered a fanum. Caesarius is somewhat unclear as to whether the devotees regarded the tree itself as divine or whether they thought its destruction would kill the numen housed within it. Either way, even scarcity of firewood would not persuade them to use the sacred wood for fuel, a scruple for which he mocked them.

==== fanum ====
A fanum is a plot of consecrated ground, a sanctuary, and from that a temple or shrine built there. A fanum may be a traditional sacred space such as the grove (lucus) of Diana Nemorensis, or a sacred space or structure for non-Roman religions, such as an Iseum (temple of Isis) or Mithraeum. Cognates such as Oscan fíísnú, Umbrian fesnaf-e, and Paelignian fesn indicate that the concept is shared by Italic peoples. The Greek temenos was the same concept. By the Augustan period, fanum, aedes, templum, and delubrum are scarcely distinguishable in usage, but fanum was a more inclusive and general term.

The fanum, Romano-Celtic temple, or ambulatory temple of Roman Gaul was often built over an originally Celtic religious site, and its plan was influenced by the ritual architecture of earlier Celtic sanctuaries. The masonry temple building of the Gallo-Roman period had a central space (cella) and a peripheral gallery structure, both square. Romano-Celtic fana of this type are found also in Roman Britain.

The English word "profane" ultimately derives from Latin pro fano, "before, i.e. outside, the temple", "In front of the sanctuary," hence not within sacred ground.

==== fata deorum ====
Fata deorum or the contracted form fata deum are the utterances of the gods; that is, prophecies. These were recorded in written form, and conserved by the state priests of Rome for consultation. The fata are both "fate" as known and determined by the gods, or the expression of the divine will in the form of verbal oracles. Fata deum is a theme of the Aeneid, Virgil's national epic of Rome.

The Sibylline Books (Fata Sibyllina or Libri Fatales), composed in Greek hexameters, are an example of written fata. These were not Roman in origin but were believed to have been acquired in only partial form by Lucius Tarquinius Superbus. They were guarded by the priesthood of the decemviri sacris faciundis "ten men for carrying out sacred rites", later fifteen in number: quindecimviri sacris faciundis. No one read the books in their entirety; they were consulted only when needed. A passage was selected at random and its relevance to the current situation was a matter of expert interpretation. They were thought to contain fata rei publicae aeterna, "prophecies eternally valid for Rome". They continued to be consulted throughout the Imperial period until the time of Christian hegemony. Augustus installed the Sibylline books in a special golden storage case under the statue of Apollo in the Temple of Apollo Palatinus. The emperor Aurelian chastised the senate for succumbing to Christian influence and not consulting the books. Julian consulted the books regarding his campaign against Persia, but departed before he received the unfavorable response of the college; Julian was killed and the Temple of Apollo Palatinus burned.

==== fas ====
Fas is a central concept in Roman religion. Although translated in some contexts as "divine law," fas is more precisely that which is "religiously legitimate," or an action that is lawful in the eyes of the gods. In public religion, fas est is declared before announcing an action required or allowed by Roman religious custom and by divine law. Fas is thus both distinguished from and linked to ius (plural iura), "law, lawfulness, justice," as indicated by Virgil's often-cited phrase fas et iura sinunt, "fas and iura allow (it)," which Servius explains as "divine and human laws permit (it), for fas pertains to religion, iura to the human being."

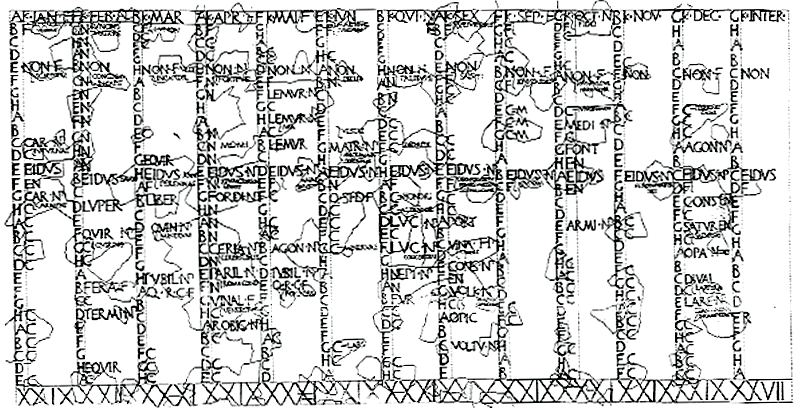
The Fasti Antiates Maiores, a pre-Julian calendar in a reconstructed drawing

In Roman calendars, days marked F are dies fasti, when it is fas to attend to the concerns of everyday life. In non-specialized usage, fas est may mean generally "it is permissible, it is right."

The etymology of fas is debated. It is more commonly associated with the semantic field of the verb for, fari, "to speak," an origin pressed by Varro. In other sources, both ancient and modern, fas is thought to have its origin in an Indo-European root meaning "to establish," along with fanum and feriae. See also Fasti and nefas.

==== fasti ====
A record or plan of official and religiously sanctioned events. All state and societal business must be transacted on dies fasti, "allowed days". The fasti were the records of all details pertaining to these events. The word was used alone in a general sense or qualified by an adjective to mean a specific type of record. Closely associated with the fasti and used to mark time in them were the divisions of the Roman calendar.

The Fasti is also the title of a six-book poem by Ovid based on the Roman religious calendar. It is a major source for Roman religious practice, and was translated into English by J. G. Frazer.

==== felix ====
In its religious sense, felix means "blessed, under the protection or favour of the gods; happy." That which is felix has achieved the pax divom, a state of harmony or peace with the divine world. It is rooted in Indo-European *dhe(i)l, meaning "happy, fruitful, productive, full of nourishment." Related Latin words include femina, "woman" (a person who provides nourishment or suckles); felo, "to suckle"; and filius, "son" (a person suckled). See also Felicitas, both an abstraction that expressed the quality of being felix and a deity of Roman state religion.

==== feria ====
A feria on the Roman calendar is a "free day", that is, a day in which no work was done. No court sessions were held, nor was any public business conducted. Employees were entitled to a day off, and even slaves were not obliged to work. These days were codified into a system of legal public holidays, the feriae publicae, which could be

- stativae, "stationary, fixed", holidays which recurred on the same date each year;
- conceptivae, recurring holidays for which the date depended on some other factor, usually the agrarian cycle. They included Compitalia, Paganalia, Sementivae and Latinae (compare the moveable Christian holiday of Easter);
- imperativae, one-off holidays ordered to mark a special occasion, established with an act of authority of a magistrate.

In the Christian Roman Rite, a feria is a day of the week other than Saturday or Sunday. The custom throughout Europe of holding markets on the same day gave rise to the word "fair" (Spanish Feria, Italian Fiera, Catalan Fira).

==== festus ====
In the Roman calendar, a dies festus is a festive or holy day, that is, a day dedicated to a deity or deities. On such days it was forbidden to undertake any profane activity, especially official or public business. All dies festi were thus nefasti. Some days, however, were not festi and yet might not be permissible as business days (fasti) for other reasons. The days on which profane activities were permitted are profesti.

==== fetial ====
The fetiales, or fetial priests.

==== finis ====
The finis (limit, border, boundary), plural fines, was an essential concept in augural practice, which was concerned with the definition of the templum. Establishing fines was an important part of a magistrate's duties. Most scholars regard the finis as having been defined physically by ropes, trees, stones, or other markers, as were fields and property boundaries in general. It was connected with the god Terminus and his cult.

==== flamen ====
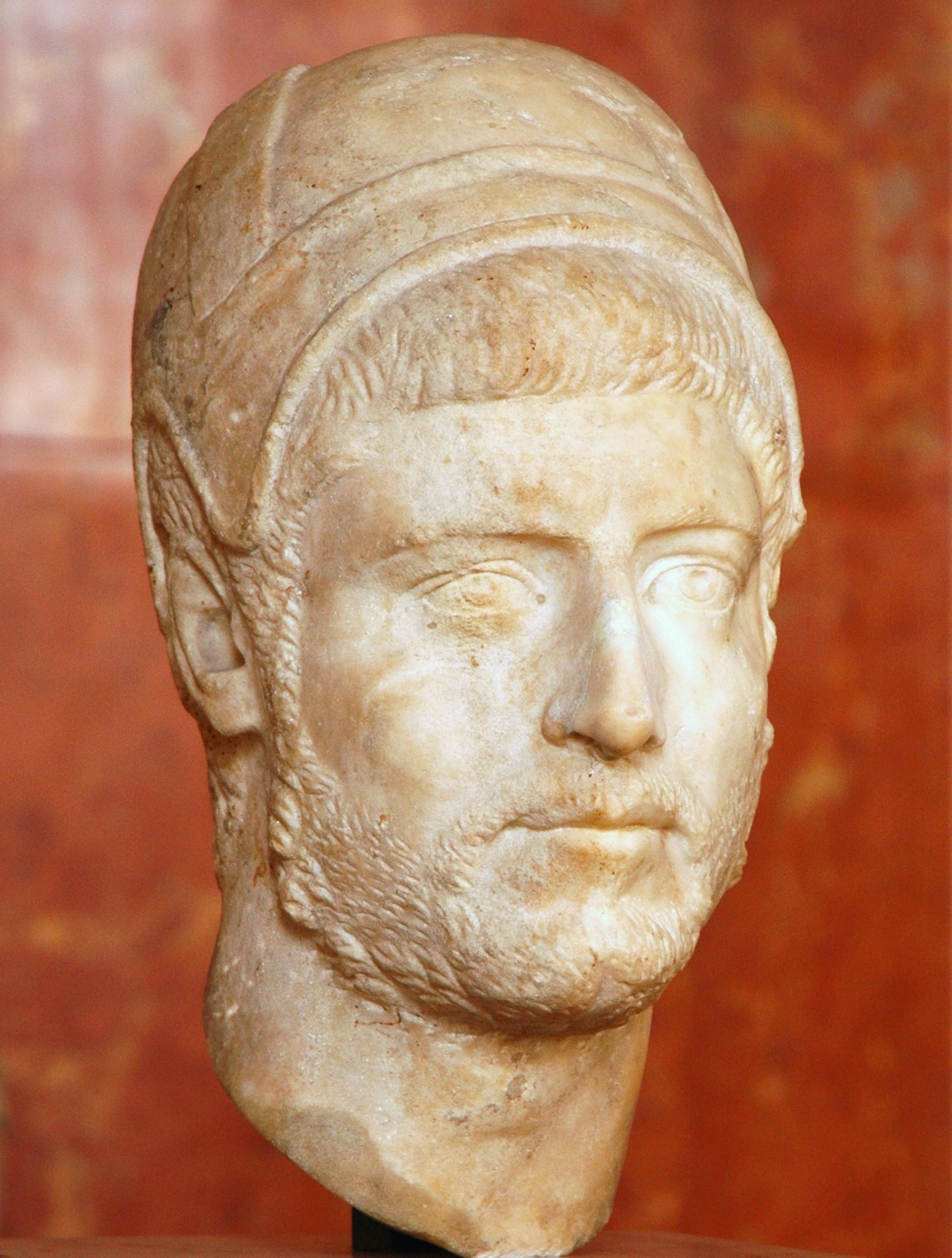
Flamen wearing the distinctive hat of his office, with the top point missing (3rd century AD)

The fifteen flamines formed part of the College of Pontiffs. Each flamen served as the high priest to one of the official deities of Roman religion, and led the rituals relating to that deity. The flamines were regarded as the most ancient among the sacerdotes, as many of them were assigned to deities who dated back to the prehistory of Latium and whose significance had already become obscure by classical times.

The archaic nature of the flamens is indicated by their presence among Latin tribes. They officiated at ceremonies with their head covered by a velum and always wore a filamen, thread, in contrast to public rituals conducted by Greek rite (ritus graecus) which were established later. Ancient authors derive the word flamen from the custom of covering the head with the filamen, but it may be cognate to Vedic brahmin. The distinctive headgear of the flamen was the apex.

==== Fratres Arvales ====
The "Brothers of the Field" were a college of priests whose duties were concerned with agriculture and farming. They were the most ancient religious sodalitas: according to tradition they were created by Romulus, but probably predated the foundation of Rome.

=== G ===
==== Gabinus ====
The adjective gabinus describes an element of religion that the Romans attributed to practices from Gabii, a town of Latium with municipal status about 12 miles from Rome. The incorporation of Gabinian traditions indicates their special status under treaty with Rome. See cinctus gabinus and ager gabinus.

=== H ===
==== hostia ====
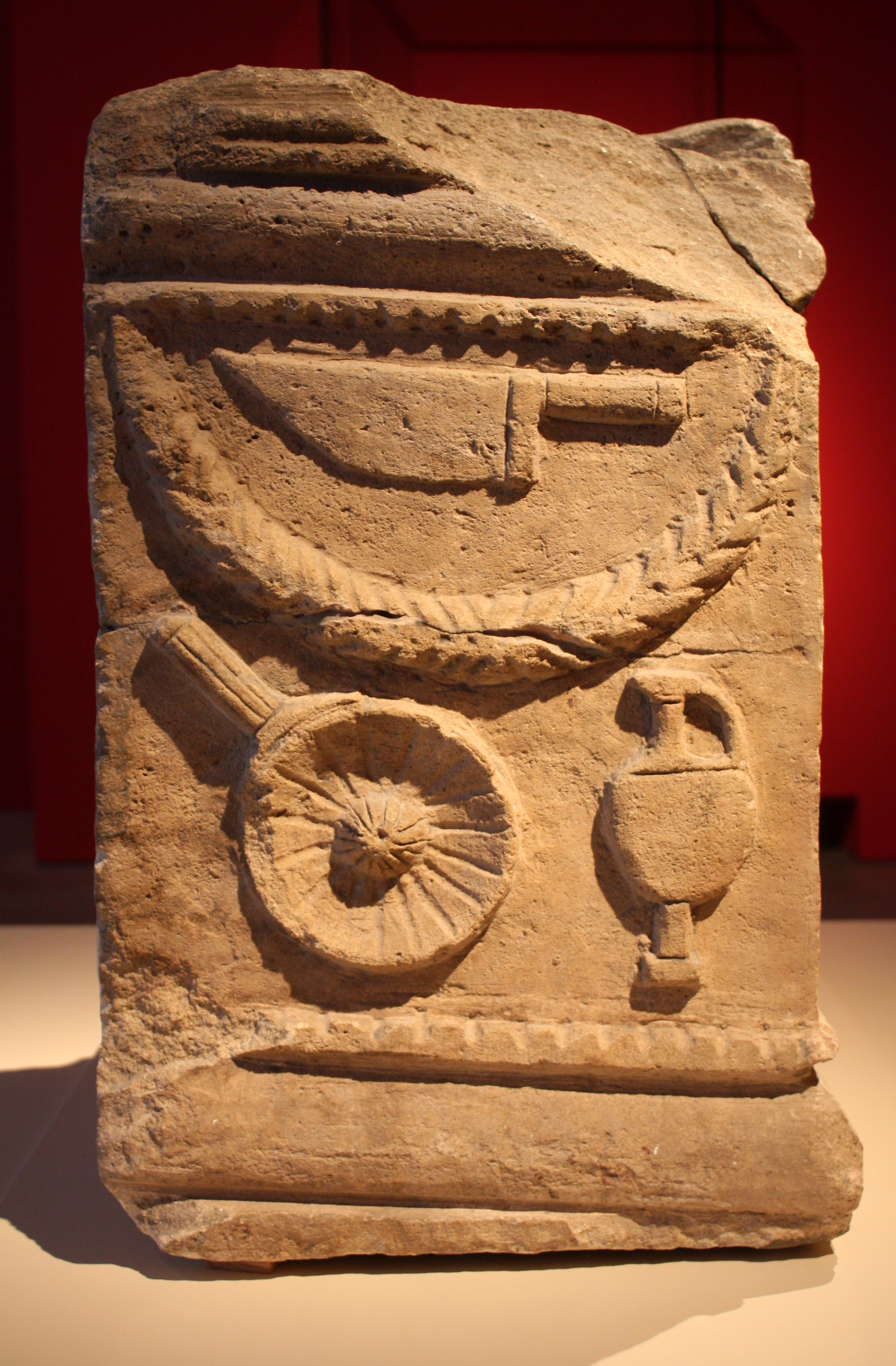
Ritual implements

The hostia was the offering, usually an animal, in a sacrifice. The word is used interchangeably with victima by Ovid and others, but some ancient authors attempt to distinguish between the two. Servius says that the hostia is sacrificed before battle, the victima afterward, which accords with Ovid's etymology in relating the "host" to the "hostiles" or enemy (hostis), and the "victim" to the "victor."

The difference between the victima and hostia is elsewhere said to be a matter of size, with the hostia smaller (minor). Hostiae were also classified by age: lactentes were young enough to be still taking milk, but had reached the age to be purae; bidentes had reached two years of age or had the two longer (bi-) incisor teeth (dentes) that are an indication of age.

Hostiae could be classified in various ways. A hostia consultatoria was an offering for the purpose of consulting with a deity, that is, in order to know the will of a deity; the hostia animalis, to increase the force (mactare) of the deity.

The victim might also be classified by occasion and timing. The hostia praecidanea was an "anticipatory offering" made the day before a sacrifice. It was an advance atonement "to implore divine indulgence" should an error be committed on the day of the formal sacrifice. A preliminary pig was offered as a praecidanea the day before the harvest began. The hostia praecidanea was offered to Ceres a day in advance of a religious festival (sacrum, before the beginning of the harvest) in expiation for negligences in the duties of piety towards the deceased. The hostia praesentanaea was a pig offered to Ceres during a part of the funeral rites conducted within sight of the deceased, whose family was thereby ritually absolved. A hostia succidanea was offered at any rite after the first sacrifice had failed owing to a ritual impropriety (vitium). Compare piaculum, an expiatory offering.

Hostia is the origin of the word "host" for the Eucharistic sacrament of the Western Church; see Sacramental bread: Catholic Church. See also votum, a dedication or a vow of an offering to a deity as well as that which fulfilled the vow.

=== I ===
==== inauguratio ====
A rite performed by augurs by which the concerned person received the approval of the gods for his appointment or their investiture. The augur would ask for the appearance of certain signs (auspicia impetrativa) while standing beside the appointee on the auguraculum. In the Regal period, inauguratio concerned the king and the major sacerdotes. After the establishment of the Republic, the rex sacrorum, the three flamines maiores, the augurs, and the pontiffs all had to be inaugurated.

The term may also refer to the ritual establishing of the augural templum and the tracing of the wall of a new city.

==== indigitamenta ====
The indigitamenta were lists of gods maintained by the College of Pontiffs to assure that the correct divine names were invoked for public prayers. It is sometimes unclear whether these names represent distinct minor entities, or epithets pertaining to an aspect of a major deity's sphere of influence, that is, an indigitation, or name intended to "fix" or focalize the local action of the god so invoked. Varro is assumed to have drawn on direct knowledge of the lists in writing his theological books, as evidenced by the catalogues of minor deities mocked by the Church Fathers who used his work as a reference. Another source is likely to have been the non-extant work De indigitamentis of Granius Flaccus, Varro's contemporary. Not to be confused with the di indigetes.

==== invocatio ====
The addressing of a deity in a prayer or magic spell is the invocatio, from invoco, invocare, "to call upon" the gods or spirits of the dead. The efficacy of the invocatio depends on the correct naming of the deity, which may include epithets, descriptive phrases, honorifics or titles, and arcane names. The list of names (nomina) is often extensive, particularly in magic spells; many prayers and hymns are composed largely of invocations. The name is invoked in either the vocative or the accusative case. In specialized usage pertaining to augural procedure, invocatio is a synonym for precatio, but specifically aimed at averting mala, evil occurrences. Compare evocatio.

The equivalent term in ancient Greek religion is epiklesis. Pausanias distinguished among the categories of theonym proper, poetic epithet, the epiclesis of local cult, and an epiclesis that might be used universally among the Greeks. Epiclesis remains in use by some Christian churches for the invocation of the Holy Spirit during the Eucharistic prayer.

==== ius ====
Ius is the Latin word for justice, right, equity, fairness and all which came to be understood as the sphere of law. It is defined in the opening words of the Digesta with the words of Celsus as "the art of that which is good and fair" and similarly by Paulus as "that which is always just and fair". The polymath Varro and the jurist Gaius consider the distinction between divine and human ius essential but divine order is the source of all laws, whether natural or human, so the pontifex is considered the final judge (iudex) and arbiter. The jurist Ulpian defines jurisprudence as "the knowledge of human and divine affairs, of what is just and unjust".

==== ius divinum ====
"Sacred law" or "divine law", particularly in regard to the gods' rights pertaining to their "property", that which is rightfully theirs. Recognition of the ius divinum was fundamental to maintaining right relations between human beings and their deities. The concern for law and legal procedure that was characteristic of ancient Roman society was also inherent in Roman religion. See also pax deorum.

==== ius pontificum ====
Pontifical law governing Roman religion covered sacra, rites; vota, pledges; feriae, holy days; and sepulchra, graves. Cicero describes it as absconditum, secret. A book on pontifical law, probably the one written in the mid-2nd century BC by Fabius Pictor, was consulted by Aulus Gellius in the 2nd century AD as a source on the flamen and flaminica Dialis.

=== L ===
==== lavatio ====
The bathing of the cult image of a deity, particularly goddesses, might be prescribed in an annual ritual. A lavatio was an especial part of the imported cult of Cybele, whose statue and associated objects were carried in procession for bathing in the river Almo. Ovid says that the statue of Venus Verticordia was bathed as part of the Veneralia on the first of April, but the absence of this lavatio in any other source may indicate that since it was meant to be conducted by women, the magistrates did not attend.

==== lectisternium ====
The lectisternium was a propitiatory ceremony that took the form of a meal offered to divinities, as if seated for banqueting on a couch (lectus).

==== lex ====
The word lex (plural leges) derives from the Indo-European root *leg, as do the Latin verbs lego, legare, ligo, ligare ("to appoint, bequeath") and lego, legere (" to gather, choose, select, discern, read": cf. also Greek verb legein "to collect, tell, speak"), and the abstract noun religio. Parties to legal proceedings and contracts bound themselves to observance by the offer of sacrifice to witnessing deities.

Even though the word lex underwent the frequent semantic shift in Latin towards the legal area, its original meaning of set, formulaic words was preserved in some instances. Some cult formulae are leges: an augur's request for particular signs that would betoken divine approval in an augural rite (augurium), or in the inauguration of magistrates and some sacerdotes is named legum dictio. The formula quaqua lege volet ("by whatever lex, i.e. wording he wishes") allowed a cult performer discretion in his choice of ritual words. The leges templi regulated cult actions at various temples.

In civil law, ritualised sets of words and gestures known as legis actiones were in use as a legal procedure in civil cases; they were regulated by custom and tradition (mos maiorum) and were thought to involve protection of the performers from malign or occult influences.

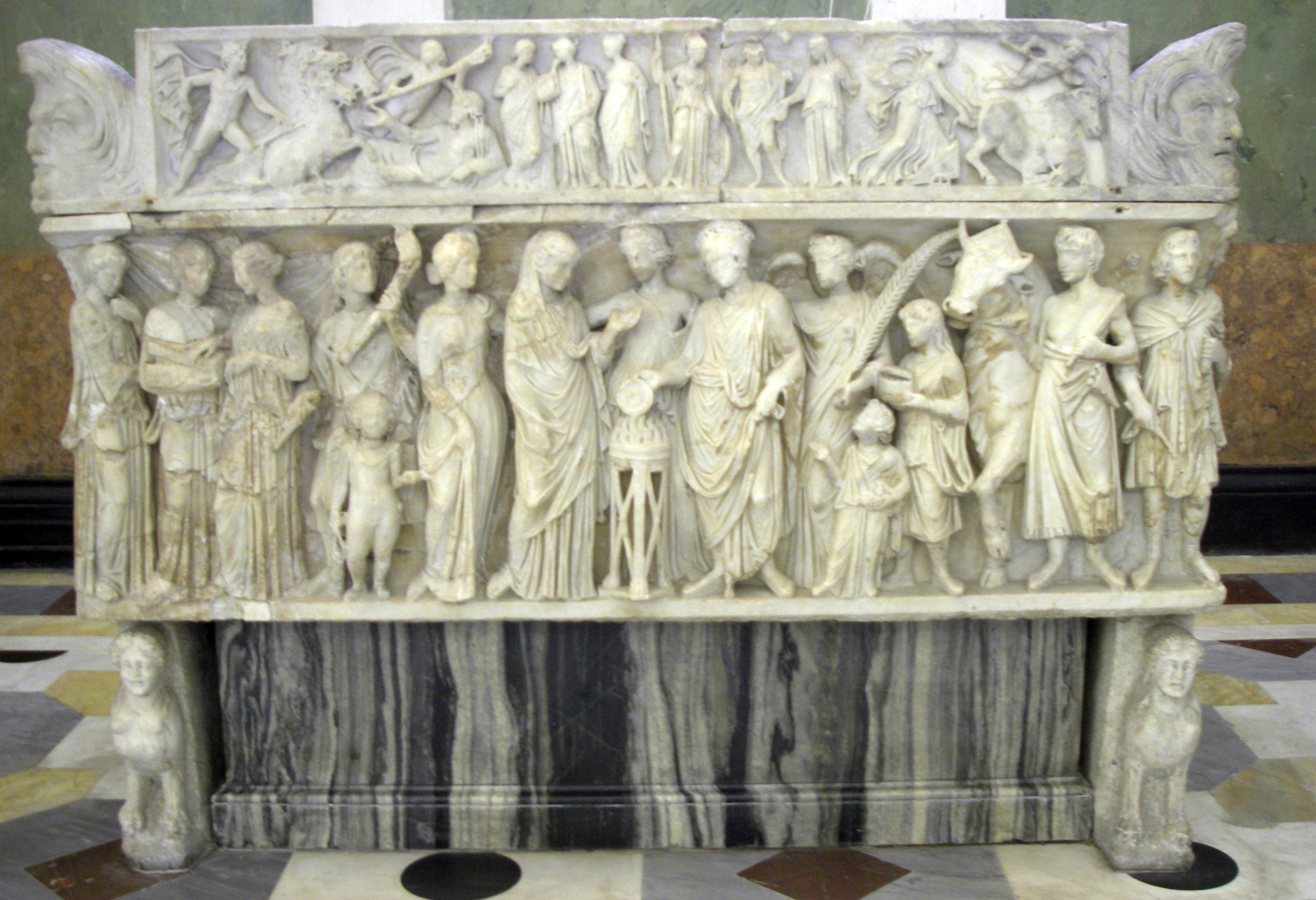
Libation preceding a sacrifice, depicted on a 3rd-century sarcophagus

==== libatio ====
Libation (Latin libatio, Greek spondai) was one of the simplest religious acts, regularly performed in daily life. At home, a Roman who was about to drink wine would pour the first few drops onto the household altar. The drink offering might also be poured on the ground or at a public altar. Milk and honey, water, and oil were also used.

==== liberatio ====
The liberatio (from the verb liberare, "to free") was the "liberating" of a place (locus) from "all unwanted or hostile spirits and of all human influences," as part of the ceremony inaugurating the templum (sacred space). It was preceded by the consulting of signs and followed by the effatio, the creation of boundaries (fines). A site liberatus et effatus was "exorcized and available" for its sacred purpose.

==== libri augurales ====
The augural books (libri augurales) represented the collective, core knowledge of the augural college. Some scholars consider them distinct from the commentarii augurum (commentaries of the augurs) which recorded the collegial acts of the augurs, including the decreta and responsa. The books were central to the practice of augury. They have not survived, but Cicero, who was an augur himself, offers a summary in De Legibus that represents "precise dispositions based certainly on an official collection edited in a professional fashion."

==== libri pontificales ====
The libri pontificales (pontifical books) are core texts in Roman religion, which survive as fragmentary transcripts and commentaries. They may have been partly annalistic, part priestly; different Roman authors refer to them as libri and commentarii (commentaries), described by Livy as incomplete "owing to the long time elapsed and the rare use of writing" and by Quintillian as unintelligibly archaic and obscure. The earliest were credited to Numa, second king of Rome, who was thought to have codified the core texts and principles of Rome's religious and civil law (ius divinum and ius civile). See also commentarii pontificum.

==== litatio ====
In animal sacrifice, the litatio followed the opening up of the body cavity for the inspection of the entrails (inspicere exta). Litatio was not a part of divinatory practice as derived from the Etruscans (see extispicy and Liver of Piacenza), but rather a certification according to Roman liturgy of the gods' approval. The point was not that those sacrificing had to make sure that the victim was perfect inside and out; rather, the good internal condition of the animal was evidence of divine acceptance of the offering. The need for the deity to approve and accept (litare) underscores that the reciprocity of sacrifice (do ut des) was not to be taken for granted.

If the organs were diseased or defective, the procedure had to be restarted with a new victim (hostia). In 176 BC the presiding consuls attempted to sacrifice an ox, only to find that its liver had been consumed by a wasting disease. After three more oxen failed to pass the test, the senate's instructions were to keep sacrificing bigger victims until litatio could be obtained.

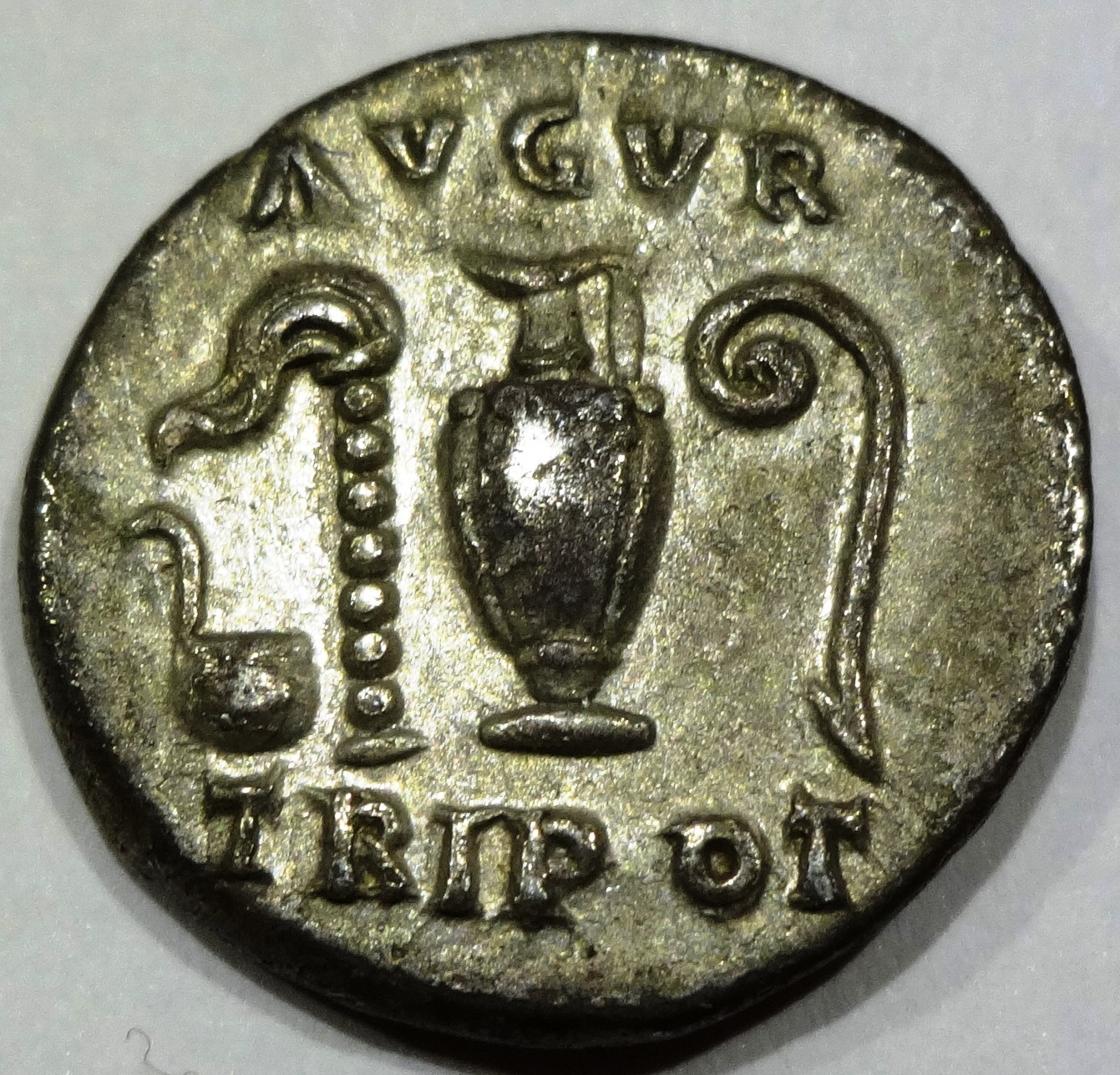
Lituus (at right) and other priestly implements under the title augur

==== lituus ====
The lituus is the distinctively curved staff of an augur, frequently depicted on Roman coins and most often accompanied by a ritual jug or pitcher. The presence of the lituus indicates that either the moneyer or person honored on the obverse was an augur.

==== lucus ====
In religious usage, a lucus was a grove or small wooded area considered sacred to a divinity. Entrance might be severely restricted: Paulus explains that a capitalis lucus was protected from human access under penalty of death. Leges sacratae (laws for the violation of which the offender is outlawed) concerning sacred groves have been found on cippi at Spoleto in Umbria and Lucera in Apulia. See also nemus.

==== ludi ====
Ludi were games held as part of religious festivals, and some were originally sacral in nature. These included chariot racing and the venatio, or staged animal-human blood sport that may have had a sacrificial element.

==== Luperci ====
The "wolf priests", organized into two colleges and later three, who participated in the Lupercalia. The most famous person to serve as a lupercus was Mark Antony.

==== lustratio ====
The lustratio is a ritual of purification that was held every five years under the jurisdiction of censors in Rome. Its original meaning was purifying by washing in water (Lat. lustrum from verb luo, "I wash in water"). The time elapsing between two subsequent lustrations being of five years the term lustrum took up the meaning of a period of five year.

=== M ===
==== manubia ====
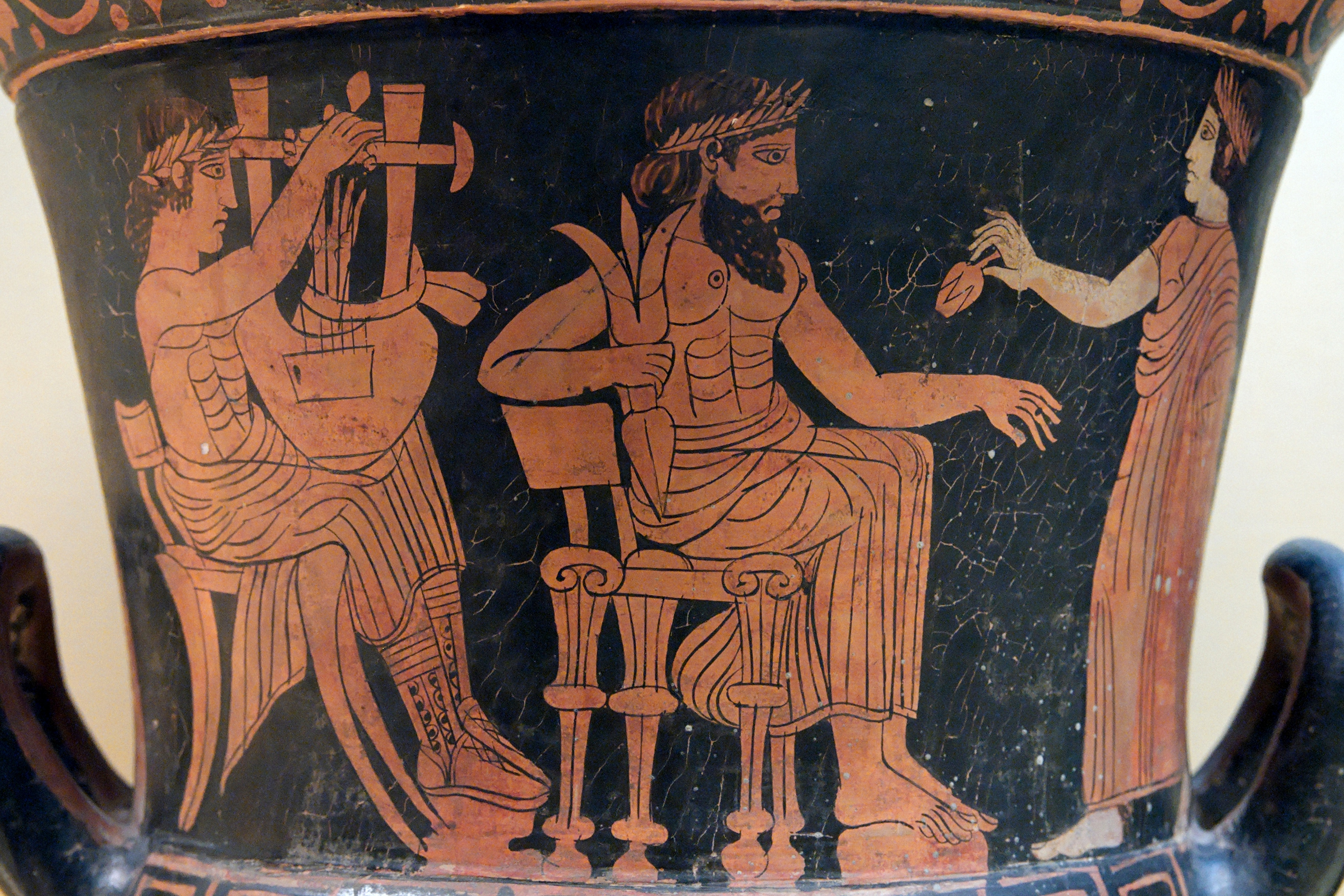
Zeus (Etruscan Tinia, Roman Jupiter) holding a three-pronged lightning bolt, between Apollo and Hera/Juno (red-figure calyx-krater from Etruria, 420-400 BC)

Manubia is a technical term of the Etruscan discipline, and refers to the power of a deity to wield lightning, represented in divine icons by a lightning bolt in the hand. It may be either a Latinized word from Etruscan or less likely a formation from manus, "hand," and habere, "to have, hold." It is not apparently related to the more common Latin word manubiae meaning "booty (taken by a general in war)." Seneca uses the term in an extended discussion of lightning. Jupiter, as identified with Etruscan Tinia, held three types of manubiae sent from three different celestial regions. Stefan Weinstock describes these as:

1. mild, or "perforating" lightning;
2. harmful or "crushing" lightning, which is sent on the advice of the twelve Di Consentes and occasionally does some good;
3. destructive or "burning" lightning, which is sent on the advice of the di superiores et involuti (hidden gods of the "higher" sphere) and changes the state of public and private affairs.

Jupiter makes use of the first type of beneficial lightning to persuade or dissuade. Books on how to read lightning were one of the three main forms of Etruscan learning on the subject of divination.

==== miraculum ====
One of several words for portent or sign, miraculum is a non-technical term that places emphasis on the observer's response (mirum, "a wonder, marvel"). Livy uses the word miraculum, for instance, to describe the sign visited upon Servius Tullius as a child, when divine flames burst forth from his head and the royal household witnessed the event. Compare monstrum, ostentum, portentum, and prodigium.

Miraculum is the origin of the English word "miracle." Christian writers later developed a distinction between miracula, the true forms of which were evidence of divine power in the world, and mere mirabilia, things to be marveled at but not resulting from God's intervention. "Pagan" marvels were relegated to the category of mirabilia and attributed to the work of demons.

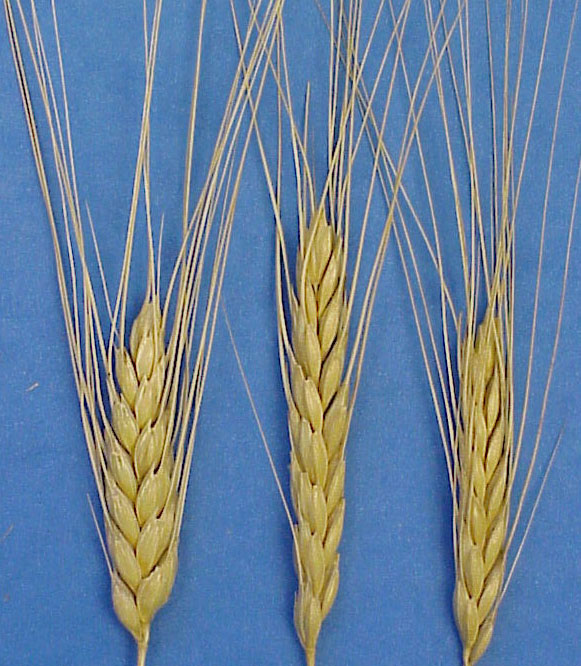
Emmer wheat, used for mola salsa

==== mola salsa ====
Flour mixed with salt was sprinkled on the forehead and between the horns of sacrificial victims, as well as on the altar and in the sacred fire. This mola salsa ('salted flour') was prepared ritually from toasted wheat or emmer, spelt, or barley by the Vestals, who thus contributed to every official sacrifice in Rome. Servius uses the words pius and castus to describe the product. The mola was so fundamental to sacrifice that "to put on the mola" (Latin immolare) came to mean "to sacrifice." Its use was one of the numerous religious traditions ascribed to Numa, the Sabine second king of Rome.

==== monstrum ====
A monstrum is a sign or portent that disrupts the natural order as evidence of divine displeasure. The word monstrum is usually assumed to derive, as Cicero says, from the verb monstro, "show" (compare English "demonstrate"), but according to Varro it comes from moneo, "warn." Because a sign must be startling or deviant to have an impact, monstrum came to mean "unnatural event" or "a malfunctioning of nature." Suetonius said that "a monstrum is contrary to nature (or exceeds the nature) we are familiar with, like a snake with feet or a bird with four wings." The Greek equivalent was teras. The English word "monster" derived from the negative sense of the word. Compare miraculum, ostentum, portentum, and prodigium.

In one of the most famous uses of the word in Latin literature, the Augustan poet Horace calls Cleopatra a fatale monstrum, something deadly and outside normal human bounds. Cicero calls Catiline monstrum atque prodigium and uses the phrase several times to insult various objects of his attacks as depraved and beyond the human pale. For Seneca, the monstrum is, like tragedy, "a visual and horrific revelation of the truth."

==== mundus ====
Literally "the world", also a pit supposedly dug and sealed by Romulus as part of Rome's foundation rites. Its interpretation is problematic; it was normally sealed, and was ritually opened only on three occasions during the year. Still, in the most ancient Fasti, these days were marked C(omitiales) (days when the Comitia met) suggesting the idea that the whole ritual was a later Greek import. However Cato and Varro as quoted by Macrobius considered them religiosi. When opened, the pit served as a cache for offerings to underworld deities, particularly Ceres, goddess of the fruitful earth. It offered a portal between the upper and lower worlds; its shape was said to be an inversion of the dome of the upper heavens.

=== N ===
==== nefandum ====
An adjective derived from nefas (following). The gerund of verb fari, to speak, is commonly used to form derivate or inflected forms of fas. See Virgil's fandi as genitive of fas. This use has been invoked to support the derivation of fas from IE root *bha, Latin fari.

==== nefas ====
Any thing or action contrary to divine law and will is nefas (in archaic legalese, ne (not) ... fas). Nefas forbids a thing as religiously and morally offensive, or indicates a failure to fulfill a religious duty. It might be nuanced as "a religious duty not to", as in Festus' statement that "a man condemned by the people for a heinous action is sacer" — that is, given over to the gods for judgment and disposal — "it is not a religious duty to execute him, but whoever kills him will not be prosecuted".

Livy records that the patricians opposed legislation that would allow a plebeian to hold the office of consul on the grounds that it was nefas: a plebeian, they claimed, would lack the arcane knowledge of religious matters that by tradition was a patrician prerogative. The plebeian tribune Gaius Canuleius, whose lex it was, retorted that it was arcane because the patricians kept it secret.

==== nefastus ====
Usually found with dies (singular or plural), as dies nefasti, days on which official transactions were forbidden on religious grounds. See also nefas, fasti and fas.

==== nemus ====
Nemus, plural nemora, was one of four Latin words that meant "forest, woodland, woods." Lucus is more strictly a sacred grove, as defined by Servius as "a large number of trees with a religious significance", and distinguished from the silva, a natural forest; saltus, territory that is wilderness; and a nemus, an arboretum that is not consecrated (but compare Celtic nemeton). In Latin poetry, a nemus is often a place conducive to poetic inspiration, and particularly in the Augustan period takes on a sacral aura.

Named nemora include:

- The nemus of Anna Perenna.
- Nemus Caesarum, dedicated to the memory of Augustus's grandsons Gaius and Lucius.
- The nemus Aricinum sacred to Diana, Egeria and Virbius.

==== nuntiatio ====
The chief responsibility of an augur was to observe signs (observatio) and to report the results (nuntiatio). The announcement was made before an assembly. A passage in Cicero states that the augur was entitled to report on the signs observed before or during an assembly and that the magistrates had the right to watch for signs (spectio) as well as make the announcement (nuntiatio) prior to the conducting of public business, but the exact significance of Cicero's distinction is a matter of scholarly debate.

=== O ===
==== obnuntiatio ====
Obnuntiatio was a declaration of unfavourable signs by an augur in order to suspend, cancel or postpone a proposed course of public action. The procedure could be carried out only by an official who had the right to observe omens (spectio).

The only source for the term is Cicero, himself an augur, who refers to it in several speeches as a religious bulwark against popularist politicians and tribunes. The Lex Aelia Fufia (ca. 150 BC) may have extended the right of obnuntiatio beyond the augural college to all magistrates. Legislation by Clodius as tribune of the plebs in 58 BC was aimed at ending the practice, or at least curtailing its potential for abuse; obnuntiatio had been exploited the previous year as an obstructionist tactic by Julius Caesar's consular colleague Bibulus. That the Clodian law had not deprived all augurs or magistrates of the privilege is indicated by Mark Antony's use of obnuntatio in early 44 BC to halt the consular election.

==== observatio ====
Observatio was the interpretation of signs according to the tradition of the "Etruscan discipline", or as preserved in books such as the libri augurales. A haruspex interpreted fulgura (thunder and lightning) and exta (entrails) by observatio. The word has three closely related meanings in augury: the observing of signs by an augur or other diviner; the process of observing, recording, and establishing the meaning of signs over time; and the codified body of knowledge accumulated by systematic observation, that is, "unbending rules" regarded as objective, or external to an individual's observation on a given occasion. Impetrative signs, or those sought by standard augural procedure, were interpreted according to observatio; the observer had little or no latitude in how they might be interpreted. Observatio might also be applicable to many oblative or unexpected signs. Observatio was considered a kind of scientia, or "scientific" knowledge, in contrast to coniectura, a more speculative "art" or "method" (ars) as required by novel signs.

==== omen ====
An omen, plural omina, was a sign intimating the future, considered less important to the community than a prodigium but of great importance to the person who heard or saw it. Omens could be good or bad. Unlike prodigia, bad omens were never expiated by public rites but could be reinterpreted, redirected or otherwise averted (see abominari).

==== ostentarium ====
One form of arcane literature was the ostentarium, a written collection describing and interpreting signs (ostenta). Tarquitius Priscus wrote an Ostentarium arborarium, a book on signs pertaining to trees, and an Ostentarium Tuscum, presumably translations of Etruscan works. Pliny cites his contemporary Umbricius Melior for an ostentarium aviarium, concerning birds. They were consulted until late antiquity; in the 4th century, for instance, the haruspices consulted the books of Tarquitius before the battle that proved fatal to the emperor Julian — according to Ammianus Marcellinus, because he failed to heed them. Fragments of ostentaria survive as quotations in other literary works.

==== ostentum ====
According to Varro, an ostentum is a sign so called because it shows (ostendit) something to a person. Suetonius specified that "an ostentum shows itself to us without possessing a solid body and affects both our eyes and ears, like darkness or a light at night." In his classic work on Roman divination, Auguste Bouché-Leclercq thus tried to distinguish theoretical usage of ostenta and portenta as applying to inanimate objects, monstra to biological signs, and prodigia for human acts or movements, but in non-technical writing the words tend to be used more loosely as synonyms.

The theory of ostenta, portenta and monstra constituted one of the three branches of interpretation within the disciplina Etrusca, the other two being the more specific fulgura (thunder and lightning) and exta (entrails). Ostenta and portenta are not the signs that augurs are trained to solicit and interpret, but rather "new signs", the meaning of which had to be figured out through ratio (the application of analytical principles) and coniectura (more speculative reasoning, in contrast to augural observatio).

==== ordo sacerdotum ====
A religious hierarchy implied by the seating arrangements of priests (sacerdotes) at sacrificial banquets. As "the most powerful", the rex sacrorum was positioned next to the gods, followed by the Flamen Dialis, then the Flamen Martialis, then the Flamen Quirinalis and lastly, the Pontifex Maximus. The ordo sacerdotum observed and preserved ritual distinctions between divine and human power. In the human world, the Pontifex Maximus was the most influential and powerful of all sacerdotes.

=== P ===
==== paludatus ====
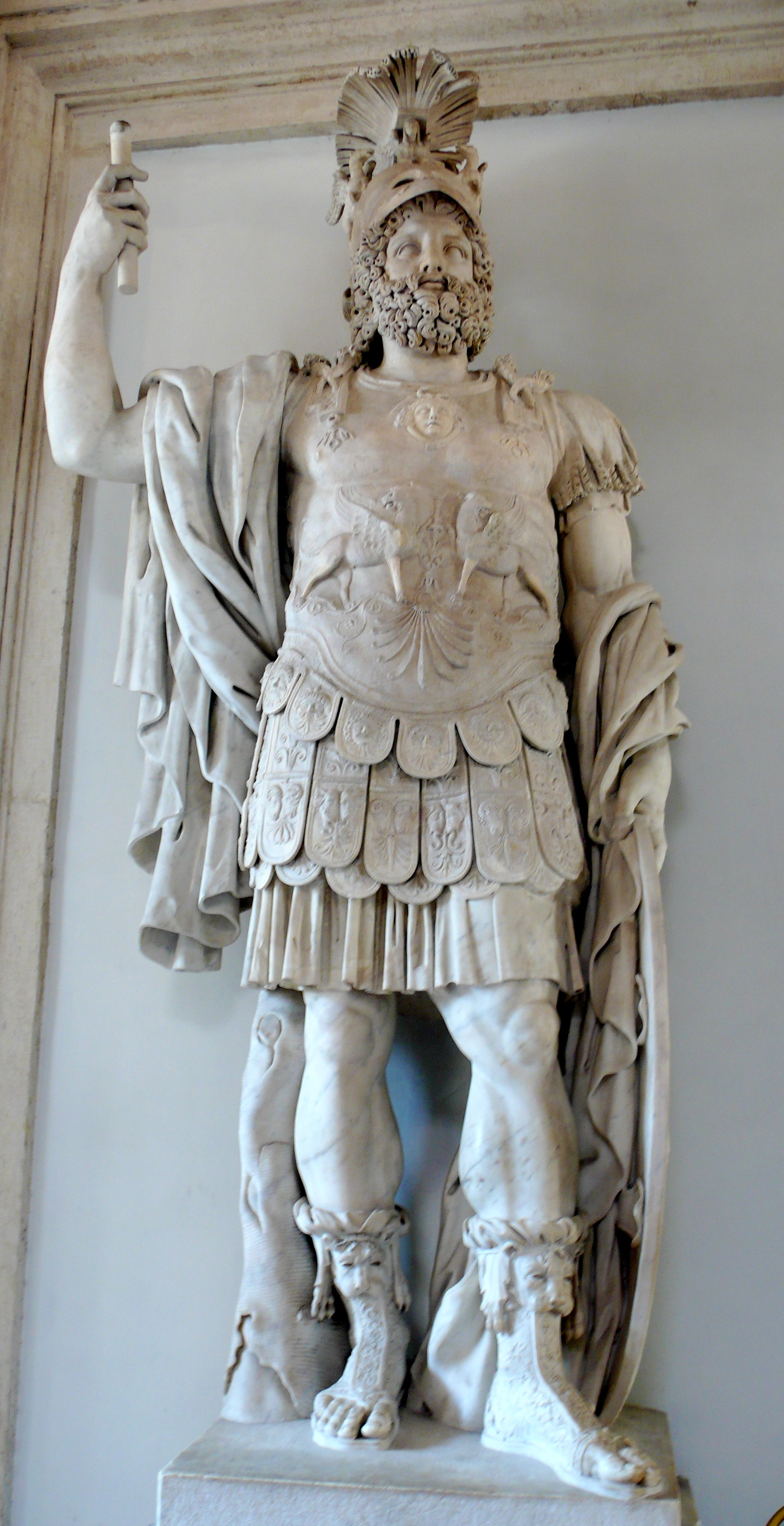
Mars wearing the paludamentum

Paludatus (masculine singular, plural paludati) is an adjective meaning "wearing the paludamentum," the distinctive attire of the Roman military commander. Varro and Festus say that any military ornament could be called a paludamentum, but other sources indicate that the cloak was primarily meant. According to Festus, paludati in the augural books meant "armed and adorned" (armati, ornati). As the commander crossed from the sacred boundary of Rome (pomerium), he was paludatus, adorned with the attire he would wear to lead a battle and for official business. This adornment was thus part of the commander's ritual investiture with imperium. It followed upon the sacrifices and vows the commander offered up on the Capitol, and was concomitant with his possession of the auspices for war.

Festus notes elsewhere that the "Salian virgins", whose relation to the Salian priests is unclear, performed their rituals paludatae, dressed in military garb.

==== pax deorum ====
Pax, though usually translated into English as "peace", was a compact, bargain, or agreement. In religious usage, the harmony or accord between the divine and human was the pax deorum or pax divom ("the peace of the gods" or "divine peace"). Pax deorum was only given in return for correct religious practice. Religious error (vitium) and impiety led to divine disharmony and ira deorum (the anger of the gods).

==== piaculum ====
A piaculum is an expiatory sacrifice, or the victim used in the sacrifice; also, an act requiring expiation.

Because Roman religion was contractual (do ut des), a piaculum might be offered as a sort of advance payment; the Arval Brethren, for instance, offered a piaculum before entering their sacred grove with an iron implement, which was forbidden, as well as after. The pig was a common victim for a piaculum. The Augustan historian Livy says P. Decius Mus is "like" a piaculum when he makes his vow to sacrifice himself in battle (see devotio).

==== pietas ====
Pietas, from which English "piety" derives, was the devotion that bound a person to the gods, to the Roman state, and to his family. It was the outstanding quality of the Roman hero Aeneas, to whom the epithet pius is applied regularly throughout the Aeneid.

==== pius ====
In Latin and other Italic languages, pius seems to have meant "that which is in accord with divine law." Later it was used to designate actions respectful of divine law and even people who acted with respect towards gods and godly rules. The pius person "strictly conforms his life to the ius divinum." "Dutiful" is often a better translation of the adjective than the English derivative "pious." Pius is a regular epithet of the Roman founding hero Aeneas in Virgil's Aeneid, along with pater, "father." See also pietas, the related abstract noun.

==== pollucere ====
A verb of unknown etymology meaning "to consecrate."

==== pontifex ====
The pontifex was a priest of the highest-ranking college. The chief among the pontifices was the Pontifex Maximus. The word has been considered as related to pons, bridge, either because of the religious meaning of the pons Sublicius and its ritual use (which has a parallel in Thebae and in its gephiarioi) or in the original IE meaning of way. Pontifex in this case would be the "opener of the way" corresponding to the Vedic adharvayu, the only active and moving sacerdos in the sacrificial group who takes his title from the figurative designation of liturgy as a way.

Another hypothesis considers the word as a loan from the Sabine language, in which it would mean a member of a college of five people, from Osco-Umbrian ponte, five. This explanation takes into account that the college was established by Sabine king Numa Pompilius and the institution is Italic: the expressions pontis and pomperias found in the Iguvine Tablets may denote a group or division of five or by five. The pontifex would thus be a member of a sacrificial college known as pomperia (Latin quinio).

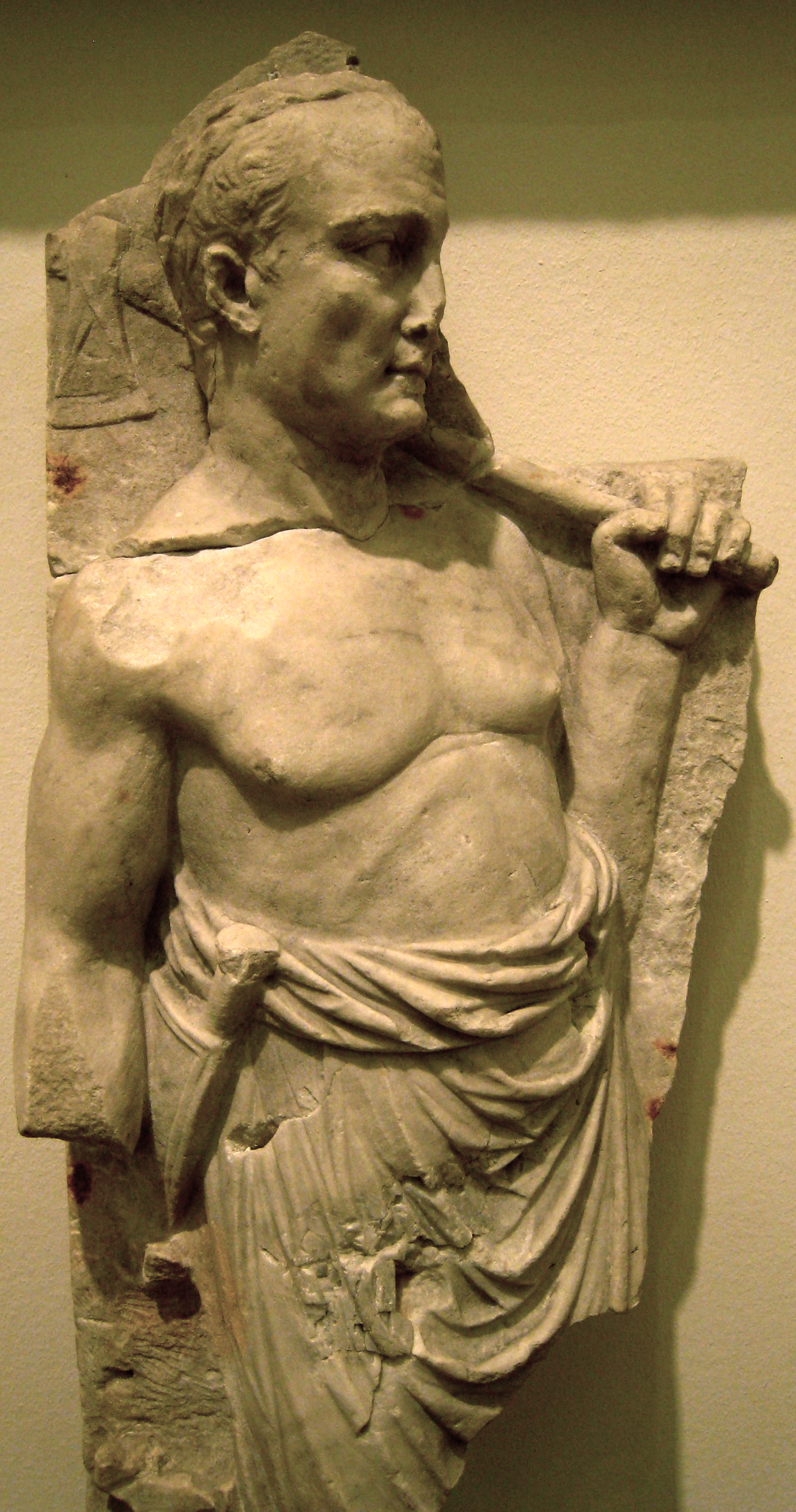
Attendant at a sacrifice with ax

==== popa ====
The popa was one of the lesser-rank officiants at a sacrifice. In depictions of sacrificial processions, he carries a mallet or axe with which to strike the animal victim. Literary sources in late antiquity say that the popa was a public slave. See also victimarius.

==== porricere ====
The verb porricere had the specialized religious meaning "to offer as a sacrifice," especially to offer the sacrificial entrails (exta) to the gods. Both exta porricere and exta dare referred to the process by which the entrails were cooked, cut into pieces, and burnt on the altar. The Arval Brethren used the term exta reddere, "to return the entrails," that is, to render unto the deity what has already been given as due.

==== portentum ====
A portentum is a kind of sign interpreted by a haruspex, not an augur, and by means of coniectura rather than observatio. Portentum is a close but not always exact synonym of ostentum, prodigium, and monstrum. Cicero uses portentum frequently in his treatise De divinatione, where it seems to be a generic word for prodigies. The word could also refer in non-technical usage to an unnatural occurrence without specific religious significance; for instance, Pliny calls an Egyptian with a pair of non-functional eyes on the back of his head a portentum. Varro derives portentum from the verb portendere because it portends something that is going to happen.

In the schema of A. Bouché-Leclercq, portenta and ostenta are the two types of signs that appear in inanimate nature, as distinguished from the monstrum (a biological singularity), prodigia (the unique acts or movements of living beings), and a miraculum, a non-technical term that emphasizes the viewer's reaction. The sense of portentum has also been distinguished from that of ostentum by relative duration of time, with the ostentum of briefer manifestation.

Although the English word "portent" derives from portentum and may be used to translate it, other Latin terms such as ostentum and prodigium will also be found translated as "portent". Portentum offers an example of an ancient Roman religious term modified for Christian usage; in the Christian theology of miracles, a portentum occurring by the will of the Christian God could not be regarded as contrary to nature (contra naturam), thus Augustine specified that if such a sign appeared to be unnatural, it was only because it was contrary to nature as known (nota) by human beings.

==== precatio ====
The precatio was the formal addressing of the deity or deities in a ritual. The word is related by etymology to prex, "prayer" (plural preces), and usually translated as if synonymous. Pliny says that the slaughter of a sacrificial victim is ineffectual without precatio, the recitation of the prayer formula. Priestly texts that were collections of prayers were sometimes called precationes.

Two late examples of the precatio are the Precatio Terrae Matris ("The Prayer of Mother Earth") and the Precatio omnium herbarum ("Prayer of All the Herbs"), which are charms or carmina written metrically, the latter attached to the medical writings attributed to Antonius Musa. Dirae precationes were "dire" prayers, that is, imprecations or curses.

In augural procedure, precatio is not a prayer proper, but a form of invocation (invocatio) recited at the beginning of a ceremony or after accepting an oblative sign. The precatio maxima was recited for the augurium salutis, the ritual conducted by the augurs to obtain divine permission to pray for Rome's security (salus).

In legal and rhetorical usage, precatio was a plea or request.

==== prex ====
Prex, "prayer", usually appears in the plural, preces. Within the tripartite structure that was often characteristic of formal ancient prayer, preces would be the final expression of what is sought from the deity, following the invocation and a narrative middle. A legitimate request is an example of bonae preces, "good prayer." Tacitae preces are silent or sotto voce prayers as might be used in private ritual or magic; preces with a negative intent are described with adjectives such as Thyesteae ("Thyestean"), funestae ("deadly"), infelices (aimed at causing unhappiness), nefariae, or dirae.

In general usage, preces could refer to any request or entreaty. The verbal form is precor, precari, "pray, entreat." The Umbrian cognate is persklu, "supplication." The meaning may be "I try and obtain by uttering appropriate words what is my right to obtain." It is used often in association with quaeso in expressions such as te precor quaesoque, "I pray and beseech you", or prece quaesit, "he seeks by means of prayer." In Roman law of the Imperial era, preces referred to a petition addressed to the emperor by a private person.

==== prodigium ====
Prodigia (plural) were unnatural deviations from the predictable order of the cosmos. A prodigium signaled divine displeasure at a religious offense and must be expiated to avert more destructive expressions of divine wrath. Compare ostentum and portentum, signs denoting an extraordinary inanimate phenomenon, and monstrum and miraculum, an unnatural feature in humans.

Prodigies were a type of auspicia oblativa; that is, they were "thrust upon" observers, not deliberately sought. Suspected prodigies were reported as a civic duty. A system of official referrals filtered out those that seemed patently insignificant or false before the rest were reported to the senate, who held further inquiry; this procedure was the procuratio prodigiorum. Prodigies confirmed as genuine were referred to the pontiffs and augurs for ritual expiation. For particularly serious or difficult cases, the decemviri sacris faciundis could seek guidance and suggestions from the Sibylline Books.

The number of confirmed prodigies rose in troubled times. In 207 BC, during one of the worst crises of the Punic Wars, the senate dealt with an unprecedented number, the expiation of which would have involved "at least twenty days" of dedicated rites. Major prodigies that year included the spontaneous combustion of weapons, the apparent shrinking of the sun's disc, two moons in a daylit sky, a cosmic battle between sun and moon, a rain of red-hot stones, a bloody sweat on statues, and blood in fountains and on ears of corn. These were expiated by the sacrifice of "greater victims". The minor prodigies were less warlike but equally unnatural; sheep became goats; a hen become a cock, and vice versa. The minor prodigies were duly expiated with "lesser victims". The discovery of a hermaphroditic four-year-old child was expiated by drowning and a holy procession of 27 virgins to the temple of Juno Regina, singing a hymn to avert disaster; a lightning strike during the hymn rehearsals required further expiation. Religious restitution was proved only by Rome's victory.

The expiatory burial of living human victims in the Forum Boarium followed Rome's defeat at Cannae in the same wars. In Livy's account, Rome's victory follows its discharge of religious duties to the gods. Livy remarked the scarcity of prodigies in his own day as a loss of communication between gods and men. In the later Republic and thereafter, the reporting of public prodigies was increasingly displaced by a "new interest in signs and omens associated with the charismatic individual."

==== profanum ====
Profanum (literally, 'in front of the shrine'), therefore not within a sacred precinct; not belonging to the gods but to humankind.

==== propitius ====
An adjective of augural terminology meaning favourable. From pro-, "before", and petere, "seek" but originally "fly". It indicates a pattern in the flight of praepetes aves, birds that make the auspices favorable by flying before the person who is taking them or by pointing in the direction of that which is wished for. A synonym is secundus, "favorable" or "following".

==== pulvinar ====
The pulvinar (plural pulvinaria) was a special couch used for displaying images of the gods, that they might receive offerings at ceremonies such as the lectisternium or supplicatio. In the famous lectisternium of 217 BC, on orders of the Sibylline books, six pulvinaria were arranged, each for a divine male-female pair. By extension, pulvinar can also mean the shrine or platform housing several of these couches and their images. At the Circus Maximus, the couches and images of the gods were placed on an elevated pulvinar to "watch" the games.

=== R ===
==== regina sacrorum ====
The regina sacrorum is the wife of the rex sacrorum, who served as a high priestess with her own specific religious duties.

==== religio ====
The word religio originally meant an obligation to the gods, something expected by them from human beings or a matter of particular care or concern as related to the gods. In this sense, religio might be translated better as "religious scruple" than with the English word "religion". One definition of religio offered by Cicero is cultus deorum, "the proper performance of rites in veneration of the gods."

Religio among the Romans was not based on "faith", but on knowledge, including and especially correct practice. Religio (plural religiones) was the pious practice of Rome's traditional cults, and was a cornerstone of the mos maiorum, the traditional social norms that regulated public, private, and military life. To the Romans, their success was self-evidently due to their practice of proper, respectful religio, which gave the gods what was owed them and which was rewarded with social harmony, peace and prosperity.

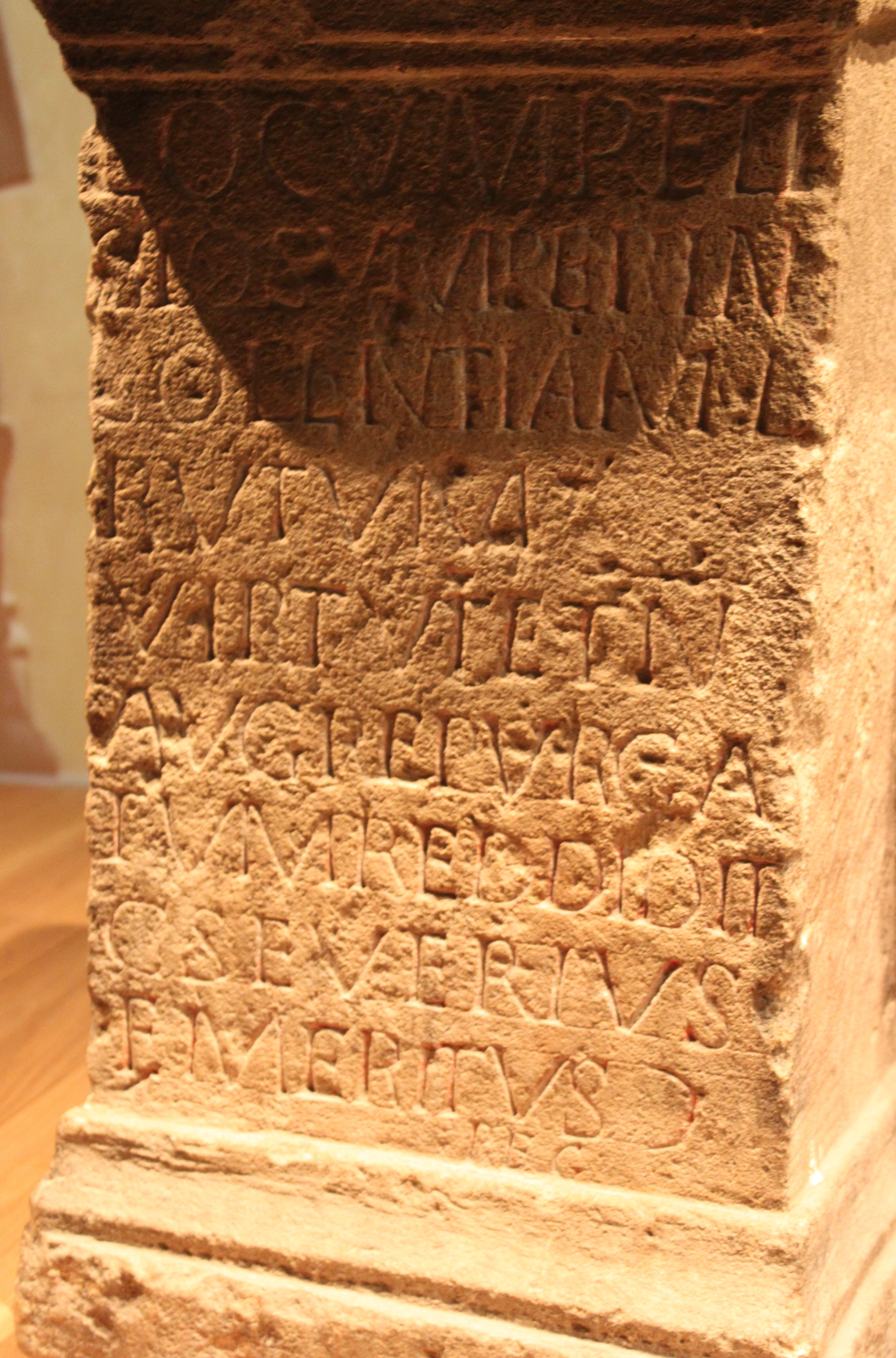
Dedication from Roman Britain announcing that a local official has restored a locus religiosus

Religious law maintained the proprieties of divine honours, sacrifice and ritual. Impure sacrifice and incorrect ritual were vitia (faults, hence "vice," the English derivative); excessive devotion, fearful grovelling to deities, and the improper use or seeking of divine knowledge were superstitio; neglecting the religiones owed to the traditional gods was atheism, a charge leveled during the Empire at Jews, Christians, and Epicureans. Any of these moral deviations could cause divine anger (ira deorum) and therefore harm the State. See Religion in ancient Rome.

==== religiosus ====
Religiosus was something pertaining to the gods or marked out by them as theirs, as distinct from sacer, which was something or someone given to them by humans. Hence, a graveyard was not primarily defined as sacer but a locus religiosus, because those who lay within its boundaries were considered belonging to the di Manes. Places struck by lightning were taboo because they had been marked as religiosus by Jupiter himself. See also sacer and sanctus.

==== res divinae ====
Res divinae were "divine affairs," that is, the matters that pertained to the gods and the sphere of the divine in contrast to res humanae, "human affairs." Rem divinam facere, "to do a divine thing," simply meant to do something that pertained to the divine sphere, such as perform a ceremony or rite. The equivalent Etruscan term is ais(u)na.

The distinction between human and divine res was explored in the multivolume Antiquitates rerum humanarum et divinarum, one of the chief works of Varro (1st century BC). It survives only in fragments but was a major source of traditional Roman theology for the Church Fathers. Varro devoted 25 books of the Antiquitates to res humanae and 16 to res divinae. His proportional emphasis is deliberate, as he treats cult and ritual as human constructs. Varro divides res divinae into three kinds:

- the mythic theology of the poets, or narrative elaboration;
- the natural theology of the philosophers, or theorizing on divinity among the intellectual elite;
- the civil theology concerned with the relation of the state to the divine.

The schema is Stoic in origin, though Varro has adapted it for his own purposes.

Res divinae is an example of ancient Roman religious terminology that was appropriated for Christian usage; for St. Augustine, res divina is a "divine reality" as represented by a sacrum signum ("sacred sign") such as a sacrament.

==== responsum ====
Responsa (plural) were the "responses," that is, the opinions and arguments, of the official priests on questions of religious practice and interpretation. These were preserved in written form and archived. Compare decretum.

==== rex sacrorum ====
The rex sacrorum was a senatorial priesthood reserved for patricians. Although in the historical era the Pontifex Maximus was the head of Roman state religion, Festus says that in the ranking of priests, the rex sacrorum was of highest prestige, followed by the flamines maiores.

==== ritus ====
Although ritus is the origin of the English word "rite" via ecclesiastical Latin, in classical usage ritus meant the traditional and correct manner (of performance), that is, "way, custom". Festus defines it as a specific form of mos: "Ritus is the proven way (mos) in the performance of sacrifices." The adverb rite means "in good form, correctly." This original meaning of ritus may be compared to the concept of ṛtá ("visible order", in contrast to dhāman, dhārman) in Vedic religion, a conceptual pairing analogous to Latin fas and ius.

For Latin words meaning "ritual" or "rite", see sacra, caerimoniae, and religiones.

==== ritus graecus ====
A small number of Roman religious practices and cult innovations were carried out according to "Greek rite" (ritus graecus), which the Romans characterized as Greek in origin or manner. A priest who conducted ritu graeco wore a Greek-style fringed tunic, with his head bare (capite aperto) or laurel-wreathed. By contrast, in most rites of Roman public religion, an officiant wore the distinctively Roman toga, specially folded to cover his head (see capite velato). Otherwise, "Greek rite" seems to have been a somewhat indefinite category, used for prayers uttered in Greek, and Greek methods of sacrifice within otherwise conventionally Roman cult.

Roman writers record elements of ritus graecus in the cult to Hercules at Rome's Ara Maxima, which according to tradition was established by the Greek king Evander even before the city of Rome was founded at the site. It thus represented one of the most ancient Roman cults. "Greek" elements were also found in the Saturnalia held in honor of the Golden Age deity Saturn, and in certain ceremonies of the Ludi saeculares. A Greek rite to Ceres (ritus graecus cereris) was imported from Magna Graecia and added to her existing Aventine cult in accordance with the Sibylline books, ancient oracles written in Greek. Official rites to Apollo are perhaps "the best illustration of the Graecus ritus in Rome."

The Romans regarded ritus graecus as part of their own mos maiorum (ancestral tradition), and not as novus aut externus ritus, novel or foreign rite. The thorough integration and reception of rite labeled "Greek" attests to the complex, multi-ethnic origins of Rome's people and religious life.

=== S ===
==== sacellum ====
Sacellum, a diminutive from sacer ("belonging to a god"), is a shrine. Varro and Verrius Flaccus give explanations that seem contradictory, the former defining a sacellum in its entirety as equivalent to a cella, which is specifically an enclosed space, and the latter insisting that a sacellum had no roof. "The sacellum," notes Jörg Rüpke, "was both less complex and less elaborately defined than a temple proper." Each curia had its own sacellum.

==== sacer ====
Sacer describes a thing or person given to the gods, thus "sacred" to them. Human beings had no legal or moral claims on anything sacer. Sacer could be highly nuanced; Varro associates it with "perfection". Through association with ritual purity, sacer could also mean "sacred, untouchable, inviolable".

Anything not sacer was profanum: literally, "in front of (or outside) the shrine", therefore not belonging to it or the gods. A thing or person could be made sacer (consecrated), or could revert from sacer to profanum (deconsecrated), only through lawful rites (resecratio) performed by a pontiff on behalf of the state. Part of the ver sacrum sacrificial vow of 217 BC stipulated that animals dedicated as sacer would revert to the condition of profanum if they died through natural cause or were stolen before the due sacrificial date. Similar conditions attached to sacrifices in archaic Rome. A thing already owned by the gods or actively marked out by them as divine property was distinguished as religiosus, and hence could not be given to them or made sacer.

Persons judged sacer under Roman law were placed beyond further civil judgment, sentence and protection; their lives, families and properties were forfeit to the gods. A person could be declared sacer who harmed a plebeian tribune, failed to bear legal witness, failed to meet his obligations to clients, or illicitly moved the boundary markers of fields. It was not a religious duty (fas) to execute a homo sacer, but he could be killed with impunity.

Dies sacri ("sacred days") were nefasti, meaning that the ordinary human affairs permitted on dies profani (or fasti) were forbidden.

Sacer was a fundamental principle in Roman and Italic religions. In Oscan, cognate forms are sakoro, "sacred," and sakrim, "sacrificial victim". Oscan sakaraklum is cognate with Latin sacellum, a small shrine, as Oscan sakarater is with Latin sacratur, consecrare, "consecrated". The sacerdos is "one who performs a sacred action" or "renders a thing sacred", that is, a priest.

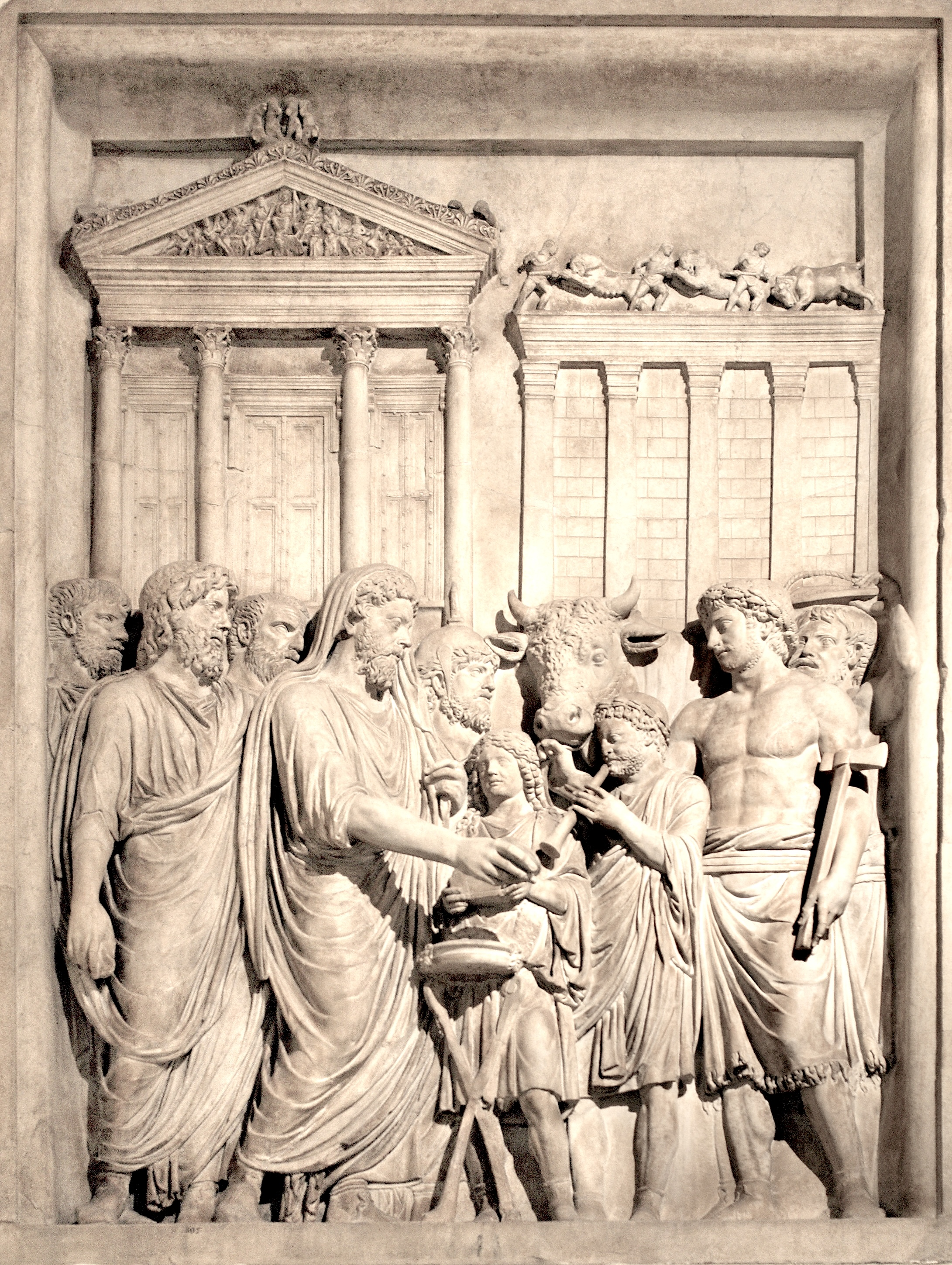
Marcus Aurelius capite velato carries out a sacrifice. By his left side is a flamen wearing an apex. The victima is the bull, who will be struck by the popa to the right. The music of the aulos was to drive off inauspicious noise. The setting is the Temple of Capitoline Jupiter.

==== sacerdos ====
A sacerdos (plural sacerdotes, a word of either masculine or feminine gender) was any priest or priestess, from *sakro-dho-ts, "the one who does the sacred act." There was no priestly caste in ancient Rome, and in some sense every citizen was a priest in that he presided over the domestic cult of his household. Senators, magistrates, and the decurions of towns performed ritual acts, though they were not sacerdotes per se. The sacerdos was one who held the title usually in relation to a specific deity or temple. See also collegium and flamen.

==== sacra ====
Sacra (neuter plural of sacer) are the traditional cult practices of classical Roman religion, either publica or privata, both of which were overseen by the College of Pontiffs.

The sacra publica were those performed on behalf of the whole Roman people or its major subdivisions, the tribes and curiae. They included the sacra pro populo, "rites on behalf of the Roman people," i.e., all the feriae publicae of the Roman calendar year and the other feasts that were regarded of public interest, including those pertaining to the hills of Rome, to the pagi and curiae, and to the sacella, "shrines". The establishment of the sacra publica is ascribed to king Numa Pompilius, but many are thought to be of earlier origin, even predating the founding of Rome. Thus Numa may be seen as carrying out a reform and a reorganisation of the sacra in accord with his own views and his education. Sacra publica were performed at the expense of the state, according to the dispositions left by Numa, and were attended by all the senators and magistrates.

Sacra privata were particular to a gens, to a family, or to an individual, and were carried out at the expense of those concerned. Individuals had sacra on dates peculiar to them, such as birthdays, the dies lustricus, and at other times of their life such as funerals and expiations, for instance of fulgurations. Families had their own sacra in the home or at the tombs of their ancestors, such as those pertaining to the Lares, Manes and Penates of the family, and the Parentalia. These were regarded as necessary and imperishable, and the desire to perpetuate the family's sacra was among the reasons for adoption in adulthood. In some cases, the state assumed the expenses even of sacra privata, if they were regarded as important to the maintenance of the Roman religious system as a whole; see sacra gentilicia following.

==== sacra gentilicia ====
Sacra gentilicia were the private rites (see sacra above) that were particular to a gens ("clan"). These rites are related to a belief in the shared ancestry of the members of a gens, since the Romans placed a high value on both family identity and commemorating the dead. During the Gallic siege of Rome, a member of the gens Fabia risked his life to carry out the sacra of his clan on the Quirinal Hill; the Gauls were so impressed by his courageous piety that they allowed him to pass through their lines. The Fabian sacra were performed in Gabine dress by a member of the gens who was possibly named a flamen. There were sacra of Minerva in the care of the Nautii, and rites of Apollo that the Iulii oversaw. The Claudii had recourse to a distinctive "propudial pig" sacrifice (propudialis porcus, "pig of shame") by way of expiation when they neglected any of their religious obligations.

Roman practices of adoption, including so-called "testamentary adoption" when an adult heir was declared in a will, were aimed at perpetuating the sacra gentilicia as well as preserving the family name and property. A person adopted into another family usually renounced the sacra of his birth (see detestatio sacrorum) in order to devote himself to those of his new family.

Sacra gentilicia sometimes acquired public importance, and if the gens were in danger of dying out, the state might take over their maintenance. One of the myths attached to Hercules' time in Italy explained why his cult at the Ara Maxima was in the care of the patrician gens Potitia and the gens Pinaria; the diminution of these families by 312 BC caused the sacra to be transferred to the keeping of public slaves and supported with public funding.

==== sacra municipalia ====
The sacra of an Italian town or community (municipium) might be perpetuated under the supervision of the Roman pontiffs when the locality was brought under Roman rule. Festus defined municipalia sacra as "those owned originally, before the granting of Roman citizenship; the pontiffs desired that the people continue to observe them and to practice them in the way (mos) they had been accustomed to from ancient times." These sacra were regarded as preserving the core religious identity of a particular people.

==== sacramentum ====
Sacramentum is an oath or vow that rendered the swearer sacer, "given to the gods," in the negative sense if he violated it. Sacramentum also referred to a thing that was pledged as a sacred bond, and consequently forfeit if the oath were violated. Both instances imply an underlying sacratio, act of consecration.

In Roman law, a thing given as a pledge or bond was a sacramentum. The sacramentum legis actio was a sum of money deposited in a legal procedure to affirm that both parties to the litigation were acting in good faith. If correct law and procedures had been followed, it could be assumed that the outcome was iustum, right or valid. The losing side had thus in effect committed perjury, and forfeited his sacramentum as a form of piaculum; the winner got his deposit back. The forfeited sacramentum was normally allotted by the state to the funding of sacra publica.

The sacramentum militare (also as militum or militiae) was the oath taken by soldiers in pledging their loyalty to the consul or emperor. The sacramentum that renders the soldier sacer helps explain why he was subjected to harsher penalties, such as execution and corporal punishment, that were considered inappropriate for civilian citizens, at least under the Republic. In effect, he had put his life on deposit, a condition also of the fearsome sacramentum sworn by gladiators. In the later empire, the oath of loyalty created conflict for Christians serving in the military, and produced a number of soldier-martyrs. Sacramentum is the origin of the English word "sacrament", a transition in meaning pointed to by Apuleius's use of the word to refer to religious initiation.

The sacramentum as pertaining to both the military and the law indicates the religious basis for these institutions. The term differs from iusiurandum, which is more common in legal application, as for instance swearing an oath in court. A sacramentum establishes a direct relation between the person swearing (or the thing pledged in the swearing of the oath) and the gods; the iusiurandum is an oath of good faith within the human community that is in accordance with ius as witnessed by the gods.

==== sacrarium ====
A sacrarium was a place where sacred objects (sacra) were stored or deposited for safekeeping. The word can overlap in meaning with sacellum, a small enclosed shrine; the sacella of the Argei are also called sacraria. In Greek writers, the word is ἱεροφυλάκιον hierophylakion (hiero-, "sacred" and phylakion, something that safeguards). See sacellum for a list of sacraria.

The sacrarium of a private home lent itself to Christian transformation, as a 4th-century poem by Ausonius demonstrates; in contemporary Christian usage, the sacrarium is a "special sink used for the reverent disposal of sacred substances" (see piscina).

==== sacrificium ====
An event or thing dedicated to the gods for their disposal. The offer of sacrifice is fundamental to religio. See also Sacer and Religion in ancient Rome: Sacrifice.

==== sacrosanctus ====
The Valerio-Horatian laws of 449 BC introduced the adjective sacrosanctus to define the inviolability of the power (potestas) of the tribunes of the plebs and of other magistrates sanctioned by law (Livy 3.55.1). The sacrality of the tribune's function had been established in earlier times through a religio and a sacramentum (Livy 2.33.1; 3.19.10), but it obliged only the contracting parties. To make it an obligation for everyone required a sanctio that was not only civil but religious: the trespasser was to be declared sacer, and his family and property sold, according to the Greek historian Dionysius (6.89.3). Sacer thus defined the religious compact, and sanctus the law. According to other passages in Livy, the law was not approved of by some jurists of the time, who maintained that only those who infringed the commonly recognised divine laws could fall into the category of those to be declared sacri. Elsewhere Livy states (Livy 4.3.6, 44.5; 20.20.11) that only the potestas and not the person of the tribune was sacrosancta. The critics of the law objected, "These people postulate they themselves should be sacrosancti, they who do not hold even gods for sacred and saint?"

H. Fugier gives the meaning of sacrosanctus as guaranteed by an oath, but M. Morani interprets the first part of the compound as a consequence of the second: sanxit tribunum sacrum, the tribune is sanctioned by the law as sacer. This kind of word composition based on an etymological figure has parallels in other IE languages in archaic constructions.

==== Salii ====
The Salii were the "leaping priests" of Mars.

==== sancio ====
A verb meaning to ratify a compact and put it under the protection of a sanctio, a sanction or penalty. The formation and original meaning of the verb are debated. Some scholars think it is derived from the IE stem *sak (the same as sacer) through the insertion of a nasal n infix and the suffix -yo. Thence sancio would mean to render something sacer, i.e. belonging to the gods in the sense of having their guarantee and protection. Others think it is a derivation from the theonym Sancus, the god of the ratification of foedera (treaties) and the protection of good faith, from the root sancu- plus suffix -io. In that case, the verb would mean an act that reflects or conforms to the function of this god, i.e. the ratifying and guaranteeing of compacts.

==== sanctus ====
Sanctus, an adjective formed on the past participle of the verb sancio, describes that which has been "established as inviolable" or "sacred", most times in a sense different from that of sacer and religiosus. Its original meaning would be "that which is protected by a sanction" (sanctio). The concept is connected to the name of the Umbrian or Sabine founder-deity Sancus, in Umbrian Sancius, whose most noted function was the ratifying and protecting of treaties (foedera).

The Roman jurist Ulpian distinguishes sanctus as "neither sacred (sacer) nor profane (profanum) ... nor [is it] religiosus." Gaius writes that a building dedicated to a god is sacrum, but a town's wall and gate are res sanctae because they belong "in some way" to divine law, while a graveyard is religiosus because it is relinquished to the di Manes. Some scholars think that sanctus was originally a concept related to space as concerning inaugurated places, because they enjoyed the armed protection (sanctio) of the gods.

Various deities, objects, places and people – especially senators and magistrates – can be sanctus. Claudia Quinta is described as a sanctissima femina (most virtuous woman) and Cato the Younger as a sanctus civis (a morally upright citizen). See also sanctuary.

Later the epithet sanctus is given to many gods including Apollo Pythius by Naevius, Venus and Tiberinus by Ennius and Livy. Ennius renders the Homeric dia theaoon as sancta dearum. In the early Imperial era, Ovid describes Terminus, the god who sanctifies land boundaries, as sanctus and equates sancta with augusta (august). The use of sanctus as an epithet of the river Tiber and of the boundary god Terminus retains the original and ancient sense of delineating space: borders are sancti by definition, and rivers often mark borders.

Sanctus as applied to people over time came to share some of the sense of Latin castus (morally pure or guiltless) and pius (pious), with none of the ambiguity attached to sacer and religiosus.

In ecclesiastical Latin, sanctus is the word for saint, but even in the Christian era it continues to appear in epitaphs for people who had not converted to Christianity.

==== servare de caelo ====
Literally, "to watch (for something) from the sky"; that is, to observe the templum of the sky for signs that might be interpreted as auspices. Bad omens resulted in a report of obnuntiatio.

==== signum ====
A signum is a "sign, token or indication". In religious use, signum provides a collective term for events or things (including signs and symbols) that designate divine identity, activity or communication, including prodigia, auspicia, omina, portenta and ostenta.

==== silentium ====
Silence was generally required in the performance of every religious ritual. The ritual injunction favete linguis, "be favourable with your tongues," meant "keep silent." In particular, silence assured the ritual correctness and the absence of vitia, "faults," in the taking of the auspices. It was also required in the nomination (dictio) of the dictator.

==== sinister ====
In ancient times, augurs (augures ex caelo) faced south, so the happy orient, where the sun rose, lay at their left. Consequently, the word sinister (Latin for left) meant well-fated. When, under Greek influence, it became customary for augurs to face north, sinister came to indicate the ill-fated west, where light turned into darkness. It is this latter and later meaning that is attached to the English word sinister.

==== sodalitas ====
A sodalitas was a form of voluntary association or society. Its meaning is not necessarily distinct from collegium in ancient sources, and is found also in sodalicium, "fraternity." The sodalis is a member of a sodalitas, which describes the relationship among sodales rather than an institution. Examples of priestly sodalitates are the Luperci, fetiales, Arval brothers and Titii; these are also called collegia, but that they were a kind of confraternity is suggested by the distinctive convivial song associated with some. An association of sodales might also form a burial society, or make religious dedications as a group; inscriptions record donations made by women for the benefit of sodales. Roman Pythagoreans such as Nigidius Figulus formed sodalicia, with which Ammianus Marcellinus compared the fellowship (sodalicia consortia) of the druids in Gallo-Roman culture. When the cult of Cybele was imported to Rome, the eunuchism of her priests the galli discouraged Roman men from forming an official priesthood; instead, they joined sodalitates to hold banquets and other forms of traditional Roman cultus in her honor.

The sodalitates are thought to originate as aristocratic brotherhoods with cultic duties, and their existence is attested as early as the late 6th or early 5th century BC. The Twelve Tables regulated their potential influence by forbidding them to come in conflict with public law (ius publicum). During the 60s BC, certain forms of associations were disbanded by law as politically disruptive, and in Ciceronian usage sodalitates may refer either to these subversive organizations or in a religious context to the priestly fraternities. See also Sodales Augustales. For the Catholic concept, see sodality.

==== spectio ====
Spectio ("watching, sighting, observation") was the seeking of omens through observing the sky, the flight of birds, or the feeding of birds. Originally only patrician magistrates and augurs were entitled to practice spectio, which carried with it the power to regulate assemblies and other aspects of public life, depending on whether the omens were good or bad. See also obnuntiatio.

==== sponsio ====
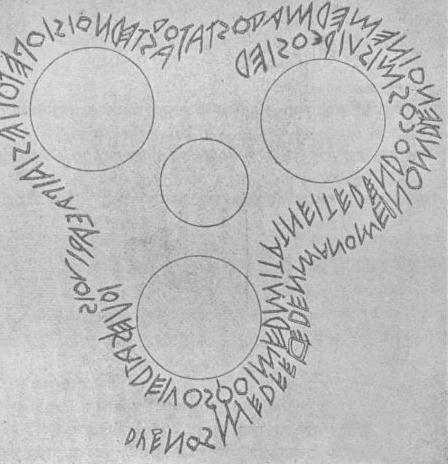
Duenos inscription

Sponsio is a formal, religiously guaranteed obligation. It can mean both betrothal as pledged by a woman's family, and a magistrate's solemn promise in international treaties on behalf of the Roman people.

The Latin word derives from a Proto-Indo-European root meaning a libation of wine offered to the gods, as does the Greek verb spendoo and the noun spondai, spondas, and Hittite spant-. In Greek it also acquired the meaning "compact, convention, treaty" (compare Latin foedus), as these were sanctioned with a libation to the gods on an altar. In Latin, sponsio becomes a legal contract between two parties, or sometimes a foedus between two nations.

In legal Latin the sponsio implied the existence of a person who acted as a sponsor, a guarantor for the obligation undertaken by somebody else. The verb is spondeo, sponsus. Related words are sponsalia, the ceremony of betrothal; sponsa, fiancée; and sponsus, both the second-declension noun meaning a husband-to-be and the fourth declension abstract meaning suretyship. The ceremonial character of sponsio suggests that Latin archaic forms of marriage were, like the confarreatio of Roman patricians, religiously sanctioned. Dumézil proposed that the oldest extant Latin document, the Duenos inscription, could be interpreted in light of sponsio.

==== superstitio ====
Superstitio was excessive devotion and enthusiasm in religious observance, in the sense of "doing or believing more than was necessary", or "irregular" religious practice that conflicted with Roman custom. "Religiosity" in its pejorative sense may be a better translation than "superstition", the English word derived from the Latin. Cicero defined superstitio as the "empty fear of the gods" (timor inanis deorum) in contrast to the properly pious cultivation of the gods that constituted lawful religio, a view that Seneca expressed as "religio honours the gods, superstitio wrongs them." Seneca wrote an entire treatise on superstitio, known to St. Augustine but no longer extant. Lucretius's famous condemnation of what is often translated as "Superstition" in his Epicurean didactic epic De rerum natura is actually directed at Religio.

Before the Christian era, superstitio was seen as a vice of individuals. Practices characterized as "magic" could be a form of superstitio as an excessive and dangerous quest for personal knowledge. By the early 2nd century AD, religions of other peoples that were perceived as resistant to religious assimilation began to be labeled by some Latin authors as superstitio, including druidism, Judaism, and Christianity. Under Christian hegemony, religio and superstitio were redefined as a dichotomy between Christianity, viewed as true religio, and the superstitiones or false religions of those who declined to convert.

==== supplicatio ====
Supplicationes are days of public prayer when the men, women, and children of Rome traveled in procession to religious sites around the city praying for divine aid in times of crisis. A suplicatio can also be a thanksgiving after the receipt of aid. Supplications might also be ordered in response to prodigies; again, the population as a whole wore wreaths, carried laurel twigs, and attended sacrifices at temple precincts throughout the city.

=== T ===
==== tabernaculum ====
See auguraculum. The origin of the English word "tabernacle."

==== templum ====
A templum was the sacred space defined by an augur for ritual purposes, most importantly the taking of the auspices, a place "cut off" as sacred: compare Greek temenos, from temnein to cut. It could be created as temporary or permanent, depending on the lawful purpose of the inauguration. Auspices and senate meetings were unlawful unless held in a templum; if the senate house (Curia) was unavailable, an augur could apply the appropriate religious formulae to provide a lawful alternative.

To create a templum, the augur aligned his zone of observation (auguraculum, a square, portable surround) with the cardinal points of heaven and earth. The altar and entrance were sited on the east-west axis: the sacrificer faced east. The precinct was thus "defined and freed" (effatum et liberatum). In most cases, signs to the augur's left (north) showed divine approval and signs to his right (south), disapproval. Temple buildings of stone followed this ground-plan and were sacred in perpetuity.

Rome itself was a kind of templum, with the pomerium as sacred boundary and the arx (citadel), and Quirinal and Palatine hills as reference points whenever a specially dedicated templum was created within. Augurs had authority to establish multiple templa beyond the pomerium, using the same augural principles.

=== V ===
==== verba certa ====
Verba certa (also found nearly as often with the word order certa verba) are the "exact words" of a legal or religious formula, that is, the words as "set once and for ever, immutable and unchangeable." Compare certae precationes, fixed prayers of invocation, and verba concepta, which in both Roman civil law and augural law described a verbal formula that could be "conceived" flexibly to suit the circumstances. With their emphasis on exact adherence, the archaic verba certa are a magico-religious form of prayer. In a ritual context, prayer (prex) was not a form of personal spontaneous expression, but a demonstration that the speaker knew the correct thing to say. Words were regarded as having power; in order to be efficacious, the formula had to be recited accurately, in full, and with the correct pronunciation. To reduce the risk of error (vitium), the magistrate or priest who spoke was prompted from the text by an assistant.

==== verba concepta ====
In both religious and legal usage, verba concepta ("preconceived words") were verbal formulas that could be adapted for particular circumstances. Compare verba certa, "fixed words." Collections of verba concepta would have been part of the augural archives. Varro preserves an example, albeit textually vexed, of a formula for founding a templum.

In the legal sense, concepta verba (the phrase is found with either word order) were the statements crafted by a presiding praetor for the particulars of a case. Earlier in the Roman legal system, the plaintiff had to state his claim within a narrowly defined set of fixed phrases (certa verba); in the Mid Republic, more flexible formulas allowed a more accurate description of the particulars of the issue under consideration. But the practice may have originated as a kind of "dodge," since a praetor was liable to religious penalties if he used certa verba for legal actions on days marked nefastus on the calendar.

St. Augustine removed the phrase verba concepta from its religious and legal context to describe the cognitive process of memory: "When a true narrative of the past is related, the memory produces not the actual events which have passed away but words conceived (verba concepta) from images of them, which they fixed in the mind like imprints as they passed through the senses." Augustine's conceptualizing of memory as verbal has been used to elucidate the Western tradition of poetry and its shared origins with sacred song and magical incantation (see also carmen), and is less a departure from Roman usage than a recognition of the original relation between formula and memory in a pre-literate world. Some scholars see the tradition of stylized, formulaic language as the verbal tradition from which Latin literature develops, with concepta verba appearing in poems such as Carmen 34 of Catullus.

==== ver sacrum ====
The sacred spring was a ritual migration.

==== victima ====
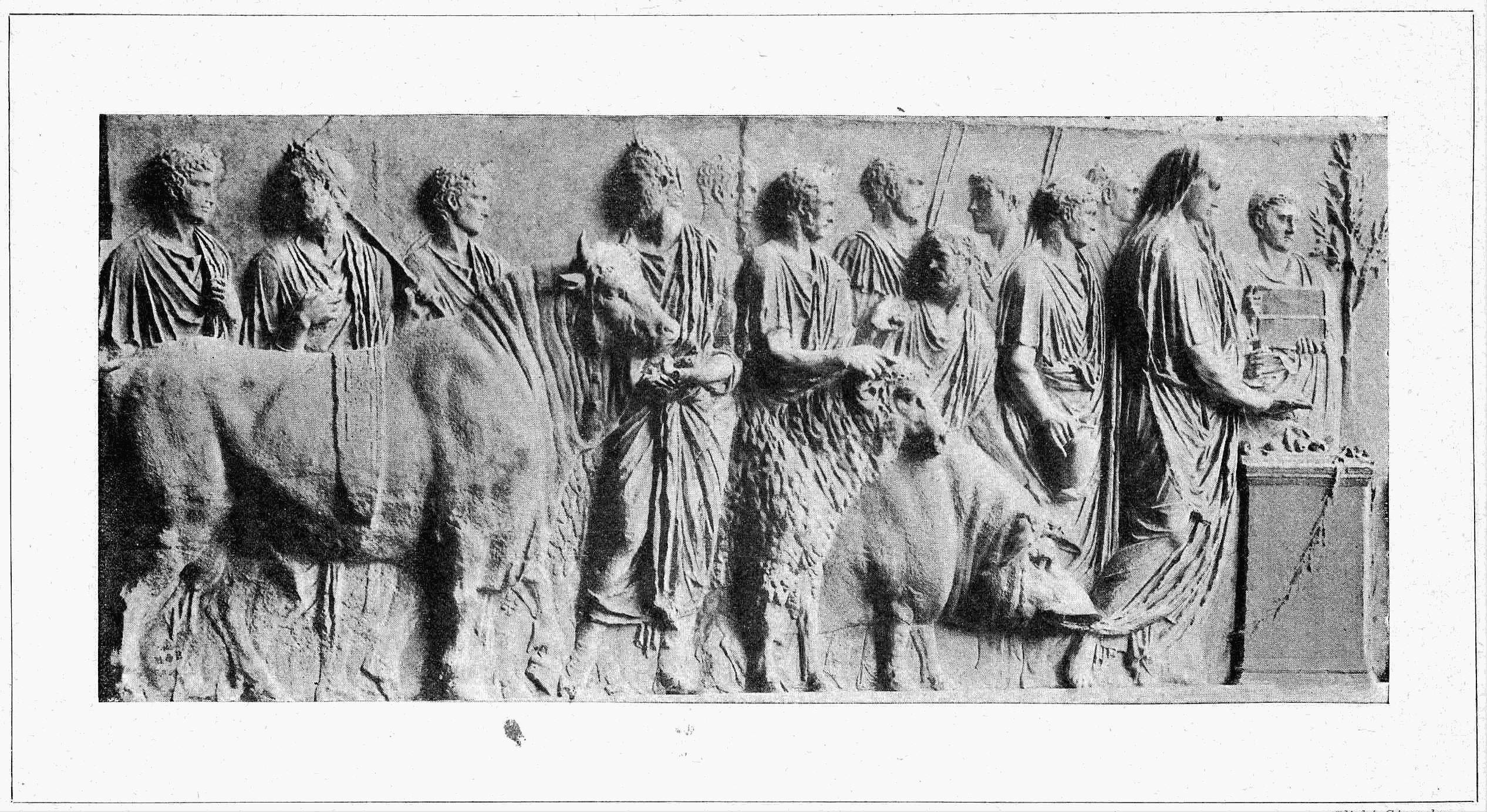
Victimae for a suovetaurilia led to the altar by victimarii

The victima was the animal offering in a sacrifice, or very rarely a human. The victim was subject to an examination (probatio victimae) by a lower-rank priest (pontifex minor) to determine whether it met the criteria for a particular offering. With some exceptions, male deities received castrated animals. Goddesses were usually offered female victims, though from around the 160s AD the goddess Cybele was given a bull, along with its blood and testicles, in the Taurobolium. Color was also a criterion: white for the upper deities, dark for chthonic, red for Vulcan and at the Robigalia. A sacred fiction of sacrifice was that the victim had to consent, usually by a nod of the head, perhaps induced by the victimarius holding the halter. Fear, panic and agitation in the animal were bad omens.

The word victima is used interchangeably with hostia by Ovid and others, but some ancient authors attempt to distinguish between the two. Servius says that the hostia is sacrificed before battle, the victima afterward, which accords with Ovid's etymology of "victim" as that which has been killed by the right hand of the "victor" (with hostia related to hostis, "enemy").

The difference between the victima and hostia is elsewhere said to be a matter of size, with the victima larger (maior). See also piaculum and votum.

==== victimarius ====
The victimarius was an attendant or assistant at a sacrifice who handled the animal. Using a rope, he led the pig, sheep, or bovine that was to serve as the victim to the altar. In depictions of sacrifice, a victimarius called the popa carries a mallet or axe with which to strike the victima. Multiple victimarii are sometimes in attendance; one may hold down the victim's head while the other lands the blow. The victimarius severed the animal's carotid with a ritual knife (culter), and according to depictions was offered a hand towel afterwards by another attendant. He is sometimes shown dressed in an apron (limus). Inscriptions show that most victimarii were freedmen, but literary sources in late antiquity say that the popa was a public slave.

==== vitium ====
A mistake made while performing a ritual, or a disruption of augural procedure, including disregarding the auspices, was a vitium ("defect, imperfection, impediment"). Vitia, plural, could taint the outcome of elections, the validity of laws, and the conducting of military operations. The augurs issued an opinion on a given vitium, but these were not necessarily binding. In 215 BC the newly elected plebeian consul M. Claudius Marcellus resigned when the augurs and the senate decided that a thunderclap expressed divine disapproval of his election. The original meaning of the semantic root in vitium may have been "hindrance", related to the verb vito, vitare, "to go out of the way"; the adjective form vitiosus can mean "hindering", that is, "vitiating, faulty."

==== vitulari ====
A verb meaning chanting or reciting a formula with a joyful intonation and rhythm. The related noun Vitulatio was an annual thanksgiving offering carried out by the pontiffs on 8 July, the day after the Nonae Caprotinae. These were commemorations of Roman victory in the wake of the Gallic invasion. Macrobius says vitulari is the equivalent of Greek paianizein (παιανίζειν), "to sing a paean", a song expressing triumph or thanksgiving.

==== votum ====
In a religious context, votum, plural vota, is a vow or promise made to a deity. The word comes from the past participle of voveo, vovere; as the result of the verbal action "vow, promise", it may refer also to the fulfillment of this vow, that is, the thing promised. The votum is thus an aspect of the contractual nature of Roman religion, a bargaining expressed by do ut des, "I give that you might give."

== See also ==
- Religion in ancient Rome
- Imperial cult (ancient Rome)
- Roman festivals, on religious holidays
- Roman polytheistic reconstructionism
