= Jupiter (god) =

Chief deity of Roman state religion

- King of the gods; God of the sky and diurnal thunder
- Member of the Archaic Triad, Capitoline Triad and the Dii Consentes
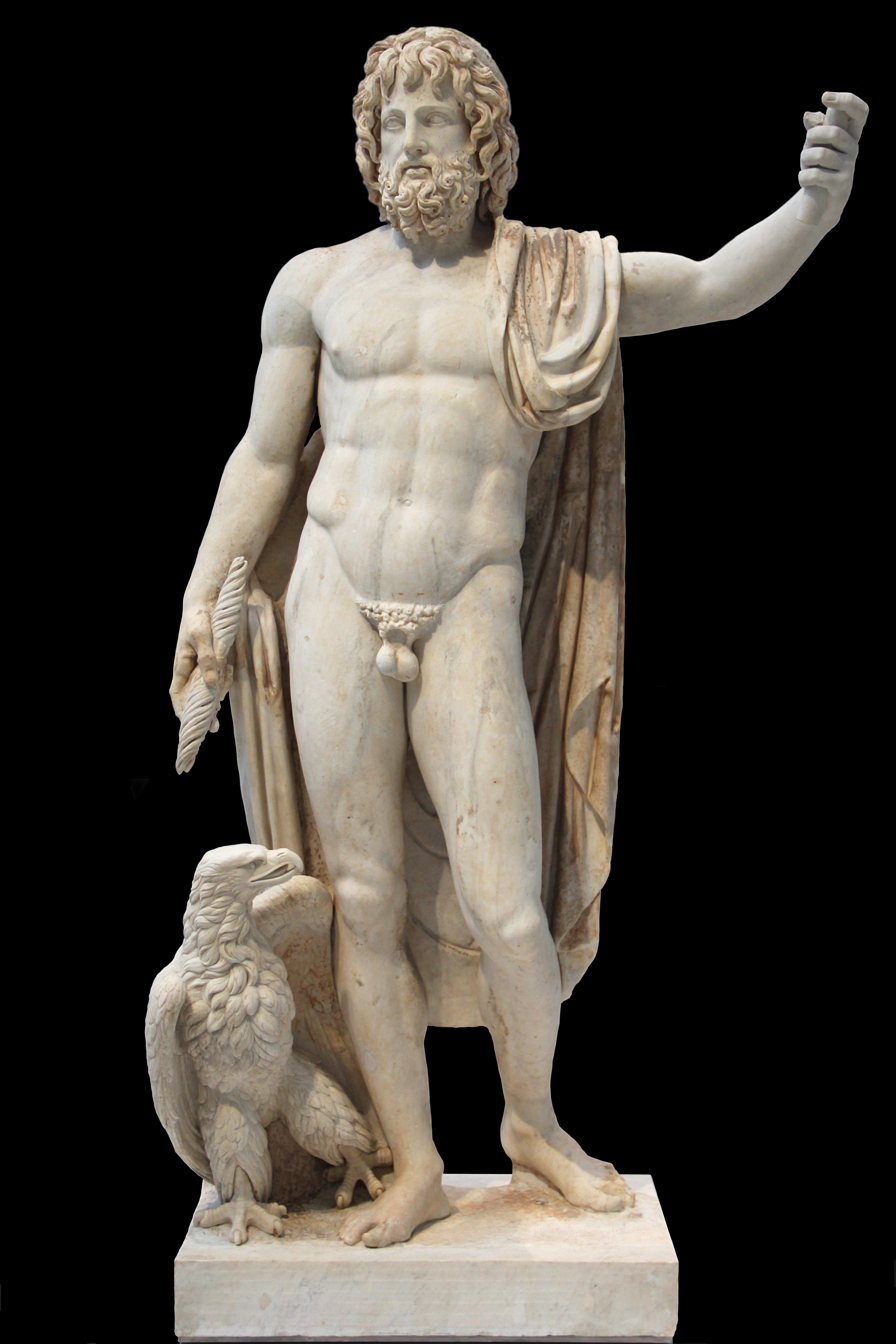
- A marble statue of Jupiter, Louvre
- Other names: Jove
- Venerated in: Imperial cult of ancient Rome; Polytheistic religion
- Abode: The heavens
- Planet: Jupiter
- Symbol: Lightning bolt, eagle, oak tree
- Day: Thursday (dies Jovis)

Genealogy
- Parents: Saturn and Ops
- Siblings: Vesta, Ceres, Juno, Pluto, Neptune
- Consort: Juno
- Children: Mars, Vulcan, Bellona, Angelos, Lucina, Juventas, Minerva, Hercules

Equivalents
- Etruscan: Tinia
- Greek: Zeus
- Hindu: Dyaus Pita
- Indo-European: *Dyḗus-ph₂tḗr

In ancient Roman religion and mythology, Jupiter (Latin: Iūpiter or Iuppiter, from Proto-Italic *djous "day, sky" + *patēr "father", thus "sky father"; Ancient Greek: Δίας or Ζεύς), also known as Jove (nom. and gen. Iovis [ˈjɔwɪs]), is the god of the sky and thunder, and king of the gods. Jupiter was the chief deity of Roman state religion throughout the Republican and Imperial eras, until Christianity became the dominant religion of the Empire. In Roman mythology, he negotiates with Numa Pompilius, the second king of Rome, to establish principles of Roman religion such as offering, or sacrifice.

Jupiter is thought to have originated as a sky god. His identifying implement is the thunderbolt and his primary sacred animal is the eagle, which held precedence over other birds in the taking of auspices and became one of the most common symbols of the Roman army (see Aquila). The two emblems were often combined to represent the god in the form of an eagle holding in its claws a thunderbolt, frequently seen on Greek and Roman coins. As the sky god, he was a divine witness to oaths, the sacred trust on which justice and good government depend. Many of his functions were focused on the Capitoline Hill, where the citadel was located. In the Capitoline Triad, he was the central guardian of the state with Juno and Minerva. His sacred tree was the oak.

The Romans regarded Jupiter as the equivalent of the Greek Zeus, and in Latin literature and Roman art, the myths and iconography of Zeus are adapted under the name Jupiter. In the Greek-influenced tradition, Jupiter was the brother of Neptune and Pluto, the Roman equivalents of Poseidon and Hades respectively. Each presided over one of the three realms of the universe: sky, the waters, and the underworld. The Italic Diespiter was also a sky god who manifested himself in the daylight, usually identified with Jupiter. Tinia is usually regarded as his Etruscan counterpart.

== Role in the state ==
The Romans believed that Jupiter granted them supremacy because they had honoured him more than any other people had. Jupiter was "the fount of the auspices upon which the relationship of the city with the gods rested." He personified the divine authority of Rome's highest offices, internal organization, and external relations. His image in the Republican and Imperial Capitol bore regalia associated with Rome's ancient kings and the highest consular and Imperial honours.

The consuls swore their oath of office in Jupiter's name, and honoured him on the annual feriae of the Capitol in September. To thank him for his help, and to secure his continued support, they sacrificed a white ox (bos mas) with gilded horns. A similar sacrificial offering was made by triumphal generals, who surrendered the tokens of their victory at the feet of Jupiter's statue in the Capitol. Some scholars have viewed the triumphator as embodying (or impersonating) Jupiter in the triumphal procession.

Jupiter's association with kingship and sovereignty was reinterpreted as Rome's form of government changed. Originally, Rome was ruled by kings; after the monarchy was abolished and the Republic established, religious prerogatives were transferred to the patres, the patrician ruling class. Nostalgia for the kingship (affectatio regni) was considered treasonous. Those suspected of harbouring monarchical ambitions were punished, regardless of their service to the state. In the 5th century BC, the triumphator Camillus was sent into exile after he drove a chariot with a team of four white horses (quadriga)—an honour reserved for Jupiter himself. When Marcus Manlius, whose defense of the Capitol against the invading Gauls had earned him the name Capitolinus, was accused of regal pretensions, he was executed as a traitor by being cast from the Tarpeian Rock. His house on the Capitoline Hill was razed, and it was decreed that no patrician should ever be allowed to live there. Capitoline Jupiter represented a continuity of royal power from the Regal period, and conferred power to the magistrates who paid their respects to him.

During the Conflict of the Orders, Rome's plebeians demanded the right to hold political and religious office. During their first secessio (similar to a general strike), they withdrew from the city and threatened to found their own. When they agreed to come back to Rome they dedicated the hill where they had retreated to Jupiter as symbol and guarantor of the unity of the Roman res publica. Plebeians eventually became eligible for all the magistracies and most priesthoods, but the high priest of Jupiter (Flamen Dialis) remained the preserve of patricians.

=== Flamen and Flaminica Dialis ===
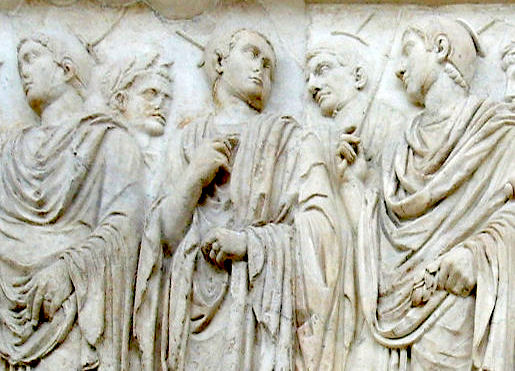
Detail of relief from the Augustan Altar of Peace, showing flamines wearing the pointed apex

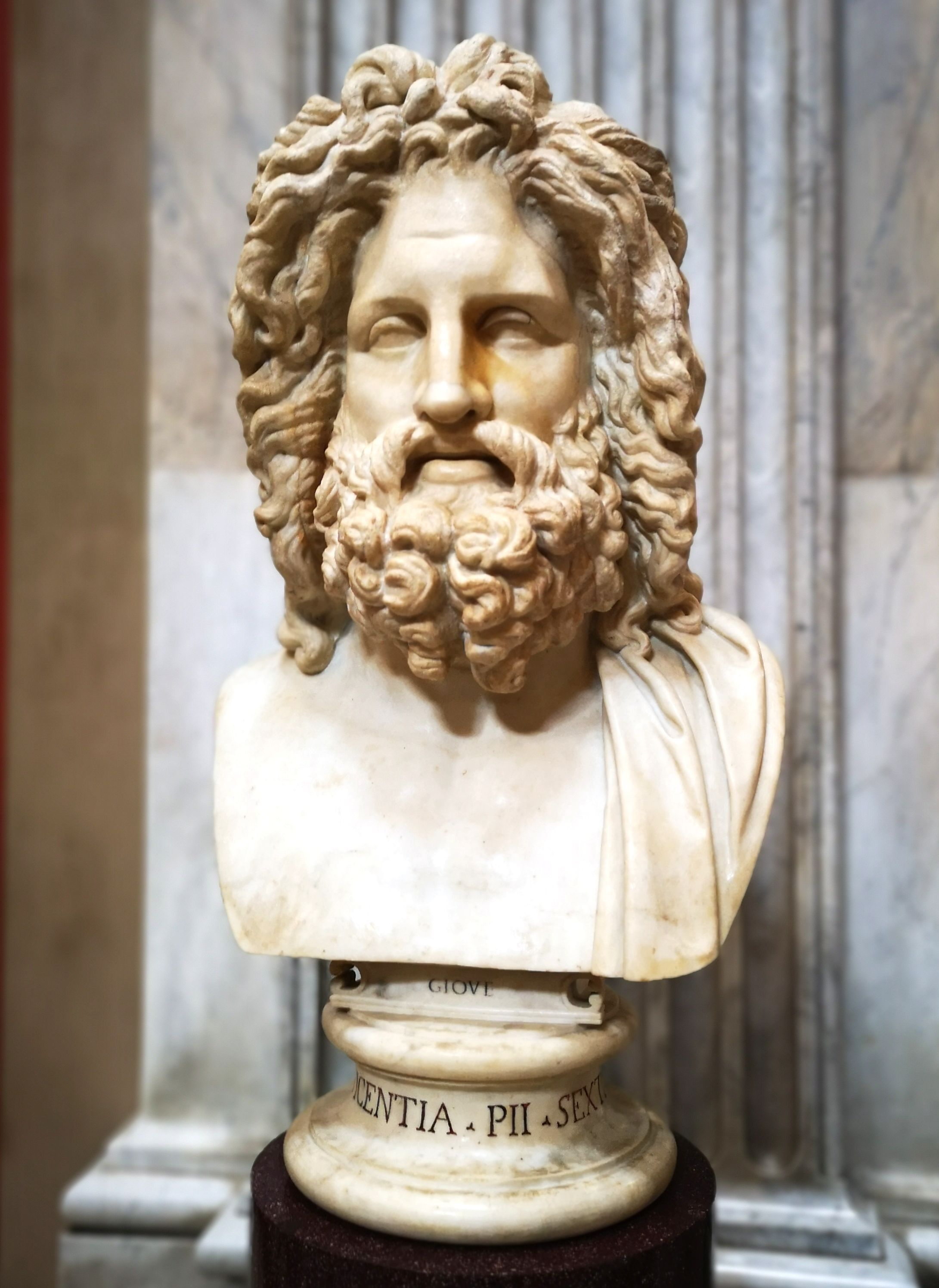
Bust of Jupiter or Zeus of Otricoli, Vatican Museums, Rome.

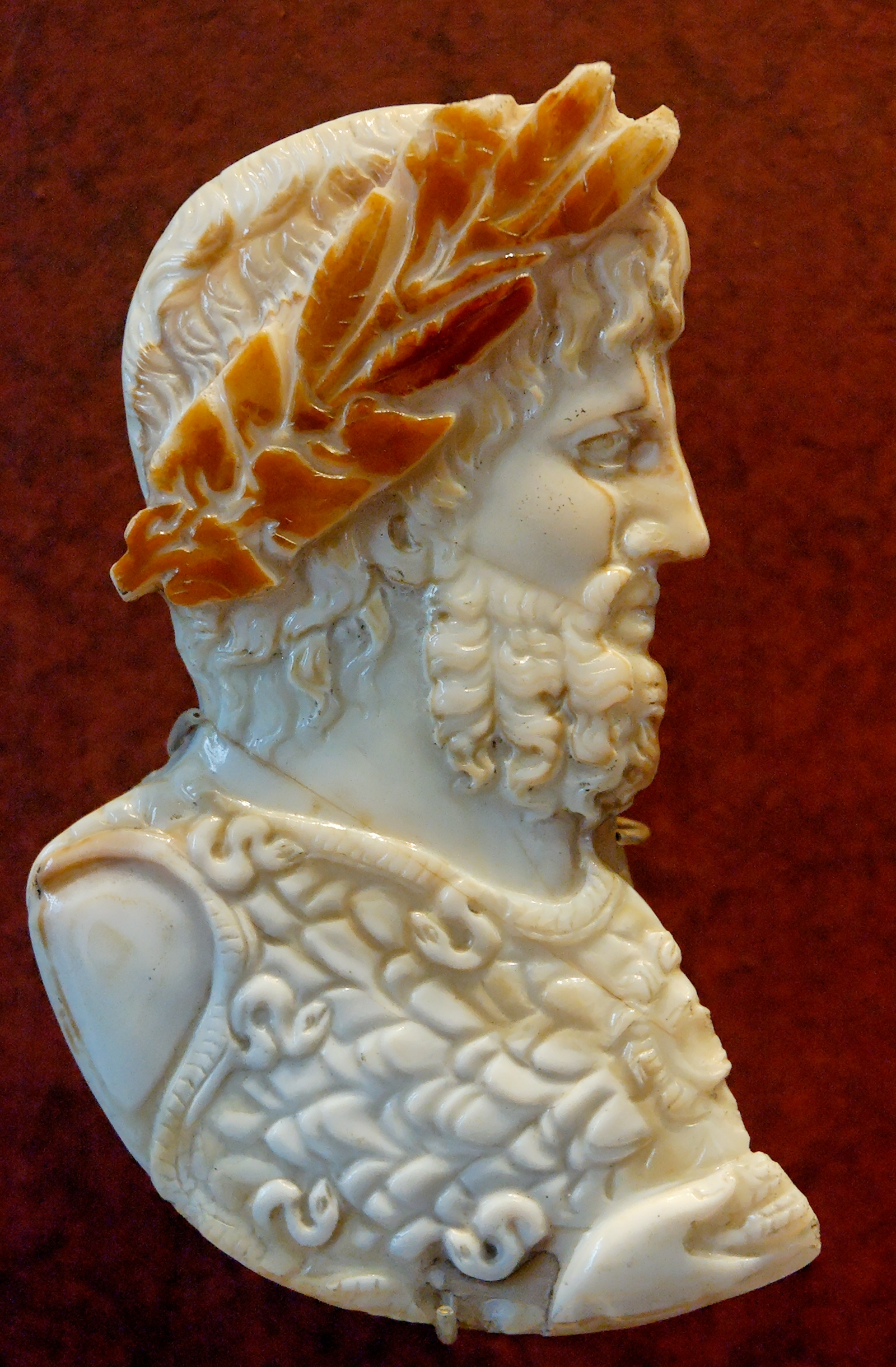
Jupiter's head crowned with laurel and ivy. Sardonyx cameo (Louvre)

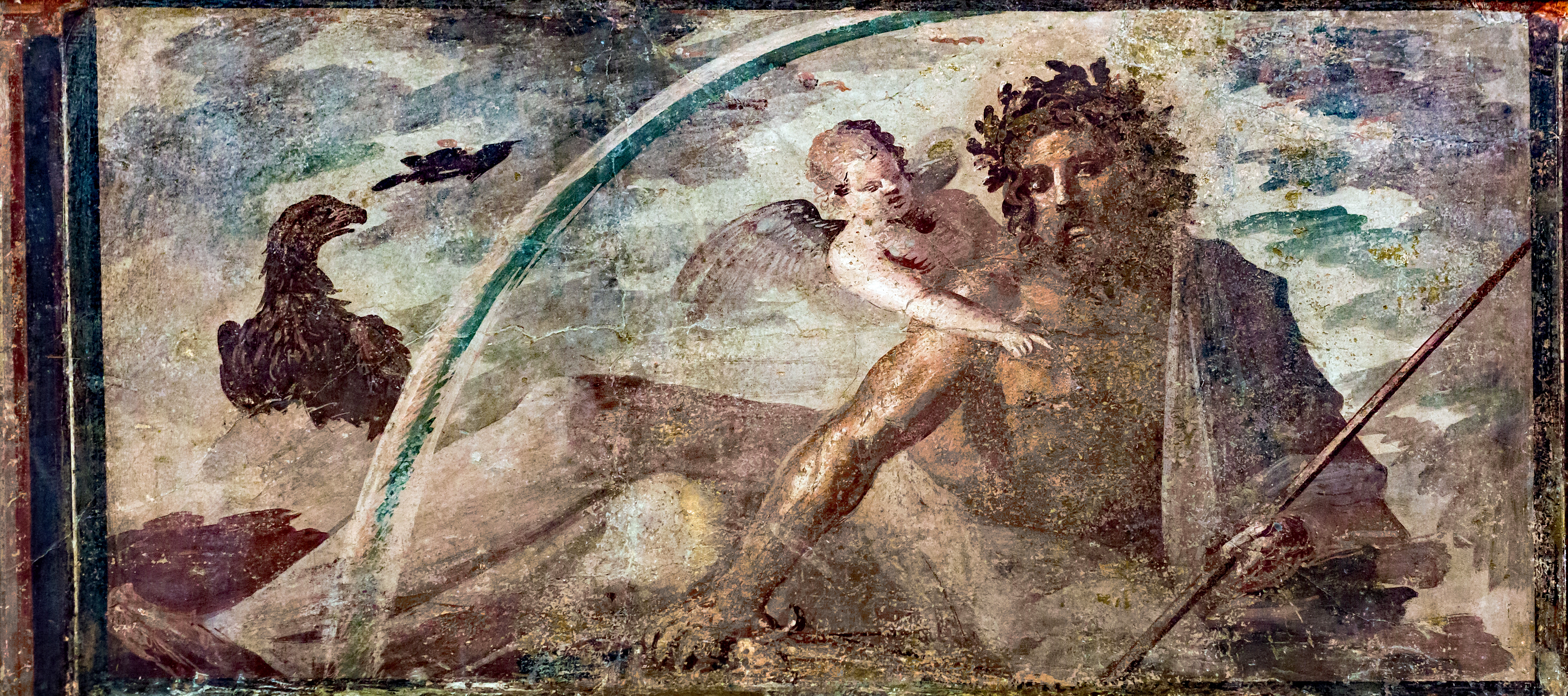
Jupiter-Zeus with thunderbolt and sceptre in the clouds. Fresco in Herculaneum, 1–37 AD

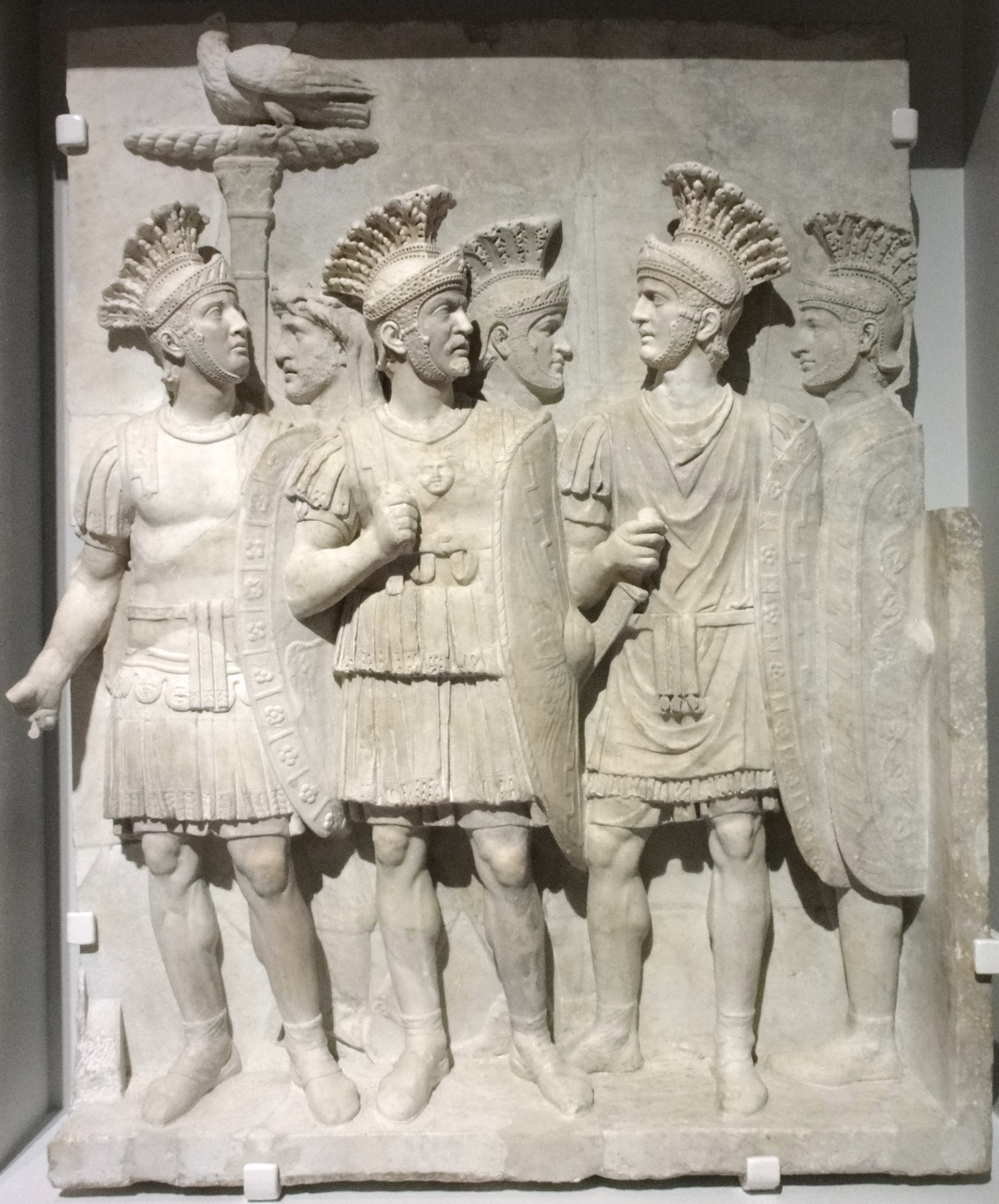
Decor Fragment of a triumphal arch: The Emperor's Guards, The Praetorian Guard, featured in a relief with an eagle grasping a thunderbolt through its claws; in reference to Roman equivalent form of Jupiter.

Jupiter was served by the patrician Flamen Dialis, the highest-ranking member of the flamines, a college of fifteen priests in the official public cult of Rome, each of whom was devoted to a particular deity. His wife, the Flaminica Dialis, had her own duties, and presided over the sacrifice of a ram to Jupiter on each of the nundinae, the "market" days of a calendar cycle, comparable to a week. The couple were required to marry by the exclusive patrician ritual confarreatio, which included a sacrifice of spelt bread to Jupiter Farreus (from far, "wheat, grain").

The office of Flamen Dialis was circumscribed by several unique ritual prohibitions, some of which shed light on the sovereign nature of the god himself. For instance, the flamen may remove his clothes or apex (his pointed hat) only when under a roof, in order to avoid showing himself naked to the sky—that is, "as if under the eyes of Jupiter" as god of the heavens. Every time the Flaminica saw a lightning bolt or heard a clap of thunder (Jupiter's distinctive instrument), she was prohibited from carrying on with her normal routine until she placated the god.

Some privileges of the flamen of Jupiter may reflect the regal nature of Jupiter: he had the use of the curule chair, and was the only priest (sacerdos) who was preceded by a lictor and had a seat in the Roman Senate. Other regulations concern his ritual purity and his separation from the military function; he was forbidden to ride a horse or see the army outside the sacred boundary of Rome (pomerium). Although he served the god who embodied the sanctity of the oath, it was not religiously permissible (fas) for the Dialis to swear an oath. He could not have contacts with anything dead or connected with death: corpses, funerals, funeral fires, raw meat. This set of restrictions reflects the fulness of life and absolute freedom that are features of Jupiter.

=== Augurs ===
The augures publici, augurs were a college of sacerdotes who were in charge of all inaugurations and of the performing of ceremonies known as auguria. Their creation was traditionally ascribed to Romulus. They were considered the only official interpreters of Jupiter's will, thence they were essential to the very existence of the Roman State as Romans saw in Jupiter the only source of state authority.

=== Fetials ===
The fetials were a college of 20 men devoted to the religious administration of international affairs of state. Their task was to preserve and apply the fetial law (ius fetiale), a complex set of procedures aimed at ensuring the protection of the gods in Rome's relations with foreign states. Iuppiter Lapis is the god under whose protection they act, and whom the chief fetial (pater patratus) invokes in the rite concluding a treaty. If a declaration of war ensues, the fetial calls upon Jupiter and Quirinus, the heavenly, earthly and chthonic gods as witnesses of any potential violation of the ius. He can then declare war within 33 days.

The action of the fetials falls under Jupiter's jurisdiction as the divine defender of good faith. Several emblems of the fetial office pertain to Jupiter. The silex was the stone used for the fetial sacrifice, housed in the Temple of Iuppiter Feretrius, as was their sceptre. Sacred herbs (sagmina), sometimes identified as vervain, had to be taken from the nearby citadel (arx) for their ritual use.

=== Jupiter and religion in the secessions of the plebs ===
The role of Jupiter in the conflict of the orders is a reflection of the religiosity of the Romans. On one side, the patricians were able to naturally claim the support of the supreme god as they held the auspices of the State. On the other side, the plebeians argued that, as Jupiter was the source of justice, they had his favor because their cause was just.

The first secession was caused by the excessive debt burden on the plebs. The legal institute of the nexum permitted a debtor to become a slave of his creditor. The plebs argued the debts had become unsustainable because of the expenses of the wars wanted by the patricians. As the senate did not accede to the proposal of a total debt remission advanced by dictator and augur Manius Valerius Maximus the plebs retired on the Mons Sacer, a hill located three Roman miles to the North-northeast of Rome, past the Nomentan bridge on river Anio. The place is windy and was usually the site of rites of divination performed by haruspices. The senate in the end sent a ten-member delegation, among whom were Menenius Agrippa and Manius Valerius, with full powers to make a deal with the plebeians. According to the inscription written on the order of Augustus, found at Arezzo in 1688, as well as other literary sources, it was Valerius who brought the plebs down from the mount, after the secessionists had consecrated it to Jupiter Territor and built an altar (ara) on its summit (presumably, the consecration only pertained to the summit). The fear of the wrath of Jupiter was an important element in the solution of the crisis. The ritual required the participation of both an augur (presumably Manius Valerius himself) and a pontifex.

The second secession was caused by the autocratic and arrogant behaviour of the decemviri, who had been charged by the Roman people with recording all the laws then in use, which until then were kept secret by the patrician magistrates and the sacerdotes. In advance, all plebeian magistrates and the tribunes of the plebs had resigned in protest. The task resulted in the Twelve Tables, although those only concerned private law. The plebs once again retreated to Mons Sacer: This act, besides recalling the first secession, was meant to seek the protection of the supreme god, Iupiter (Jupiter). The secession ended with the resignation of the decemviri and an amnesty for those soldiers who had abandoned their commanders and deserted from their camp near Mons Algidus, while at war against the Volscians. The amnesty was granted by the senate and guaranteed by the pontifex maximus Quintus Furius (in Livy's version – alternately, possibly Marcus Papirius) who also supervised the nomination of the new tribunes, then gathered on the Aventine Hill. The role played by the pontifex maximus in a situation of vacation of powers is a significant element underlining the religious basis and character of the tribunicia potestas.

== Myths and legends ==
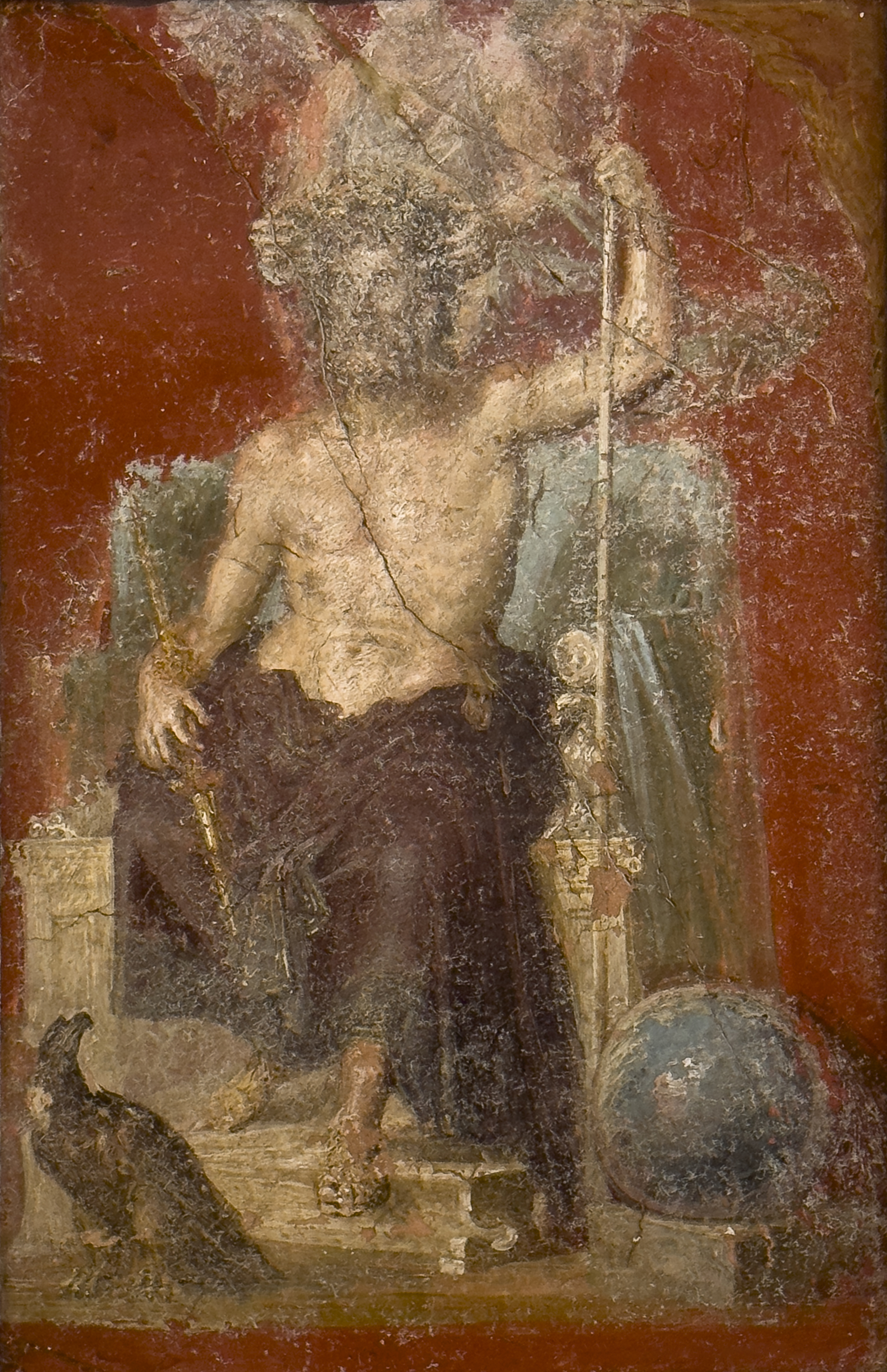
Fresco of enthroned Zeus/Jupiter, Pompeii, House of the Dioscuri, 62-79 CE.

A dominant line of scholarship has held that Rome lacked a body of myths in its earliest period, or that this original mythology has been irrecoverably obscured by the influence of the Greek narrative tradition. After the influence of Greek culture on Roman culture, Latin literature and iconography reinterpreted the myths of Zeus in depictions and narratives of Jupiter. In the legendary history of Rome, Jupiter is often connected to kings and kingship.

=== Birth ===
Jupiter is depicted as the twin of Juno in a statue at Praeneste that showed them nursed by Fortuna Primigenia. An inscription that is also from Praeneste, however, says that Fortuna Primigenia was Jupiter's first-born child. Jacqueline Champeaux sees this contradiction as the result of successive different cultural and religious phases, in which a wave of influence coming from the Hellenic world made Fortuna the daughter of Jupiter. The childhood of Zeus is an important theme in Greek religion, art and literature, but there are only rare (or dubious) depictions of Jupiter as a child.

=== Numa Pompilius ===
Faced by a period of bad weather endangering the harvest during one early spring, King Numa resorted to the scheme of asking the advice of the god by evoking his presence. He succeeded through the help of Picus and Faunus, whom he had imprisoned by making them drunk. The two gods (with a charm) evoked Jupiter, who was forced to come down to earth at the Aventine (hence named Iuppiter Elicius, according to Ovid). After Numa skilfully avoided the requests of the god for human sacrifices, Jupiter agreed to his request to know how lightning bolts are averted, asking only for the substitutions Numa had mentioned: an onion bulb, hairs and a fish. Moreover, Jupiter promised that at the sunrise of the following day he would give to Numa and the Roman people pawns of the imperium. The following day, after throwing three lightning bolts across a clear sky, Jupiter sent down from heaven a shield. Since this shield had no angles, Numa named it ancile; because in it resided the fate of the imperium, he had many copies made of it to disguise the real one. He asked the smith Mamurius Veturius to make the copies, and gave them to the Salii. As his only reward, Mamurius expressed the wish that his name be sung in the last of their carmina. Plutarch gives a slightly different version of the story, writing that the cause of the miraculous drop of the shield was a plague and not linking it with the Roman imperium.

=== Tullus Hostilius ===
Throughout his reign, King Tullus had a scornful attitude towards religion. His temperament was warlike, and he disregarded religious rites and piety. After conquering the Albans with the duel between the Horatii and Curiatii, Tullus destroyed Alba Longa and deported its inhabitants to Rome. As Livy tells the story, omens (prodigia) in the form of a rain of stones occurred on the Alban Mount because the deported Albans had disregarded their ancestral rites linked to the sanctuary of Jupiter. In addition to the omens, a voice was heard requesting that the Albans perform the rites. A plague followed and at last the king himself fell ill. As a consequence, the warlike character of Tullus broke down; he resorted to religion and petty, superstitious practices. At last, he found a book by Numa recording a secret rite on how to evoke Iuppiter Elicius. The king attempted to perform it, but since he executed the rite improperly the god threw a lightning bolt which burned down the king's house and killed Tullus.

=== Tarquin the Elder ===
When approaching Rome (where Tarquin was heading to try his luck in politics after unsuccessful attempts in his native Tarquinii), an eagle swooped down, removed his hat, flew screaming in circles, replaced the hat on his head and flew away. Tarquin's wife Tanaquil interpreted this as a sign that he would become king based on the bird, the quadrant of the sky from which it came, the god who had sent it and the fact it touched his hat (an item of clothing placed on a man's most noble part, the head).

The Elder Tarquin is credited with introducing the Capitoline Triad to Rome, by building the so-called Capitolium Vetus. Macrobius writes this issued from his Samothracian mystery beliefs.

== Cult ==
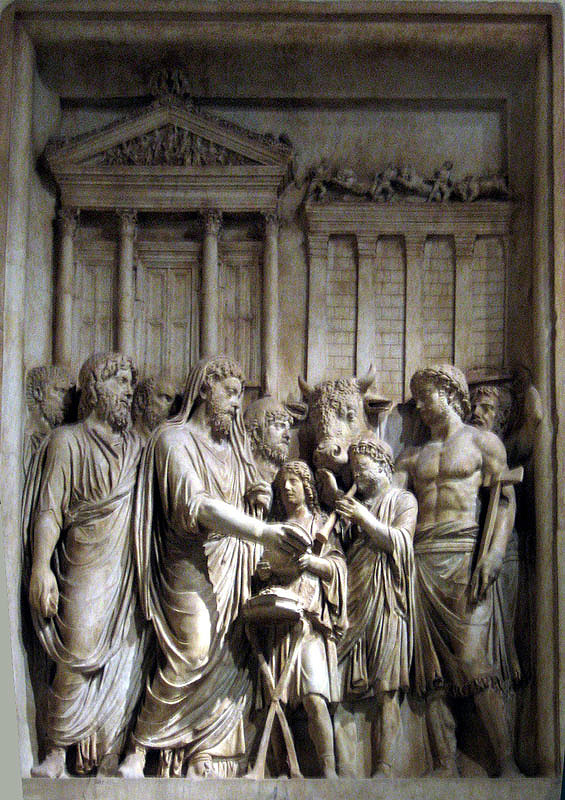
Emperor Marcus Aurelius, attended by his family, offers sacrifice outside the Temple of Jupiter Capitolinus after his victories in Germany (late 2nd century AD). Capitoline Museum, Rome

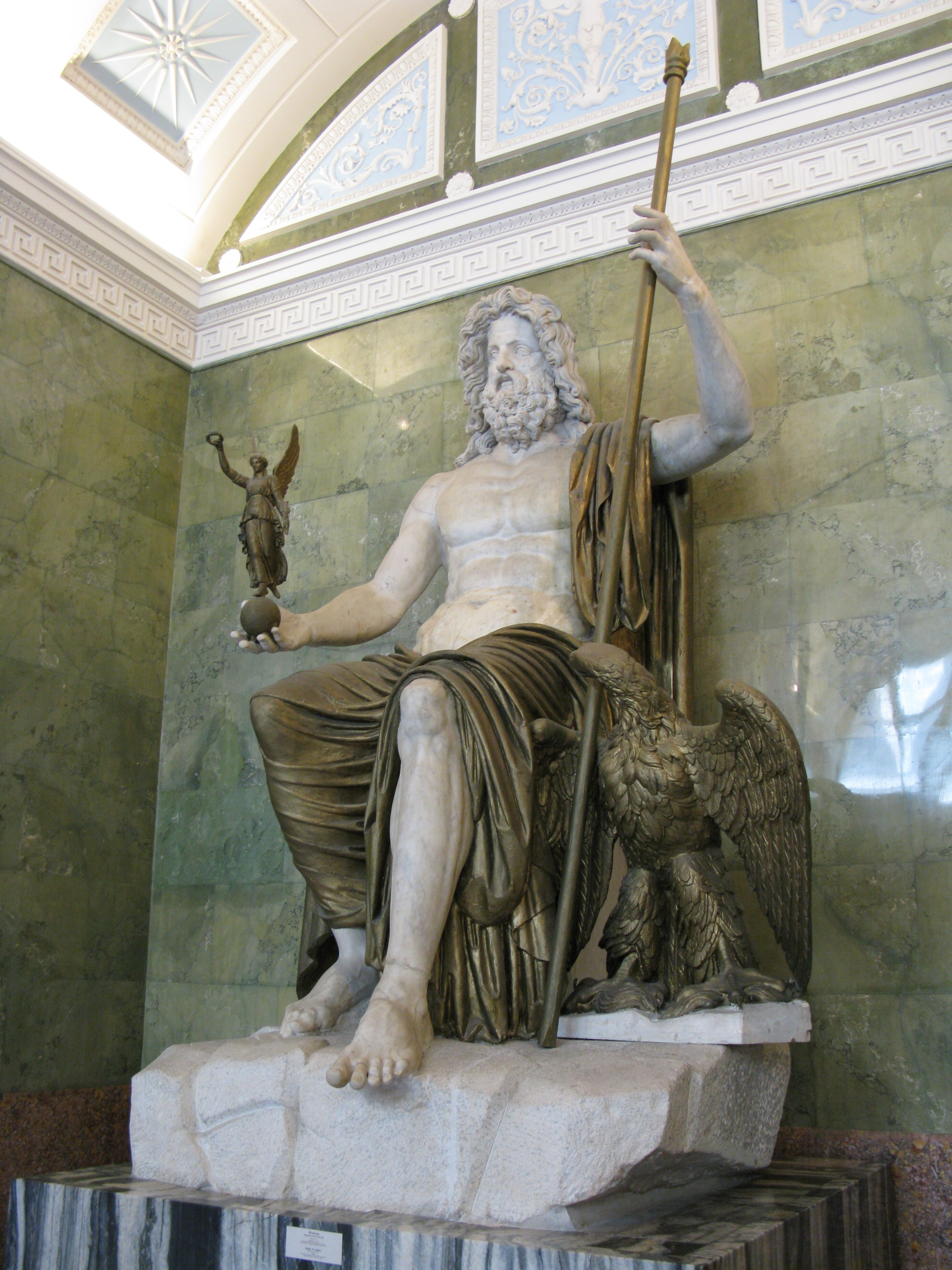
Colossal statue of Jupiter in the Hermitage Museum

=== Sacrifices ===
Sacrificial victims (hostiae) offered to Jupiter were the ox (castrated bull), the lamb (on the Ides, the ovis idulis) and the wether (a castrated goat or castrated ram) (on the Ides of January). The animals were required to be white. The question of the lamb's sex is unresolved; while a sacrificial lamb for a male deity was usually male, for the vintage-opening festival the flamen Dialis sacrificed a ewe lamb to Jupiter. This rule seems to have had many exceptions, as the sacrifice of a ram on the Nundinae by the flaminica Dialis demonstrates. During one of the crises of the Punic Wars, Jupiter was offered every animal born that year.

=== Temples ===
==== Temple of Capitoline Jupiter ====
The Temple of Jupiter Optimus Maximus stood on the Capitoline Hill in Rome. Jupiter was worshiped there as an individual deity, and with Juno and Minerva as part of the Capitoline Triad. The building was supposedly begun by king Tarquinius Priscus, completed by the last king (Tarquinius Superbus) and inaugurated in the early days of the Roman Republic (13 September 509 BC). It was topped with the statues of four horses drawing a quadriga, with Jupiter as charioteer. A large statue of Jupiter stood within; on festival days, its face was painted red. In (or near) this temple was the Iuppiter Lapis: the Jupiter Stone, on which oaths could be sworn.

Jupiter's Capitoline Temple probably served as the architectural model for his provincial temples. When Hadrian built Aelia Capitolina on the site of Jerusalem, a temple to Jupiter Capitolinus was erected in the place of the destroyed Temple in Jerusalem.

==== Other temples in Rome ====
There were two temples in Rome dedicated to Iuppiter Stator; the first one was built and dedicated in 294 BC by Marcus Atilius Regulus after the third Samnite War. It was located on the Via Nova, below the Porta Mugonia, ancient entrance to the Palatine. Legend attributed its founding to Romulus. There may have been an earlier shrine (fanum), since the Jupiter cult is attested epigraphically. Ovid places the temple's dedication on 27 June, but it is unclear whether this was the original date, or the rededication after the restoration by Augustus. (Note: Based on the tradition of dedicating Jovian temples on the Ides. This assumption is supported by the calendar of Philocalus, which states on the Ides of January (13): Iovi Statori c(ircenses) m(issus) XXIV.)

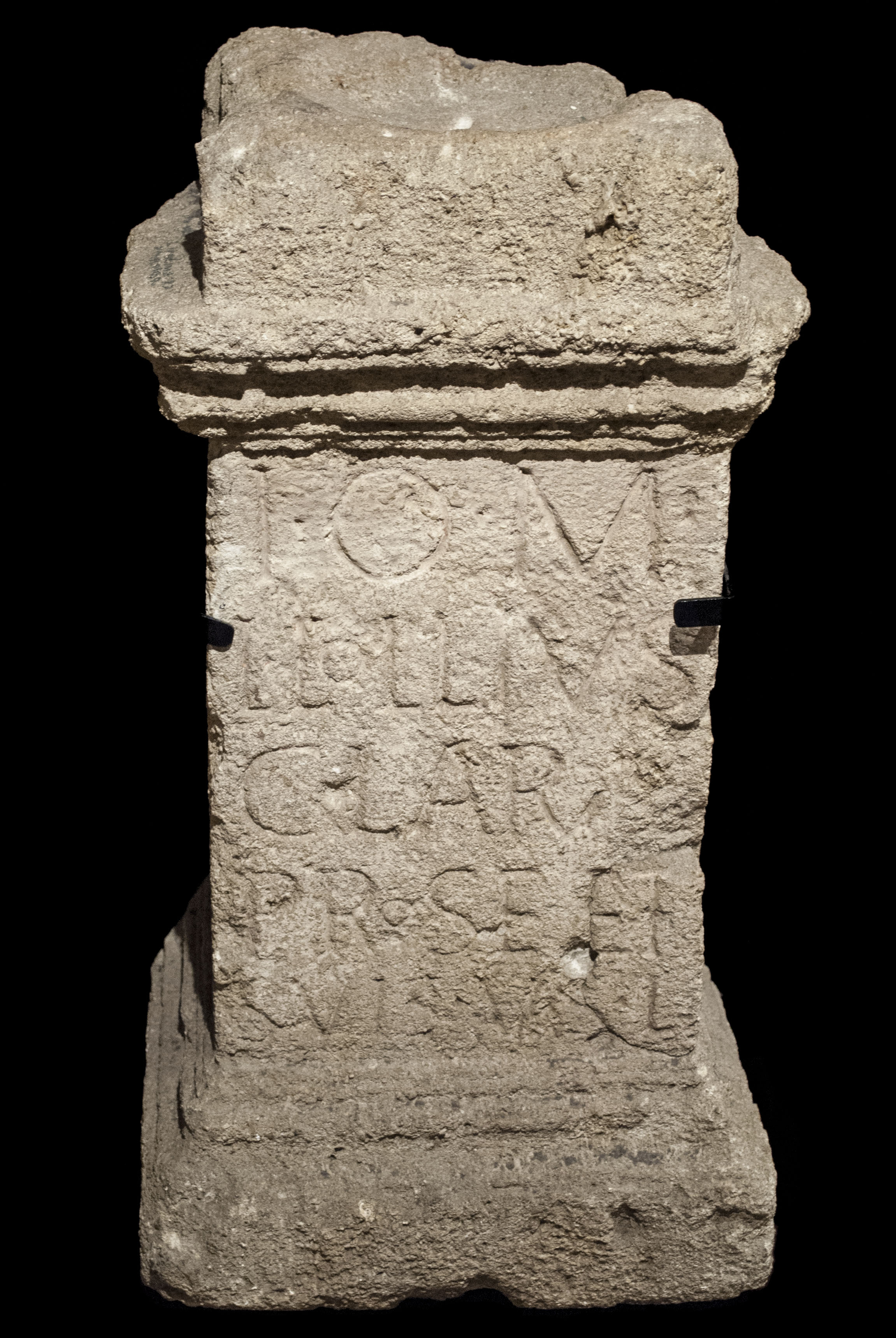
Altar to Jupiter on the outskirts of legionary fortress, 2nd–3rd century AD. Inscription: "Dedicated by L. Lollius Clarus for himself and his family"

A second temple of Iuppiter Stator was built and dedicated by Quintus Caecilus Metellus Macedonicus after his triumph in 146 BC near the Circus Flaminius. It was connected to the restored temple of Iuno Regina with a portico (porticus Metelli). Augustus constructed the Temple of Jupiter Tonans near that of Jupiter Capitolinus between 26 and 22 BC.

Iuppiter Victor had a temple dedicated by Quintus Fabius Maximus Gurges during the third Samnite War in 295 BC. It was probably on the Quirinal, on which an inscription reading Diovei Victore has been found, but was eclipsed by the imperial period by the Temple of Jupiter Invictus on the Palatine, which was often referred to by the same name. Inscriptions from the imperial age have revealed the existence of an otherwise-unknown temple of Iuppiter Propugnator on the Palatine.

=== Iuppiter Latiaris and Feriae Latinae ===
The cult of Iuppiter Latiaris was the most ancient known cult of the god: it was practised since very remote times near the top of the Mons Albanus on which the god was venerated as the high protector of the Latin League under the hegemony of Alba Longa.

After the destruction of Alba by king Tullus Hostilius the cult was forsaken. The god manifested his discontent through the prodigy of a rain of stones: the commission sent by the Roman senate to inquire was also greeted by a rain of stones and heard a loud voice from the grove on the summit of the mount requesting the Albans perform the religious service to the god according to the rites of their country. In consequence of this event the Romans instituted a festival of nine days (nundinae). Nonetheless a plague ensued: in the end Tullus Hostilius himself was affected and lastly killed by the god with a lightning bolt. The festival was reestablished on its primitive site by the last Roman king Tarquin the Proud under the leadership of Rome.

The feriae Latinae, or Latiar as they were known originally, were the common festival (panegyris) of the so-called Priscan Latins and of the Albans. Their restoration aimed at grounding Roman hegemony in this ancestral religious tradition of the Latins. The original cult was reinstated unchanged as is testified by some archaic features of the ritual: the exclusion of wine from the sacrifice, the offers of milk and cheese, and the ritual use of rocking among the games. Rocking is one of the most ancient rites mimicking ascent to Heaven and is very widespread. At the Latiar the rocking took place on a tree and the winner was of course the one who had swung the highest. This rite was said to have been instituted by the Albans to commemorate the disappearance of king Latinus, in the battle against Mezentius king of Caere: the rite symbolised a search for him both on earth and in heaven. The rocking as well as the customary drinking of milk was also considered to commemorate and ritually reinstate infancy. The Romans in the last form of the rite brought the sacrificial ox from Rome and every participant was bestowed a portion of the meat, a rite known as carnem petere. Other games were held in every participant borough. In Rome a race of chariots (quadrigae) was held starting from the Capitol: the winner drank a liquor made with absynth. This competition has been compared to the Vedic rite of the vajapeya: in it seventeen chariots run a phoney race which must be won by the king in order to allow him to drink a cup of madhu, i. e. soma. The feasting lasted for at least four days, possibly six according to Niebuhr, one day for each of the six Latin and Alban decuriae. According to different records 47 or 53 boroughs took part in the festival (the listed names too differ in Pliny Naturalis historia III 69 and Dionysius of Halicarnassus AR V 61). The Latiar became an important feature of Roman political life as they were feriae conceptivae, i. e. their date varied each year: the consuls and the highest magistrates were required to attend shortly after the beginning of the administration, originally on the Ides of March: the Feriae usually took place in early April. They could not start campaigning before its end and if any part of the games had been neglected or performed unritually the Latiar had to be wholly repeated. The inscriptions from the imperial age record the festival back to the time of the decemvirs. Wissowa remarks the inner linkage of the temple of the Mons Albanus with that of the Capitol apparent in the common association with the rite of the triumph: since 231 BC some triumphing commanders had triumphed there first with the same legal features as in Rome.

== Religious calendar ==
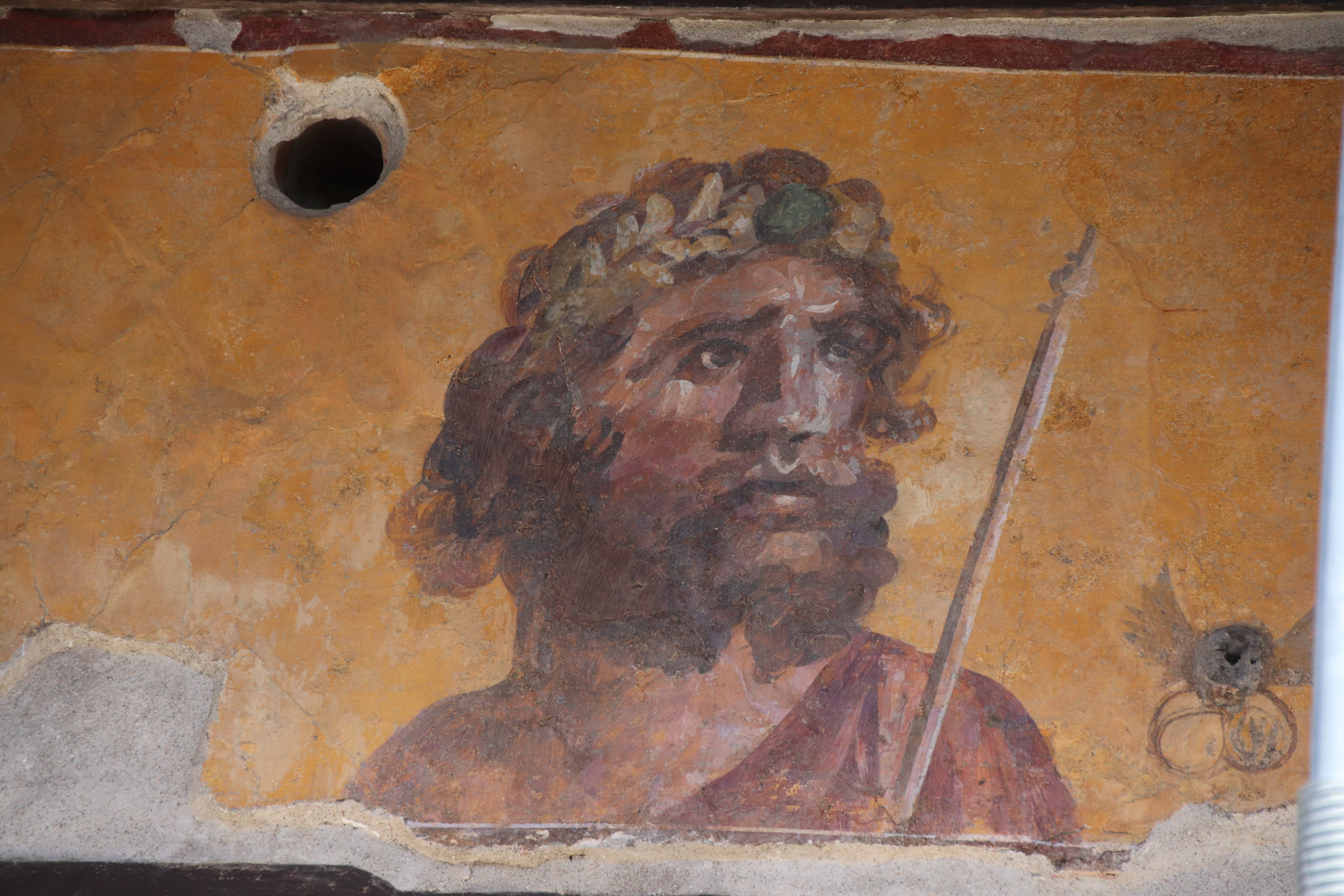
Antique fresco of Jupiter in Pompeii

=== Ides ===
The Ides (the midpoint of the month, with a full moon) was sacred to Jupiter, because on that day heavenly light shone day and night. Some (or all) Ides were Feriae Iovis, sacred to Jupiter. (Note: Rome's surviving calendars provide only fragmentary evidence for the Feriae but Wissowa believes that every Ide was sacred to him.) On the Ides, a white lamb (ovis idulis) was led along Rome's Sacred Way to the Capitoline Citadel and sacrificed to him. Jupiter's two epula Iovis festivals fell on the Ides, as did his temple foundation rites as Optimus Maximus, Victor, Invictus and (possibly) Stator.

=== Nundinae ===
The nundinae recurred every ninth day, dividing the calendar into a market cycle analogous to a week. Market days gave rural people (pagi) the opportunity to sell in town and to be informed of religious and political edicts, which were posted publicly for three days. According to tradition, these festival days were instituted by the king Servius Tullius. The high priestess of Jupiter (Flaminica Dialis) sanctified the days by sacrificing a ram to Jupiter.

=== Festivals ===
During the Republican era, more fixed holidays on the Roman calendar were devoted to Jupiter than to any other deity.

==== Viniculture and wine ====
Festivals of viniculture and wine were devoted to Jupiter, since grapes were particularly susceptible to adverse weather. Dumézil describes wine as a "kingly" drink with the power to inebriate and exhilarate, analogous to the Vedic Soma.

Three Roman festivals were connected with viniculture and wine.

The rustic Vinalia altera on 19 August asked for good weather for ripening the grapes before harvest. When the grapes were ripe, a sheep was sacrificed to Jupiter and the flamen Dialis cut the first of the grape harvest.

The Meditrinalia on 11 October marked the end of the grape harvest; the new wine was pressed, tasted and mixed with old wine to control fermentation. In the Fasti Amiternini, this festival is assigned to Jupiter. Later Roman sources invented a goddess Meditrina, probably to explain the name of the festival.

At the Vinalia urbana on 23 April, new wine was offered to Jupiter. (Note: In Roman legend Aeneas vowed all of that year's wine of Latium to Jupiter before the battle with Mezentius) Large quantities of it were poured into a ditch near the temple of Venus Erycina, which was located on the Capitol.

==== Regifugium and Poplifugium ====
The Regifugium ("King's Flight") on 24 February has often been discussed in connection with the Poplifugia on 5 July, a day holy to Jupiter. (Note: Wissowa had already connected the Poplifugia to Jupiter.) The Regifugium followed the festival of Iuppiter Terminus (Jupiter of Boundaries) on 23 February. Later Roman antiquarians misinterpreted the Regifugium as marking the expulsion of the monarchy, but the "king" of this festival may have been the priest known as the rex sacrorum who ritually enacted the waning and renewal of power associated with the New Year (1 March in the old Roman calendar). A temporary vacancy of power (construed as a yearly "interregnum") occurred between the Regifugium on 24 February and the New Year on 1 March (when the lunar cycle was thought to coincide again with the solar cycle), and the uncertainty and change during the two winter months were over. Some scholars emphasize the traditional political significance of the day.

The Poplifugia ("Routing of Armies"), a day sacred to Jupiter, may similarly mark the second half of the year; before the Julian calendar reform, the months were named numerically, Quintilis (the fifth month) to December (the tenth month). (Note: Jean Gagé thinks the murder of Servius Tullius occurred on this date, as Tarquin the Proud and his wife Tullia would have taken advtange of the occasion to claim publicly that Servius has lost the favour of the gods (especially Fortuna).) The Poplifugia was a "primitive military ritual" for which the adult male population assembled for purification rites, after which they ritually dispelled foreign invaders from Rome.

==== Epula Iovis ====
There were two festivals called epulum Iovis ("Feast of Jove"). One was held on 13 September, the anniversary of the foundation of Jupiter's Capitoline temple. The other (and probably older) festival was part of the Plebeian Games (Ludi Plebei), and was held on 13 November. In the 3rd century BC, the epulum Iovis became similar to a lectisternium.

==== Ludi ====
The most ancient Roman games followed after one day (considered a dies ater, or "black day", i. e. a day which was traditionally considered unfortunate even though it was not nefas, see also article Glossary of ancient Roman religion) the two Epula Iovis of September and November.

The games of September were named Ludi Magni; originally they were not held every year, but later became the annual Ludi Romani and were held in the Circus Maximus after a procession from the Capitol. The games were attributed to Tarquinius Priscus, and linked to the cult of Jupiter on the Capitol. Romans themselves acknowledged analogies with the triumph, which Dumézil thinks can be explained by their common Etruscan origin; the magistrate in charge of the games dressed as the triumphator and the pompa circensis resembled a triumphal procession. Wissowa and Mommsen argue that they were a detached part of the triumph on the above grounds (a conclusion which Dumézil rejects).

The Ludi Plebei took place in November in the Circus Flaminius. Mommsen argued that the epulum of the Ludi Plebei was the model of the Ludi Romani, but Wissowa finds the evidence for this assumption insufficient. The Ludi Plebei were probably established in 534 BC. Their association with the cult of Jupiter is attested by Cicero.

==== Larentalia ====
The feriae of 23 December were devoted to a major ceremony in honour of Acca Larentia (or Larentina), in which some of the highest religious authorities participated (probably including the Flamen Quirinalis and the pontiffs). The Fasti Praenestini marks the day as feriae Iovis, as does Macrobius. It is unclear whether the rite of parentatio was itself the reason for the festival of Jupiter, or if this was another festival which happened to fall on the same day. Wissowa denies their association, since Jupiter and his flamen would not be involved with the underworld or the deities of death (or be present at a funeral rite held at a gravesite).

== Name and epithets ==
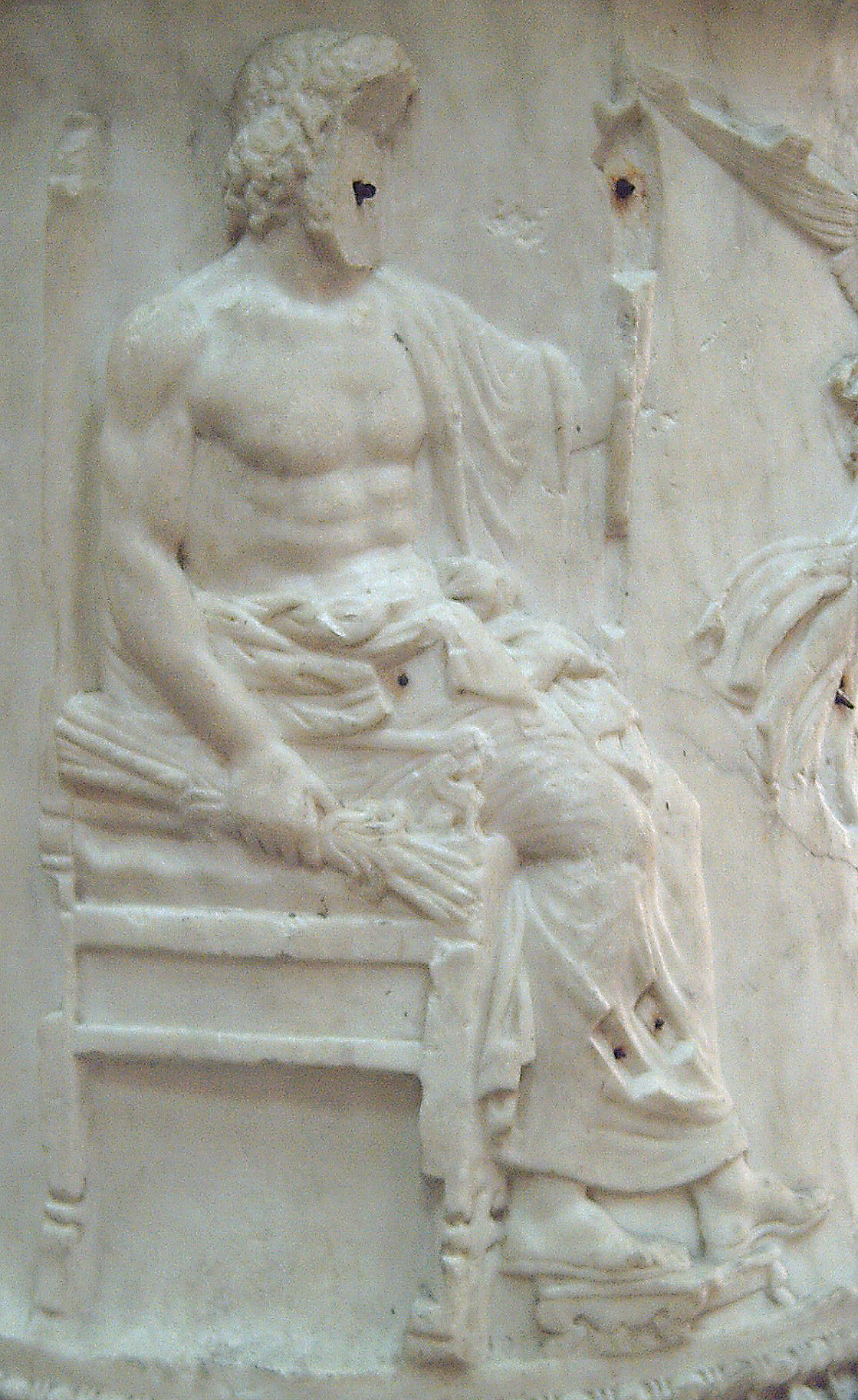
Neo-Attic bas-relief sculpture of Jupiter, holding a thunderbolt in his right hand; detail from the Moncloa Puteal (Roman, 2nd century), National Archaeological Museum, Madrid

The Latin name Iuppiter originated as a vocative compound of the Old Latin vocative *Iou and pater ("father") and came to replace the Old Latin nominative case *Ious. Jove (Note: Most common in poetry, for its useful meter, and in the expression "By Jove!") is a less common English formation based on Iov-, the stem of oblique cases of the Latin name. Linguistic studies identify the form *Iou-pater as deriving from the Proto-Italic vocable *Djous Patēr, and ultimately the Indo-European vocative compound *Dyēu-pəter (meaning "O Father Sky-god"; nominative: *Dyēus-pətēr).

Older forms of the deity's name in Rome were Dieus-pater ("day/sky-father"), then Diéspiter. The 19th-century philologist Georg Wissowa asserted these names are conceptually- and linguistically-connected to Diovis and Diovis Pater; he compares the analogous formations Vedius-Veiove and fulgur Dium, as opposed to fulgur Summanum (nocturnal lightning bolt) and flamen Dialis (based on Dius, dies). The Ancient later viewed them as entities separate from Jupiter. The terms are similar in etymology and semantics (dies, "daylight" and Dius, "daytime sky"), but differ linguistically. Wissowa considers the epithet Dianus noteworthy. Dieus is the etymological equivalent of ancient Greece's Zeus and of the Teutonics' Ziu (genitive Ziewes). The Indo-European deity is the god from which the names and partially the theology of Jupiter, Zeus and the Indo-Aryan Vedic Dyaus Pita derive or have developed.

The Roman practice of swearing by Jove to witness an oath in law courts is the origin of the expression "by Jove!"—archaic, but still in use. The name of the god was also adopted as the name of the planet Jupiter; the adjective "jovial" originally described those born under the planet of Jupiter (reputed to be jolly, optimistic, and buoyant in temperament).

Jove was the original namesake of Latin forms of the weekday now known in English as Thursday (Note: English Thursday, German Donnerstag, is named after Thunor, Thor, or Old High German Donar from Germanic mythology, a deity similar to Jupiter Tonans.) (originally called Iovis Dies in Latin). These became jeudi in French, jueves in Spanish, joi in Romanian, giovedì in Italian, dijous in Catalan, Xoves in Galician, Joibe in Friulian and Dijóu in Provençal.

=== Major epithets ===
The epithets of a Roman god indicate his theological qualities. The study of these epithets must consider their origins (the historical context of an epithet's source).

Jupiter's most ancient attested forms of cult belong to the State cult: these include the mount cult (see section above note n. 22). In Rome this cult entailed the existence of particular sanctuaries the most important of which were located on Mons Capitolinus (earlier Tarpeius). The mount had two tops that were both destined to the discharge of acts of cult related to Jupiter. The northern and higher top was the arx and on it was located the observation place of the augurs (auguraculum) and to it headed the monthly procession of the sacra Idulia. On the southern top was to be found the most ancient sanctuary of the god: the shrine of Iuppiter Feretrius allegedly built by Romulus, restored by Augustus. The god here had no image and was represented by the sacred flintstone (silex). The most ancient known rites, those of the spolia opima and of the fetials which connect Jupiter with Mars and Quirinus are dedicated to Iuppiter Feretrius or Iuppiter Lapis. The concept of the sky god was already overlapped with the ethical and political domain since this early time. According to Wissowa and Dumézil Iuppiter Lapis seems to be inseparable from Iuppiter Feretrius, in whose tiny temple on the Capitol the stone was lodged.

Another most ancient epithet is Lucetius: although the Ancients, followed by some modern scholars such as Wissowa, interpreted it as referring to sunlight, the carmen Saliare shows that it refers to lightning. A further confirmation of this interpretation is provided by the sacred meaning of lightning which is reflected in the sensitivity of the flaminica Dialis to the phenomenon. To the same atmospheric complex belongs the epithet Elicius: while the ancient erudites thought it was connected to lightning, it is in fact related to the opening of the reservoirs of rain, as is testified by the ceremony of the Nudipedalia, meant to propitiate rainfall and devoted to Jupiter. and the ritual of the lapis manalis, the stone which was brought into the city through the Porta Capena and carried around in times of drought, which was named Aquaelicium. Other early epithets connected with the atmospheric quality of Jupiter are Pluvius, Imbricius, Tempestas, Tonitrualis, tempestatium divinarum potens, Serenator, Serenus (Note: Iuppiter Serenus has been recognized as an interpretatio of the Phocean god Ζευς Ούριος.) and, referred to lightning, Fulgur, Fulgur Fulmen, later as nomen agentis Fulgurator, Fulminator: the high antiquity of the cult is testified by the neutre form Fulgur and the use of the term for the bidental, the lightning well dug on the spot hit by a lightning bolt.

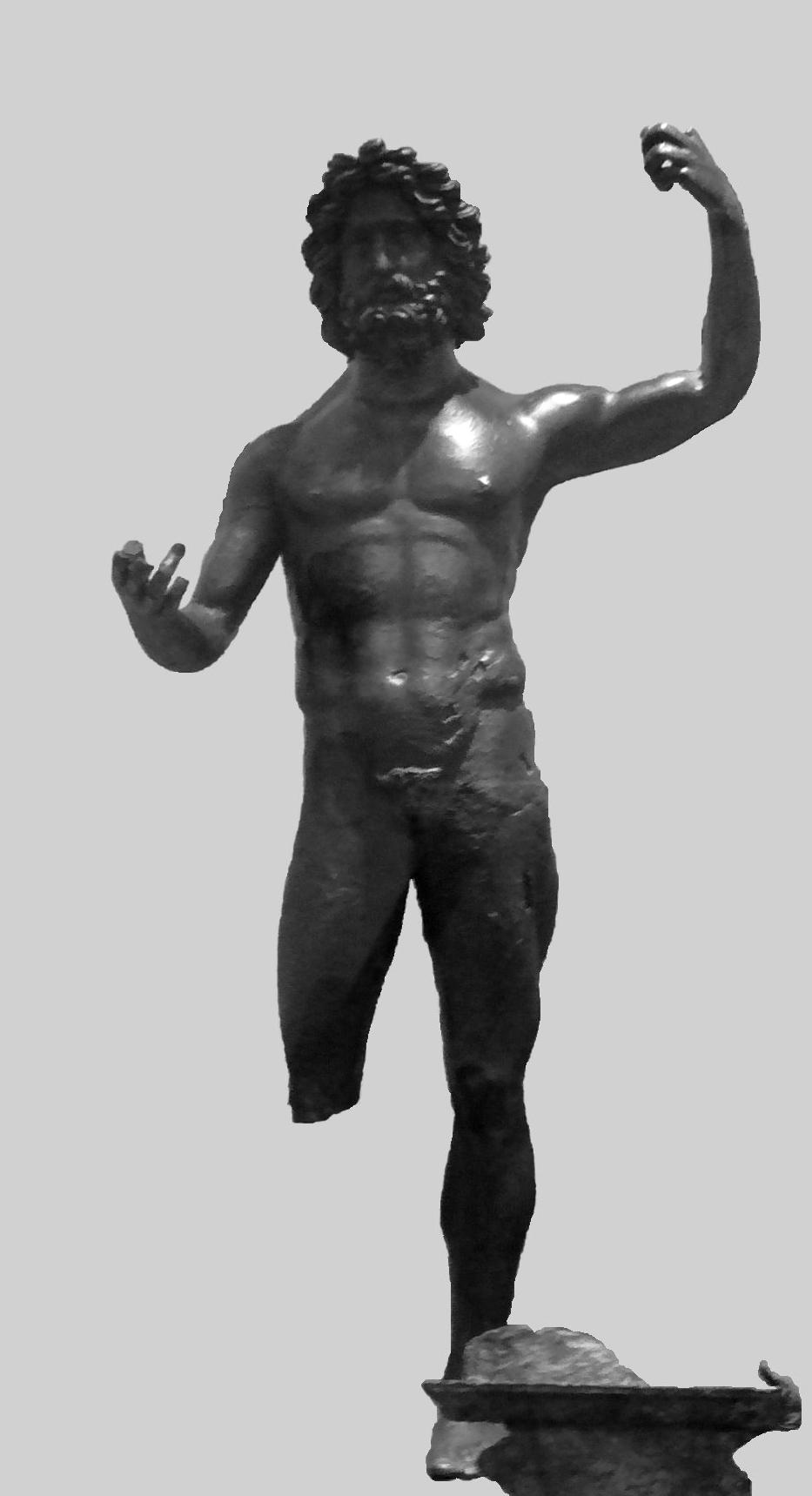
A bronze statue of Jupiter, from the territory of the Treveri

A group of epithets has been interpreted by Wissowa (and his followers) as a reflection of the agricultural or warring nature of the god, some of which are also in the list of eleven preserved by Augustine. The agricultural ones include Opitulus, Almus, Ruminus, Frugifer, Farreus, Pecunia, Dapalis, Epulo. Augustine gives an explanation of the ones he lists which should reflect Varro's: Opitulus because he brings opem (means, relief) to the needy, Almus because he nourishes everything, Ruminus because he nourishes the living beings by breastfeeding them, Pecunia because everything belongs to him. Dumézil maintains the cult usage of these epithets is not documented and that the epithet Ruminus, as Wissowa and Latte remarked, may not have the meaning given by Augustine but it should be understood as part of a series including Rumina, Ruminalis ficus, Iuppiter Ruminus, which bears the name of Rome itself with an Etruscan vocalism preserved in inscriptions, series that would be preserved in the sacred language (cf. Rumach Etruscan for Roman). However many scholars have argued that the name of Rome, Ruma, meant in fact woman's breast. Diva Rumina, as Augustine testifies in the cited passage, was the goddess of suckling babies: she was venerated near the ficus ruminalis and was offered only libations of milk. Here moreover Augustine cites the verses devoted to Jupiter by Quintus Valerius Soranus, while hypothesising Iuno (more adept in his view as a breastfeeder), i.e. Rumina instead of Ruminus, might be nothing else than Iuppiter: "Iuppiter omnipotens regum rerumque deumque Progenitor genetrixque deum...".

In Dumézil's opinion Farreus should be understood as related to the rite of the confarreatio the most sacred form of marriage, the name of which is due to the spelt cake eaten by the spouses, rather than surmising an agricultural quality of the god: the epithet means the god was the guarantor of the effects of the ceremony, to which the presence of his flamen is necessary and that he can interrupt with a clap of thunder.

The epithet Dapalis is on the other hand connected to a rite described by Cato and mentioned by Festus. Before the sowing of autumn or spring the peasant offered a banquet of roast beef and a cup of wine to Jupiter: it is natural that on such occasions he would entreat the god who has power over the weather, however Cato's prayer is one of simple offer with no request. The language suggests another attitude: Jupiter is invited to a banquet which is supposedly abundant and magnificent. The god is honoured as summus. The peasant may hope he shall receive a benefit, but he does not say it. This interpretation finds support in the analogous urban ceremony of the epulum Iovis, from which the god derives the epithet of Epulo and which was a magnificent feast accompanied by flutes.

Epithets related to warring are in Wissowa's view Iuppiter Feretrius, Iuppiter Stator, Iuppiter Victor and Iuppiter Invictus. Feretrius would be connected with war by the rite of the first type of spolia opima which is in fact a dedication to the god of the arms of the defeated king of the enemy that happens whenever he has been killed by the king of Rome or his equivalent authority. Here too Dumézil notes the dedication has to do with regality and not with war, since the rite is in fact the offer of the arms of a king by a king: a proof of such an assumption is provided by the fact that the arms of an enemy king captured by an officer or a common soldier were dedicated to Mars and Quirinus respectively.

Iuppiter Stator was first attributed by tradition to Romulus, who had prayed to the god for his almighty help at a difficult time during the battle with the Sabines of king Titus Tatius. Dumézil opines the action of Jupiter is not that of a god of war who wins through fighting: Jupiter acts by causing an inexplicable change in the morale of the fighters of the two sides. The same feature can be detected also in the certainly historical record of the battle of the third Samnite War in 294 BC, in which consul Marcus Atilius Regulus vowed a temple to Iuppiter Stator if "Jupiter will stop the rout of the Roman army and if afterwards the Samnite legions shall be victoriously massacred...It looked as if the gods themselves had taken side with Romans, so much easily did the Roman arms succeed in prevailing...". In a similar manner one can explain the epithet Victor, whose cult was founded in 295 BC on the battlefield of Sentinum by Quintus Fabius Maximus Gurges and who received another vow again in 293 by consul Lucius Papirius Cursor before a battle against the Samnite legio linteata. The religious meaning of the vow is in both cases an appeal to the supreme god by a Roman chief at a time of need for divine help from the supreme god, albeit for different reasons: Fabius had remained the only political and military responsible of the Roman State after the devotio of P. Decius Mus, Papirius had to face an enemy who had acted with impious rites and vows, i.e. was religiously reprehensible.

More recently Dario Sabbatucci has given a different interpretation of the meaning of Stator within the frame of his structuralistic and dialectic vision of Roman calendar, identifying oppositions, tensions and equilibria: January is the month of Janus, at the beginning of the year, in the uncertain time of winter (the most ancient calendar had only ten months, from March to December). In this month Janus deifies kingship and defies Jupiter. Moreover, January sees also the presence of Veiovis who appears as an anti-Jupiter, of Carmenta who is the goddess of birth and like Janus has two opposed faces, Prorsa and Postvorta (also named Antevorta and Porrima), of Iuturna, who as a gushing spring evokes the process of coming into being from non-being as the god of passage and change does. In this period the preeminence of Janus needs compensating on the Ides through the action of Jupiter Stator, who plays the role of anti-Janus, i.e. of moderator of the action of Janus.

==== Epithets denoting functionality ====
Some epithets describe a particular aspect of the god, or one of his functions:

- Jove Aegiochus, Jove "Holder of the Goat or Aegis", as the father of Aegipan.
- Jupiter Caelus, Jupiter as the sky or heavens; see also Caelus.
- Jupiter Caelestis, "Heavenly" or "Celestial Jupiter".
- Jupiter Elicius, Jupiter "who calls forth [celestial omens]" or "who is called forth [by incantations]"; "sender of rain".
- Jupiter Feretrius, who carries away the spoils of war". Feretrius was called upon to witness solemn oaths. The epithet or "numen" is probably connected with the verb ferire, "to strike", referring to a ritual striking of ritual as illustrated in foedus ferire, of which the silex, a quartz rock, is evidence in his temple on the Capitoline hill, which is said to have been the first temple in Rome, erected and dedicated by Romulus to commemorate his winning of the spolia opima from Acron, king of the Caeninenses, and to serve as a repository for them. Iuppiter Feretrius was therefore equivalent to Iuppiter Lapis, the latter used for a specially solemn oath. According to Livy I 10, 5 and Plutarch Marcellus 8 though, the meaning of this epithet is related to the peculiar frame used to carry the spolia opima to the god, the feretrum, itself from verb fero,
- Jupiter Centumpeda, literally, "he who has one hundred feet"; that is, "he who has the power of establishing, of rendering stable, bestowing stability on everything", since he himself is the paramount of stability.
- Jupiter Fulgur ("Lightning Jupiter"), Fulgurator or Fulgens
- Jupiter Lucetius ("of the light"), an epithet almost certainly related to the light or flame of lightning bolts and not to daylight, as indicated by the Jovian verses of the carmen Saliare. (Note: cume tonas, Leucesie, prai ted tremonti....)
- Jupiter Optimus Maximus ("the best and greatest"). Optumus (Note: Optimus is a superlative formed on ops [ability to help], the ancient form is optumus from opitumus, cf. the epithet Opitulus [The Helper].) because of the benefits he bestows, Maximus because of his strength, according to Cicero Pro Domo Sua.
- Jupiter Pluvius, "sender of rain".
- Jupiter Ruminus, "breastfeeder of every living being", according to Augustine.
- Jupiter Stator, from stare, "to stand": "he who has power of founding, instituting everything", thence also he who bestows the power of resistance, making people, soldiers, stand firm and fast.
- Jupiter Summanus, sender of nocturnal thunder
- Jupiter Terminalus or Iuppiter Terminus, patron and defender of boundaries
- Jupiter Tigillus, "beam or shaft that supports and holds together the universe."
- Jupiter Tonans, "thunderer"
- Jupiter Victor, "he who has the power of conquering everything."

==== Syncretic or geographical epithets ====
Some epithets of Jupiter indicate his association with a particular place. Epithets found in the provinces of the Roman Empire may identify Jupiter with a local deity or site (see syncretism).

- Jupiter Ammon, Jupiter equated with the Egyptian deity Amun after the Roman conquest of Egypt.
- Jupiter Brixianus, Jupiter equated with the local god of the town of Brescia in Cisalpine Gaul (modern North Italy).
- Jupiter Capitolinus, also Jupiter Optimus Maximus, venerated throughout the Roman Empire at sites with a Capitol (Capitolium).
- Jupiter Dolichenus, from Doliche in Syria, originally a Baal weather and war god. From the time of Vespasian, he was popular among the Roman legions as god of war and victory, especially on the Danube at Carnuntum. He is depicted as standing on a bull, with a thunderbolt in his left hand, and a double ax in the right.
- Jupiter Indiges, "Jupiter of the country", a title given to Aeneas after his death, according to Livy
- Jupiter Jehovah, syncretization between Jupiter and Jehovah (was named as El hashamayim by the hellenistic jews, which means "Lord of Heavens"). Which leaded to the syncretization between Jupiter and Jesus Christ as Hypsistos ("The Most High").
- Jupiter Ladicus, Jupiter equated with a Celtiberian mountain-god and worshipped as the spirit of Mount Ladicus in Gallaecia, northwest Iberia, preserved in the toponym Codos de Ladoco.
- Jupiter Laterius or Latiaris, the god of Latium.
- Jupiter Parthinus or Partinus, under this name was worshiped on the borders of northeast Dalmatia and Upper Moesia, perhaps associated with the local tribe known as the Partheni.
- Jupiter Poeninus, under this name worshipped in the Alps, around the Great St Bernard Pass, where he had a sanctuary.
- Jupiter Sabazius, syncretization between Jupiter and Sabazius.
- Jupiter Solutorius, a local version of Jupiter worshipped in Spain; he was syncretised with the local Iberian god Eacus.
- Jupiter Taranis, Jupiter equated with the Celtic god Taranis.
- Jupiter Uxellinus, Jupiter as a god of high mountains.

In addition, many of the epithets of Zeus can be found applied to Jupiter, by interpretatio romana. Thus, since the hero Trophonius (from Lebadea in Boeotia) is called Zeus Trophonius, this can be represented in English (as it would be in Latin) as Jupiter Trophonius. Similarly, the Greek cult of Zeus Meilichios appears in Pompeii as Jupiter Meilichius. Except in representing actual cults in Italy, this is largely 19th-century usage; modern works distinguish Jupiter from Zeus.

== Theology ==
=== Sources ===
Marcus Terentius Varro and Verrius Flaccus (Note: The work of Verrius Flaccus is preserved through the summary of Sextus Pompeius Festus and his epitomist Paul the Deacon.) were the main sources on the theology of Jupiter and archaic Roman religion in general. Varro was acquainted with the libri pontificum ("books of the Pontiffs") and their archaic classifications. On these two sources depend other ancient authorities, such as Ovid, Servius, Aulus Gellius, Macrobius, patristic texts, Dionysius of Halicarnassus and Plutarch.

One of the most important sources that preserves the theology of Jupiter and other Roman deities is The City of God against the Pagans by Augustine of Hippo. Augustine's criticism of traditional Roman religion is based on Varro's lost work, Antiquitates Rerum Divinarum. Although a work of Christian apologetics, The City of God provides glimpses into Varro's theological system and authentic Roman theological lore in general. According to Augustine, Varro drew on the pontiff Mucius Scaevola's tripartite theology:

- The mythic theology of the poets (useful for the theatre)
- The physical theology of the philosophers (useful for understanding the natural world)
- The civil theology of the priests (useful for the state)

=== Jovian theology ===
Georg Wissowa stressed Jupiter's uniqueness as the only case among Indo-European religions in which the original god preserved his name, his identity, and his prerogatives. In this view, Jupiter is the god of heaven and retains his identification with the sky among the Latin poets (his name is used as a synonym for "sky".) In this respect, he differs from his Greek equivalent, Zeus (who is considered a personal god, warden, and dispenser of skylight). His name reflects this idea; it is a derivative of the Indo-European word for "bright, shining sky". His residence is found atop the hills of Rome and of mountains in general; as a result, his cult is present in Rome and throughout Italy at upper elevations. Jupiter assumed atmospheric qualities; he is the wielder of lightning and the master of weather. However, Wissowa acknowledges that Jupiter is not merely a naturalistic, heavenly, supreme deity; he is in continual communication with man by means of thunder, lightning and the flight of birds (his auspices). Through his vigilant watch, he is also the guardian of public oaths and compacts and the guarantor of good faith in the State cult. The Jovian cult was common to the Italic people under the names Iove, Diove (Latin) and Iuve, Diuve (Oscan, in Umbrian only Iuve, Iupater in the Iguvine Tables).

Wissowa considered Jupiter also a god of war and agriculture, in addition to his political role as guarantor of good faith (public and private) as Iuppiter Lapis and Dius Fidius, respectively. His view is grounded in the sphere of action of the god (who intervenes in battle and influences the harvest through weather).

In Georges Dumézil's view, Jovian theology (and that of the equivalent gods in other Indo-European religions) is an evolution from a naturalistic, supreme, celestial god identified with heaven to a sovereign god, a wielder of lightning bolts, master and protector of the community (in other words, of a change from a naturalistic approach to the world of the divine to a socio-political approach).

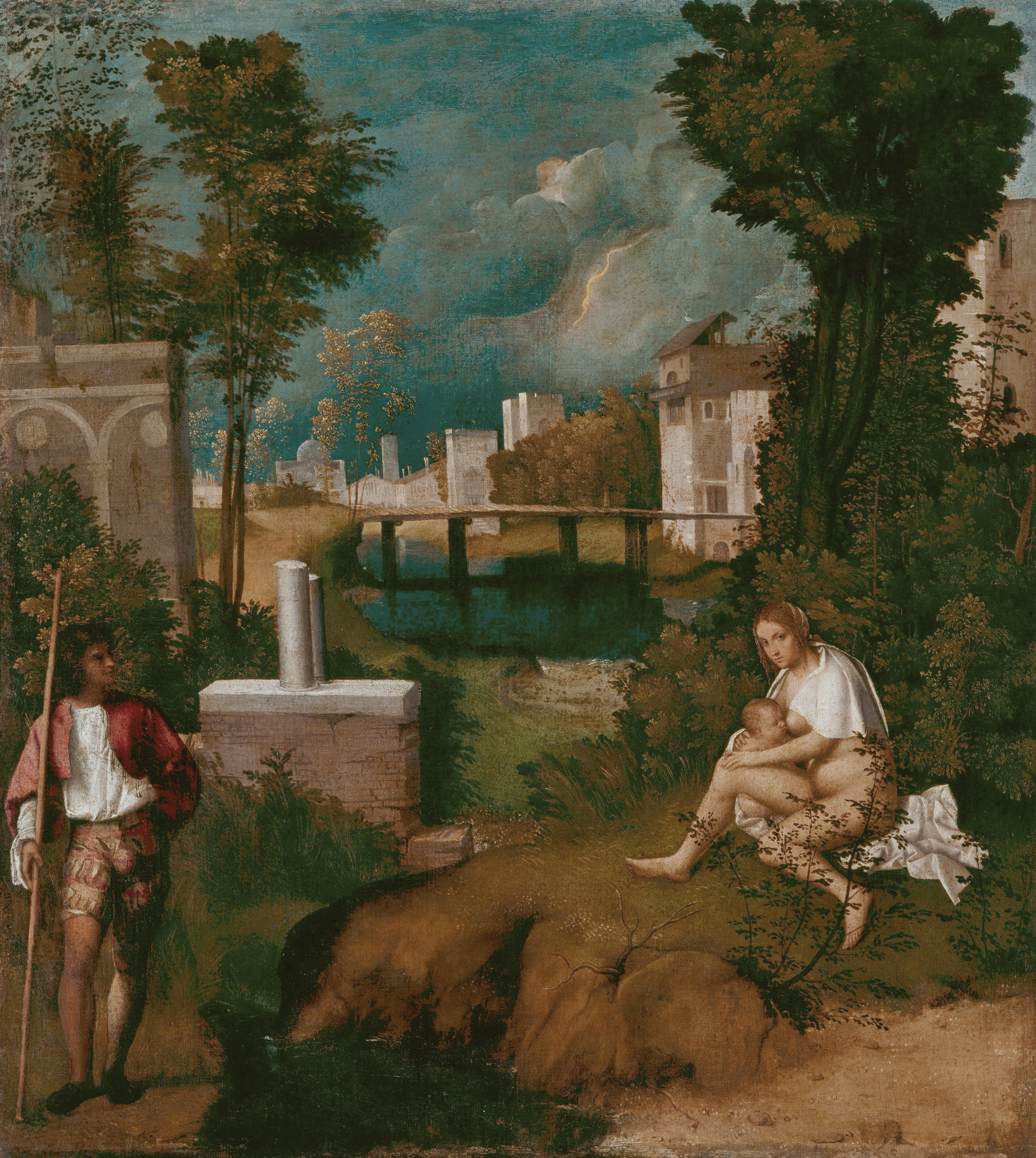
One interpretation of the lightning in Giorgione's Tempest is that it represents the presence of Jupiter.

In Vedic religion, Dyaus Pitar remained confined to his distant, passive role, and the place of the sovereign god was occupied by Varuna and Mitra. In Greek and Roman religion, instead, the homonymous gods *Diou- and Διϝ- evolved into atmospheric deities; by their mastery of thunder and lightning, they expressed themselves and made their will known to the community. In Rome, Jupiter also sent signs to the leaders of the state in the form of auspices in addition to thunder. The art of augury was considered prestigious by ancient Romans; by sending his signs, Jupiter (the sovereign of heaven) communicates his advice to his terrestrial colleague: the king (rex) or his successor magistrates. The encounter between the heavenly and political, legal aspects of the deity is well represented by the prerogatives, privileges, functions, and taboos proper to his flamen (the flamen Dialis and his wife, the flaminica Dialis).

Dumézil maintains that Jupiter is not himself a god of war and agriculture, although his actions and interests may extend to these spheres of human endeavour. His view is based on the methodological assumption that the chief criterion for studying a god's nature is not his field of action, but the quality, method, and features of his action. Consequently, the analysis of the type of action performed by Jupiter in the domains in which he operates indicates that Jupiter is a sovereign god who may act in the field of politics (as well as agriculture and war) in his capacity as such, i.e., in a way and with the features proper to a king. Sovereignty is expressed through the two aspects of absolute, magic power (epitomised and represented by the Vedic god Varuna) and lawful right (by the Vedic god Mitra). However, sovereignty permits action in every field; otherwise, it would lose its essential quality. As further proof, Dumézil cites the story of Tullus Hostilius (the most belligerent of the Roman kings), who was killed by Jupiter with a lightning bolt (indicating that he did not enjoy the god's favour). Varro's definition of Jupiter as the god who has under his jurisdiction the full expression of every being (penes Iovem sunt summa) reflects the sovereign nature of the god, as opposed to the jurisdiction of Janus (god of passages and change) on their beginning (penes Ianum sunt prima).

== Relation to other gods ==
=== Capitoline Triad ===
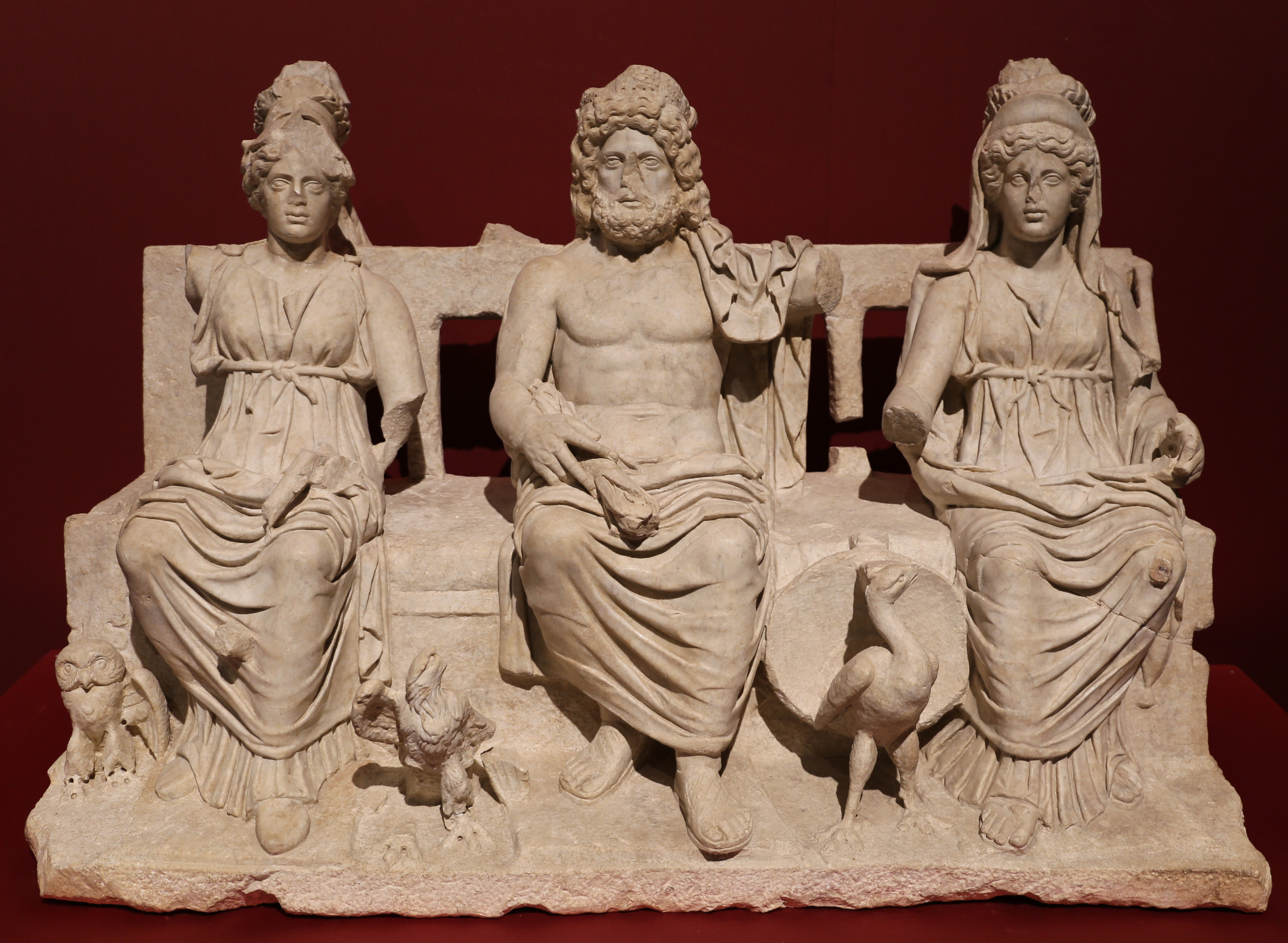
Capitoline Triad

The Capitoline Triad was introduced to Rome by the Tarquins. Dumézil thinks it might have been an Etruscan (or local) creation based on Vitruvius' treatise on architecture, in which the three deities are associated as the most important. It is possible that the Etruscans paid particular attention to Menrva (Minerva) as a goddess of destiny, in addition to the royal couple Uni (Juno) and Tinia (Jupiter). In Rome, Minerva later assumed a military aspect under the influence of Athena Pallas (Polias). Dumézil argues that with the advent of the Republic, Jupiter became the only king of Rome, no longer merely the first of the great gods.

==== Archaic Triad ====
The Archaic Triad is a hypothetical theological structure (or system) consisting of the gods Jupiter, Mars and Quirinus. It was first described by Wissowa, and the concept was developed further by Dumézil. The three-function hypothesis of Indo-European society advanced by Dumézil holds that in prehistory, society was divided into three classes:

Dumézil's trifunctional hypothesis as applied to Roman religion
Function	Subfunction	Description	Example Roman god
1		sovereignty	Jupiter
1	1 (a)	judicial	Jupiter / Fides / Dius Fidius
1	1 (b)	religious	Veiovis, Janus; Fortuna
2		warriors	Mars
2	2 (a)	protection	Minerva (Pallas Athena), Castor and Pollux, Mars, Roma
2	2 (b)	raids and conquest	Bellona, Mars,
3		production of wealth	Quirinus, Saturnus, Ops, Penates
3	3 (a)	crop farming	Saturnus, Dīs Pater, Ceres, Tellus, Quirinus
3	3 (b)	animal husbandry	Castor and Pollux, Juno, Faunus, Neptune, Hercules
3	3 (c)	commerce	Mercury; Feronia, Neptune, Portunus
3	3 (d)	manual crafts	Vulcanus, Minerva (Athena Polytechnea)
3	3 (e)	human fertility	Venus, Juno, Quirinus, Mater Matuta, Minerva, Bona Dea (late add.)
Table notes: It is unclear whether Minerva was a war goddess and / or a craftswoman before her identity was merged with Athena.; The list omits most minor deities (e.g. Attis, Cupid, Deimos, Flora, Liber, Phobos, Pomona) whom the Romans considered agents of higher-ranking gods.; Several nature gods, such as Aurora, Dianna, Feronia, Luna, Silvanus, Sol, only fit into the system via contrivance (e.g. Feronia as an agricultural god).

At least for the three main functions, people in each station in life had their religious counterparts the divine figures of the sovereign god, the warrior god, and the industrius god; there were almost always two separate gods for class 1, and sometimes more than one for class 3. Over time gods or, groups of gods might be consolidated or split, and it is unclear that there were ever any strict separations of all function.

The sovereign function (1) embodied in Jupiter entailed omnipotence; thence, a domain extended over every aspect of nature and life. (Note: The colour relating to the sovereign function is white. The war function color is red, and the production / farming function color is black.)

The three functions are interrelated with one another, overlapping to some extent; the sovereign function, although including a part that is essentially religious in nature, is involved in many ways in areas pertaining to the other two. Therefore, Jupiter is the "magic player" in the founding of the Roman state and the fields of war, agricultural plenty, human fertility, and wealth.

This hypothesis has not found widespread support among scholars.

=== Jupiter and Minerva ===
Apart from being protectress of the arts and craft as Minerva Capta, who was brought from Falerii, Minerva's association to Jupiter and relevance to Roman state religion is mainly linked to the Palladium, a wooden statue of Athena that could move the eyes and wave the spear. It was stored in the penus interior, inner penus of the aedes Vestae, temple of Vesta and considered the most important among the pignora imperii, pawns of dominion, empire. In Roman traditional lore it was brought from Troy by Aeneas. Scholars though think it was last taken to Rome in the third or second century BC.

=== Juno and Fortuna ===
The divine couple received from Greece its matrimonial implications, thence bestowing on Juno the role of tutelary goddess of marriage (Iuno Pronuba).

The couple itself though cannot be reduced to a Greek apport. The association of Juno and Jupiter is of the most ancient Latin theology. Praeneste offers a glimpse into original Latin mythology: the local goddess Fortuna is represented as milking two infants, one male and one female, namely Jove (Jupiter) and Juno. It seems fairly safe to assume that from the earliest times they were identified by their own proper names and since they got them they were never changed through the course of history: they were called Jupiter and Juno. These gods were the most ancient deities of every Latin town. Praeneste preserved divine filiation and infancy as the sovereign god and his paredra Juno have a mother who is the primordial goddess Fortuna Primigenia. Many terracotta statuettes have been discovered which represent a woman with a child: one of them represents exactly the scene described by Cicero of a woman with two children of different sex who touch her breast. Two of the votive inscriptions to Fortuna associate her and Jupiter: " Fortunae Iovi puero..." and "Fortunae Iovis puero..."

In 1882 though R. Mowat published an inscription in which Fortuna is called daughter of Jupiter, raising new questions and opening new perspectives in the theology of Latin gods. Dumézil has elaborated an interpretative theory according to which this aporia would be an intrinsic, fundamental feature of Indoeuropean deities of the primordial and sovereign level, as it finds a parallel in Vedic religion. The contradiction would put Fortuna both at the origin of time and into its ensuing diachronic process: it is the comparison offered by Vedic deity Aditi, the Not-Bound or Enemy of Bondage, that shows that there is no question of choosing one of the two apparent options: as the mother of the Aditya she has the same type of relationship with one of his sons, Dakṣa, the minor sovereign. who represents the Creative Energy, being at the same time his mother and daughter, as is true for the whole group of sovereign gods to which she belongs. Moreover, Aditi is thus one of the heirs (along with Savitr) of the opening god of the Indoiranians, as she is represented with her head on her two sides, with the two faces looking opposite directions. The mother of the sovereign gods has thence two solidal but distinct modalities of duplicity, i.e. of having two foreheads and a double position in the genealogy. Angelo Brelich has interpreted this theology as the basic opposition between the primordial absence of order (chaos) and the organisation of the cosmos.

=== Janus ===
The relation of Jupiter to Janus is problematic. Varro defines Jupiter as the god who has potestas (power) over the forces by which anything happens in the world. Janus, however, has the privilege of being invoked first in rites, since in his power are the beginnings of things (prima), the appearance of Jupiter included.

=== Saturn ===
The Latins considered Saturn the predecessor of Jupiter. Saturn reigned in Latium during a mythical Golden Age reenacted every year at the festival of Saturnalia. Saturn also retained primacy in matters of agriculture and money. Unlike the Greek tradition of Cronus and Zeus, the usurpation of Saturn as king of the gods by Jupiter was not viewed by the Latins as violent or hostile; Saturn continued to be revered in his temple at the foot of the Capitol Hill, which maintained the alternative name Saturnius into the time of Varro. A. Pasqualini has argued that Saturn was related to Iuppiter Latiaris, the old Jupiter of the Latins, as the original figure of this Jupiter was superseded on the Alban Mount, whereas it preserved its gruesome character in the ceremony held at the sanctuary of the Latiar Hill in Rome which involved a human sacrifice and the aspersion of the statue of the god with the blood of the victim.

=== Fides ===
The abstract personification Fides ("Faith, Trust") was one of the oldest gods associated with Jupiter. As guarantor of public faith, Fides had her temple on the Capitol (near that of Capitoline Jupiter).

=== Dius Fidius ===
Dius Fidius is considered a theonym for Jupiter, and sometimes a separate entity also known in Rome as Semo Sancus Dius Fidius. Wissowa argued that while Jupiter is the god of the Fides Publica Populi Romani as Iuppiter Lapis (by whom important oaths are sworn), Dius Fidius is a deity established for everyday use and was charged with the protection of good faith in private affairs. Dius Fidius would thus correspond to Zeus Pistios. The association with Jupiter may be a matter of divine relation; some scholars see him as a form of Hercules. Both Jupiter and Dius Fidius were wardens of oaths and wielders of lightning bolts; both required an opening in the roof of their temples.

The functionality of Sancus occurs consistently within the sphere of fides, oaths and respect for contracts and of the divine-sanction guarantee against their breach. Wissowa suggested that Semo Sancus is the genius of Jupiter, but the concept of a deity's genius is a development of the Imperial period.

Some aspects of the oath-ritual for Dius Fidius (such as proceedings under the open sky or in the compluvium of private residences), and the fact the temple of Sancus had no roof, suggest that the oath sworn by Dius Fidius predated that for Iuppiter Lapis or Iuppiter Feretrius.

=== Genius ===
Augustine quotes Varro who explains the genius as "the god who is in charge and has the power to generate everything" and "the rational spirit of all (therefore, everyone has their own)". Augustine concludes that Jupiter should be considered the genius of the universe.

G. Wissowa advanced the hypothesis that Semo Sancus is the genius of Jupiter. W. W. Fowler has cautioned that this interpretation looks to be an anachronism and it would only be acceptable to say that Sancus is a Genius Iovius, as it appears from the Iguvine Tables.

Censorinus cites Granius Flaccus as saying that "the Genius was the same entity as the Lar" in his lost work De Indigitamentis. probably referring to the Lar Familiaris. Mutunus Tutunus had his shrine at the foot of the Velian Hill near those of the Di Penates and of Vica Pota, who were among the most ancient gods of the Roman community, according to Wissowa.

Dumézil opines that the attribution of a Genius to the gods should be earlier than its first attestation of 58 BC, in an inscription which mentions the Iovis Genius.

A connection between Genius and Jupiter seems apparent in Plautus' comedy Amphitryon, in which Jupiter takes up the appearance of Alcmena's husband in order to seduce her: J. Hubeaux sees there a reflection of the story that Scipio Africanus' mother conceived him with a snake that was in fact Jupiter transformed. Scipio himself claimed that only he would rise to the mansion of the gods through the widest gate.

Among the Etruscan Penates there is a Genius Iovialis who comes after Fortuna and Ceres and before Pales. Genius Iovialis is one of the Penates of the humans and not of Jupiter though, as these were located in region I of Martianus Capella's division of Heaven, while Genius appears in regions V and VI along with Ceres, Favor (possibly a Roman approximation to an Etruscan male manifestation of Fortuna) and Pales. This is in accord with the definition of the Penates of man being Fortuna, Ceres, Pales and Genius Iovialis and the statement in Macrobius that the Larentalia were dedicated to Jupiter as the god whence the souls of men come from and to whom they return after death.

=== Summanus ===
The god of nighttime lightning has been interpreted as an aspect of Jupiter, either a chthonic manifestation of the god or a separate god of the underworld. A statue of Summanus stood on the roof of the Temple of Capitoline Jupiter, and Iuppiter Summanus is one of the epithets of Jupiter. Dumézil sees the opposition Dius Fidius versus Summanus as complementary, interpreting it as typical to the inherent ambiguity of the sovereign god exemplified by that of Mitra and Varuna in Vedic religion. The complementarity of the epithets is shown in inscriptions found on puteals or bidentals reciting either fulgur Dium conditum or fulgur Summanum conditum in places struck by daytime versus nighttime lightning bolts respectively. This is also consistent with the etymology of Summanus, deriving from sub and mane (the time before morning).

=== Liber ===
Iuppiter was associated with Liber through his epithet of Liber (association not yet been fully explained by scholars, due to the scarcity of early documentation). In the past, it was maintained that Liber was only a progressively-detached hypostasis of Jupiter; consequently, the vintage festivals were to be attributed only to Iuppiter Liber. Such a hypothesis was rejected as groundless by Wissowa, although he was a supporter of Liber's Jovian origin. Olivier de Cazanove contends that it is difficult to admit that Liber (who is present in the oldest calendars—those of Numa—in the Liberalia and in the month of Liber at Lavinium) was derived from another deity. Such a derivation would find support only in epigraphic documents, primarily from the Osco-Sabellic area. Wissowa sets the position of Iuppiter Liber within the framework of an agrarian Jupiter. The god also had a temple in this name on the Aventine in Rome, which was restored by Augustus and dedicated on 1 September. Here, the god was sometimes named Liber and sometimes Libertas. Wissowa opines that the relationship existed in the concept of creative abundance through which the supposedly-separate Liber might have been connected to the Greek god Dionysos, although both deities might not have been originally related to viticulture.

Other scholars assert that there was no Liber (other than a god of wine) within historical memory. Olivier de Cazanove argues that the domain of the sovereign god Jupiter was that of sacred, sacrificial wine (vinum inferium), while that of Liber and Libera was confined to secular wine (vinum spurcum); these two types were obtained through differing fermentation processes. The offer of wine to Liber was made possible by naming the mustum (grape juice) stored in amphoras sacrima.

Sacred wine was obtained by the natural fermentation of juice of grapes free from flaws of any type, religious (e. g. those struck by lightning, brought into contact with corpses or wounded people or coming from an unfertilised grapeyard) or secular (by "cutting" it with old wine). Secular (or "profane") wine was obtained through several types of manipulation (e.g. by adding honey, or mulsum; using raisins, or passum; by boiling, or defrutum). However, the sacrima used for the offering to the two gods for the preservation of grapeyards, vessels and wine was obtained only by pouring the juice into amphors after pressing. The mustum was considered spurcum (dirty), and thus unusable in sacrifices. The amphor (itself not an item of sacrifice) permitted presentation of its content on a table or could be added to a sacrifice; this happened at the auspicatio vindamiae for the first grape and for ears of corn of the praemetium on a dish (lanx) at the temple of Ceres.

Dumézil, on the other hand, sees the relationship between Jupiter and Liber as grounded in the social and political relevance of the two gods (who were both considered patrons of freedom). The Liberalia of March were, since earliest times, the occasion for the ceremony of the donning of the toga virilis or libera (which marked the passage into adult citizenship by young people). Augustine relates that these festivals had a particularly obscene character: a phallus was taken to the fields on a cart, and then back in triumph to town. In Lavinium they lasted a month, during which the population enjoyed bawdy jokes. The most honest matronae were supposed to publicly crown the phallus with flowers, to ensure a good harvest and repeal the fascinatio (evil eye). In Rome representations of the sex organs were placed in the temple of the couple Liber Libera, who presided over the male and female components of generation and the "liberation" of the semen. This complex of rites and beliefs shows that the divine couple's jurisdiction extended over fertility in general, not only that of grapes. The etymology of Liber (archaic form Loifer, Loifir) was explained by Émile Benveniste as formed on the IE theme *leudh- plus the suffix -es-; its original meaning is "the one of germination, he who ensures the sprouting of crops".

The relationship of Jupiter with freedom was a common belief among the Roman people, as demonstrated by the dedication of the Mons Sacer to the god after the first secession of the plebs. Later inscriptions also show the unabated popular belief in Jupiter as bestower of freedom in the imperial era.

=== Veiove ===
Scholars have been often puzzled by Ve(d)iove (or Veiovis, or Vedius) and unwilling to discuss his identity, claiming our knowledge of this god is insufficient. Most, however, agree that Veiove is a sort of special Jupiter or anti-Iove, or even an underworld Jupiter. In other words, Veiove is indeed the Capitoline god himself, who takes up a different, diminished appearance (iuvenis and parvus, young and gracile), in order to be able to discharge sovereign functions over places, times and spheres that by their own nature are excluded from the direct control of Jupiter as Optimus Maximus. This conclusion is based on information provided by Gellius, who states his name is formed by adding prefix ve (here denoting "deprivation" or "negation") to Iove (whose name Gellius posits as rooted in the verb iuvo "I benefit"). D. Sabbatucci has stressed the feature of bearer of instability and antithesis to cosmic order of the god, who threatens the kingly power of Jupiter as Stator and Centumpeda and whose presence occurs side by side to Janus' on 1 January, but also his function of helper to the growth of the young Jupiter. In 1858 Ludwig Preller suggested that Veiovis may be the sinister double of Jupiter.

The god (under the name Vetis) is placed in the last case (number 16) of the outer rim of the Piacenza Liver—before Cilens (Nocturnus), who ends (or begins in the Etruscan vision) the disposition of the gods. In Martianus Capella's division of heaven, he is found in region XV with the dii publici; as such, he numbers among the infernal (or antipodal) gods. The location of his two temples in Rome—near those of Jupiter (one on the Capitoline Hill, in the low between the arx and the Capitolium, between the two groves where the asylum founded by Romulus stood, the other on the Tiber Island near that of Iuppiter Iurarius, later also known as temple of Aesculapius)—may be significant in this respect, along with the fact that he is considered the father of Apollo, perhaps because he was depicted carrying arrows. He is also considered to be the unbearded Jupiter. The dates of his festivals support the same conclusion: they fall on 1 January, 7 March and 21 May, the first date being the recurrence of the Agonalia, dedicated to Janus and celebrated by the king with the sacrifice of a ram. The nature of the sacrifice is debated; Gellius states capra, a female goat, although some scholars posit a ram. This sacrifice occurred rito humano, which may mean "with the rite appropriate for human sacrifice". Gellius concludes by stating that this god is one of those who receive sacrifices so as to persuade them to refrain from causing harm.

The arrow is an ambivalent symbol; it was used in the ritual of the devotio (the general who vowed had to stand on an arrow). It is perhaps because of the arrow and of the juvenile looks that Gellius identifies Veiove with Apollo and as a god who must receive worship in order to obtain his abstention from harming men, along with Robigus and Averruncus. The ambivalence in the identity of Veiove is apparent in the fact that while he is present in places and times which may have a negative connotation (such as the asylum of Romulus in between the two groves on the Capitol, the Tiberine island along with Faunus and Aesculapius, the kalends of January, the nones of March, and 21 May, a statue of his nonetheless stands in the arx. Moreover, the initial particle ve- which the ancient supposed were part of his name is itself ambivalent as it may have both an accrescitive and diminutive value.

Maurice Besnier has remarked that a temple to Iuppiter was dedicated by praetor Lucius Furius Purpureo before the battle of Cremona against the Celtic Cenomani of Cisalpine Gaul. An inscription found at Brescia in 1888 shows that Iuppiter Iurarius was worshipped there and one found on the south tip of Tiber Island in 1854 that there was a cult to the god on the spot too. Besnier speculates that Lucius Furius had evoked the chief god of the enemy and built a temple to him in Rome outside the pomerium. On 1 January, the Fasti Praenestini record the festivals of Aesculapius and Vediove on the Island, while in the Fasti Ovid speaks of Jupiter and his grandson. Livy records that in 192 BC, duumvir Q. Marcus Ralla dedicated to Jupiter on the Capitol the two temples promised by L. Furius Purpureo, one of which was that promised during the war against the Gauls. Besnier would accept a correction to Livy's passage (proposed by Jordan) to read aedes Veiovi instead of aedes duae Iovi. Such a correction concerns the temples dedicated on the Capitol: it does not address the question of the dedication of the temple on the Island, which is puzzling, since the place is attested epigraphically as dedicated to the cult of Iuppiter Iurarius, in the Fasti Praenestini of Vediove and to Jupiter according to Ovid. The two gods may have been seen as equivalent: Iuppiter Iurarius is an awesome and vengeful god, parallel to the Greek Zeus Orkios, the avenger of perjury.

A. Pasqualini has argued that Veiovis seems related to Iuppiter Latiaris, as the original figure of this Jupiter would have been superseded on the Alban Mount, whereas it preserved its gruesome character in the ceremony held on the sanctuary of the Latiar Hill, the southernmost hilltop of the Quirinal in Rome, which involved a human sacrifice. The gens Iulia had gentilician cults at Bovillae where a dedicatory inscription to Vediove has been found in 1826 on an ara. According to Pasqualini it was a deity similar to Vediove, wielder of lightning bolts and chthonic, who was connected to the cult of the founders who first inhabited the Alban Mount and built the sanctuary. Such a cult once superseded on the Mount would have been taken up and preserved by the Iulii, private citizens bound to the sacra Albana by their Alban origin.

=== Victoria ===
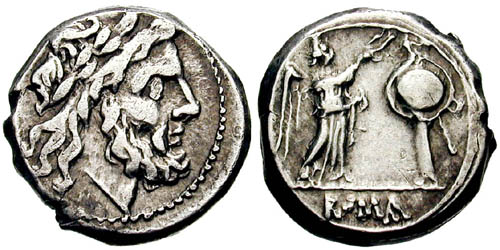
Coin with laureate head of Jupiter (obverse) and (reverse) Victory, standing ("ROMA" below in relief)

Victoria was connected to Iuppiter Victor in his role as bestower of military victory. Jupiter, as a sovereign god, was considered as having the power to conquer anyone and anything in a supernatural way; his contribution to military victory was different from that of Mars (god of military valour). Victoria appears first on the reverse of coins representing Venus (driving the quadriga of Jupiter, with her head crowned and with a palm in her hand) during the first Punic War. Sometimes, she is represented walking and carrying a trophy.

A temple was dedicated to the goddess afterwards on the Palatine, testifying to her high station in the Roman mind. When Hieron of Syracuse presented a golden statuette of the goddess to Rome, the Senate had it placed in the temple of Capitoline Jupiter among the greatest (and most sacred) deities.

Although Victoria played a significant role in the religious ideology of the late Republic and the Empire, she is undocumented in earlier times. A function similar to hers may have been played by the little-known Vica Pota.

=== Terminus ===
Juventas and Terminus were the gods who, according to legend, refused to leave their sites on the Capitol when the construction of the temple of Jupiter was undertaken. Therefore, they had to be reserved a sacellum within the new temple. Their stubbornness was considered a good omen; it would guarantee youth, stability and safety to Rome on its site. This legend is generally thought by scholars to indicate their strict connection with Jupiter. An inscription found near Ravenna reads Iuppiter Ter., indicating that Terminus is an aspect of Jupiter.

Terminus is the god of boundaries (public and private), as he is portrayed in literature. The religious value of the boundary marker is documented by Plutarch, who ascribes to king Numa the construction of temples to Fides and Terminus and the delimitation of Roman territory. Ovid gives a vivid description of the rural rite at a boundary of fields of neighbouring peasants on 23 February (the day of the Terminalia. On that day, Roman pontiffs and magistrates held a ceremony at the sixth mile of the Via Laurentina (ancient border of the Roman ager, which maintained a religious value). This festival, however, marked the end of the year and was linked to time more directly than to space (as attested by Augustine's apologia on the role of Janus with respect to endings). Dario Sabbatucci has emphasised the temporal affiliation of Terminus, a reminder of which is found in the rite of the regifugium. Dumézil, on the other hand, views the function of this god as associated with the legalistic aspect of the sovereign function of Jupiter. Terminus would be the counterpart of the minor Vedic god Bagha, who oversees the just and fair division of goods among citizens.

=== Iuventas ===
Along with Terminus, Iuventas (also known as Iuventus and Iuunta) represents an aspect of Jupiter (as the legend of her refusal to leave the Capitol Hill demonstrates. Her name has the same root as Juno (from Iuu-, "young, youngster"); the ceremonial litter bearing the sacred goose of Juno Moneta stopped before her sacellum on the festival of the goddess. Later, she was identified with the Greek Hebe. The fact that Jupiter is related to the concept of youth is shown by his epithets Puer, Iuuentus and Ioviste (interpreted as "the youngest" by some scholars). Dumézil noted the presence of the two minor sovereign deities Bagha and Aryaman beside the Vedic sovereign gods Varuna and Mitra (though more closely associated with Mitra); the couple would be reflected in Rome by Terminus and Iuventas. Aryaman is the god of young soldiers. The function of Iuventas is to protect the iuvenes (the novi togati of the year, who are required to offer a sacrifice to Jupiter on the Capitol) and the Roman soldiers (a function later attributed to Juno). King Servius Tullius, in reforming the Roman social organisation, required that every adolescent offer a coin to the goddess of youth upon entering adulthood.

In Dumézil's analysis, the function of Iuventas (the personification of youth), was to control the entrance of young men into society and protect them until they reach the age of iuvenes or iuniores (i.e. of serving the state as soldiers).

A temple to Iuventas was promised in 207 BC by consul Marcus Livius Salinator and dedicated in 191 BC.

=== Penates ===
The Romans considered the Penates as the gods to whom they owed their own existence. As noted by Wissowa Penates is an adjective, meaning "those of or from the penus" the innermost part, most hidden recess; Dumézil though refuses Wissowa's interpretation of penus as the storeroom of a household. As a nation the Romans honoured the Penates publici: Dionysius calls them Trojan gods as they were absorbed into the Trojan legend. They had a temple in Rome at the foot of the Velian Hill, near the Palatine, in which they were represented as a couple of male youth. They were honoured every year by the new consuls before entering office at Lavinium, because the Romans believed the Penates of that town were identical to their own.

The concept of di Penates is more defined in Etruria: Arnobius (citing a Caesius) states that the Etruscan Penates were named Fortuna, Ceres, Genius Iovialis and Pales; according to Nigidius Figulus, they included those of Jupiter, of Neptune, of the infernal gods and of mortal men. According to Varro the Penates reside in the recesses of Heaven and are called Consentes and Complices by the Etruscans because they rise and set together, are twelve in number and their names are unknown, six male and six females and are the cousellors and masters of Jupiter. Martianus states they are always in agreement among themselves. While these last gods seem to be the Penates of Jupiter, Jupiter himself along with Juno and Minerva is one of the Penates of man according to some authors.

This complex concept is reflected in Martianus Capella's division of heaven, found in Book I of his De Nuptiis Mercurii et Philologiae, which places the Di Consentes Penates in region I with the Favores Opertanei; Ceres and Genius in region V; Pales in region VI; Favor and Genius (again) in region VII; Secundanus Pales, Fortuna and Favor Pastor in region XI. The disposition of these divine entities and their repetition in different locations may be due to the fact that Penates belonging to different categories (of Jupiter in region I, earthly or of mortal men in region V) are intended. Favor(es) may be the Etruscan masculine equivalent of Fortuna.

== See also ==
- Ver sacrum
- Planets in astrology#Jupiter
- Zeus
- Yahweh
