= Eacus (god) =

Roman deity Jupiter Solutorius

Eacus is a weather god worshipped in Iberian Spain. He is known from the area of Castile and was syncretised with the local Roman deity Jupiter Solutorius.
