= Fetial =

Religious office in ancient Roman polytheism

A fetial (/ˈfiːʃəl/; Latin: fētiālis [feːt̪iˈaːlɪs], pl. fētiālēs) was a type of priest in ancient Rome. They formed a collegium devoted to Jupiter as the patron of good faith.

The duties of the fetials included advising the Roman Senate on foreign affairs and international treaties, making formal proclamations of peace and of war, and confirming treaties. They also carried out the functions of traveling heralds or ambassadors (Pater Patratus).

The first mention of the fetials by Livy occurs in the context of the war between Alba Longa and Rome, during which the Roman king Tullus Hostilius appointed Marcus Valerius as a fetial and Spurius Fusius as pater patratus, for the purpose of binding Rome and Alba Longa by a treaty.

According to Livy, the ritual by which the fetials were to declare war, the ritual of rerum repetitio, was introduced to Rome by Ancus Marcius, borrowing on the traditions of the Aequi. However, he had already described the ritual actions of the fetials when recording the wars of Tullus Hostilius. Thus some scholars think the mentions of the Aequi may be a misinterpretation due to a folk etymology connecting Aequi to aequus, the Latin adjective for fair (from which equitable in English). On the other hand ancient sources support the tradition that the priesthood was created under the influence of Aequian king Fertor Resius.

== Rerum repetitio ==
The ritual of rerum repetitio, a request of restitution or reparations, involved the pater patratus. Wearing a woolen hair-band, he was to announce Roman demands using a series of prescribed phrases, first at the enemy's frontier, then when he passed over the borders, again to the first man he met, again on entering the enemy's gate, and again on entering the forum in the presence of local magistrates. If the demands were not met, the pater patratus declared war within 33 days and returned to Rome to await the resolution of the King of Rome and Roman Senate. Once these had resolved to go to war, a fetial returned to the enemy frontier carrying a javelin whose tip, of steel or fire-hardened wood, had been dipped in blood. From his own side of the border he declared war on the enemy, then threw the javelin into their territory.

The fetials were concerned with matters of law and not directly with war, so that their formulae never invoked Mars, but rather Jupiter, Juno, Janus or Quirinus.

The religious relevance of the collegium or sodalitas lay in ensuring that Rome enjoyed the protection of gods in its relationships with foreign states.

This collegium was probably common to other Latin cities, as Livy makes reference to the fetials of Alba.

== Etymology ==
According to some scholars, the name derives from the noun root *feti-, which means 'foundation' and not 'stipulation'. It is allied to the basic religious concept of fas, both being rooted in IE *dh(e)s, originally meaning 'to set, setting'. This root has given the verb facere, 'to do, make' by a semantic shift. Both fetial and fas preserve the original sense of 'foundation' here, as in Vedic dhaman, dhatu in its religious sense.

== Religious implications ==
The implications of this etymology would hint to the fact that outside their own ager Romans felt the need for a religious, founding justification of their actions as a people toward other ones. A need was felt to go beyond the sphere of human law or right. While juridical justification was acknowledged as necessary Romans wanted to ensure the approval of what founds right and makes it possible, the fas. This attitude is testified by the ceremonies held by the fetials that confer religious value to political decisions and specifications in their dealing with foreign nations, aimed at placing the gods on the side of Rome and hence effectively entrusting to them the fate of Rome.

== Details of the operative duties of the fetials ==
The sodalitas dispatched two of its members, of whom only one, called the pater patratus, was active, while the other, called verbenarius, was limited in function to accompanying the pater patratus with sacred herbs (sagmina of vervain) gathered on the Capitolium.

We know the ceremonies and formulae of two circumstances: (1) conclusion of a treaty and (2) request of reparations and declaration of war.

In the first circumstance the pater patratus called bystanders and the gods to witness, staked the word of Rome, and vowed Rome to divine wrath if it should not abide by its word, asking for execratio. Oaths were made by Jupiter Lapis (per Iovem Lapidem). The flintstone was believed to be a seat of Jupiter's because if struck it emitted sparks, thus being analogous to lightning.

The ceremony has two known variants. In the first one the pater patratus hits a pig with flintstone taken from the temple of Jupiter Feretrius pronouncing the formula referred by Livy; in the second he throws the flintstone and vows Rome to fall as the stone itself if it should fail to abide by the oath.

When Rome asked for reparations for an offense or damage, the fetials were sent as ambassadors to the foreign country concerned. If the requests borne by the pater patratus were not met, he went back to Rome after invoking Jupiter, Juno (or Janus), and Quirinus, along with the heavenly gods, the terrestrial gods, and the gods of the netherworld as witnesses of the violation of the ius and after declaring war within 30 or 33 days. When this period of time had expired he went back to the border and opened the hostilities with a magic gesture: while affirming once again the good right of Rome he threw a spear with steel point or a javelin of corniolum hardened with fire into the enemy's territory.

The fetials were a common institution of the Latins and of other Italic people.

According to G. Dumézil, the initial contract concluded with the gods and extended through the sacra and the signa is sufficient to justify the acts of official religious authorities (such as pontiffs and augurs) within the Roman ager. Actions beyond this boundary require an additional religious foundation, based not only on ius but also, on a deeper level, the fas on which ius is based. This is the task of the fetials who achieve their aim through the *feti-, word that as Vedic dhātu means founding. They rely on a set of ceremonies that bestow a religious value on the political or military decisions of the magistrates, ensuring that under any circumstance Rome has the gods on her side. Besides offering their advice on international issues to the senate or the consuls, the sodalitas dispatches two envoys (the pater patratus and the verbenarius, the last one having only the task of carrying the sagmina taken from the Capitol Hill) to ask for the reparations, to declare war in a form that is pious and just, and lastly to conclude the peace. The god under whose protection they act and whom the pater patratus invokes is Iupiter Lapis in the rite of the conclusion of a treaty and in general when there an agreement is reached. If a declaration of war ensues the fetial calls as witnesses Jupiter, Juno (or Janus, correction accepted by most editors), Quirinus, the heavenly, earthly and nether gods of the violation of the ius and declares war within thirty-three days.

== Political implications of the ius fetiale ==
The author of Cicero's apocryphal speech of Furius Filus and the Christian apologists blamed the Romans for craftily using the ius fetiale in order to ensure divine support for Rome in international disputes. They allege that Romans were not moved by a desire for justice in their use of the ius fetiale, but rather bent its rules and made a disproportionately excessive use of its technicalities to acquire an undue advantage over other peoples with the ultimate goal of stealing their lands and riches.

== Bibliography ==
- Catalano, Pierangelo (1965). Linee del sistema sovrannazionale romano (in Italian). G Giappichelli.
- Ogilvie, R M (1970). Commentary on Livy: Books 1–5 (Reprinted with addenda ed.). Oxford: Clarendon Press. ISBN 0-19-814432-6.
- Livy (1905) [1st century AD]. Ab urbe condita [From the founding of the city]. Translated by Roberts, Canon – via Wikisource. See especially 1.24, 1.32.
- Zack, Andreas (2001). Studien zum "römischen Völkerrecht". Göttinger Forum für Altertumswissenschaft (in German). Göttingen: Duehrkohp & Radicke. ISBN 978-3-89744-139-2. OCLC 48730183.
