= Jupiter Stone =

Stone in Jupiter temple used for oaths

The Jupiter Stone, or in Latin, the Iuppiter Lapis, was a stone, which, in the Roman tradition, oaths were sworn upon. It was located in the Temple of Jupiter on Capitoline Hill. Iuppiter Lapis was held in the Roman tradition to be an oath stone, an aspect of Jupiter in his role as divine lawmaker responsible for order and used principally for the investiture of the oathtaking of office. It was often used by fetials during ritual, sometimes referred to as flint (lapis silex), and was used as a knife in which to slit a pigs throat in sacrifice.

During the ceremony of treaty-making, the fetial was a priest who occasionally represented all of the Roman people. They would use the silex to sacrifice a pig, saying "Do thou, Diespiter, strike the Roman people as I strike this pig here to-day, and strike them the more, as thou art greater and stronger." This, along with the fact there was no statue sighted in the temple, supported the idea that the Romans believed the stone to be a physical representation of the god Jupiter.

The stone was used primarily for oath making, which they swore upon Jupiter when creating a treaty. If the oath was broken, Jupiter was asked to kill the traitor.

== See also ==
- List of individual rocks
- Fetishism
