= Apex (headdress) =

Ancient Roman cap worn by flamines and Salii

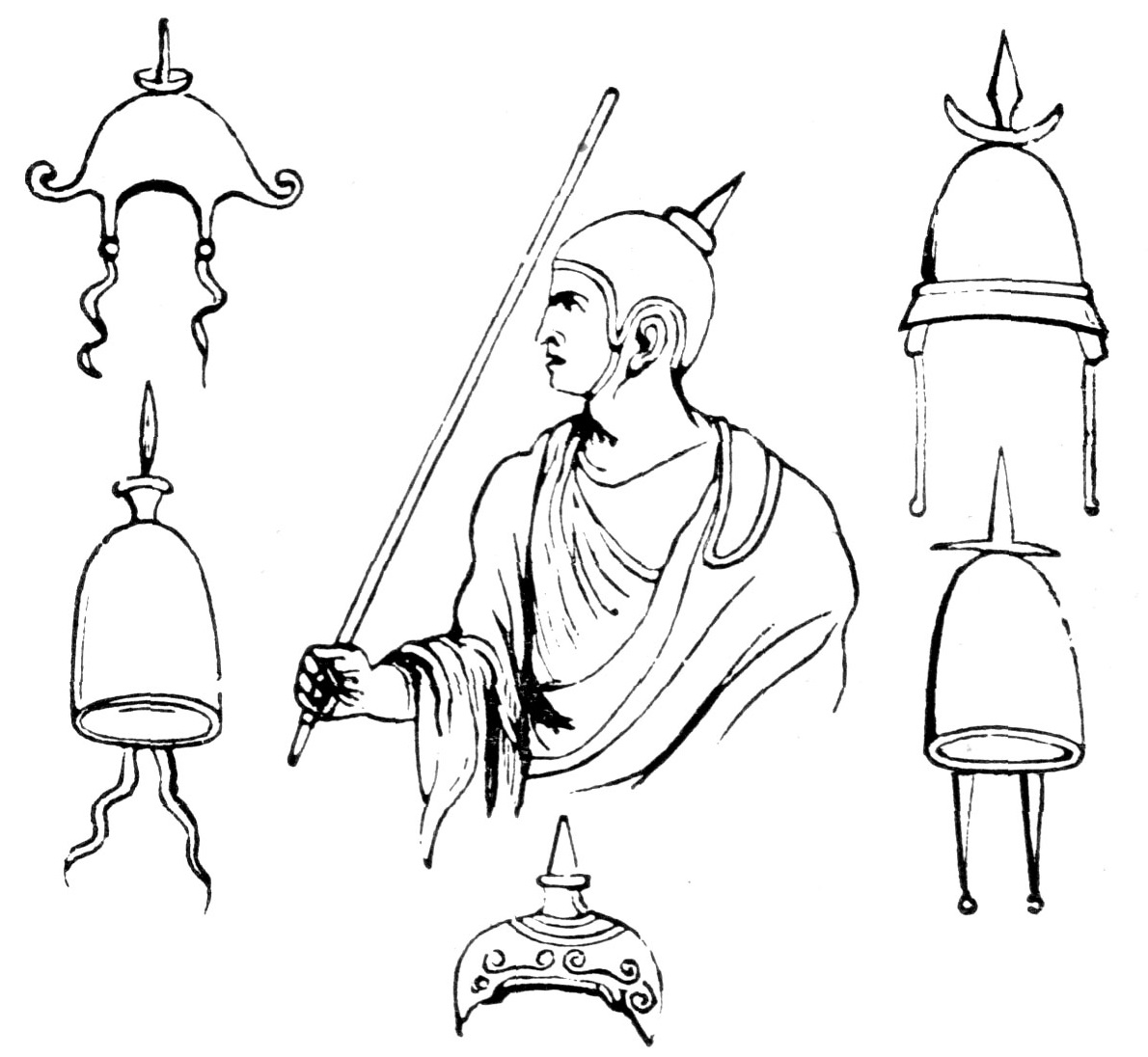
Illustrations of apices

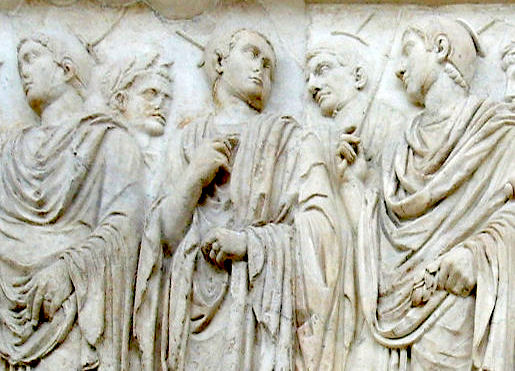
Detail of the relief from the Augustan Altar of Peace showing flamines wearing the pointed apex

The apex (plural: apices) was a cap worn by certain priests (the flamines and Salii) in ancient Rome.

The essential part of the apex, to which alone the name properly belonged, was a pointed piece of olive-wood called diminutively an apicula, the base of which was surrounded with a lock of wool. This was worn on the top of the head, and was held there either by fillets only, or, as was more commonly the case, was also fastened by means of two strings or bands, or offendices, though the latter word is also interpreted to mean a kind of button, by which the strings were fastened under the chin.

The flamines were forbidden by law to go into public - or even into the open air - without the apex, and hence we find the expression of alicui apicem dialem imponere used as equivalent to the appointment of a Flamen Dialis. Sulpicius was deprived of the priesthood, only because the apex fell from his head whilst he was sacrificing.

Dionysius of Halicarnassus describes the cap as being of a conical form. On ancient monuments it can appear round or conical.

The albogalerus, or albus galerus was a white cap worn by the flamen dialis, made of the skin of a white victim sacrificed to Jupiter, and had the apex fastened to it by means of an olive-twig.

From the word apex was formed the epithet apicatus, applied to the flamen dialis by Ovid.
