= Auguraculum =

Roofless temple oriented to cardinal points

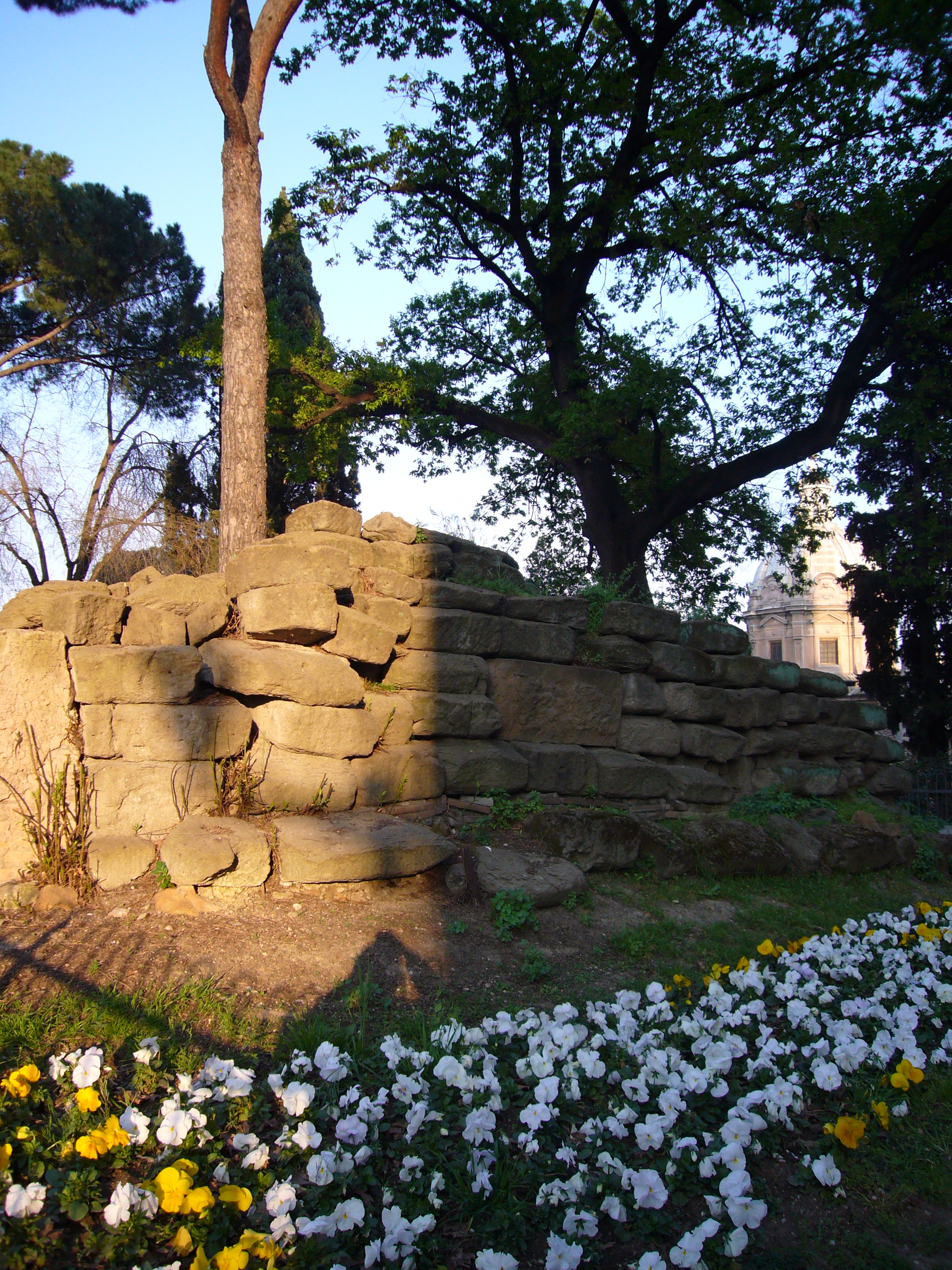
Auguraculum in Rome, Italy

The auguraculum (pl.: auguracula) was a roofless temple oriented to the cardinal points, in which the priests of ancient Rome practiced augury and ornithomancy. The priest observer was positioned at the center of the temple, in a tent or a hut, and watched portions of the sky from which came the birds, which were marked out by stones placed along the perimeter of the temple. From this observation, the priest was believed to be able to predict the future.

The auguraculum was structurally a very simple device, a small thatched hut, which appears to have been regularly renewed. There were three permanent auguracula in Rome: on the citadel, on the Quirinal Hill, and on the Palatine Hill. Festus said that originally the auguraculum was just the arx. It faced east, situating the north on the augur's left or lucky side. Within the auguraculum, the elected monarch, during the Roman Kingdom, was seated by the augurs with his face to the south. A magistrate who was serving as a military commander also took daily auspices, and thus a part of camp-building while on campaign was the creation of a tabernaculum augurale. This augural tent was the center of religious and legal proceedings within the camp.

== Gallery ==
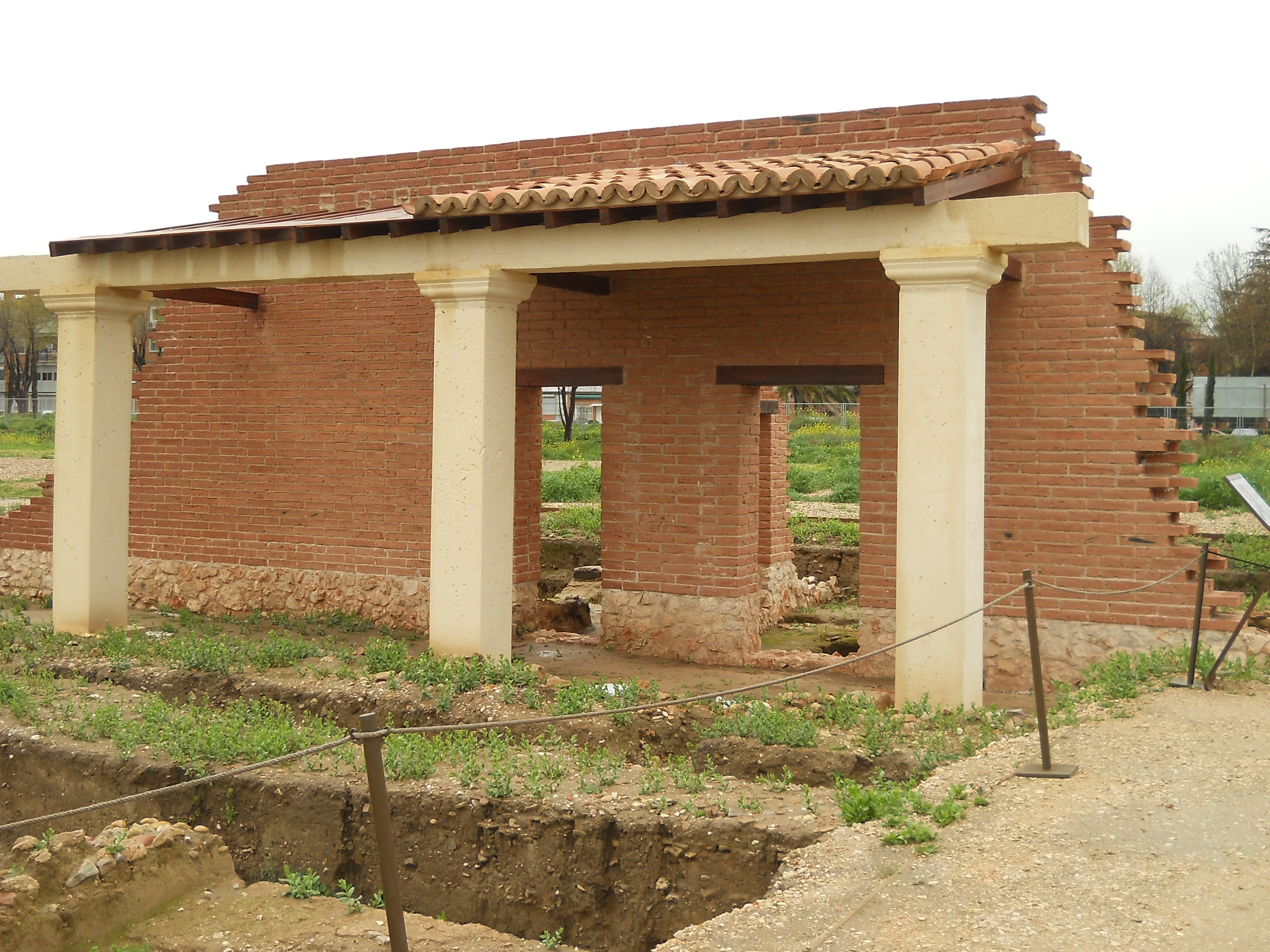
Auguraculum at the Complutum archaeological site, Alcalá de Henares, Madrid, Spain.

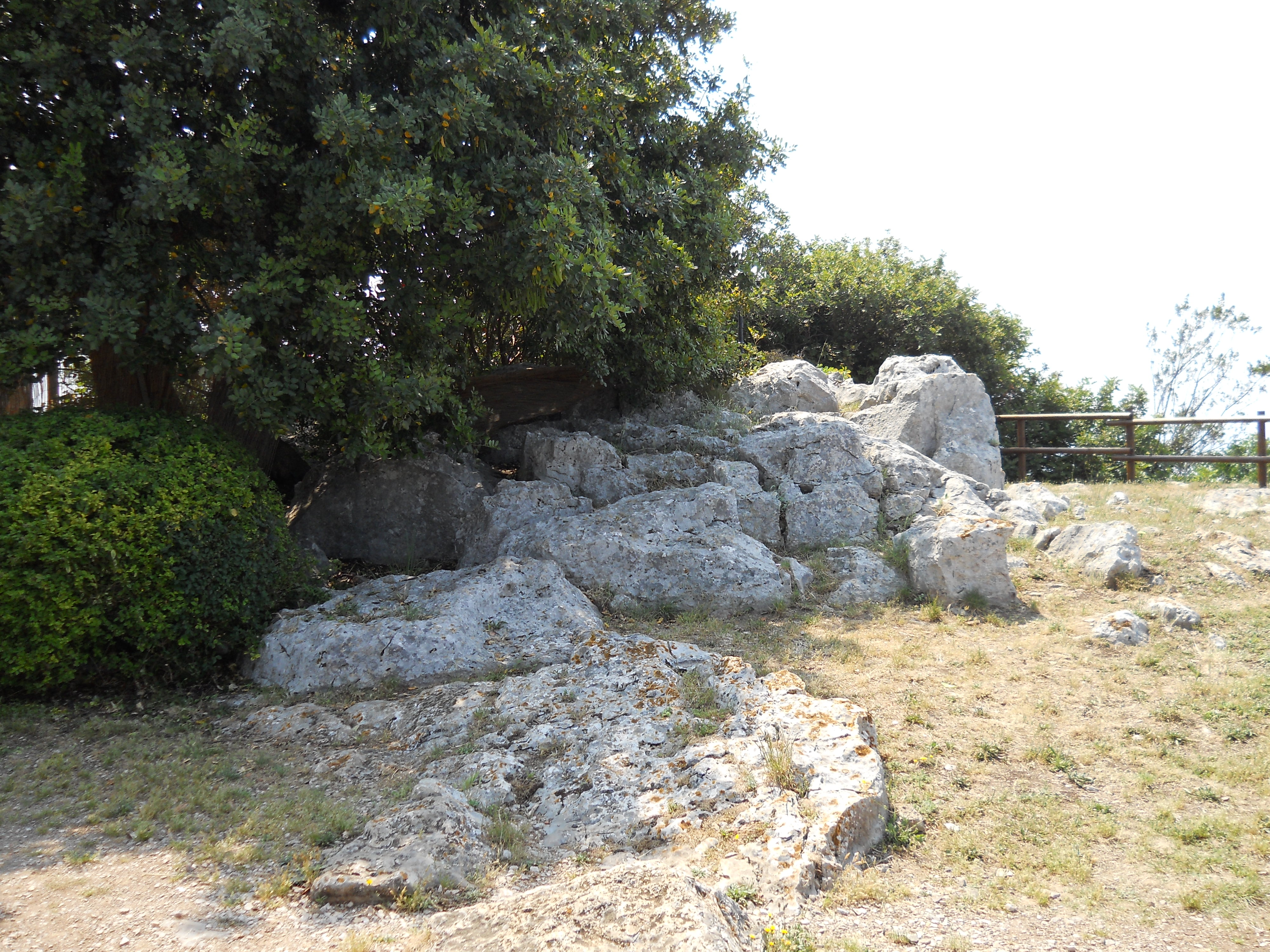
Auguraculum at the Sanctuary of Monte Sant'Angelo

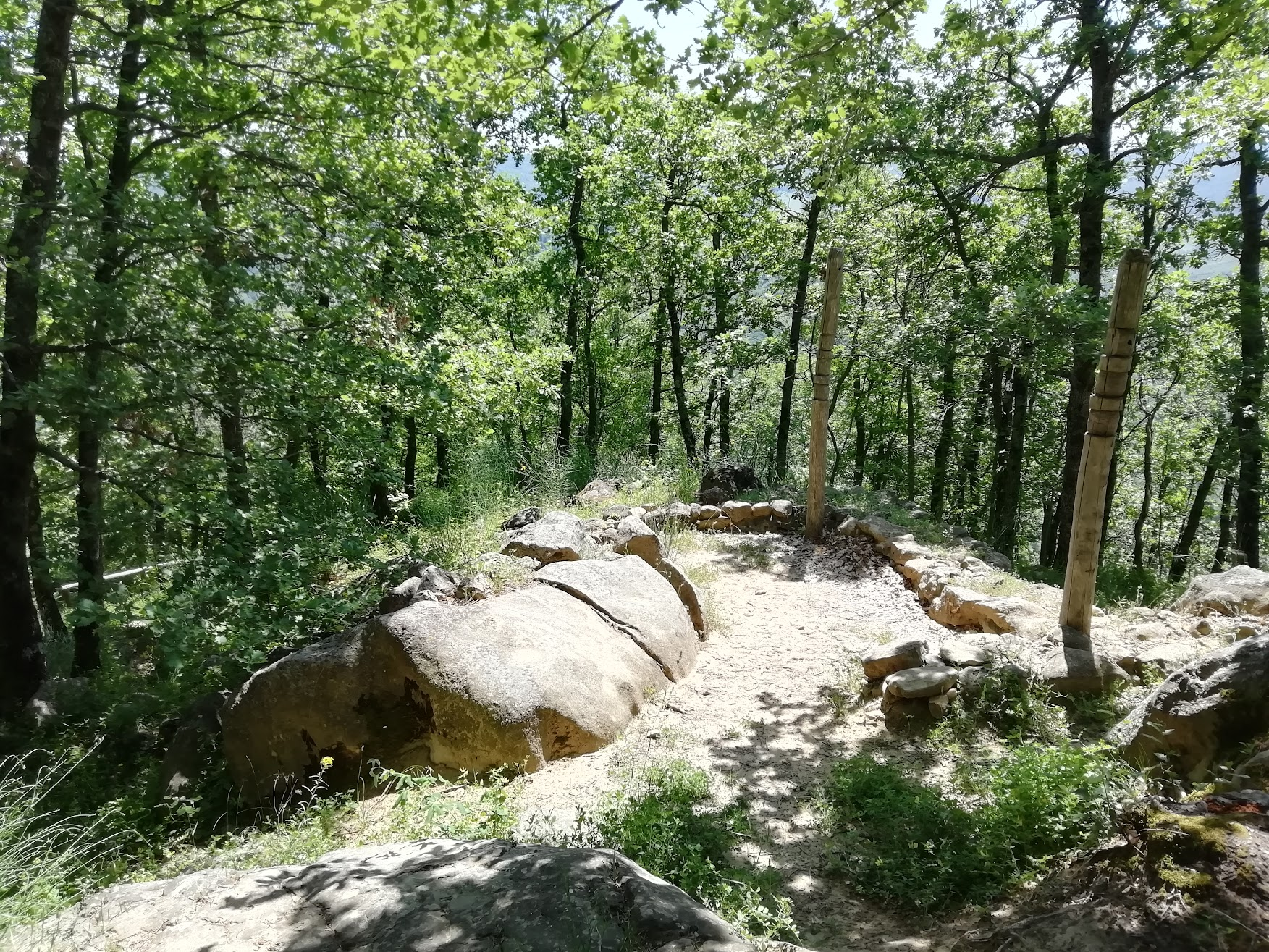
Auguraculum at the archaeological site of the Etruscan-Celtic settlement at Mont Bibele

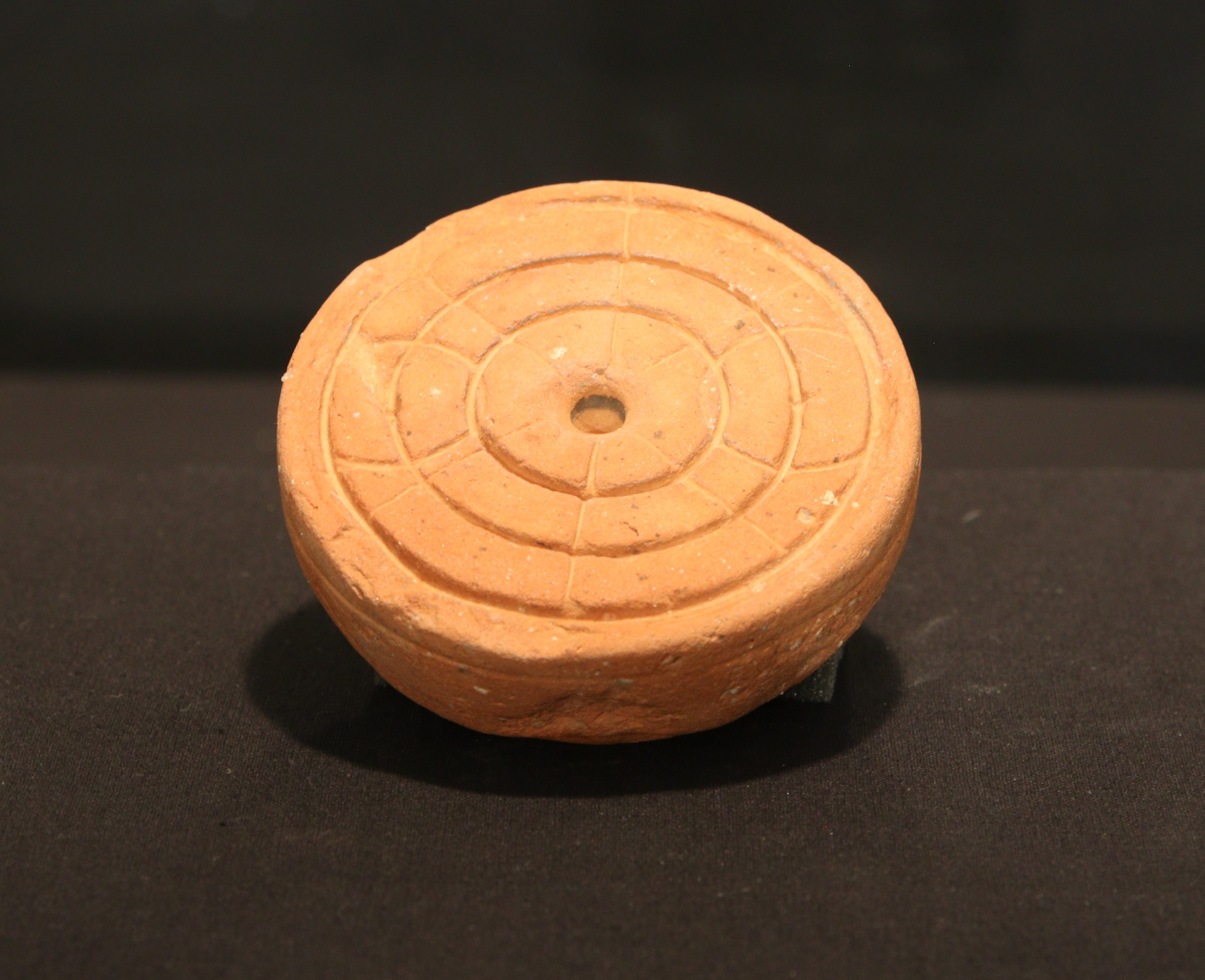
Sundial found near the auguraculum of Pianella di Monte Savino
