= Arx (Roman) =

Ancient Roman citadel

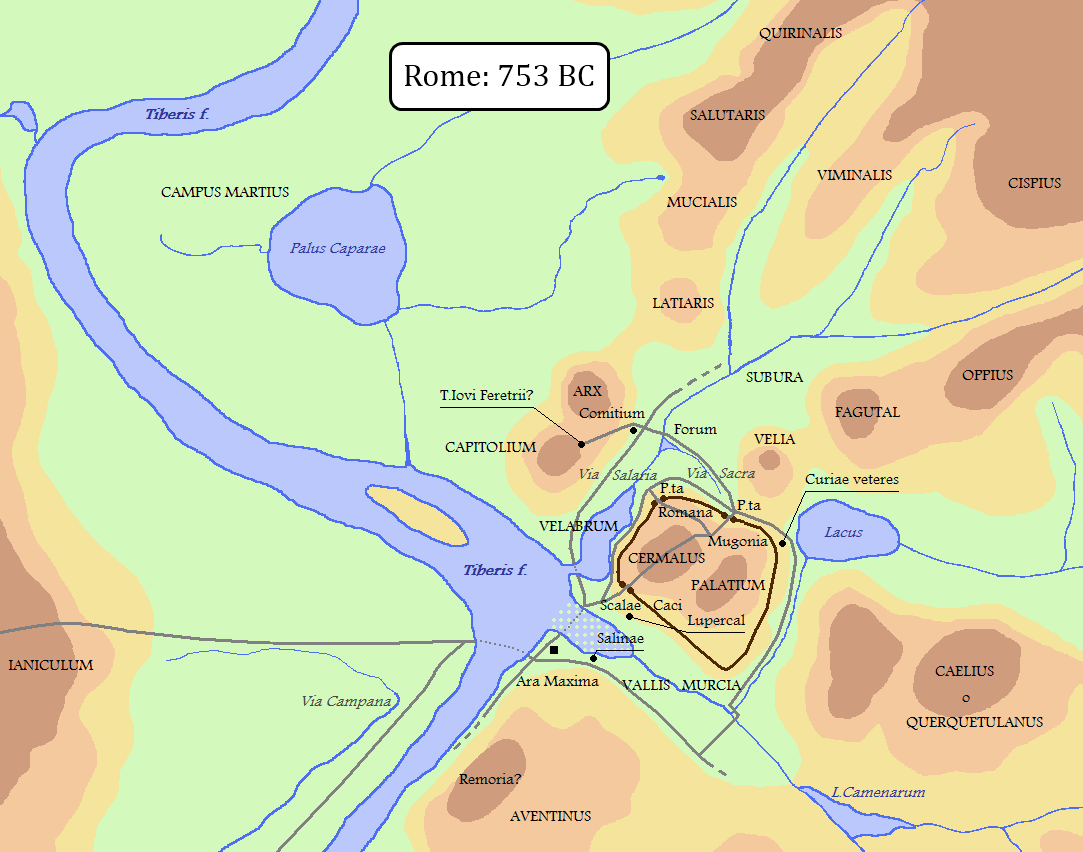
The location of the Arx is indicated on this speculative map of Rome c. 753 BC.

Arx is a Latin word meaning "citadel". In the ancient city of Rome, the arx was located on the northern spur of the Capitoline Hill, and is sometimes specified as the Arx Capitolina.

== History ==
At Rome, sentries were traditionally posted on the Arx to watch for signals displayed on the Janiculan Hill if an enemy approached. A red flag would be raised and a trumpet blown. The Arx was not regularly garrisoned, however, and should not be regarded as a "fort." However, in the Gallic siege of Rome (387 BC), the Arx was considered the point of last retreat, the capture of which was synonymous with the capture of the city. It held a symbolic power beyond its importance in military strategy, and was a central place in archaic Roman religion.

During the regal period, some members of the elite were permitted to live on the Arx, among them the legendary Sabine leader Titus Tatius. After 384 BC, the Roman Senate banned all private dwellings from the Capitoline Hill, including the Arx. The house of Marcus Manlius Capitolinus, a patrician champion of the plebs who was convicted of seeking kingship, was torn down at this time and later became the site of the Temple of Juno Moneta.

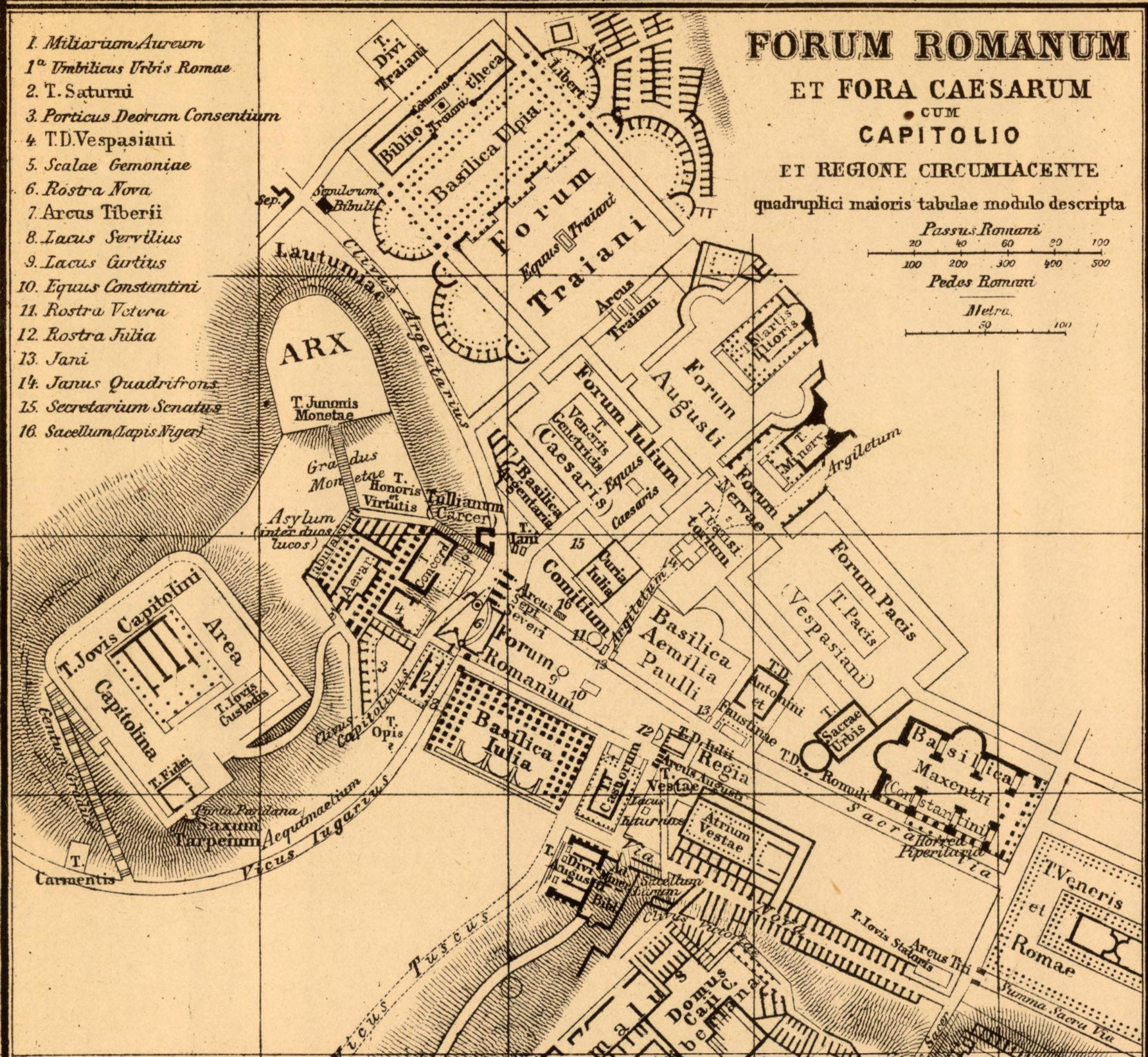
The Arx on Heinrich Kiepert map.

On the Arx was located the auguraculum, the open space where the augurs conducted the rituals that determined whether the gods approved of whatever undertaking was at hand, public business or military action. This auguraculum was the stone where the elected monarch, during the Roman Kingdom, was seated by the augurs with his face to the south.

Major temples on the Arx include that of Juno Moneta (established 344 BC), where the mint was located; Concordia (217 BC); Honor and Virtue; and Vediovis. Jupiter, however, was the god of the Arx.

== Other arces ==
The Romans also referred to the citadel of other cities as an arx (plural arces). Excavations in Cosa, Tuscany, conducted in 1948–54 and 1965–72, uncovered the settlement's arx. Frank E. Brown and his team studied the site extensively when they began the Cosa excavations in 1948. The citadel was a fortified hill on which were built several temples, including the so-called "capitolium" of Cosa.

In Lavinium, south of Rome, Castello Borghese is thought to be the possible site of the Roman-era arx constructed in the port city.

The arx of Londinium was located in the northwest corner of the present-day City of London, south of Cripplegate. It was constructed around 120 and dismantled around the time of Diocletian.
