= Complutum =

Ancient Roman city

Coordinates: 40°28′25″N 03°23′03″W

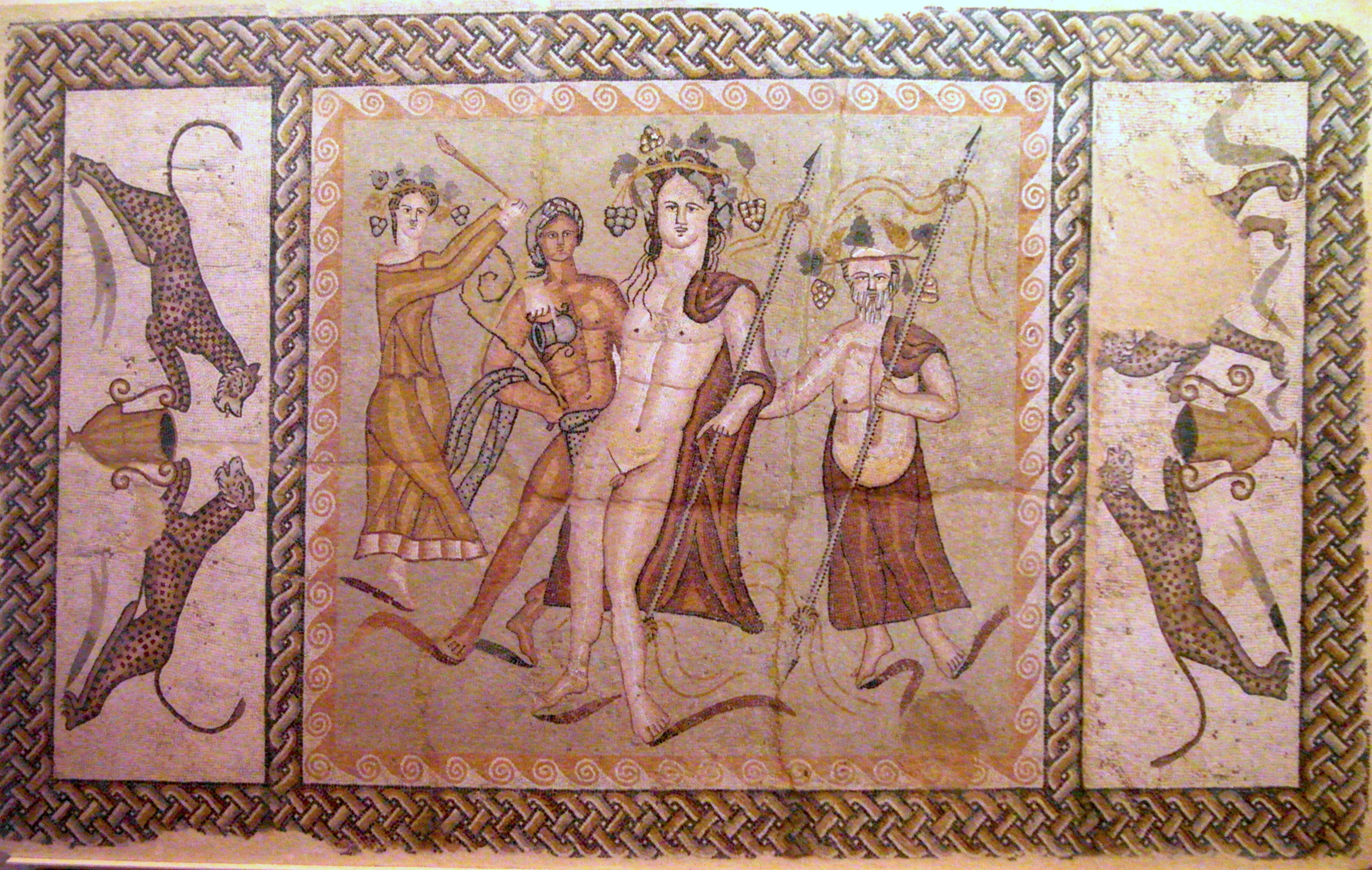
Mosaic of Bacchus

Complutum was an ancient Roman city located in the present-day city of Alcalá de Henares, Spain. It has been partially excavated and the impressive remains can be seen today at the Complutum archaeological site south west of the current city, about a kilometre from the medieval centre.

== History ==
Map of Carpetani and nearby pre-Roman tribal territories, and Roman cities

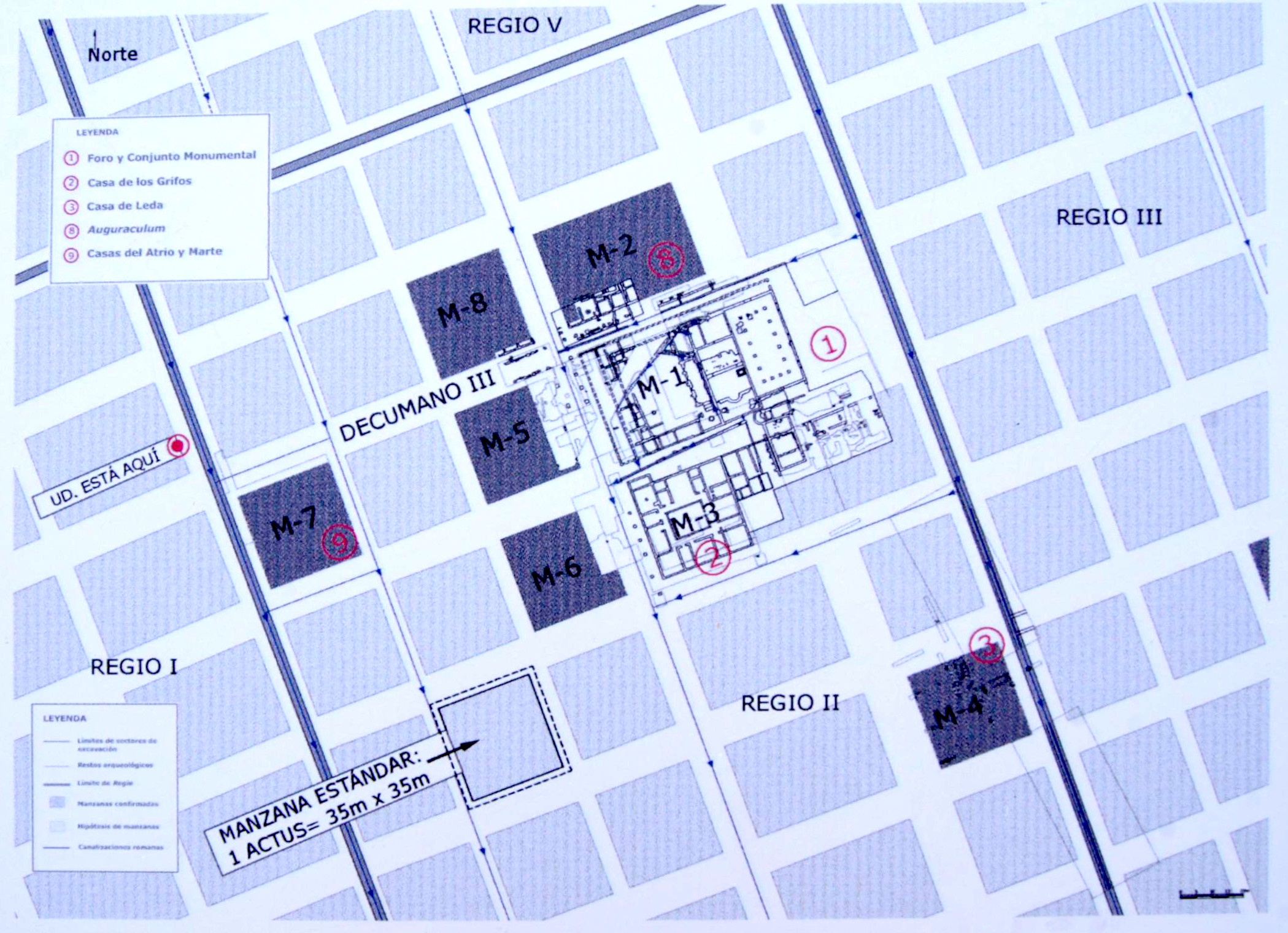
Map of Complutum; 2: House of Griffins; 3: House of Leda

The town grew up at a favourable site near the junction of several communication routes and near natural resources, such as the Henares river and the arable meadows around it.

It was a town of the Celtiberian Carpetani tribe in the 3rd and 2nd centuries BC whose hill fort (oppidum) occupied the Viso Hill nearby on the far side of the Henares river at a defensive position.

After the Roman conquest in the first century BC there was a first, unsuccessful city project on the same site but soon afterwards the citizens themselves chose to build a new city in the fertile valley of the Henares. This major project was in two stages, first under Augustus and then under Claudius (around 50 AD). In 74 AD Vespasian gave the city the status of municipium. It became the main urban centre and capital of a vast political territory, covering most of the current region of Madrid and Guadalajara.

The city was greatly enhanced in the 3rd century, despite the crisis that the empire experienced from then until its fall in the 5th.

During the Diocletian persecutions (r. 284–305) two young brothers (Justus was 13 years old, Pastor less than 9) were killed as Christian martyrs and are today the patron saints of Alcalá.

During the Visigothic period, an important road ran south from Complutum to the Mediterranean and north to Gaul.

The absence of archaeological legislation in the 19th century led to many objects being taken and sold. About half of Complutum was destroyed between 1970 and 1974 with the construction of the Reyes Católicos suburb.

In 1985 the Spanish Historical Heritage Law was approved, and the first scientific and regulated campaigns were carried out between 1985 and 1990, and again in 2003.

== The Site ==
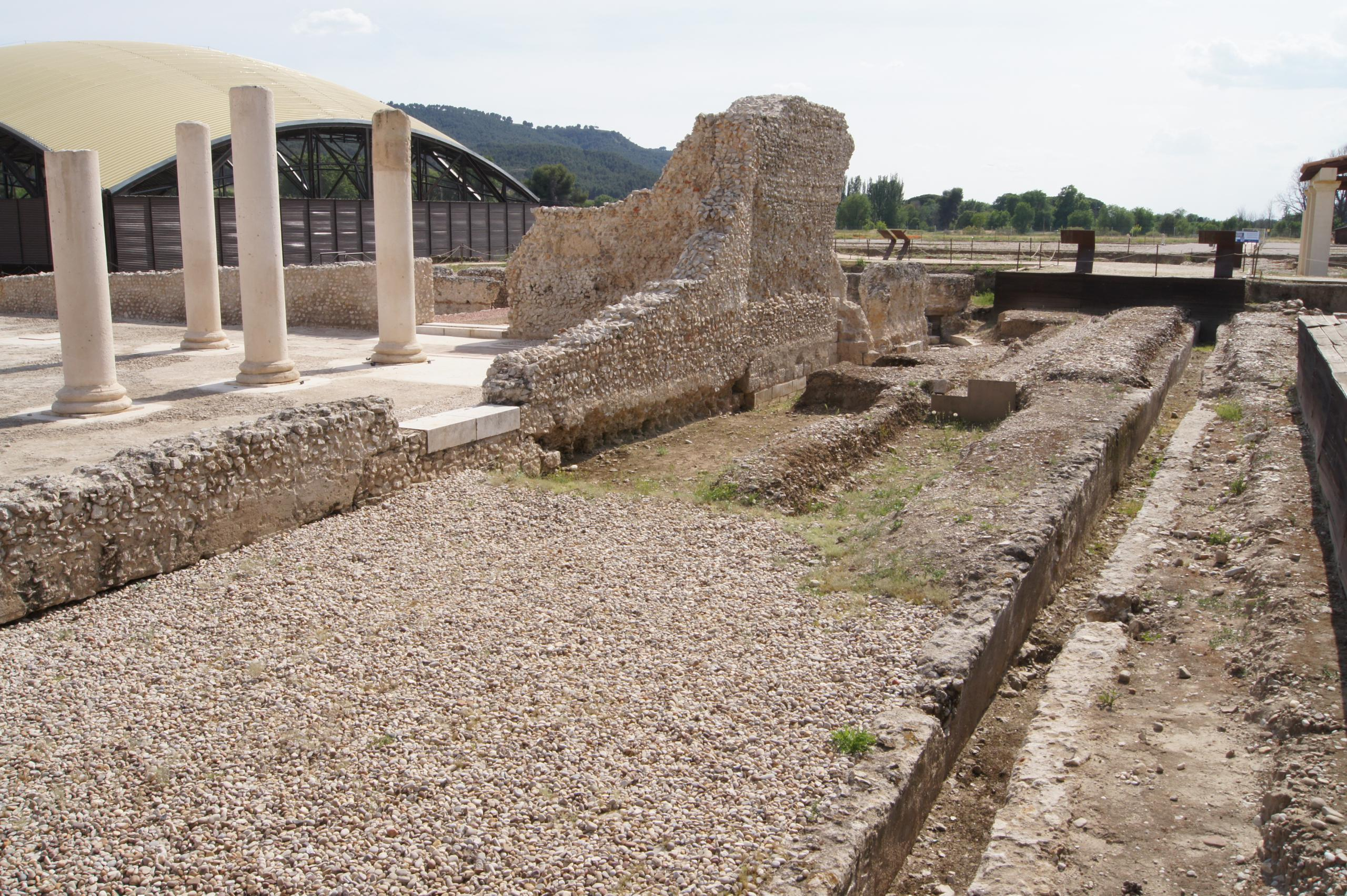
Entrance to basilica

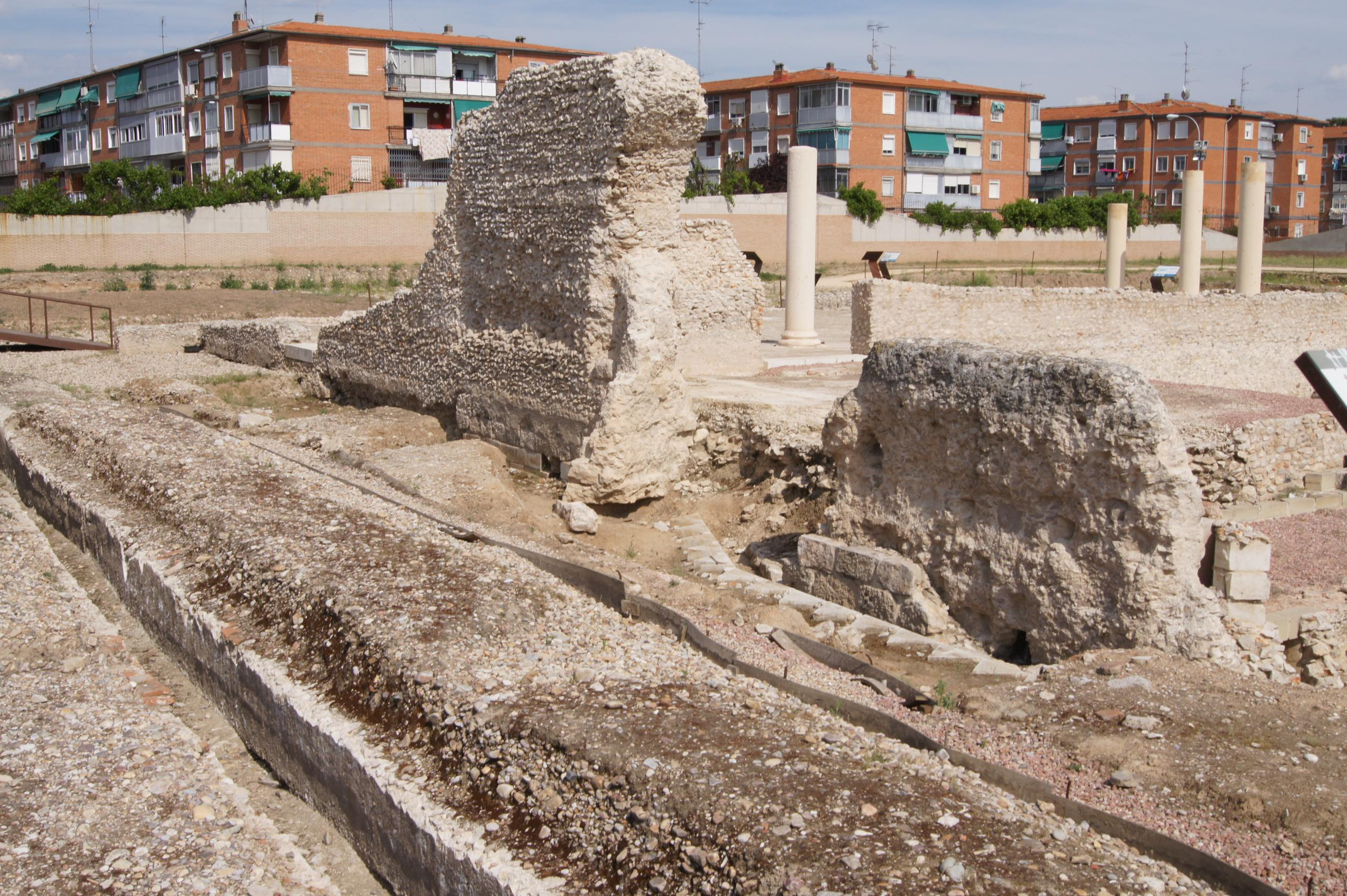
Entrance to curia

The limits of the city are known since archaeological surveys were carried out when the adjoining buildings were built. As in almost all the cities that were founded or rebuilt from the first century BC, the Romans used a Greek-inspired Hippodamian orthogonal grid of streets.

Complutum was built in two main sections: an older one to the east, built in the 20–30s AD, where the insulae are rectangular, approximately 32 × 42 m, and another to the west, from the 60s AD, with square insulae of 32 × 32 m.

15 decumani and 16 cardines were traced, occupying an approximate area of 48 hectares that housed 10,000 to 15,000 inhabitants in its heyday before the crisis of the 3rd century. The two main avenues, the cardo maximus and the decumanus maximus, intersected at the forum with the commercial areas, the main public and religious buildings, and the houses of the most important citizens.

The decumanus maximus is the most important street, because it was the road from Emerita Augusta (Mérida) and Toletum (Toledo) to CaesarAugusta (Zaragoza). Beside the road at the western gate was a fountain where nymphs and the goddess Diana were venerated, known today as Fuente del Juncal. At the southern end of the cardo maximus, on the banks of the Henares, another spring performed a similar function, the so-called de la Salud, in what was then a small river port.

=== Forum complex ===
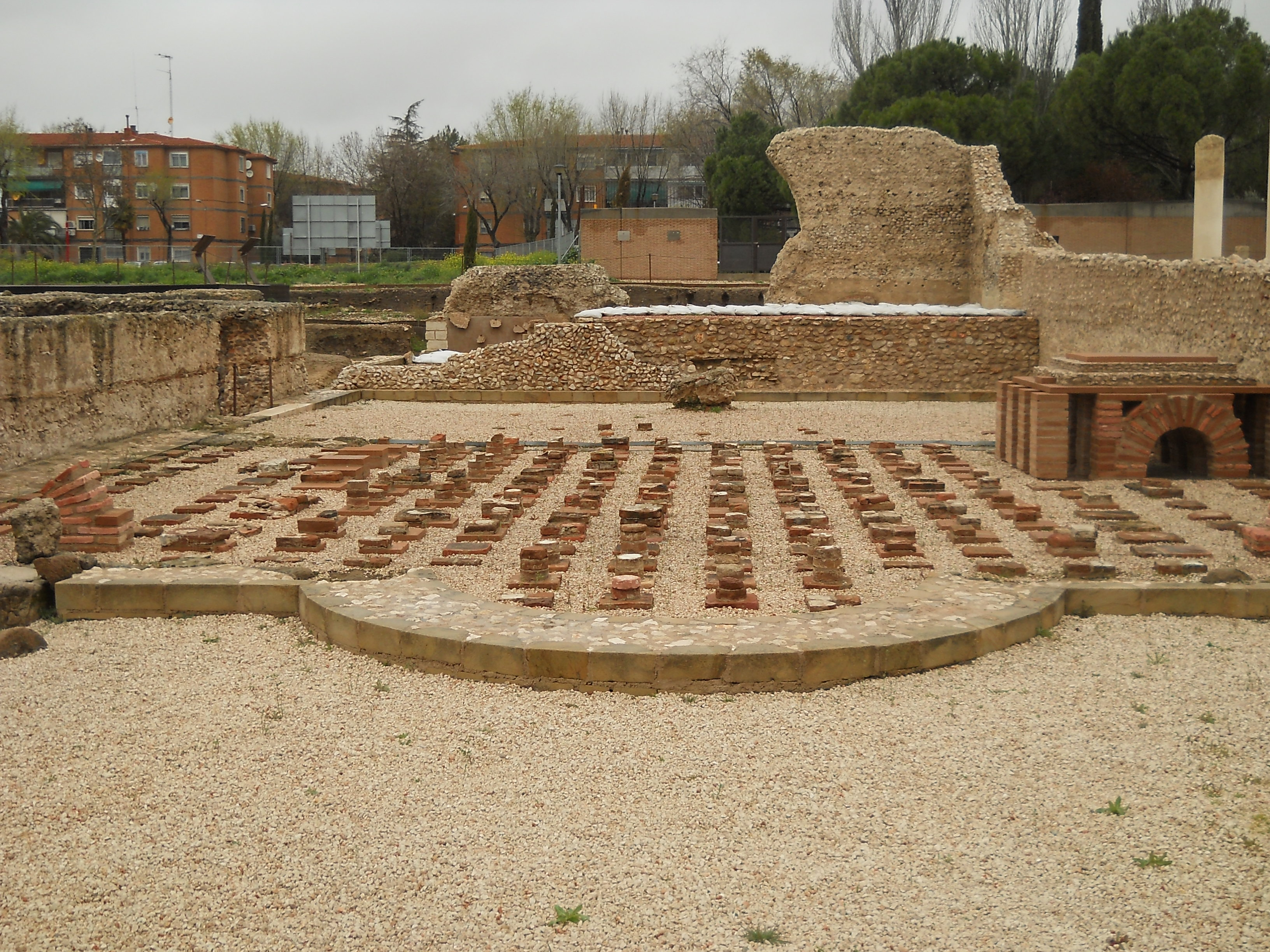
North baths caldarium and later curia

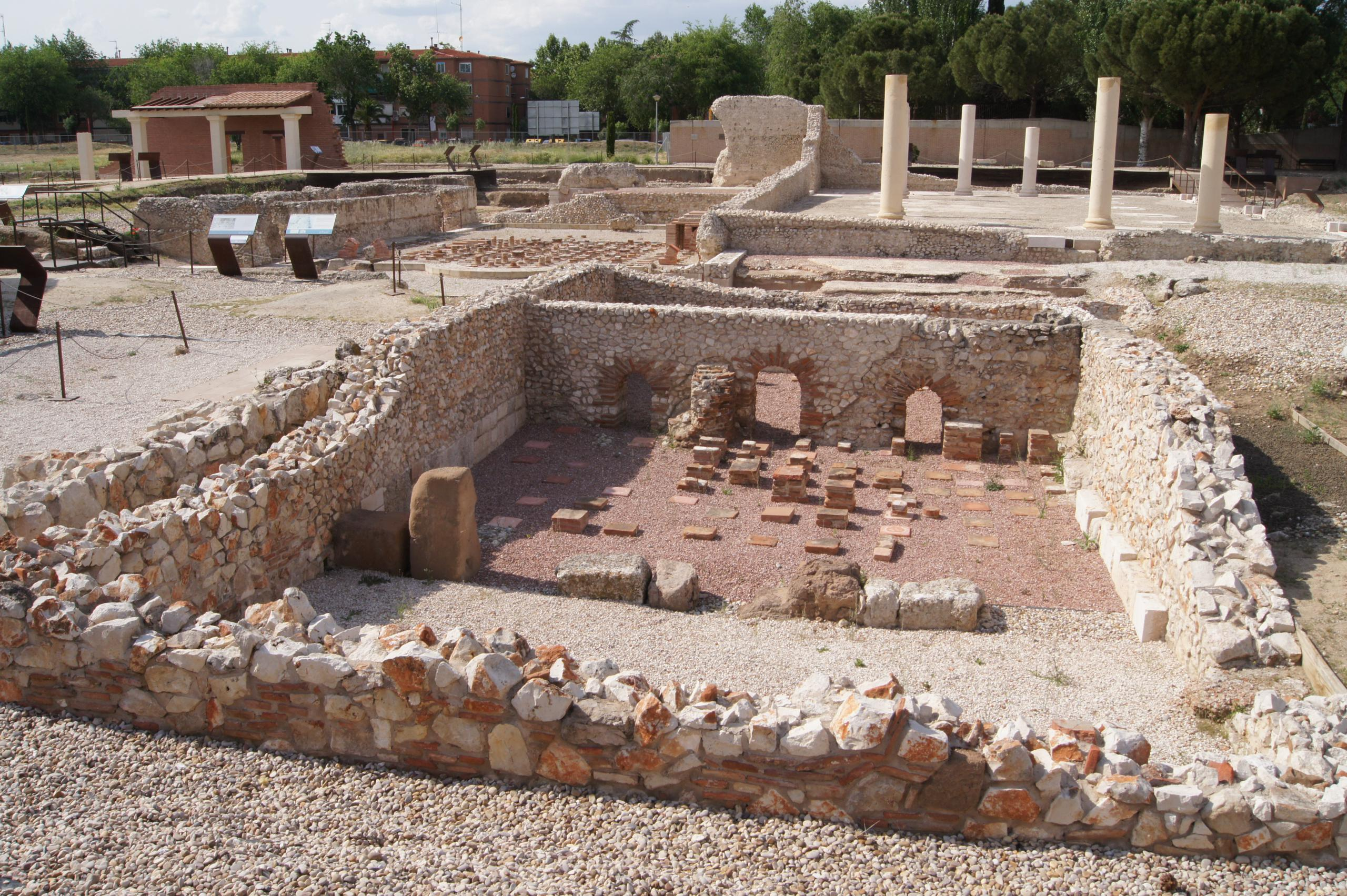
Southern baths tepidarium

The monumental forum complex of the 3rd century included a basilica, a curia, baths and two porticos with numerous shops (tabernae). It was built over an earlier forum and buildings from the 1st century.

A monumental façade adorned the forum, a high stone wall with large columns imitating the stage fronts of a theatre, covered in marble, topped with sculptures, and in the central opening a poetic inscription, a Carmen Epigraphicum (based on Virgil's Aeneid) that commemorated the renovation of the forum at the end of the 3rd century. The cryptoporticus was built to raise the floor and provide a more impressive facade and monumental entrance to the curia. To build this it was also necessary to demolish the east wing of the quadriporticus which until then had stood beside the baths. It stands above an aqueduct that supplied the north baths and therefore lost its original function.

The basilica was one of the most important places in the city as courts of justice and office of commercial agreements. It was built in the 3rd century over an earlier basilica and the north baths. The building had a central nave with a surrounding corridor, separated by a row of columns.

The north baths of the 1st century were attached to the early basilica. The caldarium consisted of a large heated room with opus signinum floor over a hypocaust whose heat was produced in a praefurnium of two large ovens located to the south. An apse on the south side included a hot water pool above which windows made the most of the sun. At the end of the 3rd century the baths were transformed into the curia, the meeting place of the senate. The hypocaust heating system was preserved to serve the senate members.

The curia was where the Paredón del Milagro (miracle wall) was situated, an object of Christian worship throughout the centuries, since tradition places the martyrdom of Saints Justus and Pastor on this wall, although it was probably here that the sentence was passed but was executed in the Campo Laudable just outside Complutum.

The southern baths were built at this time to replace the north baths. They were smaller than the earlier baths but, to maximise their size, the Decumanus IV was built over. Their layout was of a simpler linear provincial type with a succession of four heated environments: first, facing north, the apodyterium (changing room), second the frigidarium with a cold pool, then the tepidarium and finally the caldarium to make the most of the sun. The heated hypocaust with praefurnium remains in place for the last two rooms.

=== Auguraculum ===
Located next to the forum, the auguraculum is an unusual public building: the collegium of the augurs (the priests who celebrate the rituals of divination and other purifying offerings), regulating religious lives of citizens and public activity.

The main hall had two offering wells and six small sacrifice reservoirs, each containing a ceramic jug and remains of one or more sacrificial animals (mostly chicken). In another room, another reservoir with a buried child was found and remains of weighing instruments and a statuette of Mercury, messenger of the gods and god of commerce.

=== House of Griffins ===
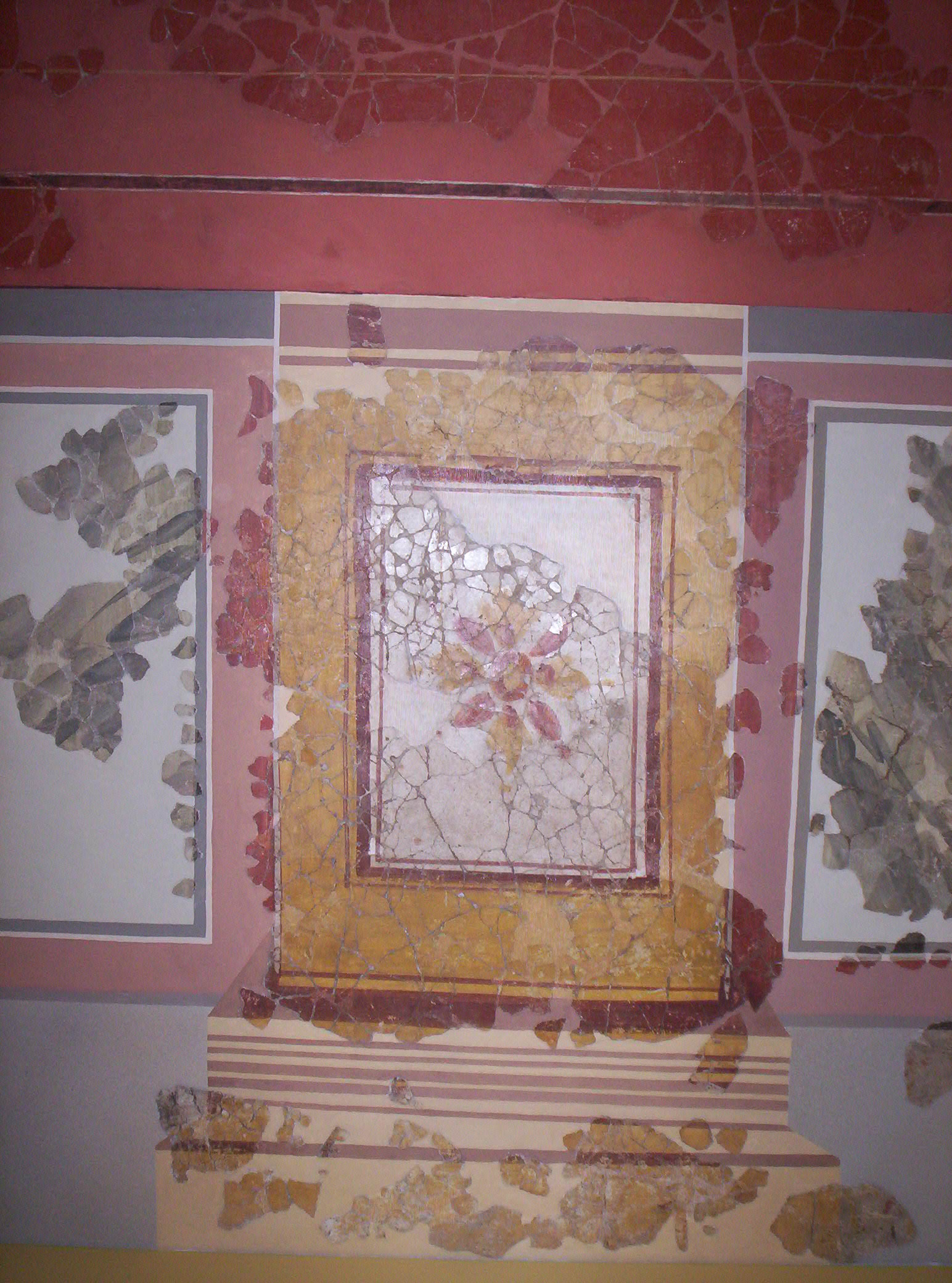
Fresco of room E, House of the Griffins

In the centre of the city is the House of the Griffins, built in the middle of the 1st century and in use until the 4th century, when it was destroyed by an accidental fire. It was one of the best domus in the city, with unusual comforts (a fireplace in room F and a water storage and distribution system). It had a large area (900 m²), with a large inner courtyard (99 m²) surrounded by a peristyle with twelve columns (two of them double) leading to a series of rooms. Wall paintings of all kinds have been found in them, among which some well-preserved ones stand out. Those on the west wall of room E, the tablinum of 48.6 m², the guests and clients reception room, are of the second Pompeian style, in fashion during Hadrian's time (117-138). They represent a simulated architecture of 7.6 × 4.9 m with two Ionic columns on a plinth that imitates marble panels, among which an elaborate yellow plinth supporting a framed flower in its centre stands out.

Other frescos include panels with plants or candelabra, kraters, fountains, clipei, situlas, and cornucopias. In "room D" there is a floating human figure; in the south corridor a horseman in a hunting scene; and in room J a sun god, a triumphant swan (Jupiter metamorphosis), a naturalistic bird and the griffins that give the house its name. In the peristyle, wooden latticework and metal gates are imitated.

=== House of Hippolytus ===
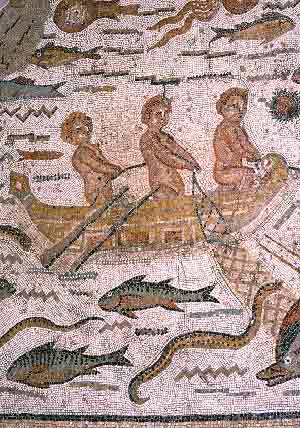
Mosaic in the House of Hippolytus

Although known as the House of Hippolytus, it was in fact the headquarters of the Youth College and all the rooms were related to leisure. The largest room has a large mosaic with a fishing scene. The work is signed by Hippolytus, a master mosaicist of possibly North African origin (present-day Tunisia is the most feasible place) and was made for one of the most important families in the city.

=== Other buildings ===
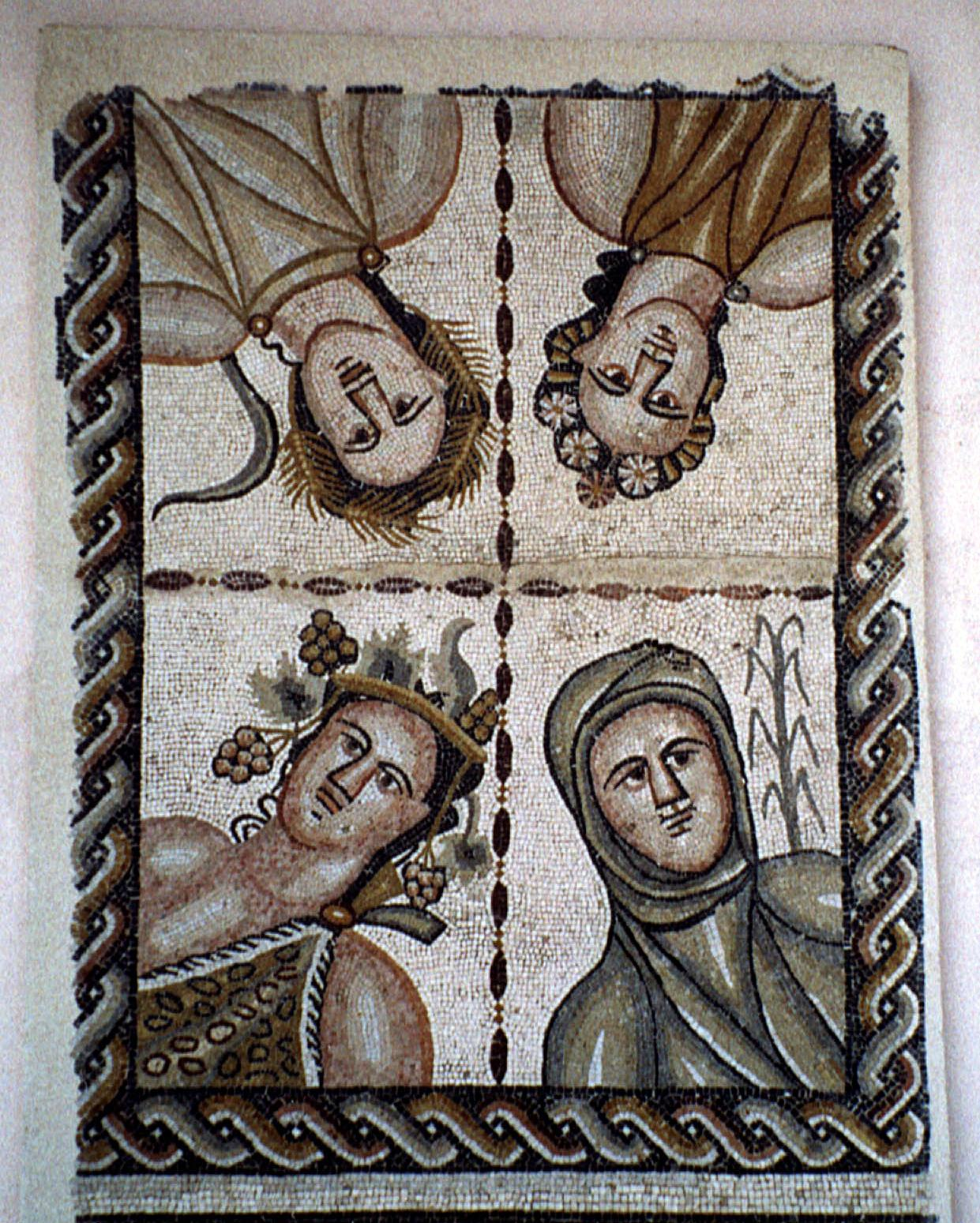
Mosaic of the Four Seasons from the House of Bacchus; anticlockwise from top right: Spring, Summer, Autumn and Winter

Other buildings stand out for their wealth of mosaics, such as that of the four seasons from the House of Bacchus, House of Cupids and House of Leda. The House of Mars is an atrium house built for a family unit. The atrium was without columns and the impluvium in the centre collected rainwater and around it were situated all the rooms.

== Villa of El Val ==
5 km to the east, in the village of El Val, was found a Roman villa. It is a large palatial complex with agricultural parts whose main use was breeding horses for chariot races (auriga). Themes related to chariot races were repeated in the ornamentation of its main buildings, both in mural painting and in mosaics. A large mosaic stands out in particular, "The Victorious Charioteer", which occupied the large reception room of which some 90 m² have been recovered and restored. The mosaic is dated between late 3rd century to early 4th century AD. Its design is made up of a peripheral geometric design and a central emblem in which a charioteer is represented, with a winning gesture, on a horse-drawn chariot.

The villa was developed in three phases: it was built in the first century AD and it was remodeled during the late 3rd century to early 4th century. When Christianised in the 5th century a basilica and a necropolis were added.

It was discovered in 1970 during work on the site, when a large part of the remains were destroyed. It was situated on the Camino de los Afligidos, a route that coincided with the hypothetical Roman road to Caesaraugusta.

It extended over 500x150m. The palatial residence was arranged around a semicircular peristyle. There was a large reception room and a funerary mausoleum with a cruciform plan. To the north and west, the façades were completed with circular and rectangular towers. In the south were private baths and a basilica. The complex also housed workshops, warehouses and stables.

== Gallery ==
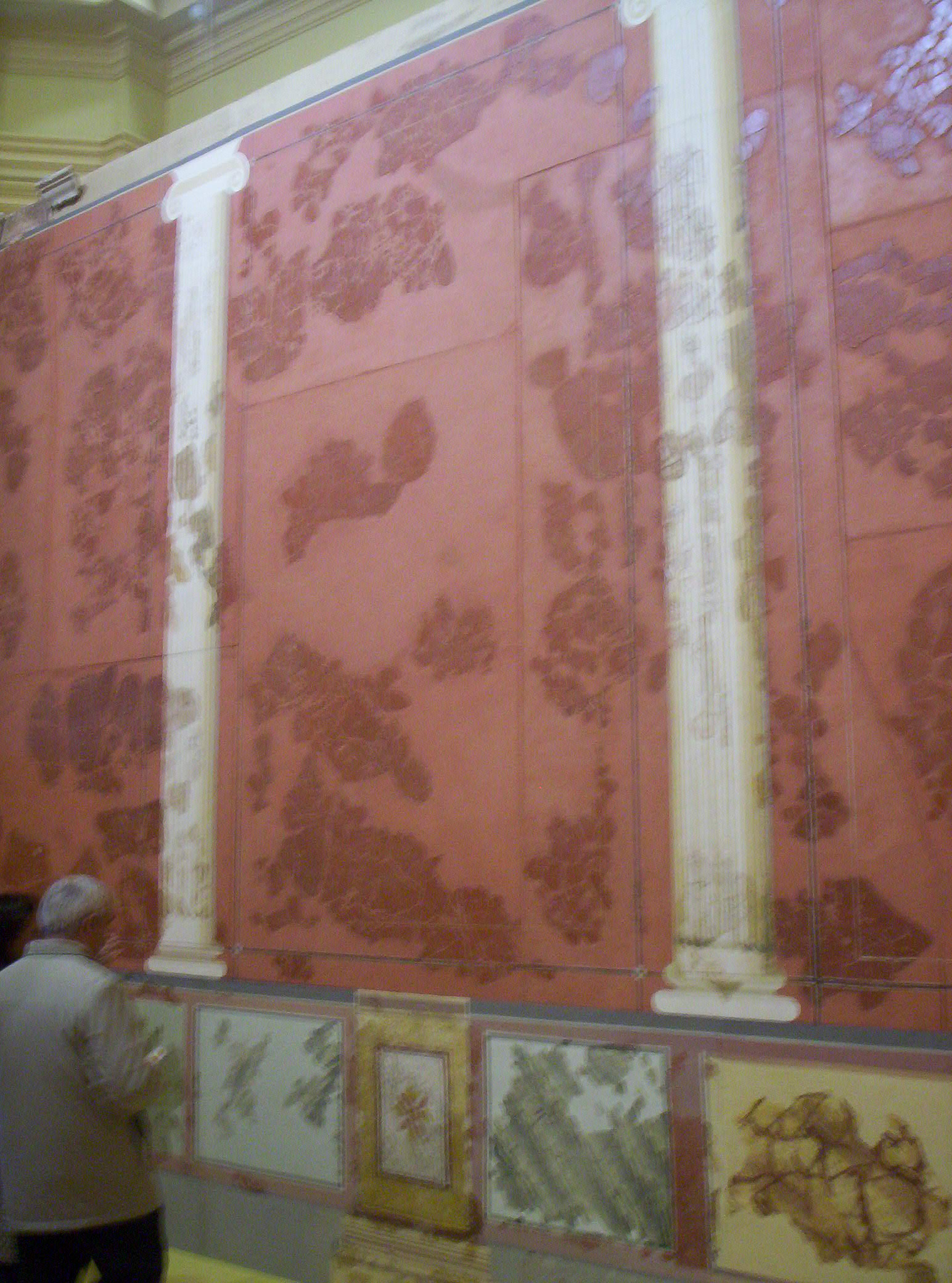
Room E, House of the Griffins

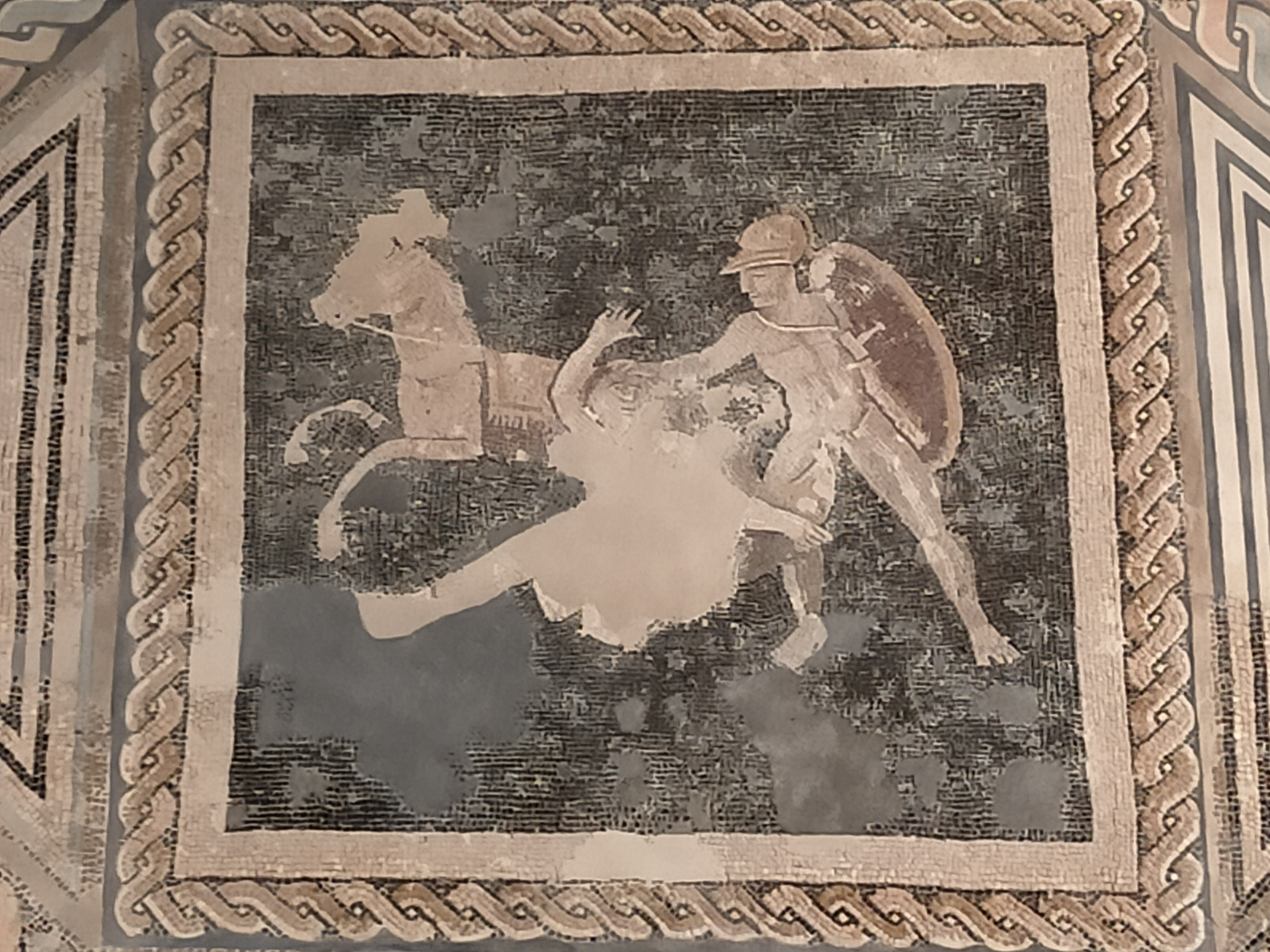

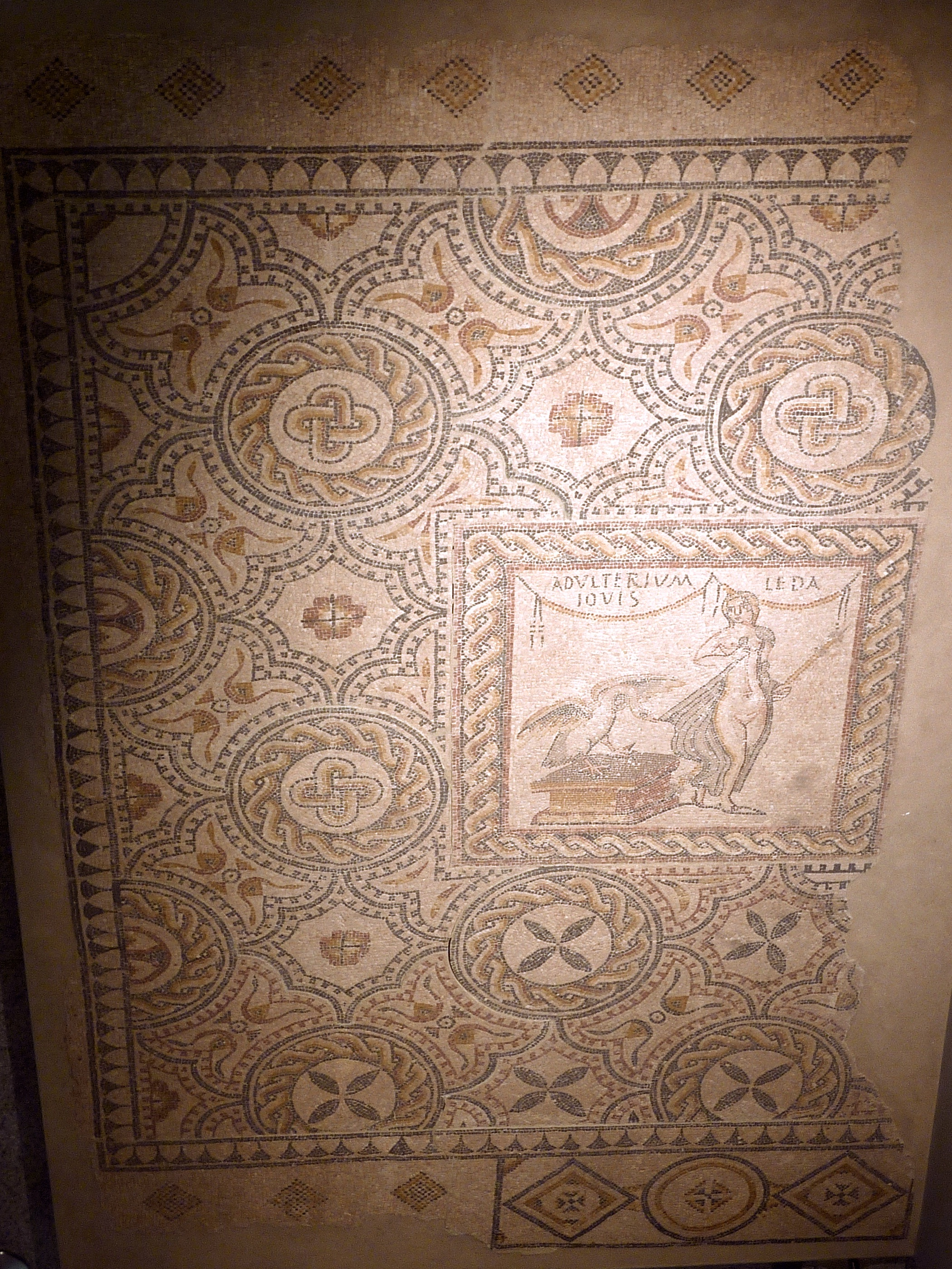
Mosaic of Zeus and Leda

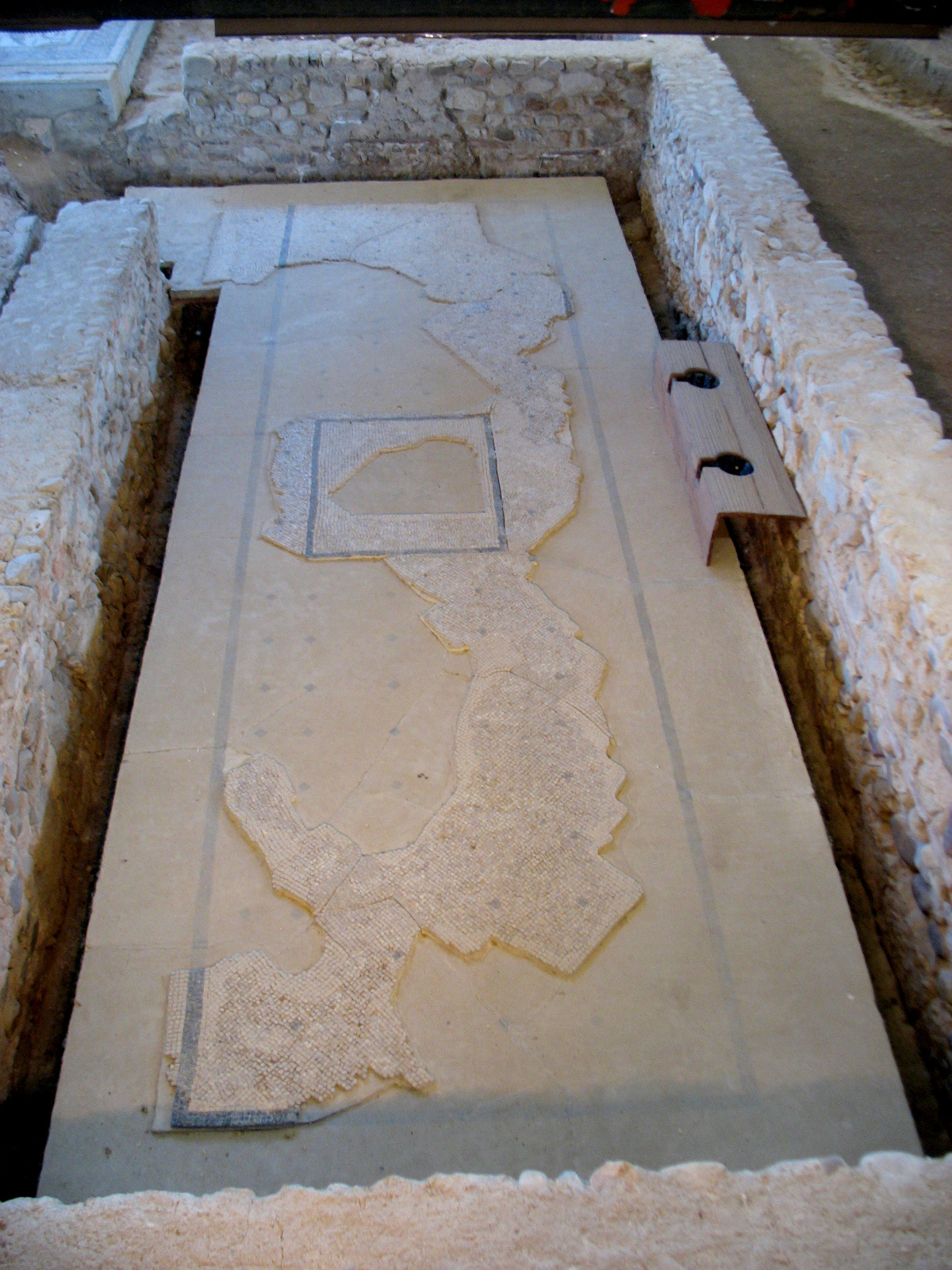
Latrines of House of Hippolytus with mosaic

== See also ==
- Complutense
