= Pancha Pakshi Shastra =

Indian Ancient Literature

Pancha Pakshi Shastra (IAST: Pañca-pakṣi-śāstra, "science of the five birds") is a system of divination historically popular among Hindu astrologers of southern India.

In this system, the nakshatras (lunar mansions) are organized in groups named after five birds: hawk, owl, crow, cock, and peacock. These birds are said to be in one of the following five states depending on the time, the day of the week, and the paksha (fortnight): ruling, eating, walking, sleeping, and dying (in order of most auspicious to least auspicious). Based on these states and the birth nakshatra of a person, the Pancha Pakshi Shastra determines the auspicious and inauspicious times for various activities.

A Sanskrit-language work on Pancha Pakshi Shastra is ascribed to the legendary sage Agastya. Its manuscripts, in Telugu and Grantha scripts, are available at the Thanjavur Palace library. A critical edition of the text, by Shivarama Pati, was published in 1906 under the title Pañca-pakṣi-praśna. Tamil language versions of this text also exist. For example, the Government Oriental Manuscripts Library (GOML) in Chennai has a manuscript titled Ahattiyar-pañca-pakṣi-sūttira.

Other historical texts on the topic include Pañca-pakṣi or Pakṣi-jyotiṣa of Krishna (Kṛṣṇa), Pañca-pakṣi-prakaśa of Gangadhara, and Pañca-pakṣi-śakunāvalī of Narayana Bhatta.
