= Mount Bibele =

Italian mountain in the Apennines

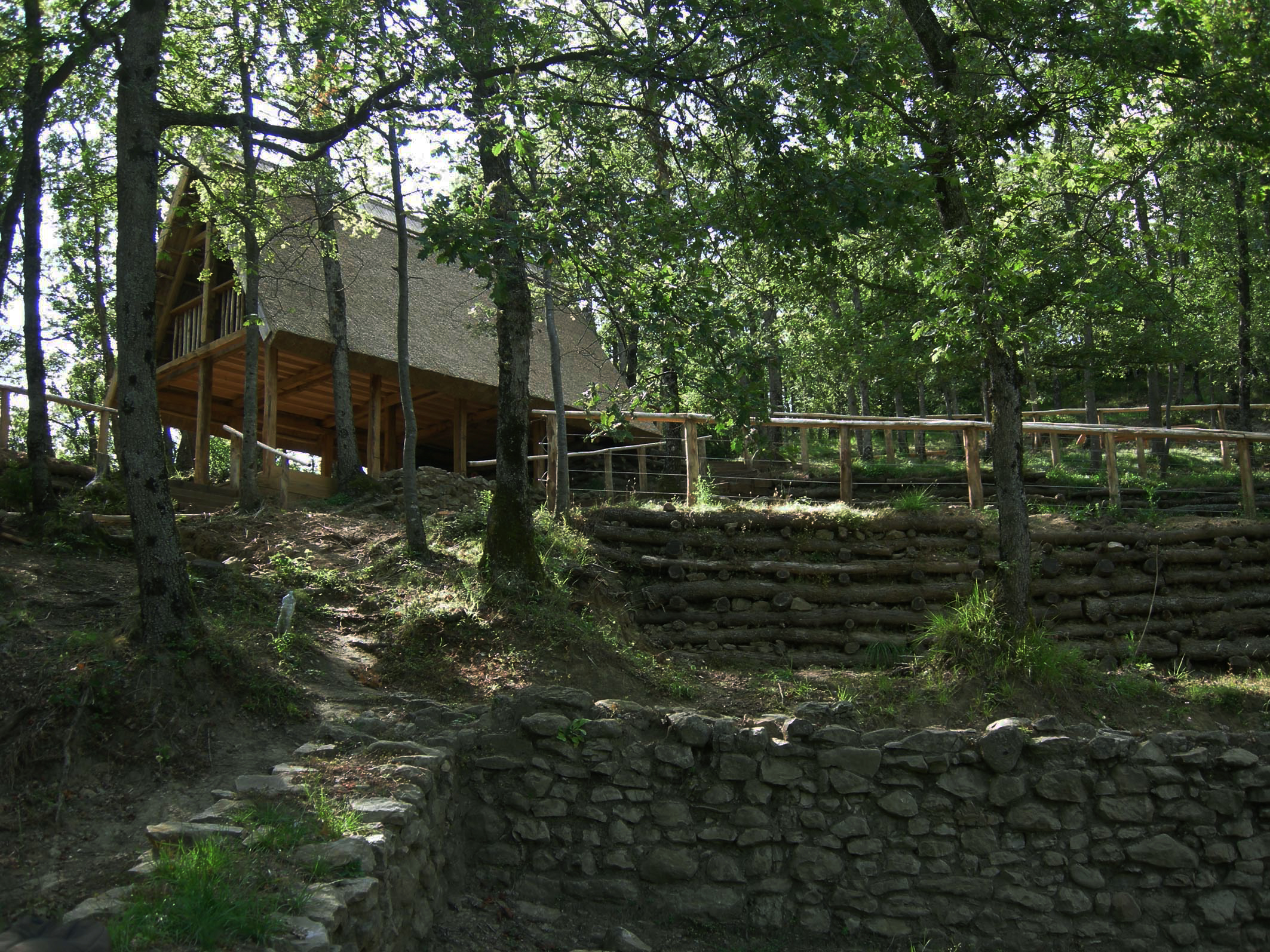
- House at Mount Bibele

Highest point
- Elevation: 617 m (2,024 ft)
- Coordinates: 44°16′14″N 11°22′22″E

Naming
- Etymology: Likely derives from the Latin word Bibo, which means to drink
- Language of name: Italian

Geography
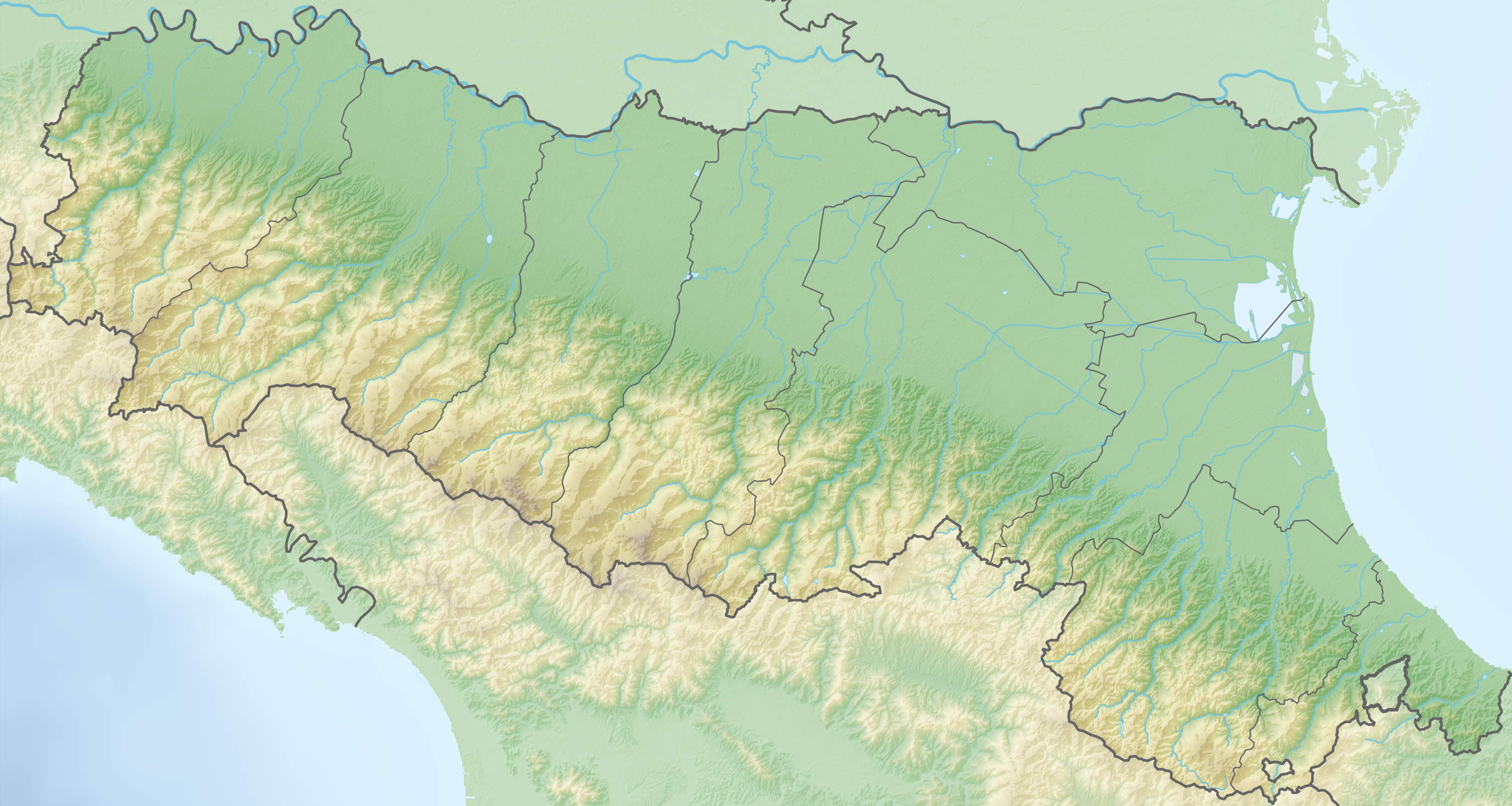
- Location within Emilia-Romagna
- Country: Italy
- Region: Emilia-Romagna
- Parent range: Apennines

Mount Bibele is a large mountain in the Apennine mountains which acts as a divide between the drainage basins of the Idice river to the east and the Zena river to the west. Its highest point is 617 m (2,024 ft) above sea level. The mountain is located in the commune of Monterenzio.

== Etymology ==
The toponym Bibele likely derives from the Latin verb bibo which means to drink. Medieval documents describe a mountain with the name Monte Bibulo.

== Geography ==
The mountain is made of sandstones, biocalcarenite, and marls from the Miocene epoch of the Neogene geologic period. The mountain has three peaks. Mount Bibele is the highest and is 617 metres (2,024 ft) high. It is the origin of the name of the mountain. The other peaks are Mount Tamburino, which is 575 m high, and Mount Savino, which is 550 m high.

== History ==
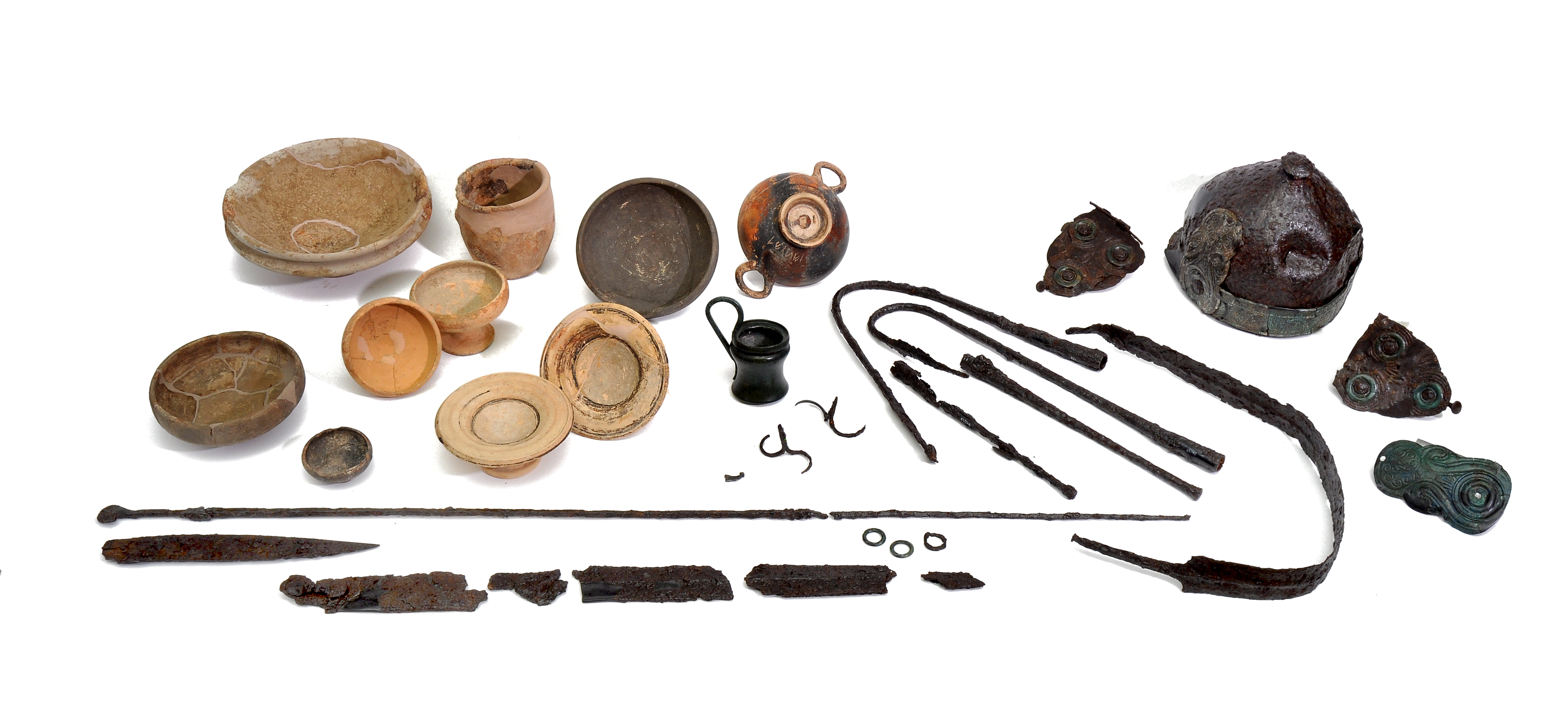
Artifacts from a tomb found at Mount Bibele

This region was likely settled by humans due to its naturally fortified position that allows for a view of the Raticosa pass and access to the Po valley. This provided an economic benefit as it was on a trade route between the Etruscan civilization and central Italy.

Archaeological evidence has revealed that it was inhabited as early as the European Copper Age. A necropolis on the site was used by the La Tène culture, the Etruscan civilization, and the Celts. The oldest tombs in the cemetery date from 450 to 350 BCE and likely belong to the Etruscan civilization. Tombs dating back to the later parts of the 4th century BCE have Celtic artifacts. The necropolis is the largest Celtic cemetery found in Italy. There are 171 tombs including 123 inhumations and 38 cremations. Excavations at the cemetery began in 1980. Numerous ceramics and bronze statuettes have also been found.
