= Sacra (ancient Rome) =

In ancient Roman religion, sacra (Latin, neuter plural, "sacred [matters]") were transactions relating to the worship of the gods, especially sacrifice and prayer. They are either sacra privata or publica. The former were undertaken on behalf of the individual by himself, on behalf of the family by the pater familias, or on behalf of the gens by the whole body of the people.

== Sacra privata ==
Sacra privata were attached to particular families; these passed to the heir with the succession, and thereafter became a burden—hence, an inheritance without sacra (hereditas sine sacris) proverbially signified an unimpaired piece of good fortune. If a patrician wished to become a plebeian, he had to renounce his familial sacra, his gens and his curia. As the family had sacra, so also had the gens, which had arisen out of the family by expansion. These were performed by a sacrificial priest (flamen) appointed from among the gentiles, the celebration taking place in his own house or in a special sacellum in the presence of the assembled gentiles.

The centre of the domestic service of the gods was formed by the worship of the Penates and Lares. In some particular cases, recourse was also had to specific deities, as appropriate for the occasion at hand. Besides this, an individual might perform sacra at any time and whenever they thought it necessary; but if he vowed such sacra before the pontiffs and wished that they should be continued after his death, his heirs inherited with his property the obligation to perform them, and the pontiffs had to watch that they were performed duly and at their proper time. Though sacra could take place at any time, the devout Roman typically prayed and made sacrifice at mealtimes, most usually between dinner and dessert. When possible, a pig was sacrificed. Proper ceremonies accompanied all family occasions from birth to death, even when the gods were no longer popular; if sacra were not performed, it was believed, the gods would become displeased with the pater familias. In turn, the deities' supposed underworld relatives, the malicious and vagrant lemures, might be placated with midnight offerings of black beans and spring water.

For home sacrifices, citizens would usually use foods—such as wine, cheese, fruits, milk, honey cakes, honeycombs, or grapes—instead of animals, as the former were less messy. However, many families would use small animals for their blood-sacrifices. A common thread running through the aforementioned sacrificial options seems to be that each represented life, more or less literally. Families would also use incense, fire, or wreaths, if a more permanent sacrifice was desired; if it was thought that their ancestors had become angry, they would be placated with an offering of black beans and spring water at midnight.

Within the domicile, Lares—minor guardian deities—were usually housed in a shrine, along with the Penates and favorite gods or goddesses; the household Lar would often be set upon the table during meals, as well. In the homes of the lower classes, the shrines were set in wall-niches with a basic painted background, whereas the upper classes built their shrines in the servants' quarters; this was supposed to keep the focus upon piety, rather than public spectacle.

== Sacra publica ==
The sacra publica were undertaken pro populo (collectively) by: (1) the curia, pagi, or vici—i.e., various subdivisions of the Roman community, whence such sacrifices were called sacra popularia; or (2) the individual gentes and societies, i.e., the sodalitas, to which the superintendence of a particular cult had been committed by the State; or (3) the magistrates and priests of the Roman State. The sacra of the gentes were, with few exceptions, performed in public, though the multitude present remained silent spectators; only in a few cases would they take part in the procession to the place of worship, or in the sacrificial feast.

The public religious practices of ancient Rome served multiple purposes, due to the nature of its religion; religion and the affairs of the state were closely intertwined, so that the state religion was a mode of political power. Religious rituals and festivals were often held in order to calm and distract the people. This can be seen through the establishment of the Ludi Apollinares around the time of the Second Punic War. These public affairs were meant to honor the gods, and consisted of either sporting competitions (e.g. the Apollinares), or religious rituals. When these rituals involved sacrifice, they were controlled by the Emperor and the elites

The correct practice of ritual—orthopraxis—was essential to currying favor with the gods. Public ceremonies were presided over by some sort of authority from the higher social class; or, in some rare cases, specifically women therefrom. The presider would begin the ceremony at the start of the day, and bathe himself or herself thoroughly beforehand. Any civilians in attendance would wear togas with a hood over their heads, while the presider was bareheaded—often with a laurel wreath on his head for distinction. In live sacrifices, only domestic animals were used. These animals were cleaned, and often decorated with ribbons or garlands, with colors dependent on the god or goddess for whom they were intended. The Romans would also use fruit and grains in public ceremonies, as well as libations or drinks. These inanimate sacrifices were not less significant than live animal sacrifices; rather, they all served different purposes and went to different deities.
