= Res divina =

Ancient Roman legal concept

In ancient Rome, res divinae, singular res divina (Latin for "divine matters," that is, the service of the gods), were the laws that pertained to the religious duties of the state and its officials. Roman law was divided into the res divina and res publica, the divine and public or political spheres, the latter phrase being the origin of the English word "republic." Res divina also means, as a technical term, ritual sacrifice.

In the Roman system of belief, religio was the acknowledgement of superiors through honores (honours). Caelestes honores ("heavenly honours") were offered to the gods, and very occasionally to mortals whose actions had earned great benefits for mankind. Earthly hierarchies reflected the celestial order.

Cicero, who was both a senator and augur, investigates the nature of res divinae and res humanae (human affairs) in his treatise De Natura Deorum ("On the nature of the gods"). He makes no attempt to develop an internally consistent system in which the rituals of res divinae might be modified by “higher truths” of doctrine or revelation. He concludes that even if the nature and existence of the gods cannot be proved beyond doubt, it is wise and pragmatic to honour them by piously offering the time-hallowed rites. Rome's continued success might depend on it. Cicero's reasoning offers a stark contrast to later Judaeo-Christian definitions of religion as spiritual and godly in contrast — or opposition — to those things regarded as material and temporal.

Res divina is an example of ancient Roman religious terminology that was taken over and redefined for Christian purposes, in this case by Augustine. In Augustinian usage, res divina is a "divine reality" as represented by a sacrum signum ("sacred sign") such as a sacrament.

== The Res Divinae of Varro ==
The multivolume Antiquitates rerum humanarum et divinarum was one of the chief works of Varro (1st century BC), who was the major source on traditional Roman religion for the Church Fathers. It was a particular target of polemic for Augustine, who incidentally preserves much of what is known about its content and structure. Varro devoted 25 books of the Antiquitates to res humanae ("human affairs") and 16 to res divinae. His emphasis is deliberate; he treats cult and ritual as human constructs, and divides res divinae into three kinds:

- the mythic theology of the poets, or narrative elaboration;
- the natural theology of the philosophers, or theorizing on divinity (an elite activity to which ordinary people should not be exposed, lest they come to doubt the sacredness of social and religious institutions);
- the civil theology concerned with the relation of the state to the divine.

This schema is Stoic in origin, but Varro adapts it to the political and cultural concerns of his time.

== Religious background ==
The heart of Rome’s natural order was the city of Rome, home to the gods of state, their cults and their senior priest-officials, who in the Republic were the ruling consuls. Rome’s most powerful god, Jupiter Optimus Maximus (Jupiter greatest and best) favoured “his” city because his own power and status were constructed by the Roman law, rites and sacrifice which elevated and honoured him. The same principles constructed the various powers and honours of all other gods of the state pantheon. Public cults (sacra publica) were state funded, at least in principle, and most priesthoods occupied by high-ranking citizens.

Archaic Rome was part of a broader civilisation which included Latin, colonial Greek and possibly Carthaginian elements, dominated by the Etruscans - the rites of the haruspex, for example, were almost certainly Etruscan. In its ascendancy from local to Imperial power, Rome pragmatically embraced the local cults of its neighbouring villages and towns, then of city-states and provinces. Local cult became an instrument of Roman administration, run by locally elected official-priests. Their "foreign" gods never became gods of the Roman state as a whole, but were an essential feature of reciprocal relations between Rome and its provinces. In approximately 155 CE, Aelius Aristides would remark that his own favourite gods, Asclepius, Isis and Serapis, were widely revered in the Empire because of the favour shown them by Rome.

== Annotated References ==
- Beard, M., Price, S., North, J., Religions of Rome: Volume 1, a History, illustrated, Cambridge University Press, 1998. ISBN 0-521-31682-0
- Gradel, Ittai. Emperor Worship and Roman Religion, Oxford (Oxford University Press), 2002. ISBN 0-19-815275-2
- Momigliano, Arnaldo, On Pagans, Jews, and Christians, reprint, Wesleyan University Press, 1987. ISBN 0-8195-6218-1
