= Thomas Supis =

German ice hockey player

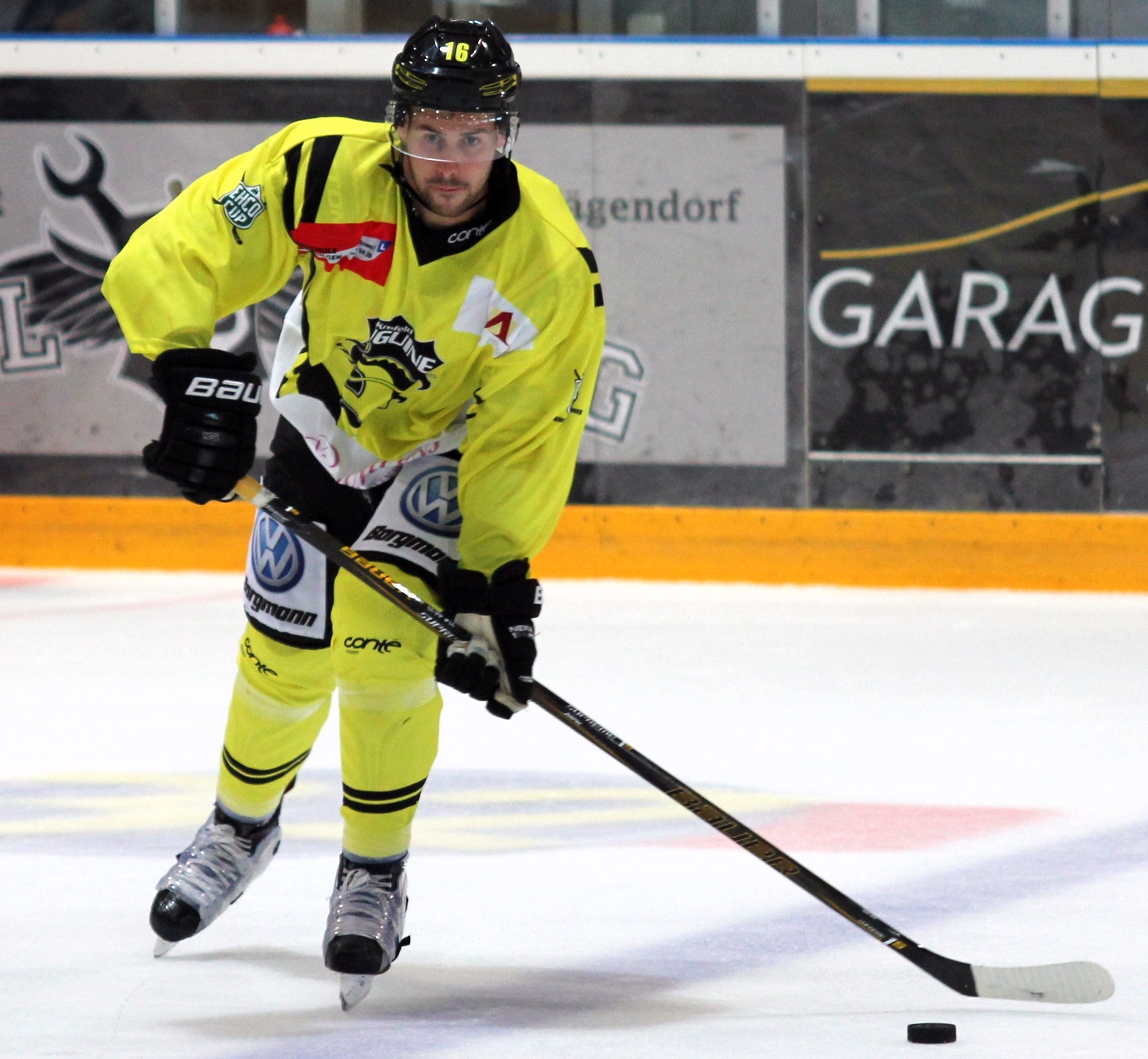
- Born: January 21, 1992 (age 33); Villingen-Schwenningen, GER
- Height: 6 ft 1 in (185 cm)
- Weight: 187 lb (85 kg; 13 st 5 lb)
- Position: Defence
- Shoots: Left
- DEL team Former teams: Free Agent; Eisbären Berlin; Krefeld Pinguine
- Playing career: 2011–present

Thomas Supis (born January 21, 1992, in Villingen-Schwenningen) is a German professional ice hockey player. He is currently an unrestricted free agent who most recently played for the Krefeld Pinguine in the German Ice Hockey League.

He made his DEL debut with the Eisbären Berlin during the 2011–12 season. In his third full season with Krefeld Pinguine in 2016–17 season, he appeared in only 18 games, as the club finished in last position. Supis left the club on March 3, 2017, after it was revealed he would not be offered a new contract.
