= Pictorius =

Pictorius is the Latin for "painter".

It is also a Latinized name used by several authors of the Renaissance era.

- Georg Pictorius
- Josua Maaler
