= Internationales Luftfahrt-Museum =

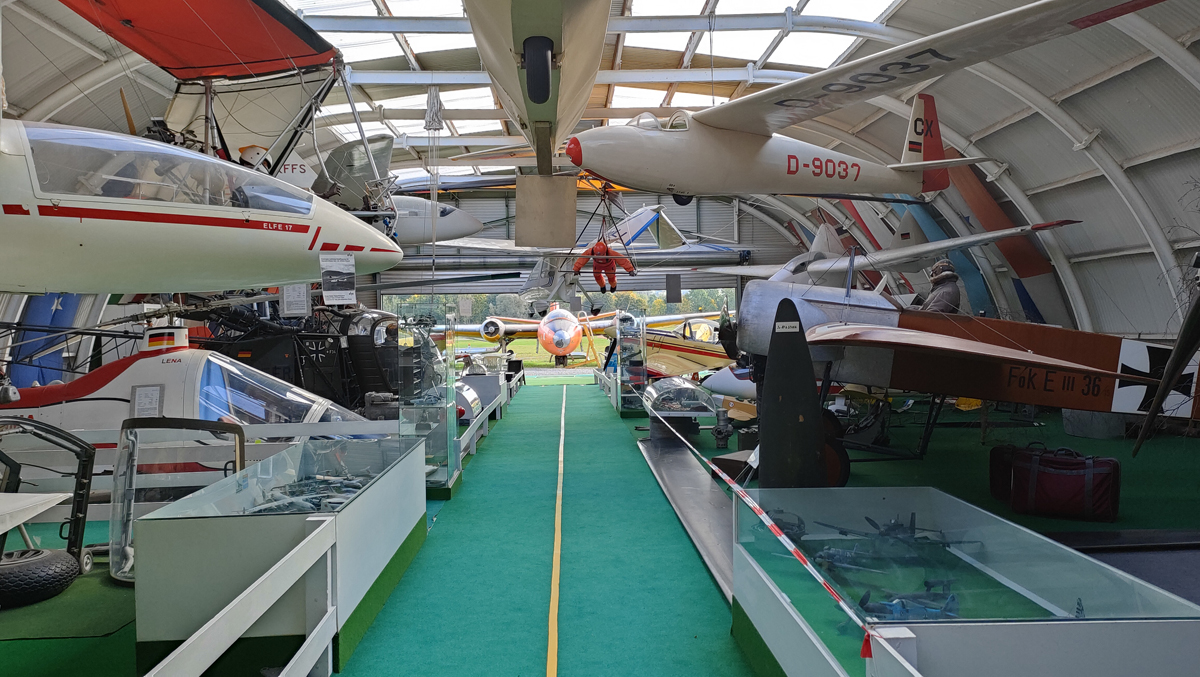
- Established: 28 May 1988
- Location: Villingen-Schwenningen, Baden-Württemberg
- Coordinates: 48.0671°N 8.5696°E
- Type: Aviation museum
- Public transit access: Bushaltestelle (Luftfahrtmuseum) am Museum
- Website: luftfahrtmuseum.pflumm.eu

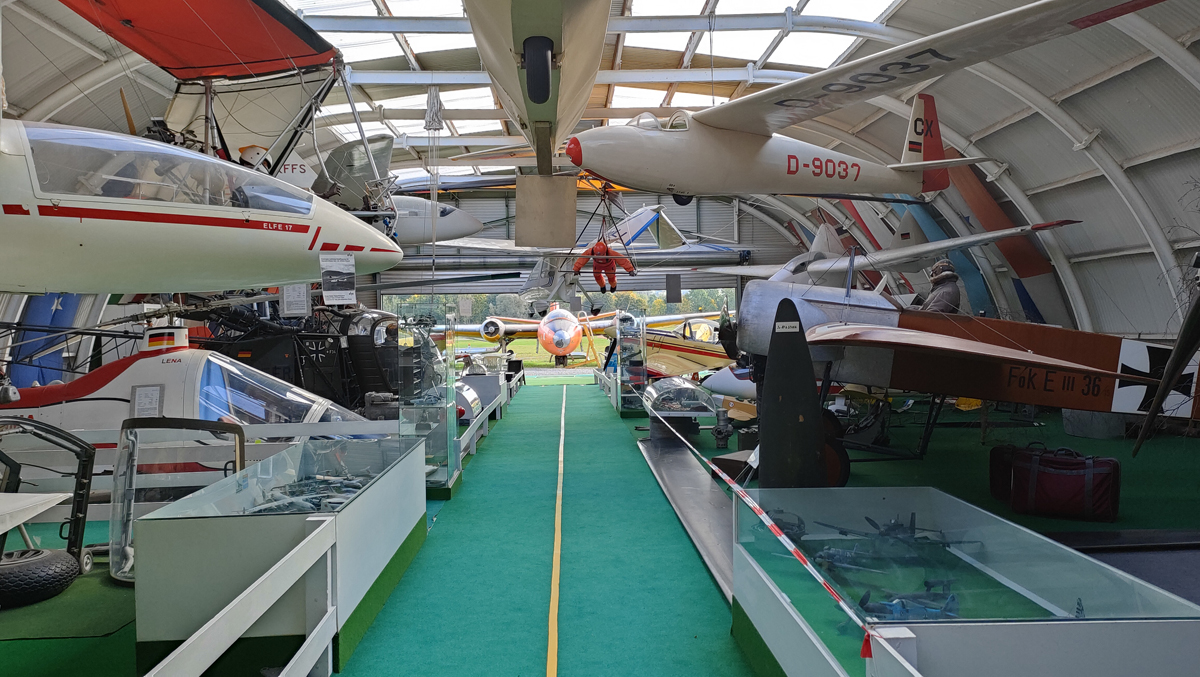

The Internationales Luftfahrt-Museum (Manfred Pflumm) is an aviation museum located in the German town of Villingen-Schwenningen in Baden-Württemberg. Many aerospace exhibits are on display including fixed-wing aircraft, helicopters and aircraft engines. The main display is contained within one hangar with other aircraft displayed externally on a site covering 13,000 square metres. In addition to the aircraft exhibits a number of aircraft components and a collection of ejection seats are also held by the museum.

== Aircraft on display ==
The museum has over 50 aircraft on display and a collection of 350 model aircraft.

=== Piston engine aircraft ===
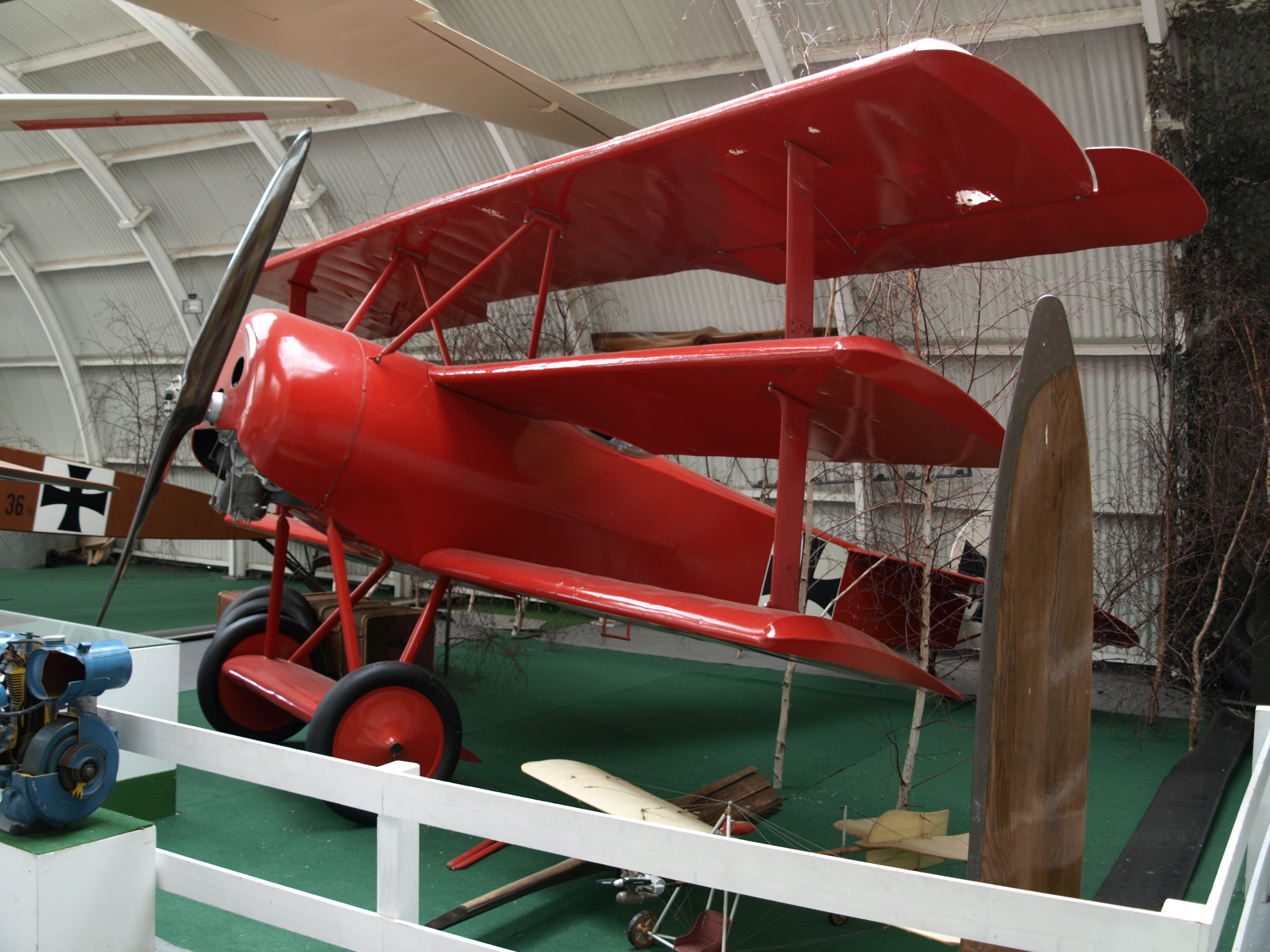
Fokker Dr.1 on display

- Antonov An-2
- Aero L-60 Brigadýr
- Braunschweig LF-1 Zaunkönig
- CP.301S Smaragd
- Dornier Do 27
- Dornier Do 335
- Fischer Brause
- Focke-Wulf FWP-149D
- Fokker E.III
- Fokker Dr.I
- Hirth Acrostar
- Vogt Lo.120S
- Yakovlev Yak-18T
- Zlin Z-37A Cmelak

=== Jet aircraft ===
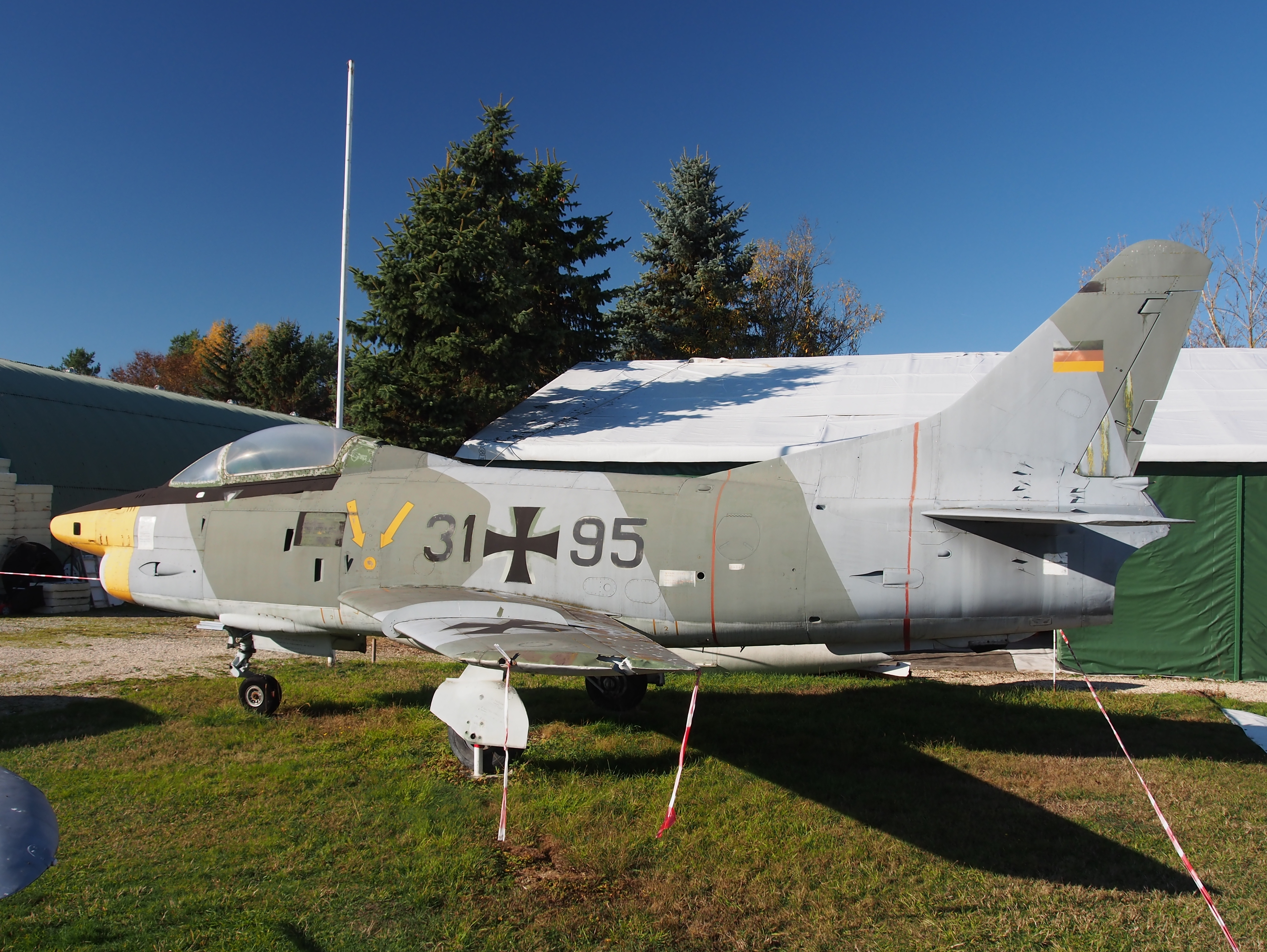
Fiat G.91 aircraft on display

- Armstrong Whitworth Sea Hawk
- Canadair Sabre
- Dassault/Dornier Alpha Jet
- de Havilland Vampire
- English Electric Canberra
- Fiat G.91
- Lockheed T-33
- Lockheed F-104G Starfighter
- Mikoyan-Gurevich MiG-15
- Mikoyan-Gurevich MiG-21

=== Gliders ===
- Akaflieg Stuttgart FS-26 Moseppl motor glider
- DFS SG 38 Schulgleiter
- Fauvel AV.36
- Neukom Elfe
- Raab Doppelraab
- Schneider Grunau Baby
- Schleicher Ka 6

=== Helicopters ===
- Aerospatiale Alouette II
- MBB Bo 105
- Saro Skeeter

== Aircraft engines ==
=== Piston engines ===
- Elizalde Tigre
- Shvetsov ASh-62

=== Gas turbine engines ===
- de Havilland Ghost

== See also ==
- List of aerospace museums
