= Eugene Burnstein =

American social psychologist

- Education: University of Pennsylvania, University of Michigan
- Awards: Guggenheim Fellowship in psychology (1971)
- Scientific career
- Fields: Social psychology
- Institutions: University of Texas, Michigan State University, University of Michigan
- Thesis: Intentional and Incidental Learning as a Function of Selection Processes (1960)
- Doctoral advisor: Robert Zajonc
- Doctoral students: Markus Kemmelmeier

Eugene Burnstein is an American social psychologist and professor emeritus of psychology at the University of Michigan College of Literature, Science, and the Arts. He is also a senior research scientist emeritus at the University of Michigan Institute for Social Research. He is known for his research on the cognitive bases of social influence and group decision-making.
