= Wanne Observation Tower =

Coordinates: 48°03′29″N 8°28′40″E

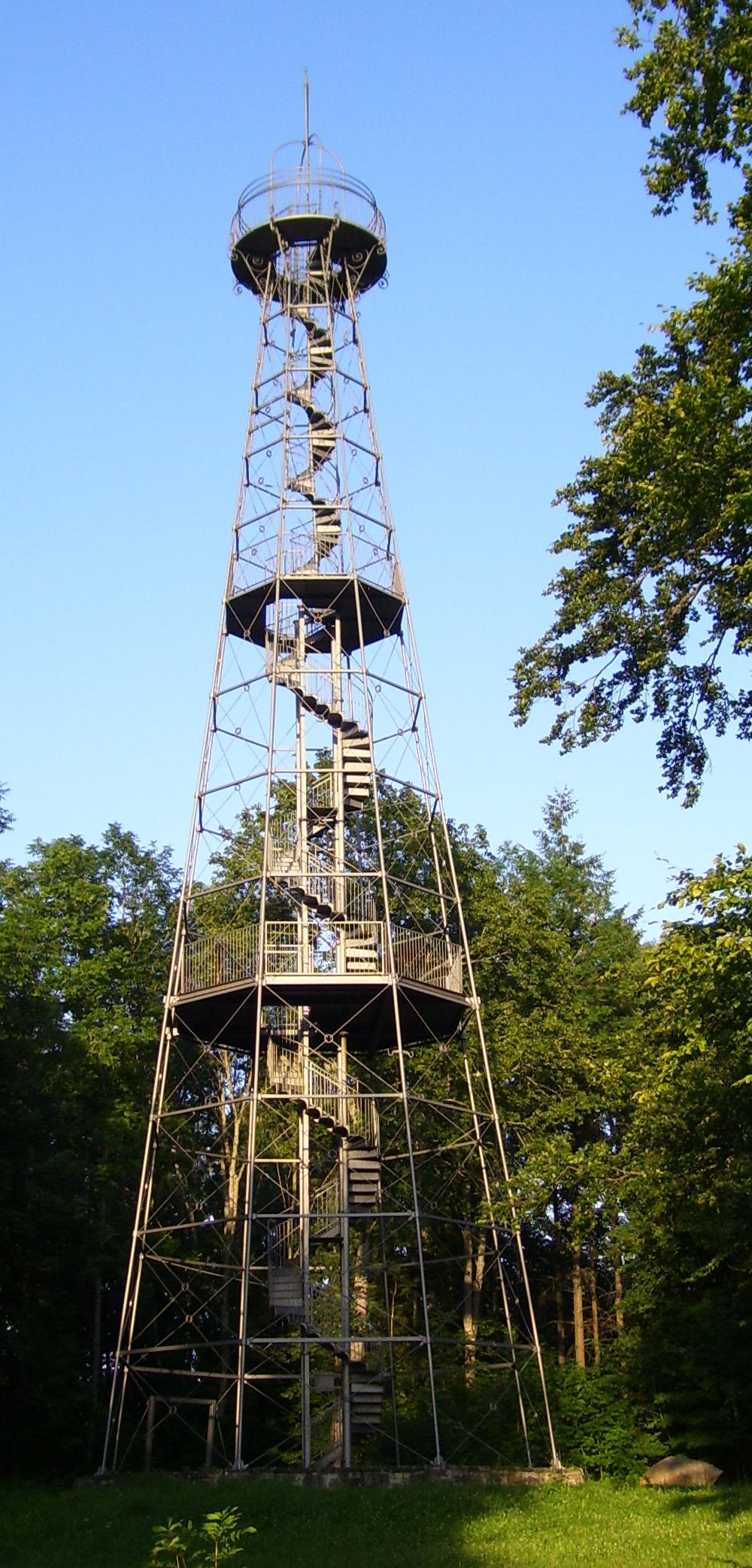
Wanne Observation Tower

Wanne observation tower is one of the oldest lattice towers in the world. It was built in 1888 by the observation tower cooperative on the 778-meter-high (2,552 ft) Wanne mountain tub east of Villingen, in the Schwarzwald-Baar district in southern Baden-Württemberg, Germany. It was erected by bell foundry Grueninger of Villingen. The 30-meter-high (98 ft) tower has three platforms and is remarkable for its uncommon design, as it has an octagonal cross section.

== See also ==
- List of towers
