= Villingen-Schwenningen =

Villingen-Schwenningen Villinge-Schwenninge (Alemannic German)
- Town
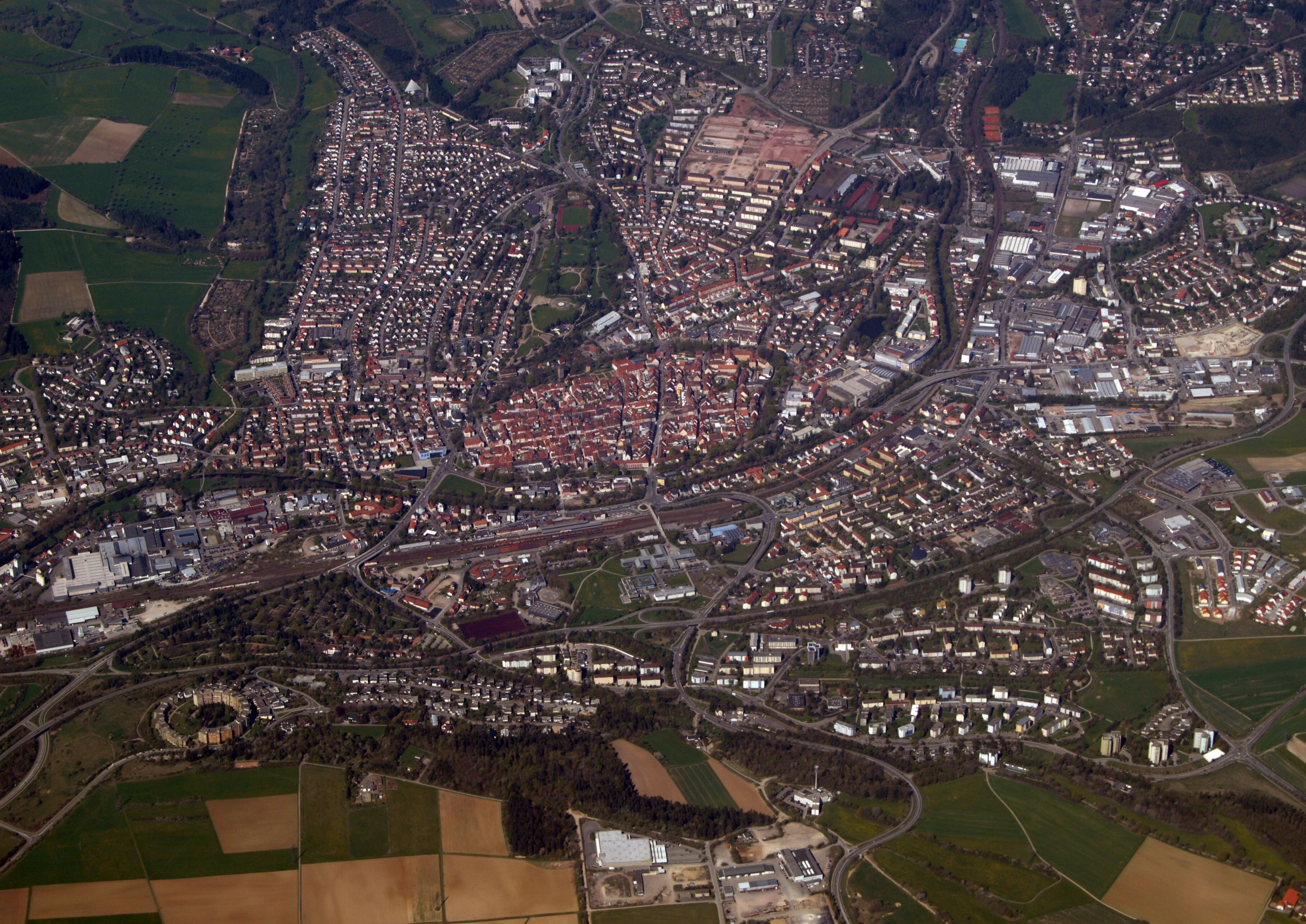
- Aerial view of Villingen from the east

- Coat of arms

- Location of Villingen-Schwenningen within Schwarzwald-Baar-Kreis district
- Interactive map of Villingen-Schwenningen
- Location within Germany Location within Baden-Württemberg
- Coordinates: 48°03′37″N 08°27′31″E
- Country: Germany
- State: Baden-Württemberg
- Admin. region: Freiburg
- District: Schwarzwald-Baar-Kreis
- Subdivisions: 3 Stadtbezirke

Government
  - Mayor (2018–26): Jürgen Roth (CDU)

Area
  - Total: 165.5 km^{2} (63.9 sq mi)
- Elevation: 704 m (2,310 ft)

Population (2025-12-31)
  - Total: 89,766
  - Density: 542.4/km^{2} (1,405/sq mi)
- Time zone: UTC+01:00 (CET)
  - Summer (DST): UTC+02:00 (CEST)
- Postal codes: 78001–78056
- Dialling codes: 07721, 07720, 07425, 07705
- Vehicle registration: VS
- Website: www.villingen-schwenningen.de

Villingen-Schwenningen (German pronunciation: [ˈfɪlɪŋən ˈʃvɛnɪŋən]; Low Alemannic: Villinge-Schwenninge) is a city in the Schwarzwald-Baar district in southern Baden-Württemberg, in south-western Germany. It had 89,743 inhabitants as of September 2024.

== History ==
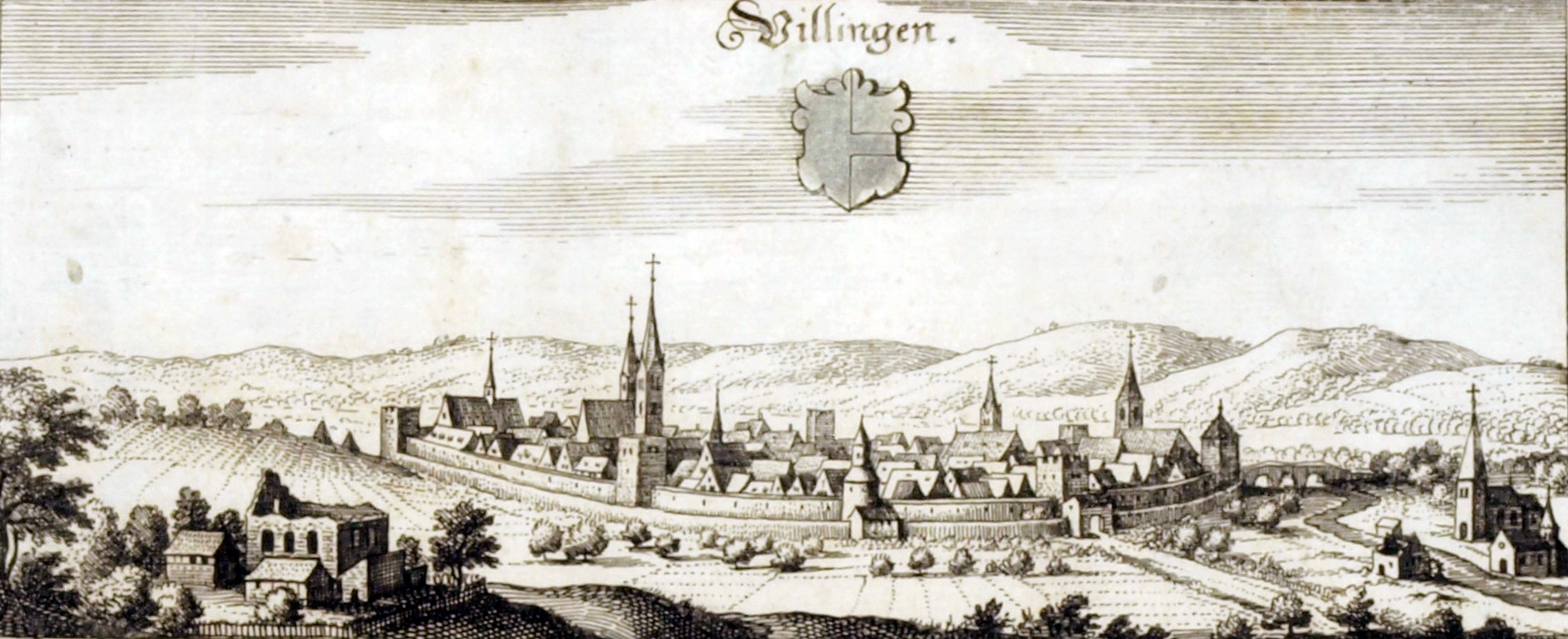
17th-century skyline of Villingen

In the Middle Ages, Villingen was a town under Austrian lordship. During the Protestant Reformation it remained Catholic. Villingen came to international attention when it was besieged by Marshal of France Camille d'Hostun, duc de Tallard on 17 July 1704. Colonel Von Wilstorff put up a stout defence of the outdated fortifications, and after six days the siege failed.

Schwenningen remained a village until the 19th century. In 1858, the first watch factory was established, and watchmaking and precision mechanics have been important industries ever since. The town styled itself "the greatest watch city in the world" at one time, and the Kienzle Uhren watchmaking company was founded there in 1822 and remained until moving to Hamburg in 2002. The Museum of Clockmaking celebrates the town's clock and watchmaking history.

During World War II, in March 1940, the Stalag V-B prisoner-of-war camp was established, in which Polish, French, British, Serbian, Soviet, Belgian, American and Italian POWs were held. Additionally, in November 1942, the Stalag 315 prisoner-of-war camp was relocated from Przemyśl in German-occupied Poland to Villingen, and was later further relocated to the German-occupied Netherlands in 1943.

As part of the Baden-Württemberg territorial reform of 1972, Villingen and Schwenningen were merged with a number of surrounding villages to form the city of Villingen-Schwenningen. Nevertheless, the two halves of the city are separated by a plateau and remain distinct. Villingen is a former part of Baden, while Schwenningen is a former part of Württemberg.

Villingen is a major center of German carnival celebrations. The traditional Narros represent the old citizens of Villingen: Alt Villingere, Morbili, Narro, Suribbel.

== Geography ==
Villingen-Schwenningen lies on the eastern edge of the Black Forest about 700 m (2,300 ft) above sea level. The source of the river Neckar, a main tributary of the Rhine, is in Schwenningen (Schwenninger Moos) whereas Villingen is traversed by the river Brigach which is the shorter one of the two headstreams of the Danube.

=== Climate ===
Climate data for Villingen-Schwenningen (1991-2020)
Month	Jan	Feb	Mar	Apr	May	Jun	Jul	Aug	Sep	Oct	Nov	Dec	Year
Daily mean °C (°F)	−0.9 (30.4)	−0.3 (31.5)	3.5 (38.3)	7.6 (45.7)	11.9 (53.4)	15.7 (60.3)	17.4 (63.3)	17.0 (62.6)	12.4 (54.3)	8.1 (46.6)	3.2 (37.8)	−0.1 (31.8)	8.0 (46.3)
Average precipitation mm (inches)	76.1 (3.00)	64.0 (2.52)	63.7 (2.51)	53.3 (2.10)	91.0 (3.58)	83.5 (3.29)	87.2 (3.43)	77.9 (3.07)	56.4 (2.22)	69.7 (2.74)	65.0 (2.56)	85.9 (3.38)	873.7 (34.4)
Mean monthly sunshine hours	67.7	89.6	139.3	170.2	193.9	214.9	230.6	217.9	164.8	116.3	71.6	58.3	1,735.1
Source: Deutscher Wetterdienst

== Gallery ==
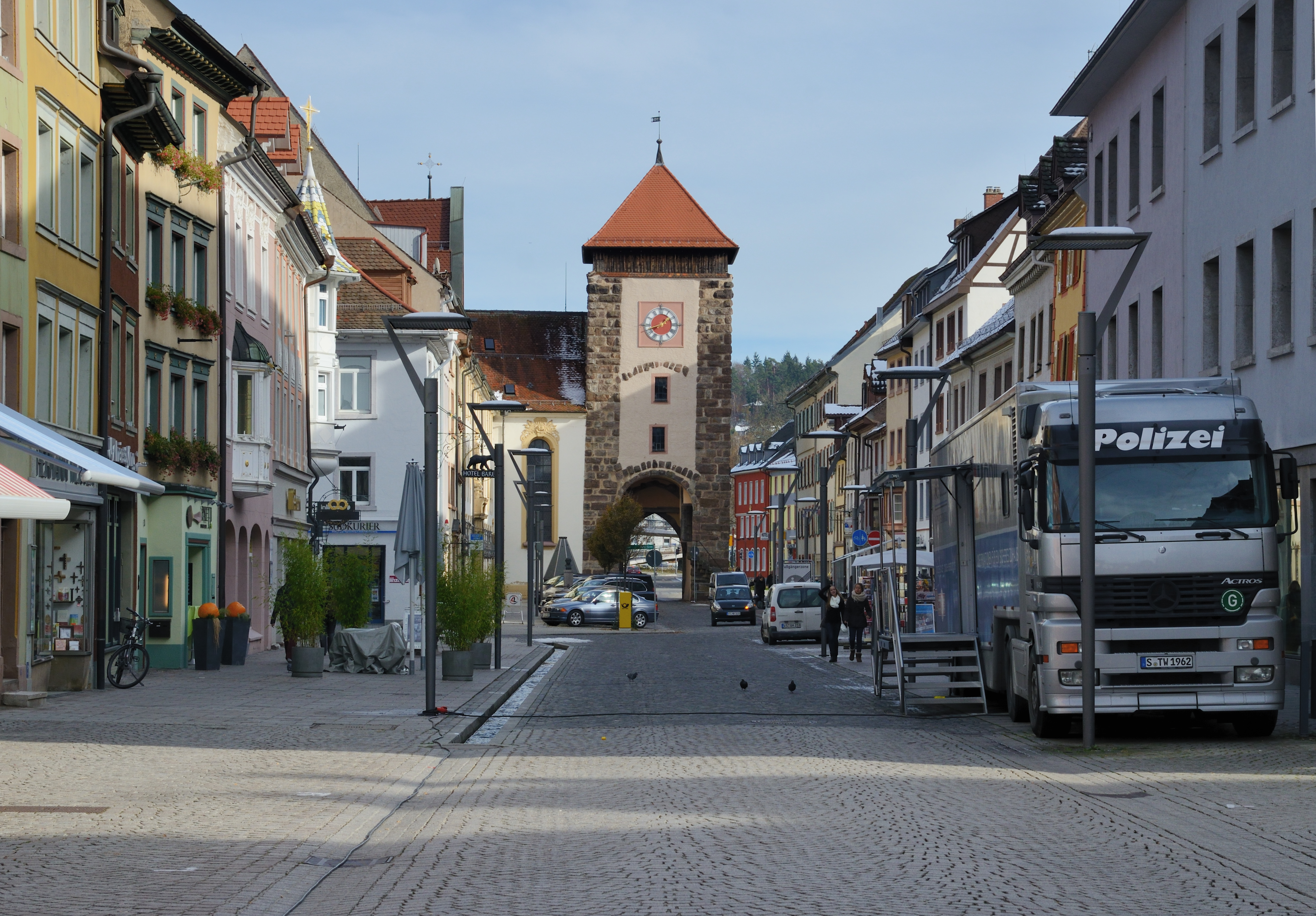
Villingen

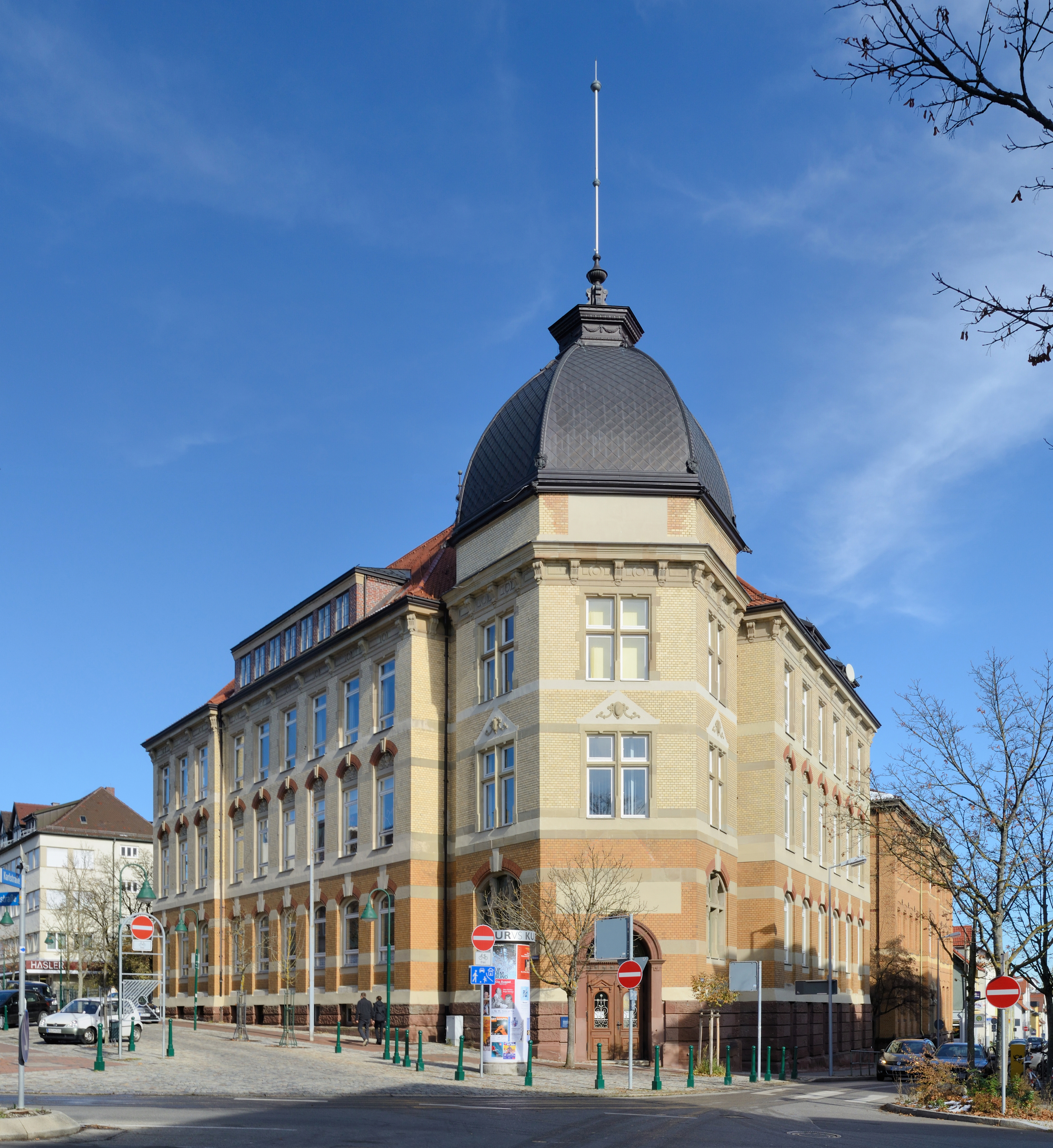
Schwenningen – Janusz Korczak School

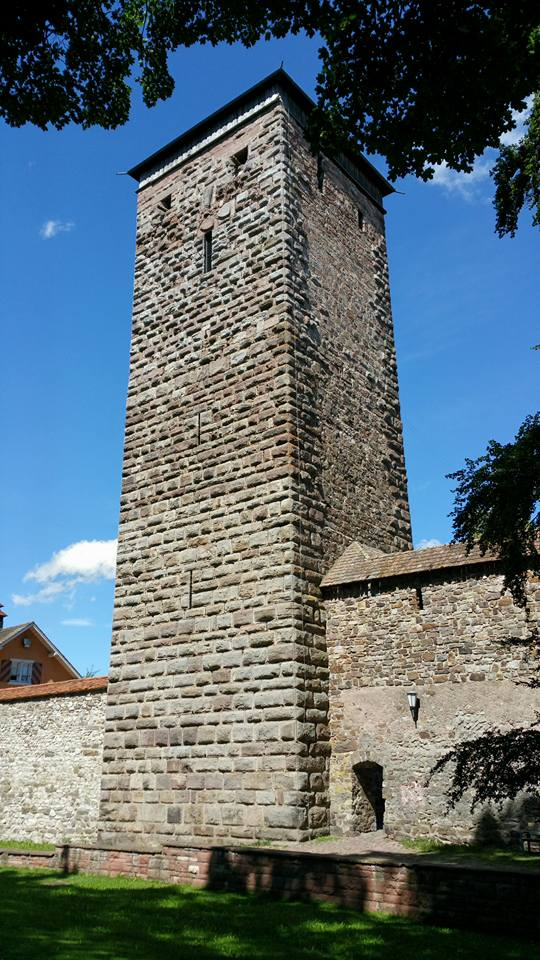
Villingen Romäus tower

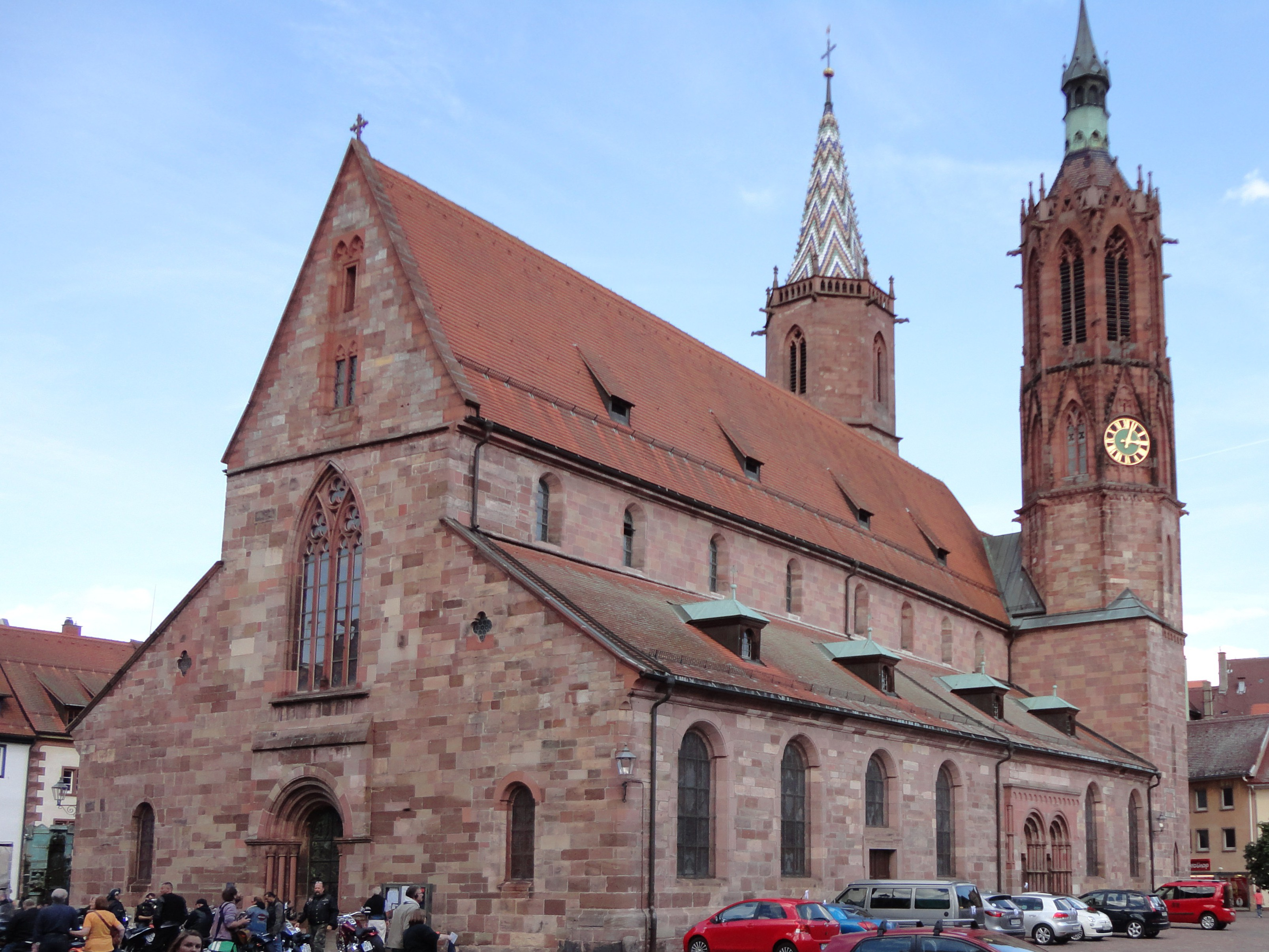
Münster Villingen West side

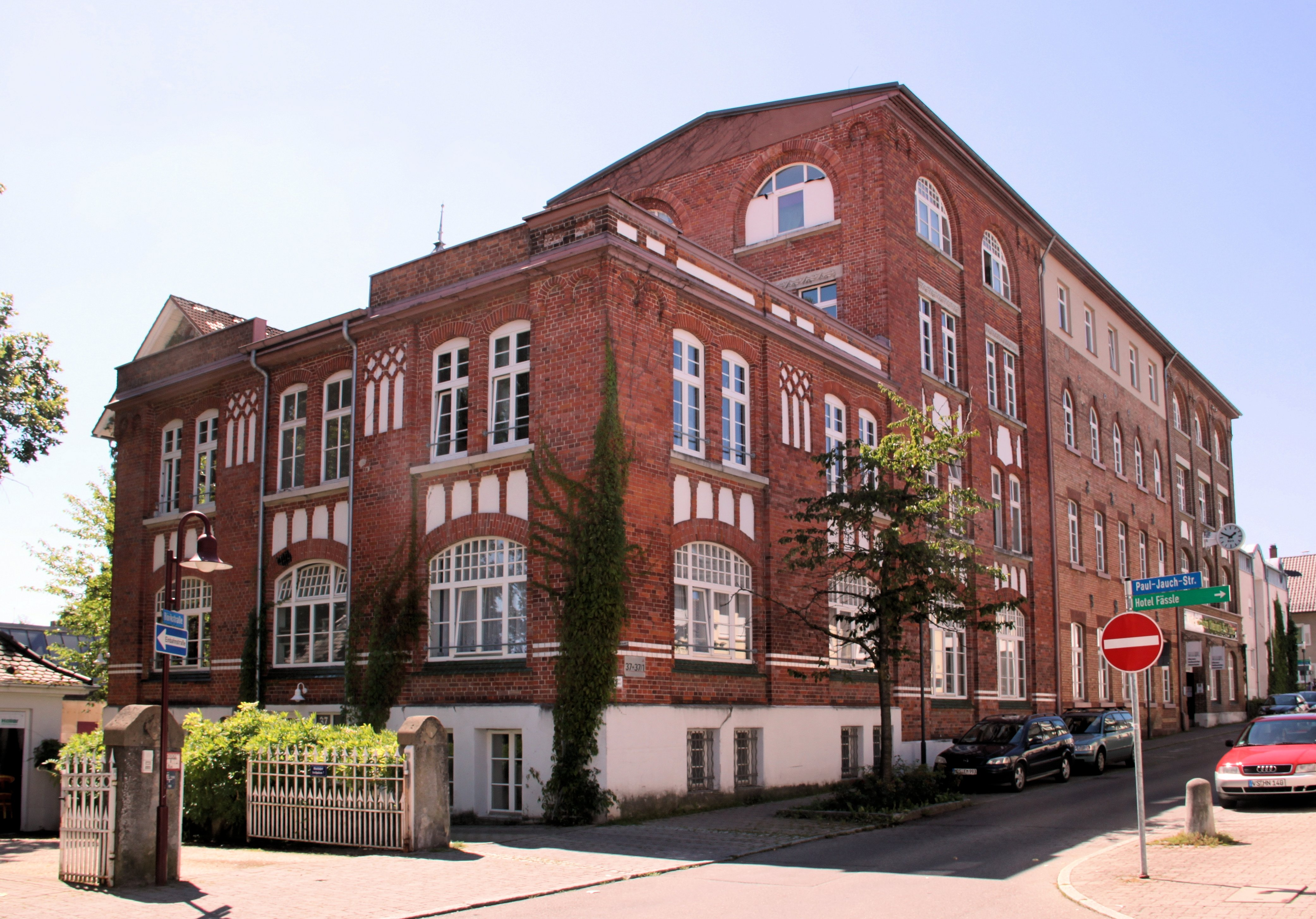
Villingen-Schwenningen Watch factory Bürk Museum of watch industry

== Boroughs ==
- Villingen
  - Villingen
  - Pfaffenweiler
  - Marbach
  - Tannheim
  - Rietheim
  - Herzogenweiler
- Schwenningen
  - Schwenningen
  - Obereschach
  - Weigheim
  - Weilersbach
- Mühlhausen

== Mayors and Lord mayors ==
=== Schwenningen ===
- 1797–1816: Erhard Bürk
- 1816–1819: (Vogt)
- 1819–1821: Thomas Wegler
- 1821–1825: ?
- 1825–1835: Matthias Rapp
- 1835–1841: Johann Georg Koch
- 1841–1852: Andreas Bürk
- 1852–1857: Christian Strohm
- 1857–1887: Erhard Müller
- 1887–1912: David Würth
- 1912–1925: Emil Braunagel
- 1925–1930: Ingo Lang von Langen
- 1930–1948: Otto Gönnenwein
- 1949–1962: Hans Kohler
- 1962–1972: Gerhard Gebauer

=== Villingen ===
- 1912–1930: Guido Lehmann
- 1931–1933: Adolf Gremmelspacher
- 1933: Gutmann, temporary
- 1933–1937: Hermann Schneider
- 1937–1940: Karl Berckmüller
- 1940–1945: Hermann Riedel
- 1945–1946: Walter Bräunlich
- 1946: Edwin Hartmann
- 1946–1950: Edwin Nägele
- 1950–1972: Severin Kern

=== Villingen-Schwenningen ===
- 1972–1994: Gerhard Gebauer (SPD)
- 1994–2002: Manfred Matusza (CDU)
- 2002–2019: Rupert Kubon (SPD)
- since 2019: Jürgen Roth (CDU)

== Population ==
=== Number of inhabitants ===
Date	Inhabitants
31 December 1972	78,436
31 December 1980	78,904
31 December 1990	78,218
31 December 1995	80,734
31 December 2005	81,778
31 December 2015	84,674
31 December 2017	84,818
31 December 2018	85,181
31 December 2019	85,922
31 December 2020	85,866
31 December 2021	86,619

Source: State Statistical Office of Baden-Württemberg

=== Largest communities of foreigners ===
Italy
Turkey
Croatia
Romania
Syria
Serbia
Greece
Poland
Kosovo
Bosnia

== Business and education ==
Precision Motors Deutsche Minebea GmbH is a subsidiary of Minebea corporation and developing electric DC motors in Villingen-Schwenningen. Villingen-Schwenningen is the European HQ for the Japanese corporation.

Villingen-Schwenningen is the home of State University for Applied Science for policing (Hochschule für Polizei Baden-Württemberg) of Baden-Württemberg Police. The university was established in 1979 and has a capacity of 1.300 students.

== Transport ==
The city does not have it own airport. The nearest airports are Zurich Airport, Strasbourg Airport, EuroAirport Basel Mulhouse Freiburg, and Stuttgart Airport.

== Sights ==
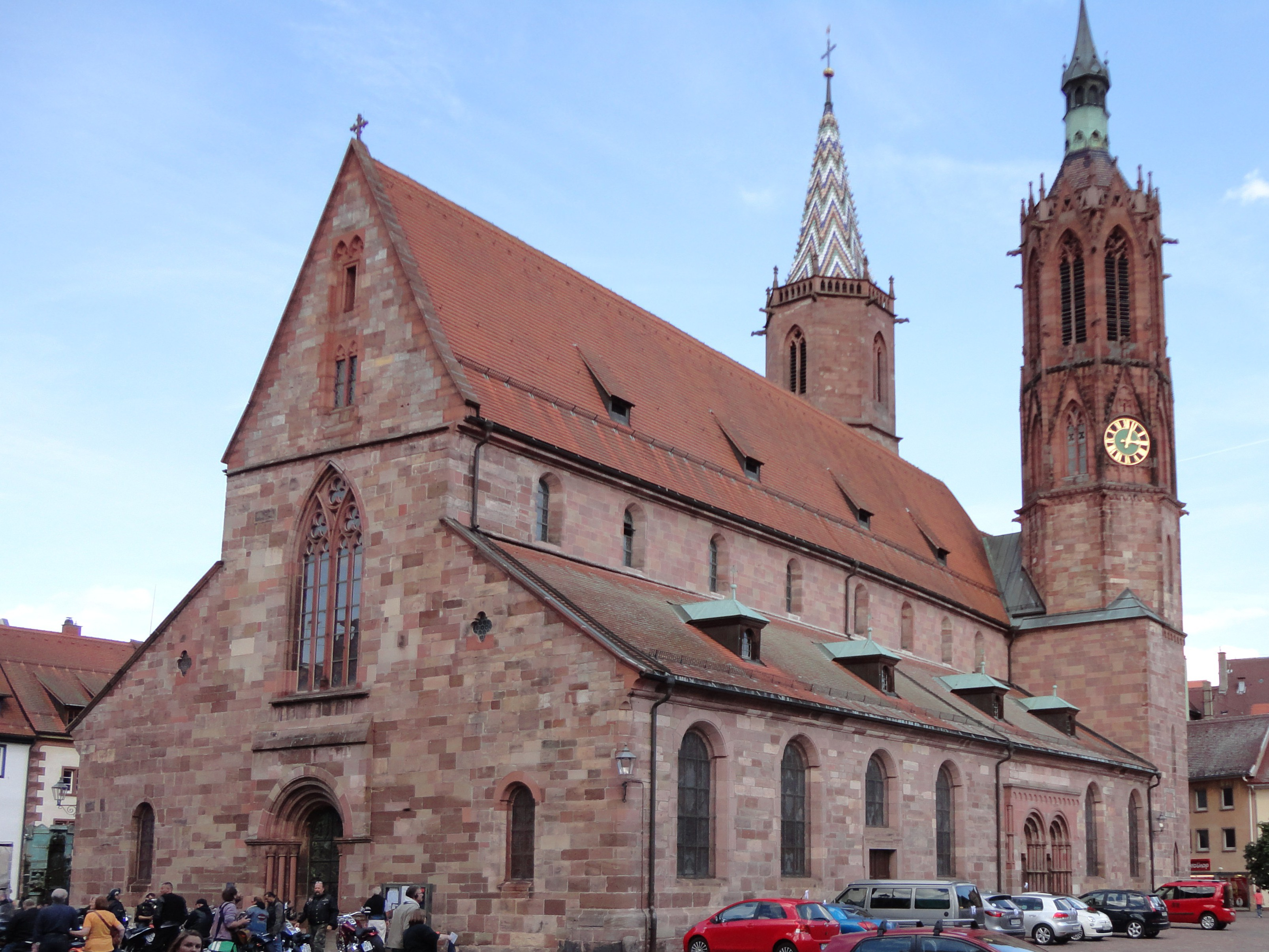
Minster of Our Lady

- Town wall
- Municipal Art Gallery
- Franciscan Monastery Museum
- Schwenningen Clock Museum
- Minster of Our Lady
- Theater am Ring
- Wanne Observation Tower, one of the oldest towers built of iron
- Internationales Luftfahrt-Museum, aviation museum

== Sports ==
Since 1904, Villingen-Schwenningen has also been home to the ice hockey team the Schwenninger Wild Wings, which competes in the Deutsche Eishockey Liga.

The town's football club is FC 08 Villingen, who in the 2021/22 season are competing in the Oberliga Baden-Württemberg at the fifth tier of the German league system.

== Twin towns – sister cities ==
Villingen-Schwenningen is twinned with:

- Pontarlier, France
- La Valette du Var, France
- Tula, Russia
- Savona, Italy
- Zittau, Germany
- Friedrichsthal, Germany

== Notable people ==
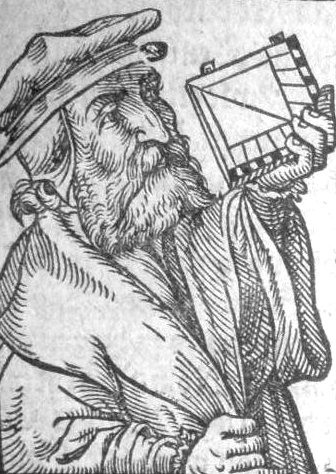
Georg Pictorius, from 1588

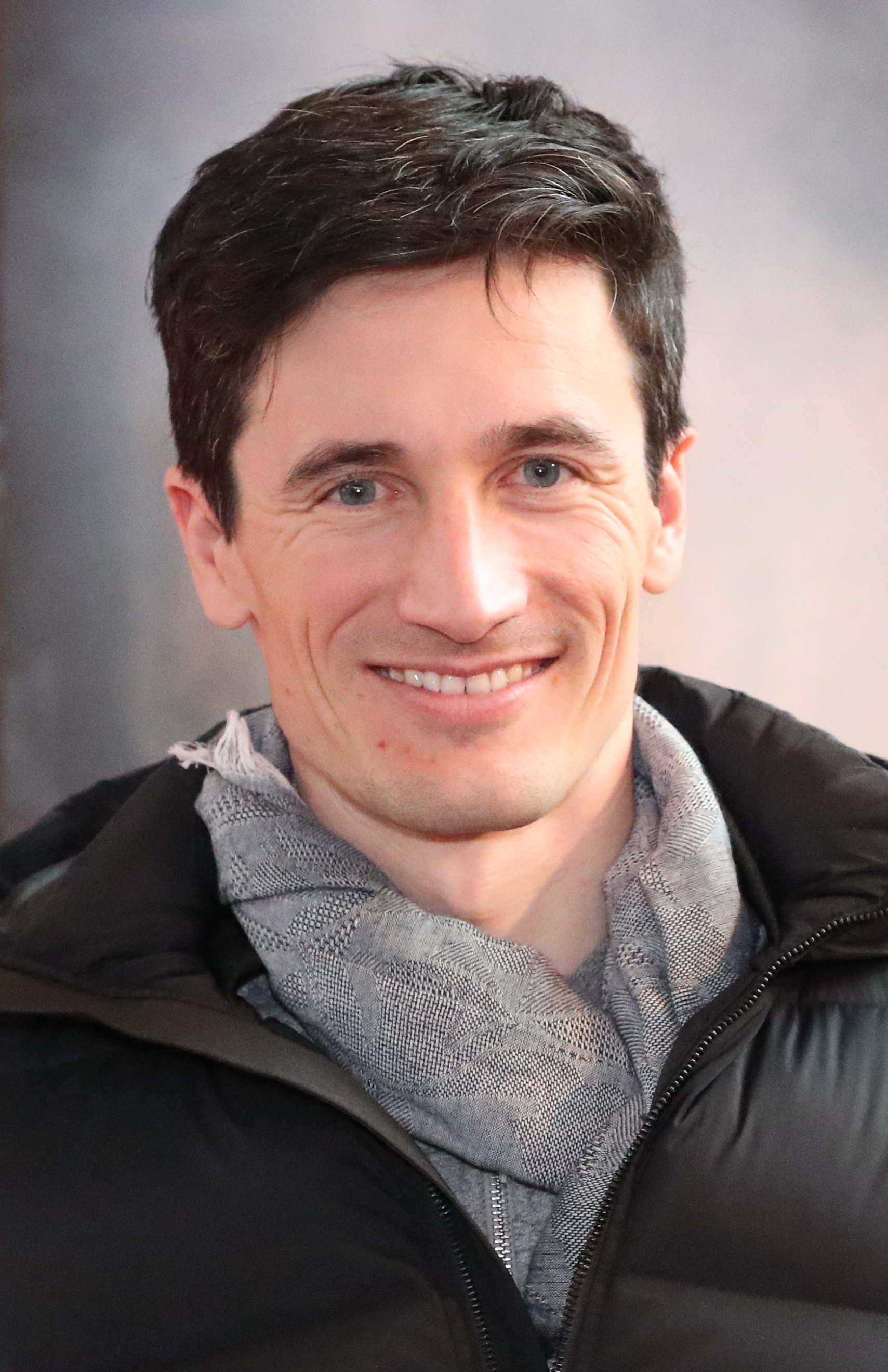
Martin Schmitt, 2018

- Georg Pictorius (c. 1500–1569), physician and mystic-magical author of the Renaissance
- Trudpert Neugart (1742–1825), professor of oriental languages.
- Johannes Benzing (1913–2001), Turkologist and diplomat
- Martin Barner (1921–2020), mathematician, worked on differential geometry and analysis.
- Kurt Leichtweiss (1927–2013), mathematician, worked on convex and differential geometry
- Hartmann von der Tann (born 1943), German radio and television journalist
- Gisèle Pelicot (born 1952), French rape victim and feminist icon
- Horst Ludwig Meyer (1956–1999), presumed member of the Red Army Faction (RAF)
- Veit Heinichen (born 1957), author of noir novels
- Gundolf Köhler (1959–1980), right-wing extremist at the Oktoberfest bombing
- Andreas K. Engel (born 1961), brain researcher
- Markus Kemmelmeier (born 1967), social psychologist and sociologist
- Daniela Alfinito (born 1971), schlager singer and geriatric nurse
- Michelle (born 1972), singer, real name Tanja Gisela Hewer

=== Sport ===
- Beate Bischler (born 1968), retired Paralympic judoka who won a bronze medal at the 2004 Summer Paralympics
- Robert Prosinečki (born 1969), Croatian footballer and coach, played 404 games and 49 for Croatia
- Thorsten Schmitt (born 1975), Nordic combined skier
- Oliver Roggisch (born 1978), handball player
- Martin Schmitt (born 1978), ski jumper, won one gold and two silver Olympic medals
- Andreas Lang (born 1979), curler
- Dennis Seidenberg (born 1981), ice hockey player
- Ivana Brkljačić (born 1983), Croatian hammer thrower
- Jochen Schöps (born 1983), volleyball player
- Marco Caligiuri (born 1984), German-Italian footballer, played 404 games
- Yannic Seidenberg (born 1984), ice hockey player
- Daniel Caligiuri (born 1988), German-Italian footballer, played over 450 games
- Daniel Keilwitz (born 1989), racing driver
- Sebastian Rudy (born 1990), footballer, has played 395 games and 29 for Germany
- Christian Günter (born 1993), footballer who has played 345 games for SC Freiburg and 8 for Germany
- Domenic Weinstein (born 1994), cyclist
- Kai Brünker (born 1994), footballer who has played over 260 games
- Kai Wissmann, (DE Wiki) (born 1996), ice hockey player

and

In 2004 the former Bosnian boxer Armin „Boki“ Ćulum founded the motorcycle-like gang United Tribuns in Villingen-Schwenningen. The gang owned two bordellos and had a great influence on the prostitution scene in Villingen-Schwenningen. The gang called itself a group of bodybuilders, martial art athletes and bouncers. The United Tribuns grew fast and led to rivalry with the Hells Angels and Bandidos. United Tribuns had chapters in München, Augsburg, Nürnberg and Ingolstadt, and from 2014 also in the north in Hannover and later in Osnabrück. In Austria there was a chapter in Linz, Klagenfurt and Vienna. In September 2022 the Federal Minister for the Interior (BMI) prohibited the gang; and their money was confiscated.
