= Mythical theology =

Branch of theology featuring narratives

Mythical theology (theologica mythica) is one of three types of theology defined by the Roman scholar Marcus Terentius Varro (116–27 BC) in his lost work Antiquitates rerum humanarum et divinarum. The other two are political theology (theologia civilis) and natural theology (theologia naturalis).

Mythical theology is practiced by story-tellers, especially poets, based on narratives (mythoi) pertaining to divine matters. Divine revelation was claimed or implied by some of these story-tellers, or their disciples.

Theologians of civil or political theology are administrators, defining how the gods relate to daily life and the state (see imperial cult). Theologians of natural theology are philosophers, inquiring into the nature of the gods, as evidenced by nature and reason.

"Mythical theology" should be distinguished from the theologia mystica of Pseudo-Dionysius the Areopagite.

== See also ==
- Mythology and religion
- Mythopoeic thought
- Theologia mythologica
