= Antiquitates rerum humanarum et divinarum =

Work of Varro

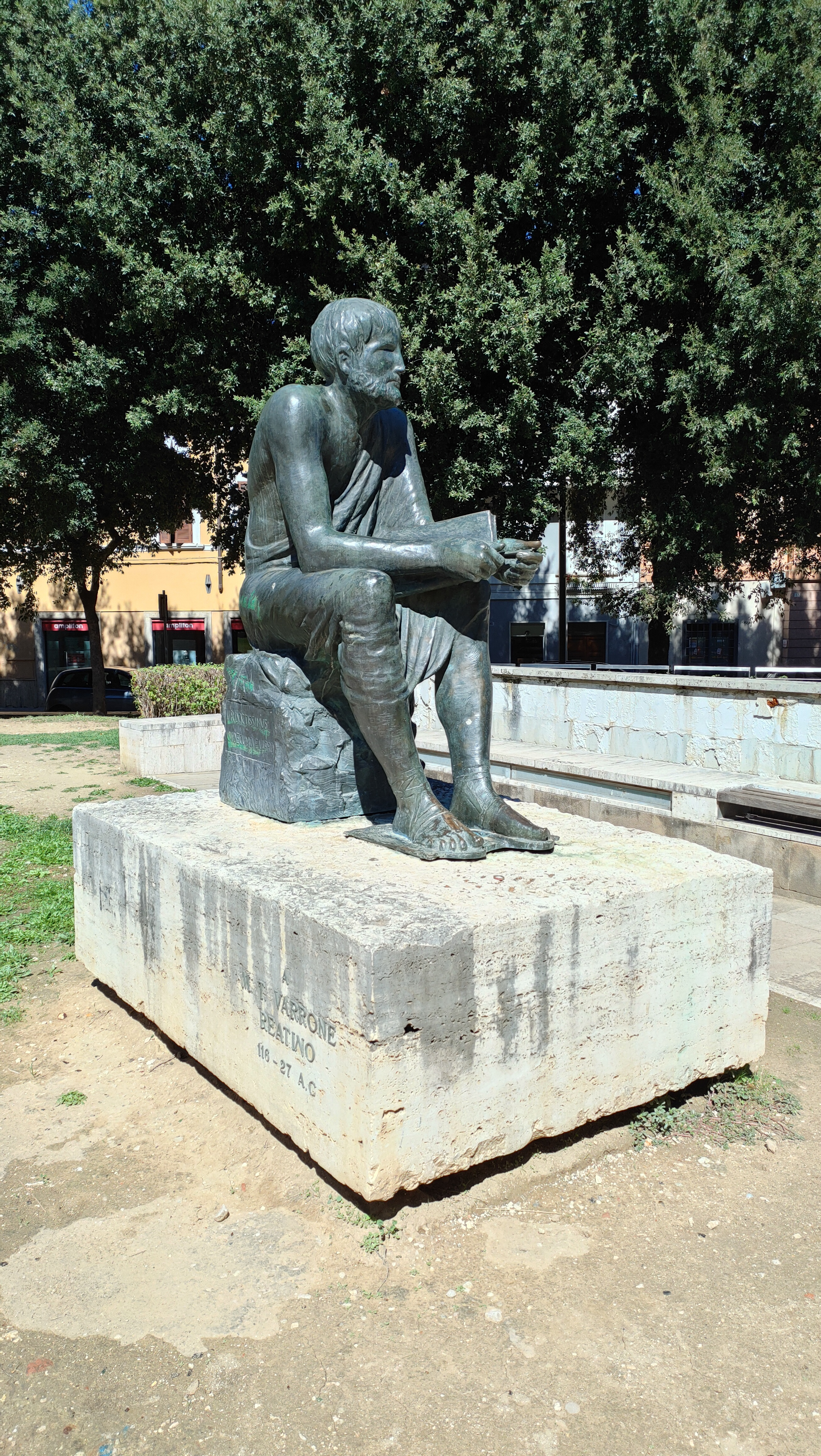
Statue of Marcus Terentius Varro in Rieti

Antiquitates rerum humanarum et divinarum (Antiquities of Human and Divine Things) was one of the chief works of Marcus Terentius Varro (1st century BC). The work has been lost, but having been substantially quoted by Augustine in his De civitate Dei (published AD 426) its contents can be reconstructed in parts. To a lesser extent, quotes from the work have also been transmitted by other authors, including (among others) Pliny (1st c.), Gellius (2nd c.), Censorinus (3rd c.), Servius (4th/5th c.), Nonius (4th/5th c.), Macrobius (5th c.) and Priscian (5th/6th c.).

The work was divided into 41 books (libri), of which the first 25 were dealing with Res humanae ("human affairs") and the remaining 16 with Res divinae ("divine affairs"). It was above all an account of the cultural and institutional history of Rome and the Roman religion. It was written in the 50s or 40s BC.

In Res divinae, Varro introduced the division of divinity into three parts, into mythical theology, natural theology and civil theology. The concept of "natural theology" in particular has become influential via the transmission by Augustine. The topical division of Res divinae into 16 books has been preserved. Books 1–4 were dedicated to priesthood (de hominibus), 5–7 to cult sites (de locis), 8–10 to the religious calendar of festivals (de temporibus), 11–13 to ritual (de sacris), and 14–16 to the gods (de dis), especially discussing the etymology of their names.

The work is based on Stoic sources. Varro refutes the poetic or "mythical theology" as popular superstition, complaining that the pure veneration of the divine had been spoiled by the influence of the poets, but he considers valuable the philosophical debate on the nature of the gods. Varro presents the Roman king Numa Pompilius as a paragon of ancient piety. Numa was associated with Pythagoreanism, even though Varro granted that Numa could not have been a Pythagorean since he lived before Pythagoras himself.
