= Obereschach (Villingen-Schwenningen) =

- Ortsteil of Villingen-Schwenningen
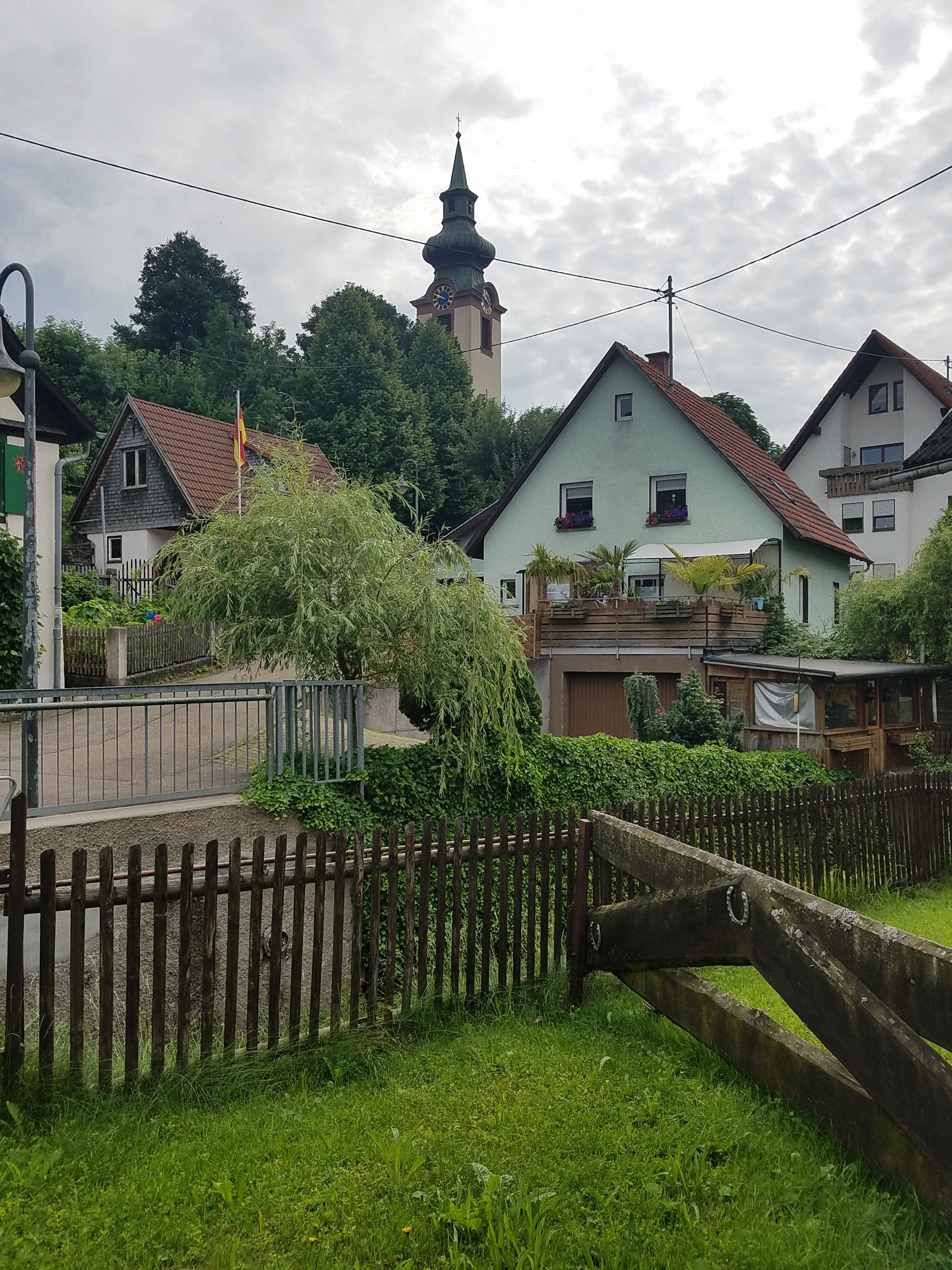
- The village center of the town of Obereschach, with the tower of the Church of St. Ulrich in the background

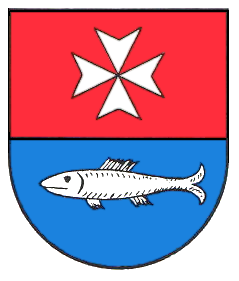
- Coat of arms
- Interactive map of Obereschach
- Location within Germany Location within Baden-Württemberg
- Coordinates: 48°06′N 08°28′E
- Country: Germany
- State: Baden-Württemberg
- Admin. region: Freiburg
- District: Schwarzwald-Baar-Kreis
- Town: Villingen-Schwenningen

Government
  - Mayor: Jürgen Goltz
- Elevation: 760 m (2,490 ft)
- Time zone: UTC+01:00 (CET)
  - Summer (DST): UTC+02:00 (CEST)
- Vehicle registration: VS
- Website: www.villingen-schwenningen.de/rathaus-leben/ortschaften/obereschach/

Obereschach is a district (Ortsteil) of the city of Villingen-Schwenningen, located on the eastern edge of the Black Forest in Baden-Württemberg, Germany. It lies at an elevation between 690 and 760 meters (2,260 and 2,490 ft) above sea level and today forms the northernmost borough of Villingen-Schwenningen.

== Geography ==
Historically, Obereschach developed as a clustered village (Haufendorf) on the southern bank of the Eschach River, with later expansion along a street-village axis extending to the northwest. A modern industrial area lies to the northeast.

== History ==
Archaeological evidence, including row grave finds near the field known as Ebenhausen, suggests that Obereschach may have been settled during the period of Alemannic or Frankish expansion.

The name Aschaha is recorded around 1086 (in a 17th-century copy), with later variants including Obr. Ezza (1260) and Oberaschach (1275). The name Ezza (later Eschach) is thought to be derived from esch (river fish) and ach (water).

By the late 11th century, a local noble family is attested in the area. Prior to 1386, the castle near the parish church was held by the knights of Weitingen, who were succeeded by the Knights Hospitaller of Villingen. The commandery had already acquired several farms and rights in Obereschach by 1354, and the village became fully part of the order by 1390 with the entry of Walter Laechler into the commandery. The Hospitallers retained lordship over the village until 1805. Subsequently, Obereschach came under Württemberg rule and from 1806 under the Grand Duchy of Baden.

On December 1, 1971, the previously independent municipality of Obereschach was incorporated into the city of Villingen as part of administrative reforms.

== Religion ==
The parish of Obereschach was first mentioned in 1275. By 1293, the advowson was held by the Laechler family and B. Hämmerlin of Villingen, and in 1354 was sold by the Seng brothers of Villingen to the Knights Hospitaller. The original Church of St. Ulrich was replaced with a new structure in 1821. The parish includes Obereschach and Mönchweiler. Since 1972, Protestant residents have belonged to the St. Peter's parish in Villingen.

== Folk traditions ==
In 1895, the local schoolteacher of Obereschach completed a detailed response to the Fragebogen zur Sammlung der Volksüberlieferungen ("Questionnaire for the Collection of Folk Traditions"), a folkloristic survey conducted across Baden. The resulting manuscript, now preserved by the Badisches Landesmuseum in Karlsruhe, documents a variety of regional customs, dialect expressions, superstitions, and children's rhymes as they were remembered or practiced in Obereschach at the end of the 19th century.

== Notable people ==
- Berthold Rottler, OSB (1748–1836), born in Obereschach, was the last prince-abbot of the Abbey of St. Blaise in the Black Forest (1801–1806). From 1809 until his death, he served as abbot of the Abbey of St. Paul in Lavanttal.
