= Hartmann von der Tann =

German journalist

- Born: Jörg Hartmann Freiherr von und zu der Tann-Rathsamhausen; 30 June 1943 (age 83); Villingen, Germany
- Occupations: Radio and television journalist, correspondent
- Years active: 1972–present

Jörg Hartmann Freiherr von und zu der Tann-Rathsamhausen (born 30 June 1943 in Villingen), known as Hartmann von der Tann, is a German radio and television journalist.

== Life ==
From 1966 to 1972, Tann studied at the University of Würzburg.

He worked as a journalist for German broadcaster ARD. As correspondent, Tann worked for ARD in Mexico and countries in South America. As sport reporter he worked for ARD at horse sport events.

== Awards ==
- 1998: Telestar
