= Natural theology =

Theology reliant on rational and empirical arguments

Natural theology is a type of theology that seeks to provide arguments for theological topics, such as the existence of a deity, based on human reason. It is distinguished from revealed theology, which is based on supernatural sources such as scripture or religious experiences. It is thus a form of theology open to critical examination, aimed at understanding the divine.

Natural theology does not preclude the concept of divine intervention nor presuppose a clockwork universe; however, it demands that any position be supported through reasoned arguments based on natural reason.

In contemporary philosophy, natural theology is not limited to approaches based on empirical facts, such as natural phenomena, nor are its conclusions limited to pantheism. It was once also termed "physico-theology". (Note: Etymology: φὐσις, physis (nature))

Natural theology includes theology based on scientific discoveries, arguments for God's existence grounded in observed natural facts, and interpretations of natural phenomena or complexities as evidence of a divine plan (see predestination) or God's Will. It also includes efforts to explain the nature of celestial motors, gods, or a supreme god responsible for heavenly motion. Natural theologians have offered their own explanations for some unsolved problems in science.

== Overview ==
=== Natural theology and physico-theology ===
In the modern understanding, natural theology does not solely refer to the study of God based on natural facts but rather to the study of God based on natural reason. Although the term "physico-theology" is still occasionally used to describe an earlier understanding, natural theology does not necessarily involve teleological arguments, such as the defense of creationism or the intelligent design hypothesis, as seen in 19th–century England. Also, a posteriori cosmological arguments such as Aristotle's first mover theory and a priori ontological arguments such as those of Anselm and Descartes fall within the scope of natural theology.

Furthermore, natural theology is not limited to Christian theology. As will be described later, natural theology—i.e., the study of God through reason rather than revelation—has been explored by ancient Greeks such as Plato and by Islamic philosophers such as Ibn Sina.

=== History ===
For monotheistic religions, this principally involves arguments about the attributes or non-attributes of a deity, and especially the deity's existence, using arguments that do not involve recourse to revelation.

The ideals of natural theology can be traced back to the Old Testament and Greek philosophy. Early sources evident of these ideals come from Jeremiah and the Wisdom of Solomon (c. 50 BC) and Plato's dialogue Timaeus (c. 360 BC). Aristotle's tractate on metaphysics argues for the necessary existence of an unmoved prime mover.

Marcus Terentius Varro (116–27 BC) established a distinction between political theology (the social functions of religion), natural theology and mythical theology. His terminology became part of the Stoic tradition and then Christianity through Augustine of Hippo and Thomas Aquinas.

== Ancient Greece ==
Besides Hesiod's Works and Days and Zarathushtra's Gathas, philosopher Plato gives the earliest surviving account of a natural theology.

=== Plato ===
In Timaeus, Plato stated that the cosmos had to have been rationally made by a divine craftsman.

In the Timaeus, written c. 360 BC, in the preamble to the account of the origin of the cosmos, we read: "We must first investigate concerning [the whole Cosmos] that primary question which has to be investigated at the outset in every case ... namely, whether it has always existed, having no beginning or generation, or whether it has come into existence, having begun from some beginning." The subsequent parts of the text argues for the necessity of a divine craftsman, who rationally constructed the cosmos out of pre-existing chaos (Timaeus 27d-30c) In the Laws, in answer to the question as to what arguments justify faith in the gods, Plato affirms: "One is our dogma about the soul...the other is our dogma concerning the ordering of the motion of the stars".

In Book II of the Republic and Book X of the Laws, Plato argues against the following ideas:

1. Gods do not exist.
2. They exist but do not care about humans.
3. They are easily persuaded by offerings and prayers.

=== Aristotle ===
Aristotle's tractate on metaphysics claims to demonstrate the necessary existence of an unmoved prime mover.

== Ancient Rome ==
Marcus Terentius Varro in his (lost) Antiquitates rerum humanarum et divinarum (Antiquities of Human and Divine Things, 1st century BC) established a distinction between three kinds of theology: civil (political) (theologia civilis), natural (physical) (theologia naturalis) and mythical (theologia mythica). The theologians of civil theology are "the people", asking how the gods relate to daily life and the state (imperial cult). The theologians of natural theology are the philosophers, asking about the nature of the gods, and the theologians of mythical theology are the poets, crafting mythology.

== Middle Ages ==
Saint Thomas Aquinas, one of the most influential thinkers in all of Western philosophy, was a major promoter of natural theology.

From the 8th century AD, the Mutazilite school of Islam, compelled to defend their principles against the orthodox Islam of their day, used philosophy for support, and were among the first to pursue a rational Islamic theology, termed Ilm-al-Kalam (scholastic theology). The teleological argument was later presented by the early Islamic philosophers Alkindus and Averroes, while Avicenna presented both the cosmological argument and the ontological argument in The Book of Healing (1027).

Italian Dominican friar and philosopher Thomas Aquinas (c. 1225 – 1274) presented several versions of the cosmological argument in his famous Summa Theologica, and of the teleological argument in his Summa contra Gentiles. He presented the ontological argument, but rejected it in favor of proofs that invoke cause and effect alone. Thomas's quinque viae ("five ways") in those books sought to demonstrate the existence of God in different ways, including (as way No. 5) the goal-directed actions seen in nature.

== Early modern ==
Raymond of Sabunde's (c. 1385–1436) Theologia Naturalis sive Liber Creaturarum, written 1434–1436, but published posthumously (1484), marks an important stage in the history of natural theology. John Ray (1627–1705) also known as John Wray, was an English naturalist, sometimes referred to as the father of English natural history. He published important works on plants, animals, and natural theology, with the objective "to illustrate the glory of God in the knowledge of the works of nature or creation". Gottfried Wilhelm Leibniz (1646–1716) established another term for natural theology as theodicy, defined exactly as "the justification of God". He viewed the science in a positive light as it supported his personal ethical belief system.

William Derham (1657–1735) continued Ray's tradition of natural theology in two of his own works, Physico-Theology, published during 1713, and Astro-Theology, 1714. These later influenced the work of William Paley.

== Nineteenth century ==
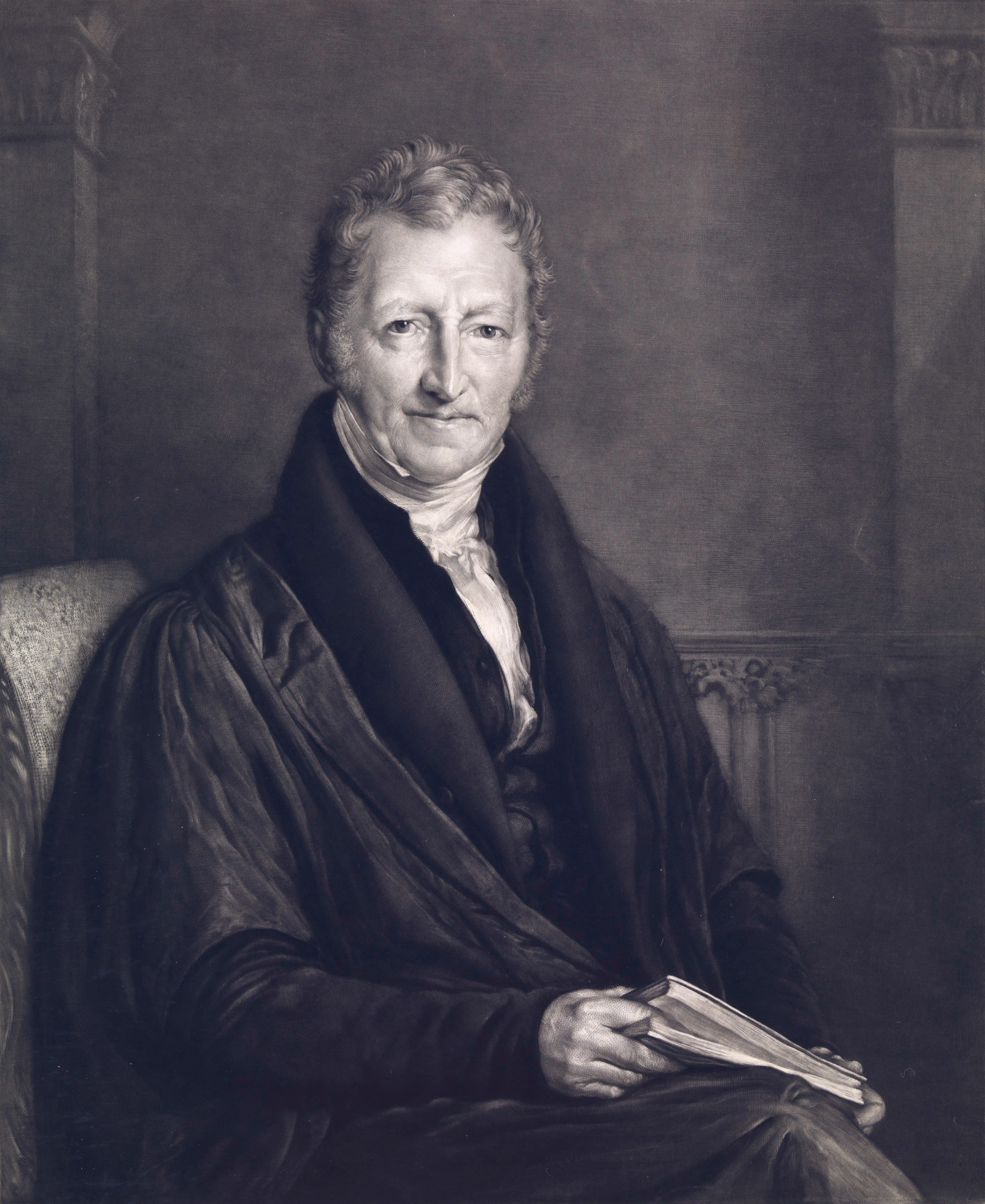
English cleric and scholar Thomas Robert Malthus discussed natural theology in his An Essay on the Principle of Population.

In An Essay on the Principle of Population, published during 1798, Anglican cleric and economist Thomas Robert Malthus ended with two chapters on natural theology and population. Malthus—a devout Christian—argued that revelation would "damp the soaring wings of intellect", and thus never let "the difficulties and doubts of parts of the scripture" interfere with his work.

William Paley, an important influence on Charles Darwin, gave a well-known rendition of the teleological argument for God. During 1802 he published Natural Theology, or Evidences of the Existence and Attributes of the Deity collected from the Appearances of Nature. In this he described the Watchmaker analogy, for which he is probably best known. His book, which was one of the most-published books of the 19th and 20th centuries, presents a number of teleological and cosmological arguments for the existence of God. The book served as a template for many subsequent natural theologies during the 19th century.

The Bridgewater Treatises were eight works "the Power, Wisdom, and Goodness of God, as manifested in the Creation" published during the years 1833 to 1836. They were written by eight scientific authors appointed by the President of the Royal Society using an £8000 bequest from Francis Henry Egerton, 8th Earl of Bridgewater. The series, which was widely read, offered extensive discussion concerning the relationship between religion and science, and many of the authors offered observations on natural theology, although their views on the subject differed widely. Responding critically to one of the series, Charles Babbage published what he termed The Ninth Bridgewater Treatise: A Fragment.

Professor of chemistry and natural history Edward Hitchcock also studied and wrote on natural theology. He attempted to unify and reconcile science and religion, emphasizing geology. His major work of this type was The Religion of Geology and its Connected Sciences (1851).

The Gifford Lectures were established by the will of Adam Lord Gifford to "promote and diffuse the study of Natural Theology in the widest sense of the term—in other words, the knowledge of God." The term "natural theology", as used by Gifford, refers to theology supported by science and not dependent on the miraculous.

== Criticism ==
The ideas of natural theology did not come without criticism. Many opposed the idea of natural theology, but some philosophers had a greater influence, including David Hume, Immanuel Kant, Søren Kierkegaard, and Charles Darwin. Karl Barth's Church Dogmatics also heavily opposed the entirety of natural theology.

Hume's Dialogues Concerning Natural Religion played a major role in his standpoint on natural theology. Hume's ideas heavily stem from the idea of natural belief. It was stated that, "Hume's doctrine of natural belief allows that certain beliefs are justifiably held by all men without regard to the quality of the evidence which may be produced in their favour". However, Hume's argument also stems from the design argument. The design argument comes from people being labeled as morally good or evil. Hume's argument claims that if we restrict ourselves to the idea of good and evil, that we must also assign this to the designer as well. Hume states, "I will allow that pain or misery in man is compatible with infinite power and goodness in the Deity...A mere possible compatibility is not sufficient. You must prove these pure, unmixt, and uncontrollable attributes...". Hume argues for the idea of a morally perfect deity and requires evidence for anything besides that. Hume's arguments against natural theology had a wide influence on many philosophers.

Jean-Baptiste Lamarck rejected natural theology because of his extensive knowledge of the evidence for geological and palaeoclimatic changes, which made the concept of an essentially static world in natural theology untenable to Lamarck.

Darwin's criticism of the theory had a broader impact on scientists and commoners. Darwin's theories showed that humans and animals developed through an evolutionary process. This implied that a chemical reaction was occurring; but it had no influence from the idea of God. However, Darwin's ideas did not erase the question of how the original ideas of matter came to be.

Hume and Kant's ire was not directed at Christian theology, but at the danger of Pagan theology; through refusing natural theology they were denying the legitimacy of Pagan theology.

=== Faith and fideism ===
Immanuel Kant and Søren Kierkegaard had similar ideas about natural theology. Kant's ideas focused more on the natural dialect of reason, while Kierkegaard focused more on the dialect of understanding. Both men suggest that "the natural dialect leads to the question of God". Kant argues for the idea that reason leads to the ideas of God as a regulative principle. Kierkegaard argues that the idea of understanding will ultimately lead itself to becoming faith. Both of these men argue that the idea of God cannot be based solely on the idea of reason, that the dialect and ideals will transcend into faith.

Karl Barth opposed the entirety of natural theology. Barth argued that "by starting from such experience, rather that from the gracious revelation through Jesus Christ, we produce a concept of God that is the projection of the highest we know, a construct of human thinking, divorced from salvation history". Barth argues that God is restricted by the construct of human thinking if he is divorced from salvation. Barth also acknowledges that God is knowable because of his grace. Barth's argument stems from the idea of faith rather than reason. Barth held that God can be known only through Jesus Christ, as revealed in scripture, and that any such attempts should be considered idolatry. As Thomas F. Torrance wrote:

So far as theological content is concerned, Barth's argument runs like this. If the God whom we have actually come to know through Jesus Christ really is Father, Son, and Holy Spirit in his own eternal and undivided Being, then what are we to make of an independent natural theology that terminates, not upon the Being of the Triune God—i.e., upon God as he really is in himself—but upon some Being of God in general? Natural theology by its very operation abstracts the existence of God from his act, so that if it does not begin with deism, it imposes deism upon theology.

— Thomas Torrance, The Ground and Grammar of Theology, p. 89

Søren Kierkegaard questioned the existence of God, rejecting all rational arguments for God's existence (including the teleological argument) on the grounds that reason is inevitably accompanied by doubt. He proposed that the argument from design does not take into consideration future events which may serve to undermine the proof of God's existence: the argument would never finish proving God's existence. In the Philosophical Fragments, Kierkegaard writes:

The works of God are such that only God can perform them. Just so, but where then are the works of the God? The works from which I would deduce his existence are not directly and immediately given. The wisdom in nature, the goodness, the wisdom in the governance of the world – are all these manifest, perhaps, upon the very face of things? Are we not here confronted with the most terrible temptations to doubt, and is it not impossible finally to dispose of all these doubts? But from such an order of things I will surely not attempt to prove God's existence; and even if I began I would never finish, and would in addition have to live constantly in suspense, lest something so terrible should suddenly happen that my bit of proof would be demolished.

— Søren Kierkegaard, Philosophical Fragments

Fideists may reject attempts to prove God's existence.

== See also ==
- Astral religion
- Book of Nature
- Analogy of Religion
- Epicureanism
- Natural magic
- Natural religion
- Religious naturalism
- Scientific Perspectives on Divine Action
- Theistic evolution
- Theistic rationalism
- Theophysics
