= Akaflieg Stuttgart fs26 =

German single-seat motor glider, 1970

fs26 Moseppl
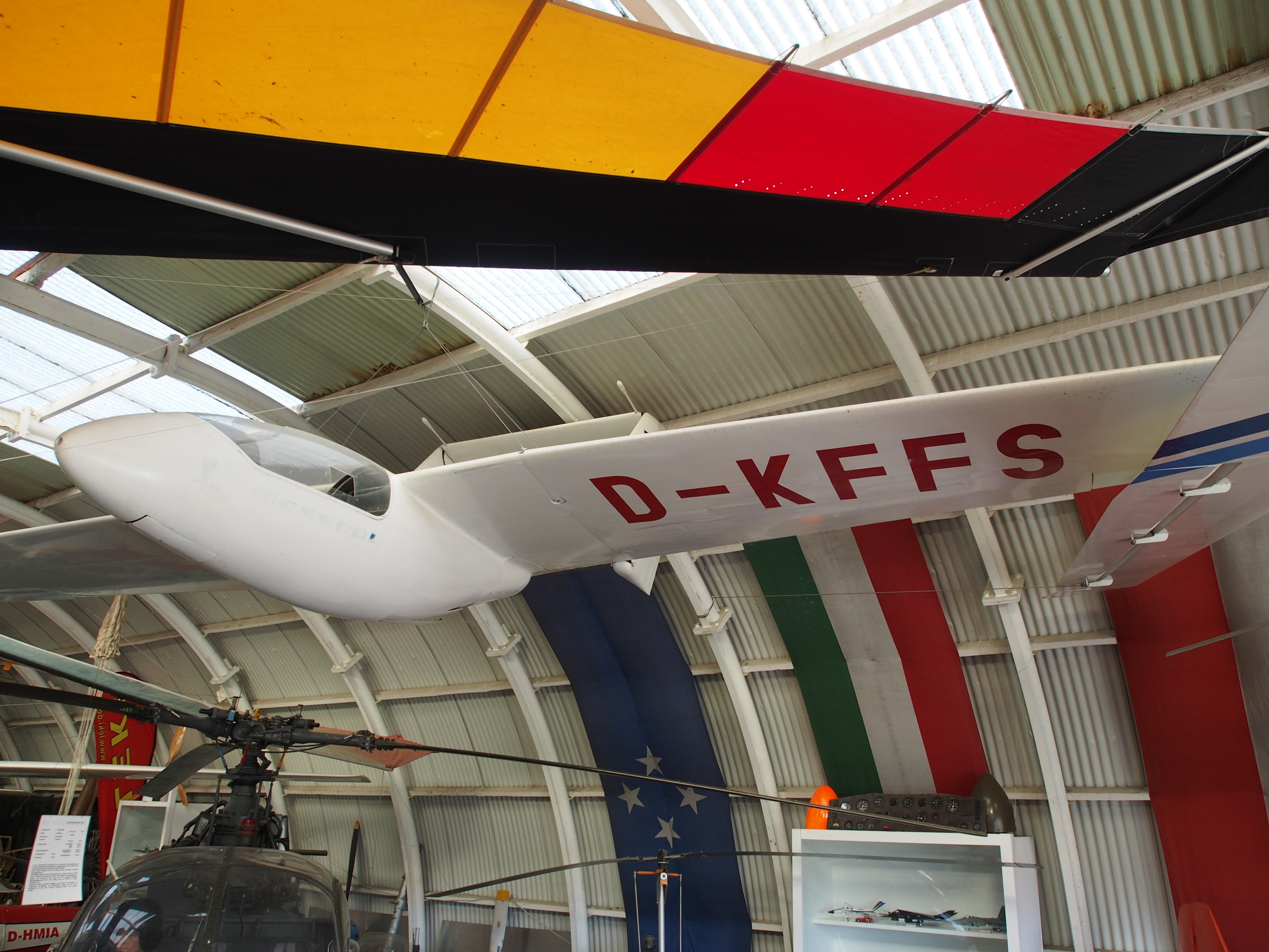

General information
- Type: Motor glider
- National origin: West Germany
- Manufacturer: Akaflieg Stuttgart
- Number built: 1

History
- First flight: 25 September 1970

The Akaflieg Stuttgart fs26 Moseppl is a German single-seat motor glider with twin fins and rudders designed and built by Akaflieg Stuttgart. First flown on the 25 September 1970 it was designed as an experiment and not intended for production.

== Design ==
The fs26 Moseppl is a cantilever high-wing monoplane with a monocoque nacelle fuselage and a glassfibre/balsa sandwich wing structure, fitted with airbrakes but no flaps or ailerons. To make room for the engine the Moseppl has twin fins and rudders attached to the wing trailing edge with an all-moving tailplane between the tops of the vertically surfaces. The pilot sits in an enclosed cockpit with a transparent canopy and the landing gear is a retracting rear monowheel and non-steerable nosewheel. The rear-mounted engine is a 26 hp (19 kW) Solo-Hirth engine with a variable pitch pusher propeller.

== Specifications ==
Data from Jane's All the World's Aircraft 1973-74.

General characteristics

- Crew: 1
- Length: 3.94 m (12 ft 11.75 in)
- Wingspan: 12.60 m (41 ft 4 in)
- Height: 2.08 m (6 ft 9.75 in)
- Wing area: 13.2 m^{2} (142 sq ft)
- Aspect ratio: 12.1
- Empty weight: 250 kg (551 lb)
- Gross weight: 360 kg (793 lb)
- Powerplant: 1 × Solo-Hirth engine , 19 kW (26 hp)

Performance

- Maximum speed: 200 km/h (124 mph, 108 kn)
- Stall speed: 75 km/h (47 mph, 41 kn)
- Maximum glide ratio: 24
- Rate of sink: 1.0 m/s (200 ft/min)

== See also ==
Related lists

- List of gliders
