= Markus Kemmelmeier =

German social psychologist

- Citizenship: German
- Education: Universitaet Mannheim (Diplom, 1994); University of Michigan (M.A., 1997; Ph.D., 2001)
- Known for: Political psychology Cultural psychology
- Awards: Foundation Professor, University of Nevada, Reno, 2021
- Scientific career
- Fields: Social psychology
- Workplaces: University of Nevada, Reno
- Thesis: Motivated racial cognition: Power and implicit goals to affirm or attenuate social hierarchy (2001)
- Doctoral advisor: Eugene Burnstein

Markus Kemmelmeier is a German social psychologist at the University of Nevada, Reno, where he is a foundation professor and director of the Ph.D. program in interdisciplinary social psychology.

== Career ==
He is known for his research on the psychological effects of exposure to flags, such as the American flag. He has also researched the relationship between political ideology and intelligence.
