= Theologia mythologica =

1532 book by Georg Pictorius

Theologia mythologica is a 1532 book by Georg Pictorius. It was one of the first treatises of Classical mythology in the German Renaissance. Pictorius interprets the Greek pantheon as allegory, e.g. Cybele as the Earth, her chariot wheels as symbolizing the rotation of the Earth.

== Editions ==
- Theologia mythologica ex doctiss. uirorum promptuario, labore Pictorij Vill. in compendium congesta. : Videlicet De nominum deorum gentilium ratione. De imaginibus, aut formis, insignibusque eorundem et omnium imaginum explanationes allegoricæ, Antwerp, Michiel Hillen van Hoochstraten (1532)
- Theologia mythologica : videlicet de nominum deorum gentilium ratione, de imaginibus aut formis, insignibusque eorundem, et omnium imaginum explanationes allegoricae, Franeker, J. Horreus (1696).
