= Georg Pictorius =

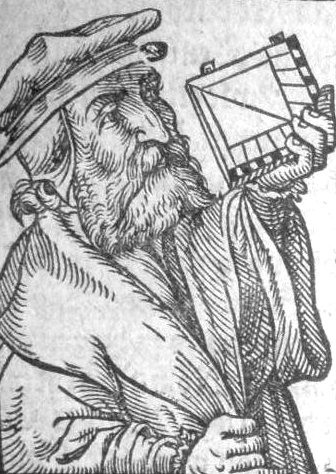
Georg Pictorius

Georg Pictorius of Villingen (c. 1500 – 1569) was a physician and an author of the German Renaissance.

He became active as a physician from 1540 in Ensisheim. In his book on magic, he condemns witchcraft, endorsing the witch-trials of his time: "if the witches are not burned, the number of these furies swells up in such an immense sea that no one could live safe from their spells and charms." (Midelfort p. 59) His gynecological Frauenzimmer gives cosmetic advice for women, from the suppression of unpleasant scents to the shaping of their bosom (Walter, p. 372f.)

works:

- 1532 Theologia mythologica
- Isagoge, the fourth book in the collection published as the Fourth Book of Occult Philosophy by Henry Cornelius Agrippa
- 1555 Lasz Büchlin, on bloodletting
- 1560 Baderbüchlin, on balneotherapy
- Von den Gattungen der Ceremonialmagie (Goetie) (Eng. Of the Kinds of Ceremonial Magic (Goetia)), ed. Das Kloster (1846)

== See also ==
- Johann Weyer
