= Castrum Novum =

Ancient Roman town

Coordinates: 42.0371178°N 11.8338331°E

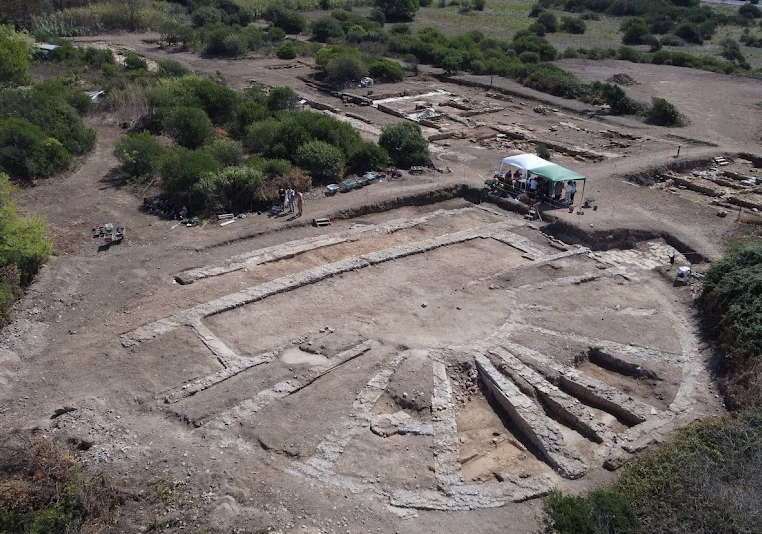
the theatre after the 2021 excavation campaign

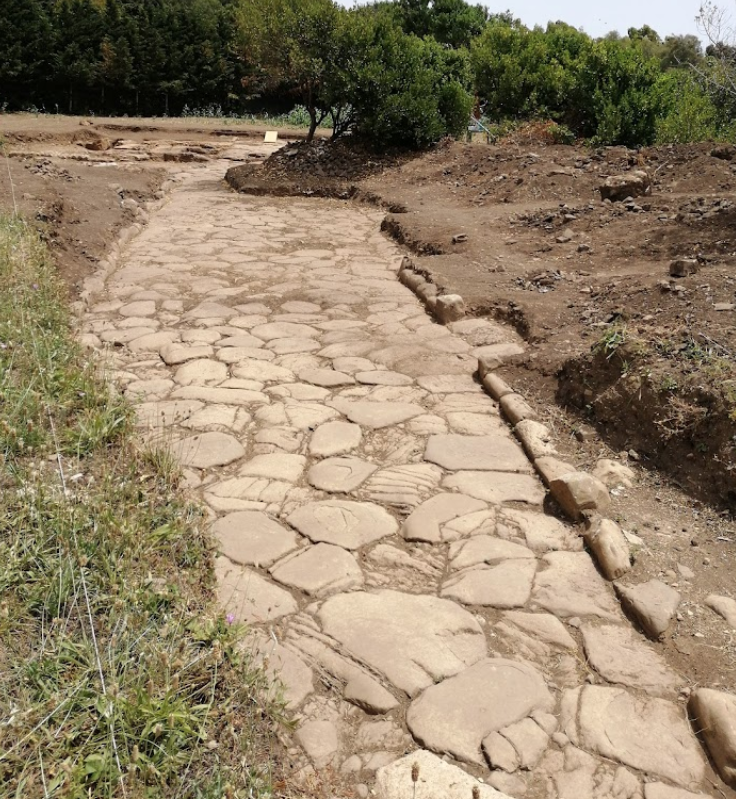
the Decumanus

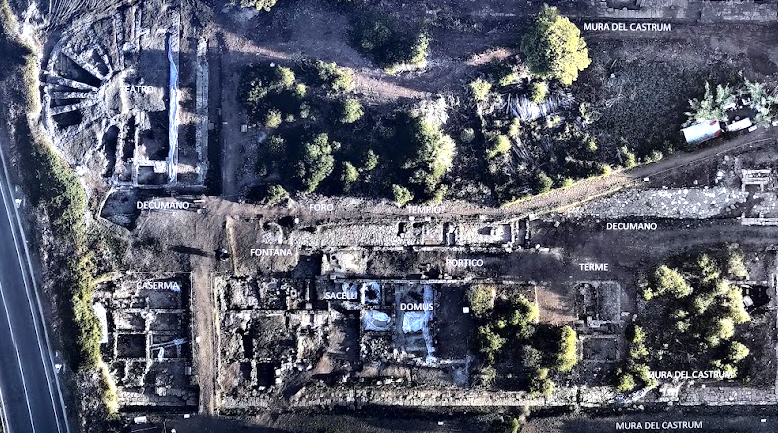
perimeter of the castrum, with the main buildings

Castrum Novum (new fort) was an ancient Roman town now located in the municipality of Santa Marinella, to the north of Cape Linaro, ca. 60 km north-west of Rome Italy. It is located near Mount Guardiole, 1.5 km from the coast, where an Etruscan settlement was found.

Its location was known since the 16th century and confirmed by the excavations carried out between the late-18th and the 19th century. Since 2010, archaeological investigation was resumed by the Gruppo Archeologico del Territorio Cerite (GATC) which shed new light on the topography and the history of the site.

== History ==
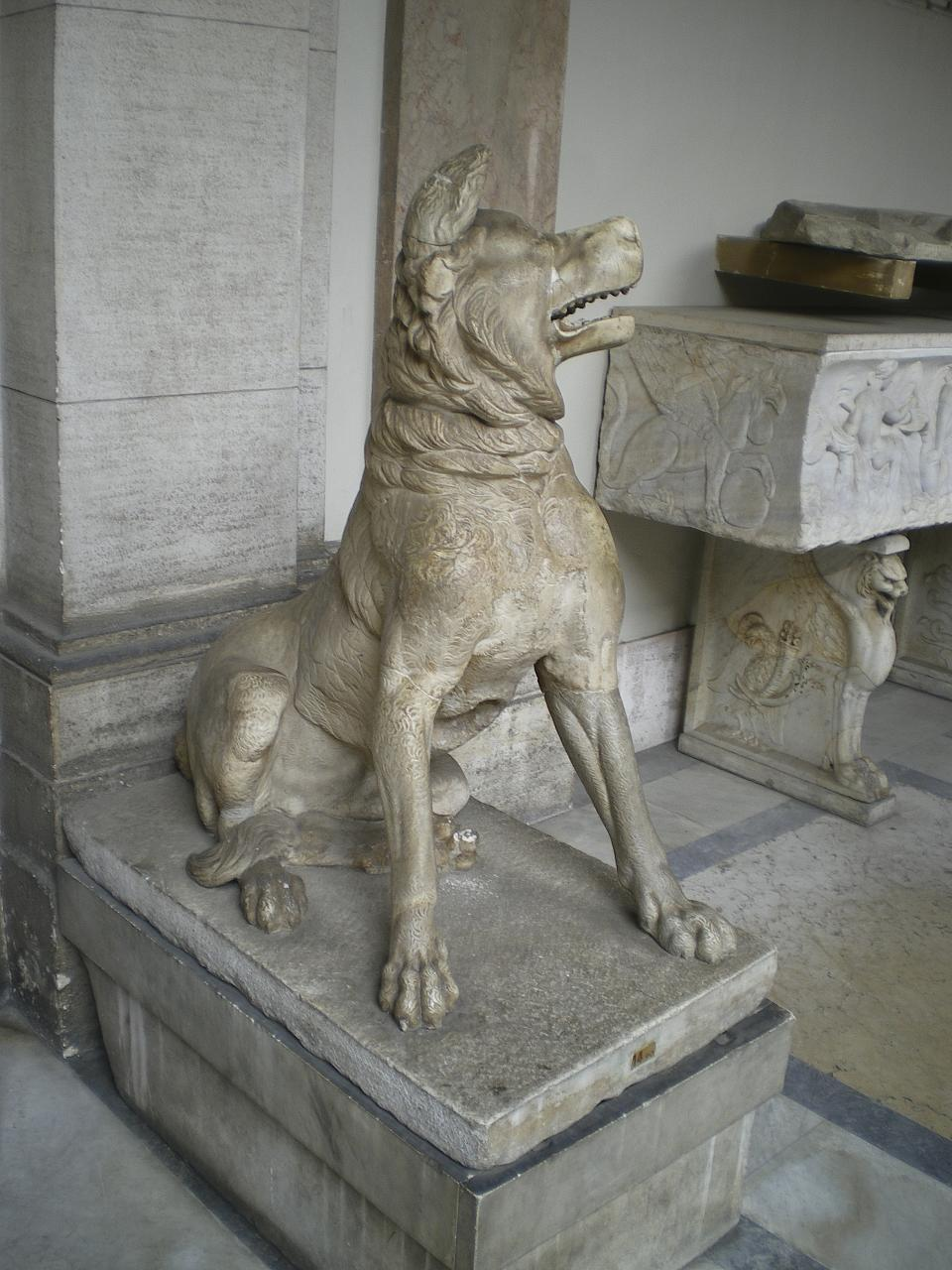
Dog from Castrum Novum (Vatican Museum)

Finds from the Iron Age (9th century BC) and from the archaic Etruscan period show their presence in the area prior to the Roman colony. The anchorage was already active in Etruscan times.

It was founded as a colony in about 264 BC probably superimposed on an Etruscan settlement along with nearby Pyrgi and other coastal colonies in defense of the northern coast of the territory of Caere. The town had originally a rectangular plan in the form of a castrum (fort) of 120 x 63 m, surrounded by walls as its name suggests. Since the 3rd century BC the colony was charged with protecting the coastal waters, as did Pyrgi and Gravisca. A small harbour nearby would have held a few ships.

During the first years the inhabitants of Castrum Novum had plots of land of modest size (compared to Terracina, for example) as the plots were only 2 iugera, i.e. half a hectare, which suggests that they were poor Romans attracted by the idea of owning some land.

The Via Aurelia was constructed in approximately 241 BC to serve the needs of Roman expansion, including swift army movements and quicker communication with Roman colonies and allowed Castrum Novum to become well connected to Rome and to the two military colonies of Cosa and Pyrgi.

On several occasions, the colony had to protest against Rome's will to take away some privileges. However, in 207 BC, it does not appear among the colonies that sent delegates to Rome to defend their military exemption after Hasdrubal's invasion. But in 191 BC it took part in the revolt against the praetor Gaius Livy, who intended to impose naval levies on the maritime colonies when Rome needed soldiers for the Roman–Seleucid War.

It was re-colonised perhaps under Caesar as Colonia Iulia Castronovo(rum) from inscriptions. This brought new wealth to the settlement as gold coins dating from Nero to Marcus Aurelius indicate.

In the imperial era it grew into a town with a theatre, a curia, an archive (tabularium), an altar sacred to Apollo and an aqueduct, as inscriptions show. Probably in the Augustan age, L. Ateius Capitus had the curia and the tabularium restored, donating the theatre and its arcades to the city.

From inscriptions found in Santa Marinella we know of the existence of decuriones (members of the colony's senate), duumviri quinquennales (supreme magistrates of the city), Augustales (priests of the imperial cult), magistri vici (local administrators). Inscriptions inform about the foundation of public buildings by the Statilii and Ateii families: a porticus, theatre and a temple.

From the Republican age magnificent seaside villas were built nearby along the coast by patricians from Rome. Their most recent construction phases are from the Severan dynasty at the beginning of the 3rd century AD.

== The Site ==
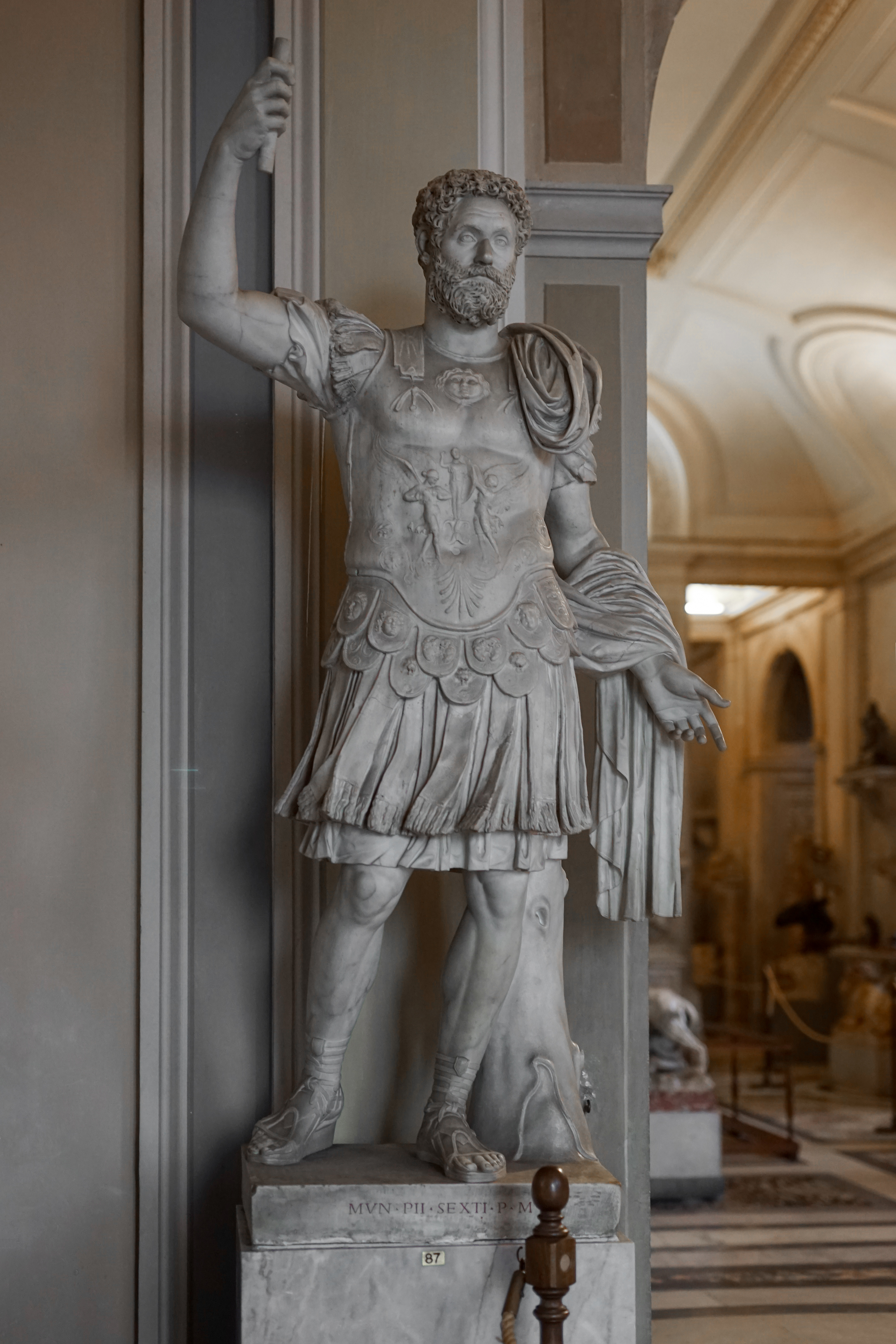
Clodius Albinus, I-II c. AD with non-original head (Vatican museum)

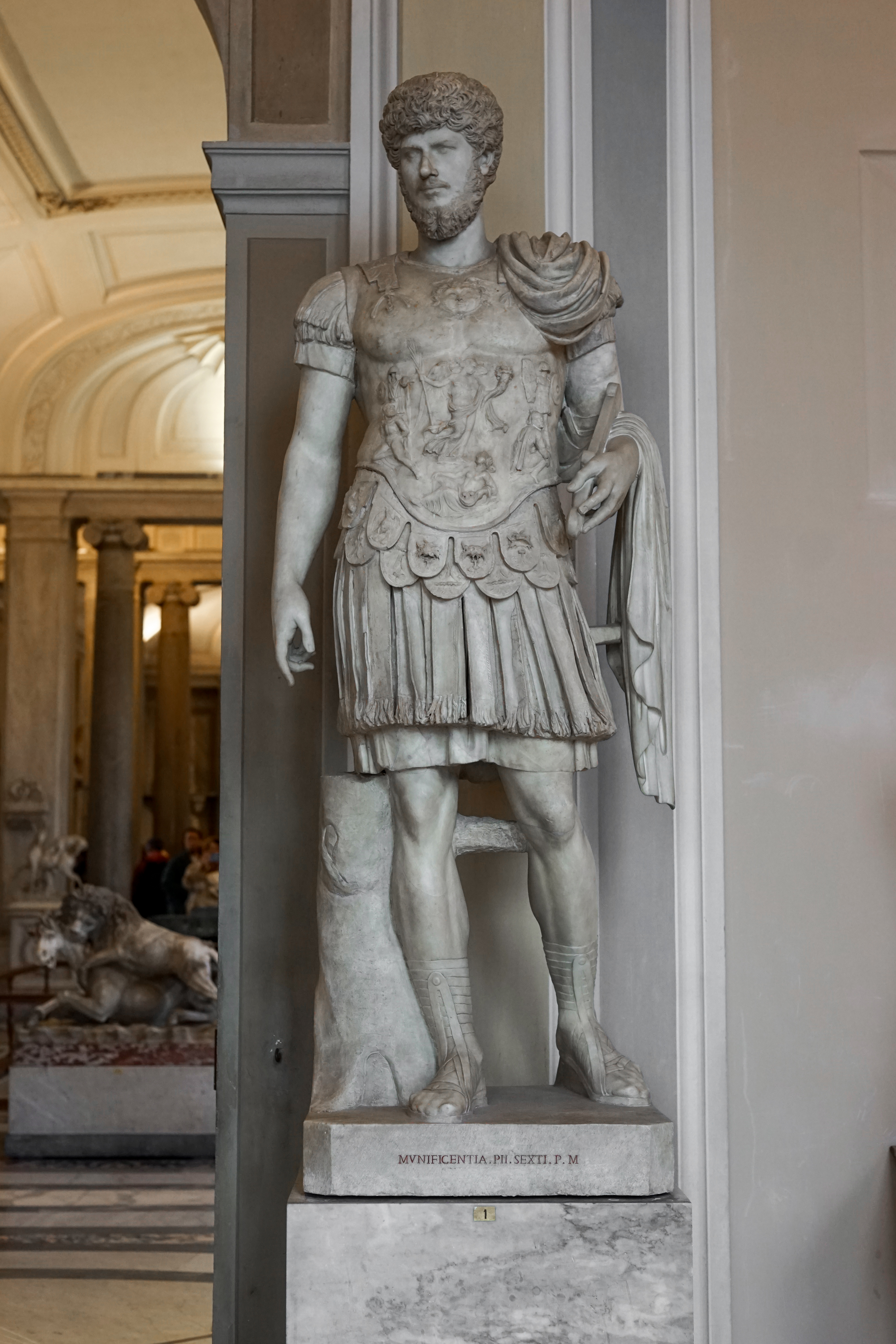
Lucius Verus, I-II c. AD with non-original head (Vatican museum)

Over the last three centuries a large number of architectural and sculptural fragments have been found including a herm of veiled Aspasia, statues of emperors, a small statue of Bacchus, a statue of a lying mastiff dog; of exceptional interest was the discovery in 1778 of a casket containing 122 gold coins dating back to the 1st and 2nd century AD.

Numerous wall structures, marble mosaic floors, basins and colonnades from the imperial phase have been found recently. Masonry in opus reticulatum and brick, floors and sewers are visible in land exposed by erosion along the beach, for a long stretch below the modern stilt houses.

In 2022 a large and elegant theatre from the Imperial age which overlooked on the Tyrrhenian Sea was uncovered.

== Villa delle Guardiole ==
Near the site of Castrum Novum at km 64.6 of the Via Aurelia are the remains of a baths and other interesting structures of a Roman maritime villa. It is equipped with a remarkable complex of fishponds which extend along the coast line for almost 400 m. The largest fishpond is formed by a single rectangular basin with the side facing the sea curved to form a semicircle. The whole complex is today almost completely submerged and therefore visible only from an aerial view.

The villa opened directly onto the Via Aurelia, which at this point was 5.3 m wide. Recent excavations have brought to light room from two main construction phases, i.e. the end of the 1st and the beginning of the 2nd century AD, One room still retains traces of a mosaic floor of black and white tesserae.

== Fishtanks of Punta della Vipera ==
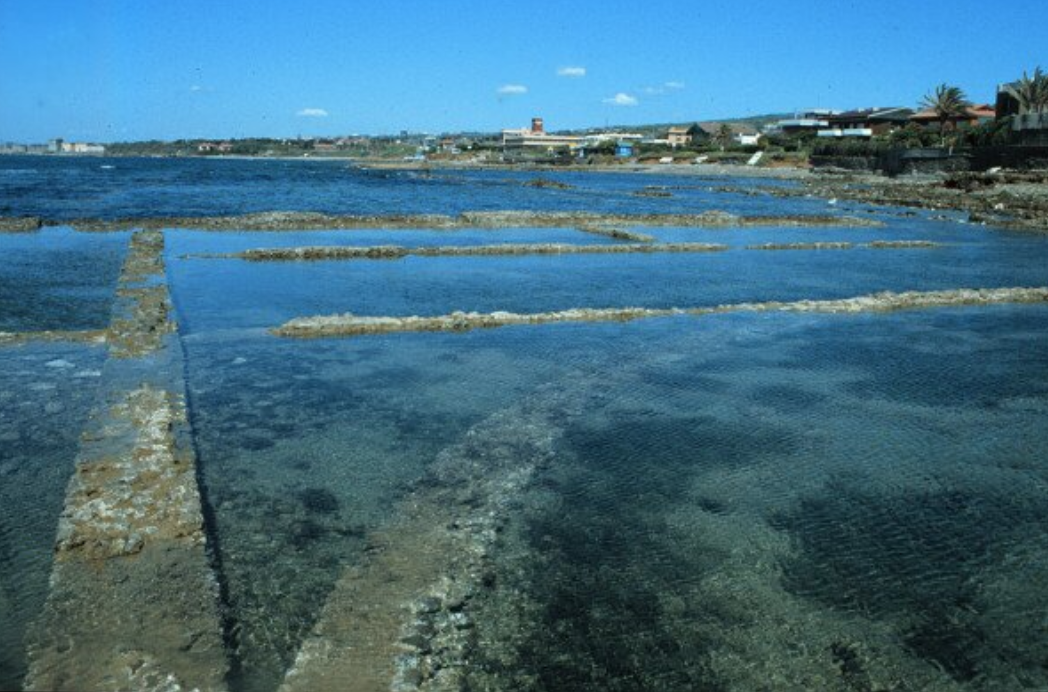
Fishtanks of Punta della Vipera

At km 66 on the Via Aurelia at Punta della Vipera, large, partially submerged fishtanks can be seen, in good condition, built on stone banks outcropping from the sea. It is one of the most complete and interesting examples of a Roman fishtanks along the entire Tyrrhenian coast north of Rome. A remarkable rectangular basin, 48 m long and 30 m wide, was protected from the sea by a breakwater in opus caementicium consisting of three orthogonal arms about 3 m thick. It is similar to the types described by ancient authors in particular by Columella and was part of an adjacent seaside villa. Several walls in opus mixtum and brick, traces of mosaic floors, capitals and marble decorations document the richness and extension of the villa connected to the ancient Via Aurelia and overlooking the fishtank below. In the basement of the private villa Galliano (510 and 512 via Aurelia) are remains of baths with hypocausts.

Intended for fish and shellfish farming and probably built at the end of the 1st century BC, the fishponds are divided into several rectangular tanks distributed around a large central circular basin of over 20 m in diameter. The mighty structure is built in cement with facings almost all in opus reticulatum with the exception of the arches connecting the tanks and the external wall of the central tank built in bricks. The internal depth of the tanks today reaches 2 m in some points, but probably would have been greater.

There are also traces of the openings and of the hydraulic devices which distributed the water in the farm and regulated its outflow. Three long submarine channels that extend from the side facing the sea ensured the water supply to the tanks, the constant purification of the water and the equilibrium of the temperature of the tanks. Towards the land, between the rocks of the coast, two symmetrical pockets branch off from the upper eastern corners of the fish tanks, perhaps for use by Moray Eels.
