= Santa Severa =

Subdivision of Saint Marinella, Italy

Coordinates: 42°02′N 11°57′E

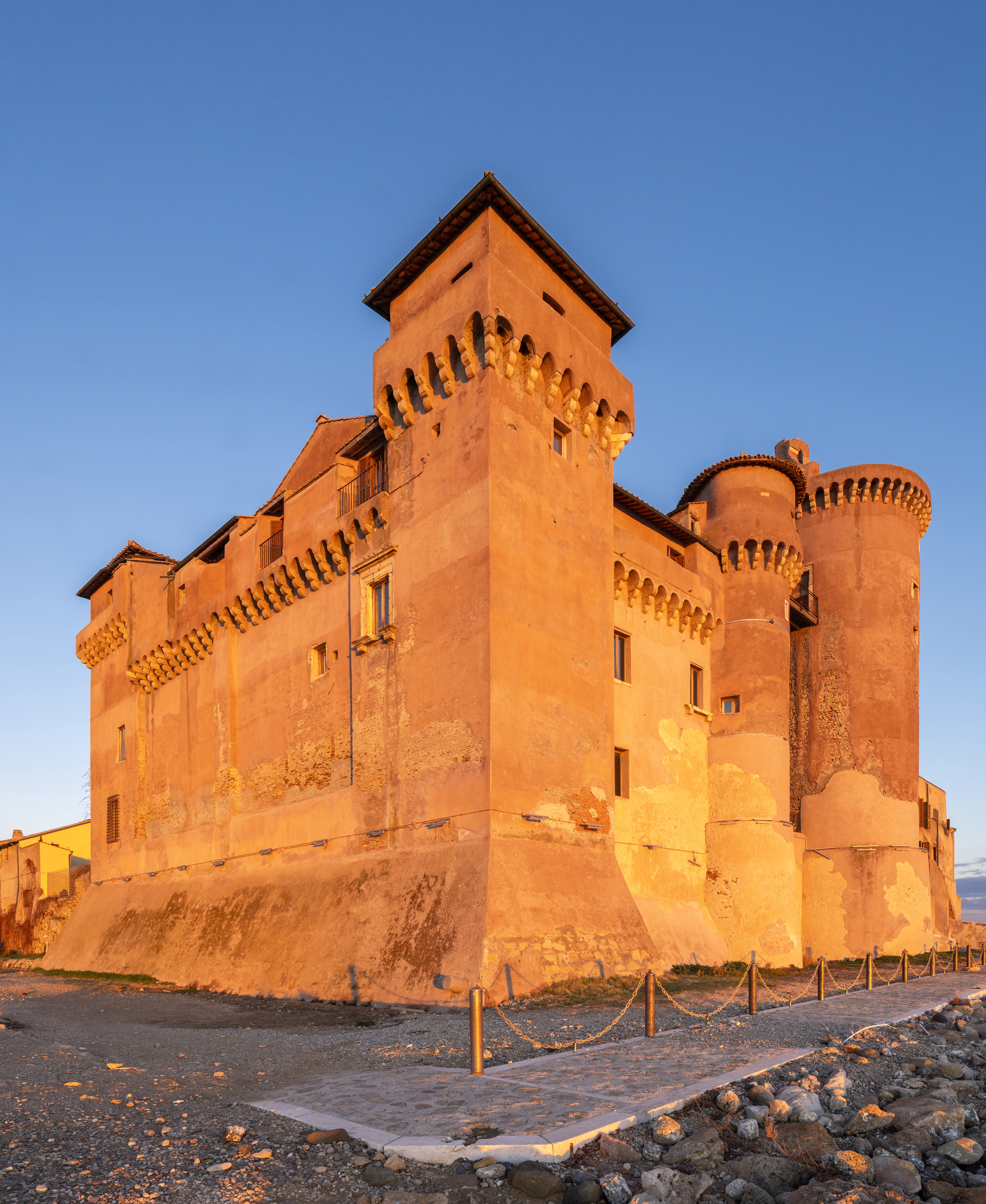
Castle of Santa Severa.

Santa Severa is a frazione of the comune of Santa Marinella, in the province of Rome, Lazio, Italy. It is a small sea resort on the Via Aurelia, c. 8 km (5 mi) south of Santa Marinella and 50 km (31 mi) north of Rome.

It takes its name from the 2nd-century Christian martyr. The village includes a small medieval town with a 9th-century castle facing the sea, where the ancient Etruscan port of Pyrgi was once located. The Pyrgi Tablets were found here in 1964.

== Filmography ==
- Medici: Masters of Florence TV series (S1E01).
- Three Steps Over Heaven.
- Salvo D'Acquisto.
