= Valeriia Sviridova =

Russian former artistic gymnast

- Full name: Valeriia Evgenievna Sviridova
- Born: 10 October 1994 (age 31) Novosibirsk, Russia

Gymnastics career
- Discipline: Women's artistic gymnastics
- Country represented: Russia; (2005–2010)
- Club: Dynamo
- Head coaches: Mikhail Kozirov, Svetlana Krepkaya, Viktor Bonet, Marina Murovannaya

Valeriia Evgenievna Sviridova (Russian: Валерия Евгеньевна Свиридова; born 10 October 1994) is a Russian former artistic gymnast. She competed for the Russian national team at national and international competitions in the 2000s and held the title of Master of Sports of Russia.

== Biography ==
Sviridova began training in gymnastics in 1999 under the guidance of Mikhail Kozirov and Svetlana Krepkaya.

She was a member of the Russian national artistic gymnastics team and competed in women's all-around for the Dynamo club of Novosibirsk, Novosibirsk Oblast, under coaches Mikhail Kozirov, Svetlana Krepkaya, Viktor Bonet and Marina Murovannaya. She held the title of Master of Sports of Russia. Regional sports media described her as a candidate for the Russian team at the 2012 Summer Olympics in London and as an Olympic hope for Novosibirsk gymnastics.

== Career ==
=== 2004–2008 ===
From 2004 to 2008, Sviridova competed at the Russian National Championships and the International Voronin Cup, winning multiple medals in competitions.

In 2008, she took part in the IV International Sports Games "Children of Asia" held in Yakutsk, where she won the all-around, uneven bars and floor exercise titles in artistic gymnastics representing the Novosibirsk Region team.

In the same year, at the all-Russian tournament on the prizes of Olympic champion Yevgeny Podgorniy in Novosibirsk, she won the all-around and all four apparatus finals among candidates for master of sport; Podgorniy described her as one of the main hopes of Novosibirsk gymnastics.

=== 2009 ===
At the Russia–China Youth Games held in Beijing in 2009, Sviridova won first place on floor exercise and vault and placed third in the all-around behind Chinese gymnasts.

At the Russian Cup, she scored 52.5 points in the all-around, finishing among the top ten gymnasts in the competition. In the individual apparatus finals, she placed fourth on floor exercise, fifth on uneven bars, and seventh in the all-around.

Competing as part of the Russian women’s team, Sviridova won a team silver medal at the 2nd Memorial Mikhail Klimenko in Santa Marinella, Italy, scoring 54 points in the all-around.

Later in 2009, at the all-Russian tournament on the prizes of Olympic champion Yevgeny Podgorniy held in Novosibirsk, Sviridova won the all-around and all apparatus finals, taking five gold medals.

She was also a member of the Russian team that won the women's artistic gymnastics competition at the Gymnasiade in Doha, Qatar.

=== 2010 ===
In 2010, Sviridova competed at the sixth all-Russian tournament on the prizes of Olympic champion Yevgeny Podgorniy in Novosibirsk, where she won the women's all-around in the masters of sport category.

That same year she also took part in training camps in Blagoveshchensk, Amur Oblast, where she accompanied coach Mikhail Kozirov and demonstrated routines as a member of the Russian national team during sessions with local young gymnasts. She later retired from competitive gymnastics.
