= Santa Marinella =

- Comune
- Comune di Santa Marinella
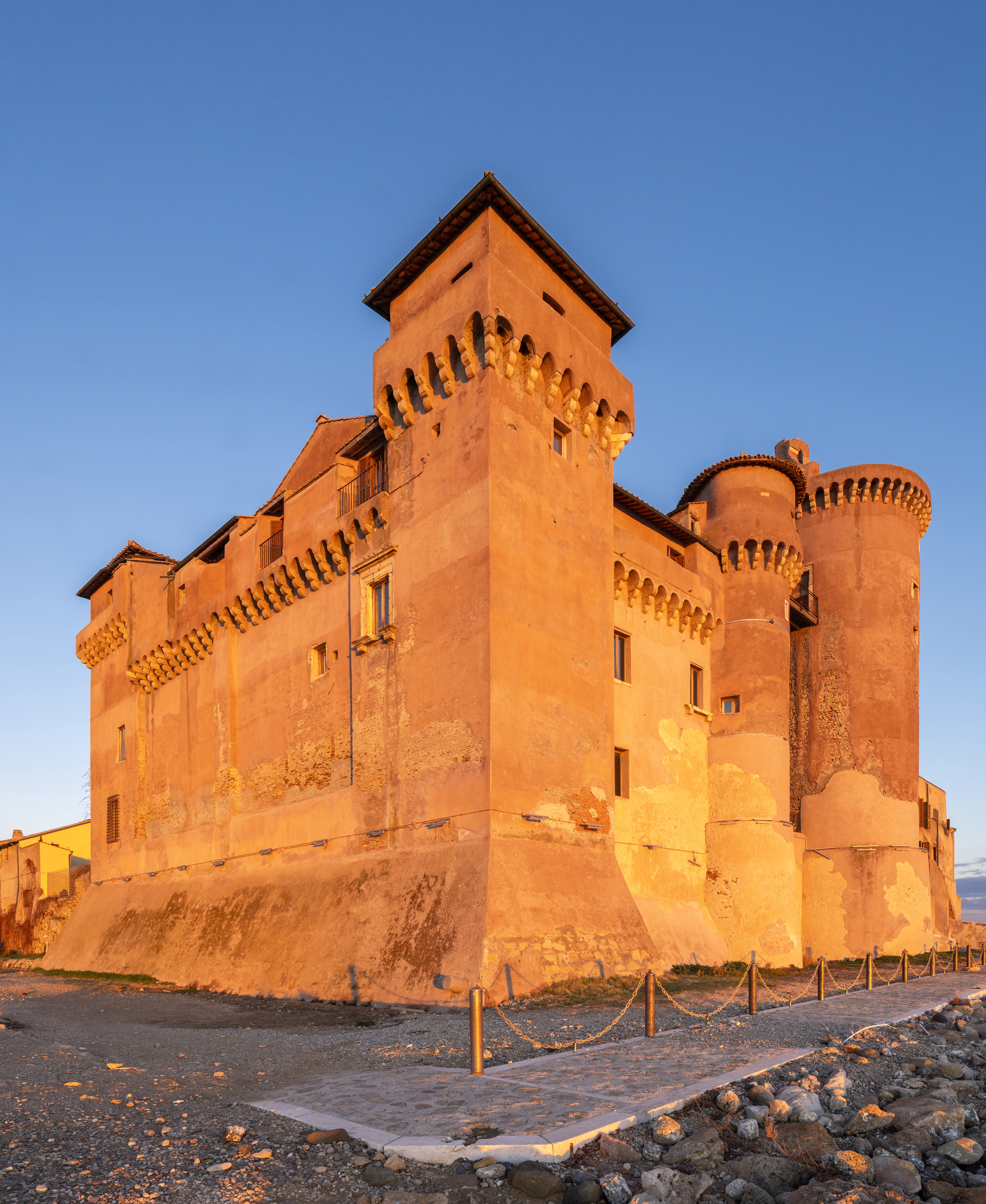
- The Severa Castle

- Coat of arms

- Location within Italy Location within Lazio
- Coordinates: 42°2′N 11°51′E
- Country: Italy
- Region: Lazio
- Metropolitan city: Rome (RM)
- Frazioni: Santa Severa

Area
  - Total: 49.2 km^{2} (19.0 sq mi)
- Elevation: 7 m (23 ft)

Population (2018-01-01)
  - Total: 18,921
  - Density: 385/km^{2} (996/sq mi)
- Time zone: UTC+1 (CET)
  - Summer (DST): UTC+2 (CEST)
- Patron saint: Saint Joseph
- Saint day: March 19
- Website: Official website

Santa Marinella is a comune (municipality) in the Metropolitan City of Rome Capital, in the Italian region of Lazio, located about 60 kilometres (37 mi) northwest of Rome.

It includes the beach resort of Santa Severa (the ancient Pyrgi), and a medieval castle.

== History ==
In antiquity, Santa Marinella was the site of Punicum, an important Etruscan port which served the city of Caere. Punicum was identified in the Peutinger Table, in which it is on the Via Aurelia 9km N of Pyrgi. The area had several scattered settlements in Etruscan times. It was near an easy landing point, protected from the winds and the sea. The name Punicum is probably from the Latin name of the pomegranate (malum punicum) a plant which in ancient times was often used as a topographical reference point (ad punicum).

There was a Sanctuary of Minerva overlooking the Punto della Vipera north of S. Marinella, finds from which are in the museum.

In the suburbs to the north of Cape Linaro was the Roman town of Castrum Novum of which parts are visible in the sea and others have been recently excavated.

About 10km northeast are the remains of the baths of Aquae Caeretanae famous until the 5th century.

It became a Roman resort and site of many opulent villas under the Empire.

== Ancient monuments ==
=== Bridges ===
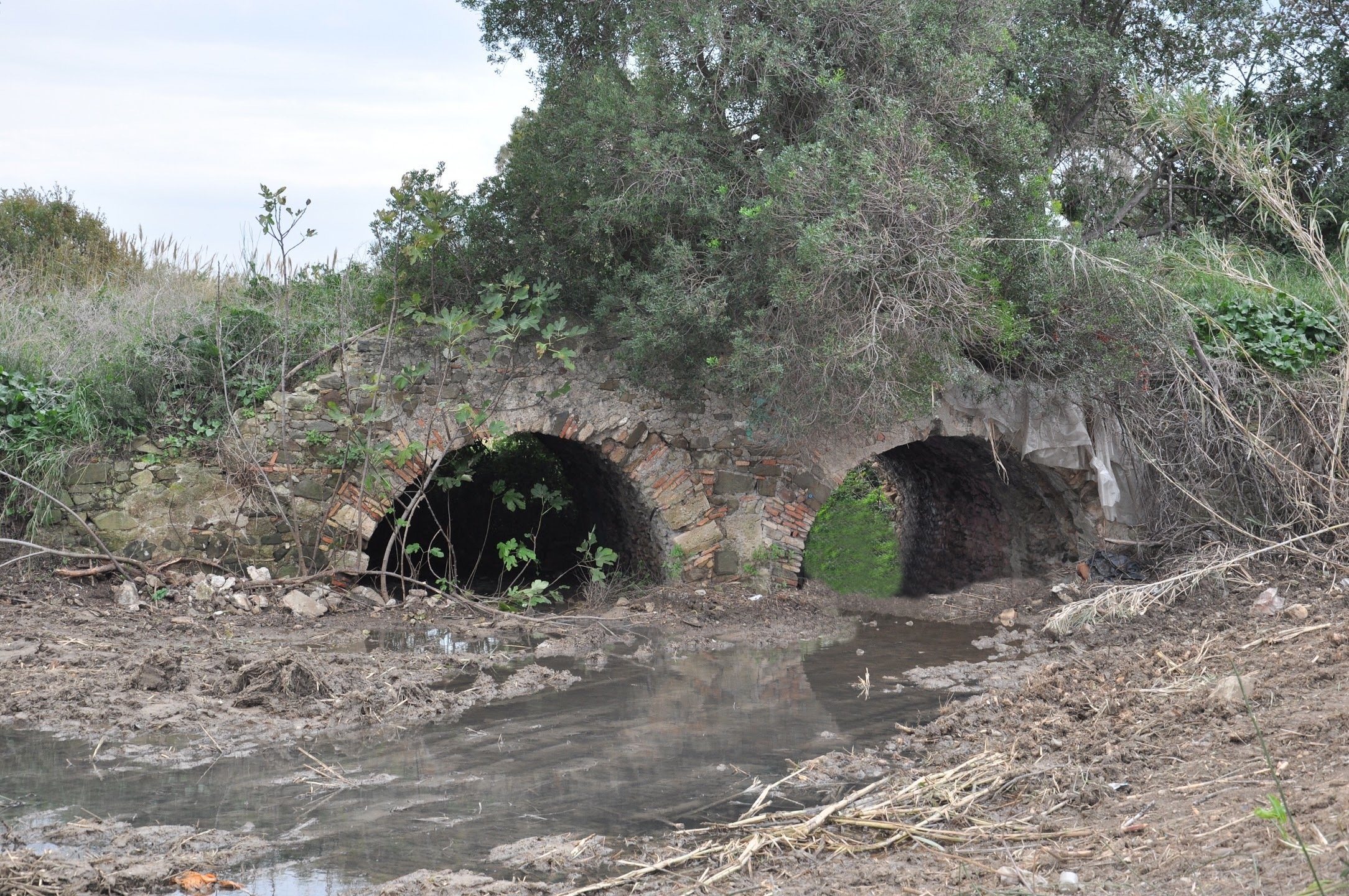
Ponte di Apollo

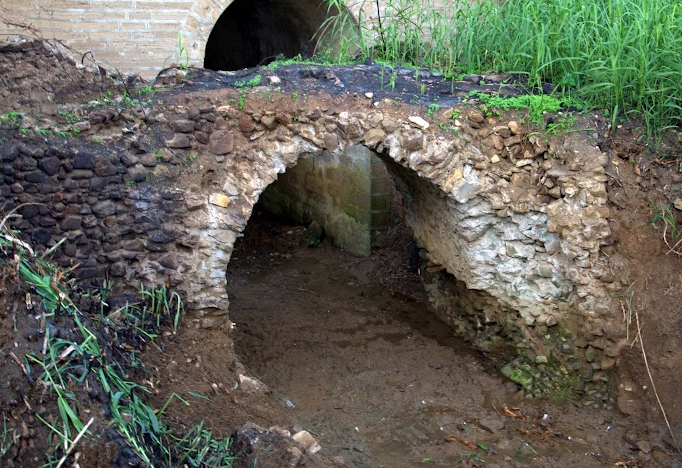
Roman bridge of the via Aurelia

Numerous Roman bridges are preserved of the ancient Via Aurelia, the famous road linking Rome, coastal Etruria and Liguria, built from the 3rd century BC based on earlier Etruscan layouts.

Of particular interest and monumentality are the Largo Impero Bridge (km 60.4 of the Via Aurelia) with an arch of 15 limestone ashlars and the Via Roma Bridge (km 60.7) with a segmental arch with 19 radial ashlars in limestone and traces of the flanking walls and cement abutments. The Ponte delle Vignacce (km 62.3) also with a single arch in sandstone ashlars is difficult to access today.

=== Villa of Ulpian ===
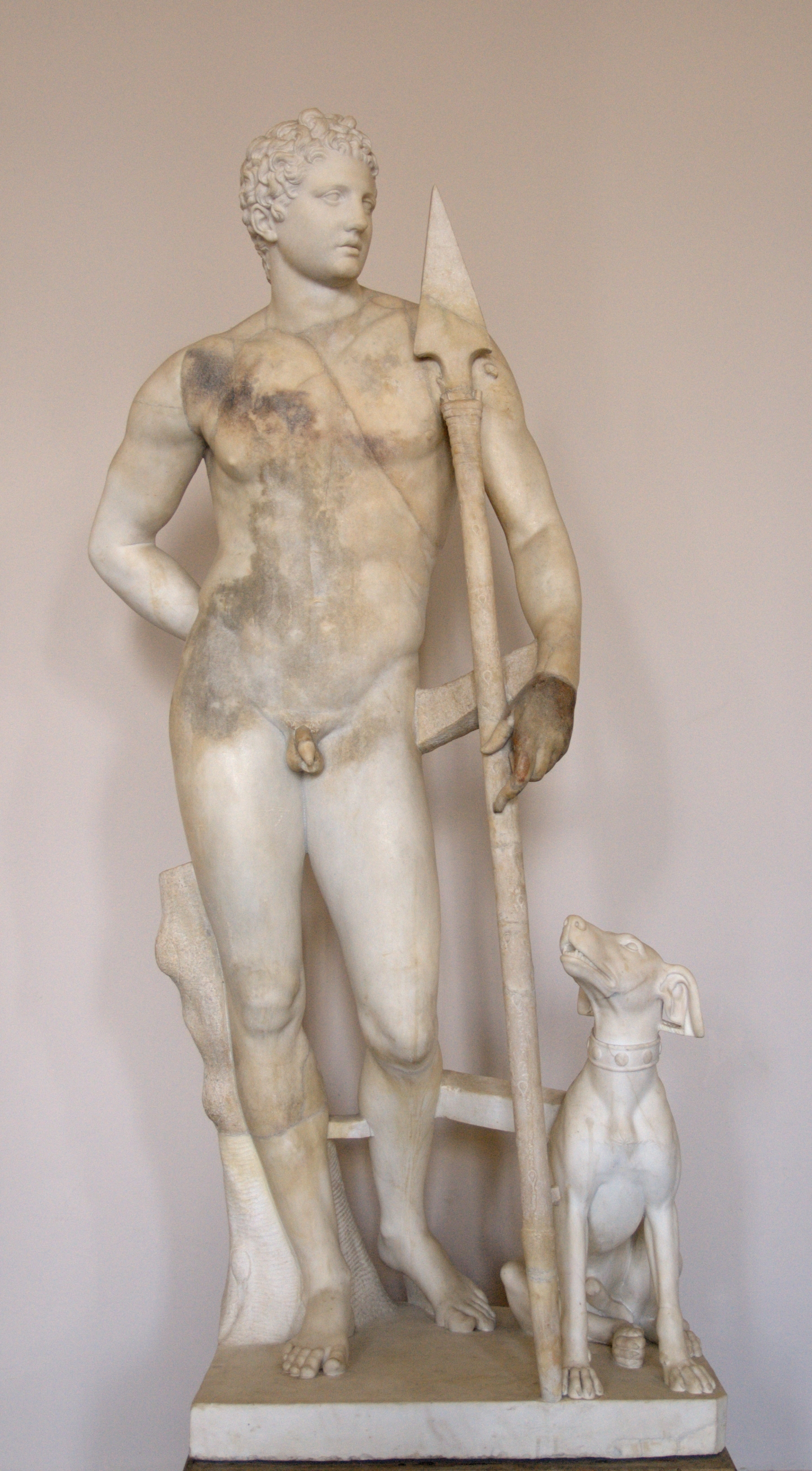
Meleager from villa of Ulpian (Antikensammlung Berlin)

A large and luxurious seaside villa called Ulpiano was built near Castello Odescalchi, equipped with a port and fish farming facilities (peschiere), acquired perhaps at the beginning of the 3rd century AD by the famous jurist Ulpian, as shown by lead pipes (fistulae) with the inscription "Cn. Domiti Anni Ulpiani".

The remains of the villa were found after numerous irregular excavations starting from 1838. The presence of cryptoporticos, porticoes open towards the sea, baths with rich mosaic decorations and statuary is known, today dispersed in various museums and private collections. Among the discoveries were the mosaic of Orpheus, the statues of Meleager and of Dionysius and Pan, and more recently the statues of Athena Parthenos and Apollo (in the Civitavecchia museum) which evidently decorated the gardens of the villa.

Currently, only a few short sections of opus reticulatum and brickwork of the terracing walls of the villa remain visible at the small port; numerous architectural fragments and some interesting sepulchral inscriptions are preserved in the gardens of Castello Odescalchi and the surrounding villas.

=== Villa delle Grottacce ===
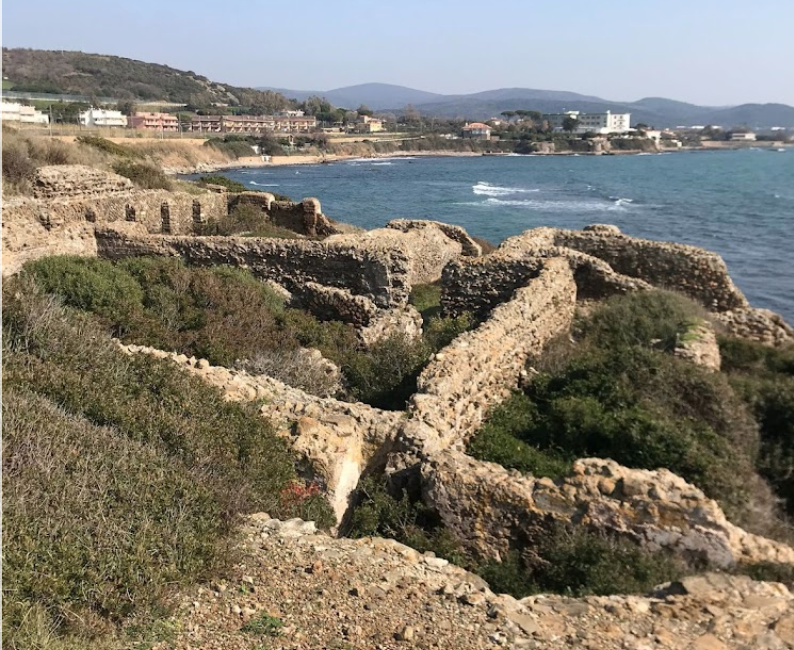
Villa delle Grottacce

At the 58.2 km of the Via Aurelia, close to the sea, lie the remains of the Villa delle Grottacce, one of the numerous maritime villas and identified with the ancient port of Panapione mentioned in many historical sources such as the Itinerarium Maritimum of the Antonine period.

The vast estate, equipped with a remarkable system for breeding fish and shellfish (peschiera) and a long pier, today almost completely submerged, was the subject of excavations and research in the last century. Since 1952 some sectors of the monument have been explored and restored by the Archaeological Superintendency for Southern Etruria.

Of great interest is the semicircular fishpond, now visible only from an aerial view and at low tide, of which two or three tanks, which have remained intact, are connected to the outside with a series of small rectangular tanks arranged in a ring communicating with each other. A bronze portcullis from this fishpond is now conserved in museum of Pyrgi.

Part of the underground rooms (corridors, warehouses, work areas and cisterns), intended to house the service rooms and part of the production activities are preserved. The ruins of the cryptoporticus and numerous barrel-vaulted rooms are visible, two of which, probable cisterns have two circular surface wells. The walls reveal a complex building history that from the 1st century BC to the 4th century AD. Ceramics recovered during the excavations document inhabitation to the 5th-6th century.

In the 1970's 3 shipwrecks were found in the harbour of Panapione below the villa. The whole port area has a very shallow seabed (1.5 - 2.5 m), muddy and covered by a considerable amount of ceramic and wall fragments which testify to the great activity of this port, connected among other things with the villa with adjoining fish pond located on the northern promontory. Of wreck A, the best preserved, numerous strakes of planking joined with the tenon and mortise system and the keelbeam with the mast are visible. The approximate dimensions of the boat are 5 m wide by 15 m long. The finds are deposited in the museum of Pyrgi.

== Climate ==
Climate data for Santa Marinella (1991–2020)
Month	Jan	Feb	Mar	Apr	May	Jun	Jul	Aug	Sep	Oct	Nov	Dec	Year
Mean daily maximum °C (°F)	13.5 (56.3)	13.8 (56.8)	15.5 (59.9)	17.8 (64.0)	21.7 (71.1)	25.4 (77.7)	28.0 (82.4)	28.6 (83.5)	25.4 (77.7)	22.0 (71.6)	18.2 (64.8)	14.7 (58.5)	20.4 (68.7)
Daily mean °C (°F)	10.5 (50.9)	10.6 (51.1)	12.2 (54.0)	14.6 (58.3)	18.4 (65.1)	22.1 (71.8)	24.7 (76.5)	25.3 (77.5)	22.1 (71.8)	19.0 (66.2)	15.2 (59.4)	11.6 (52.9)	17.2 (63.0)
Mean daily minimum °C (°F)	7.5 (45.5)	7.3 (45.1)	9.0 (48.2)	11.4 (52.5)	15.1 (59.2)	18.8 (65.8)	21.4 (70.5)	22.0 (71.6)	18.9 (66.0)	15.9 (60.6)	12.2 (54.0)	8.6 (47.5)	14.0 (57.2)
Average precipitation mm (inches)	66 (2.6)	63 (2.5)	73 (2.9)	58 (2.3)	44 (1.7)	28 (1.1)	14 (0.6)	17 (0.7)	73 (2.9)	114 (4.5)	117 (4.6)	93 (3.7)	760 (30.1)
Average precipitation days (≥ 1.0 mm)	7	6	6	6	5	3	1	2	5	7	9	8	65
Source: Climi e viaggi

== Culture ==
Actress Ingrid Bergman and director Roberto Rossellini had a villa here. The gypsy punk band, Gogol Bordello also have a song titled "Santa Marinella" on their 2005 album Gypsy Punks: Underdog World Strike about Eugene Hutz's time in Santa Marinella as he tried to gain immigration to America.

The commune is known for its "Wheels of Immigration" - a pretzel-like snack consumed by Russian Jewish immigrants who temporarily settled there in the late 1980s on their way to United States or Israel.

== Twin towns - Sister Cities ==
- Limanu, Romania

== See also ==
- Landscape with the Port of Santa Marinella
