= Aquae Caeretanae =

Coordinates: 42.0624°N 12.0077°E

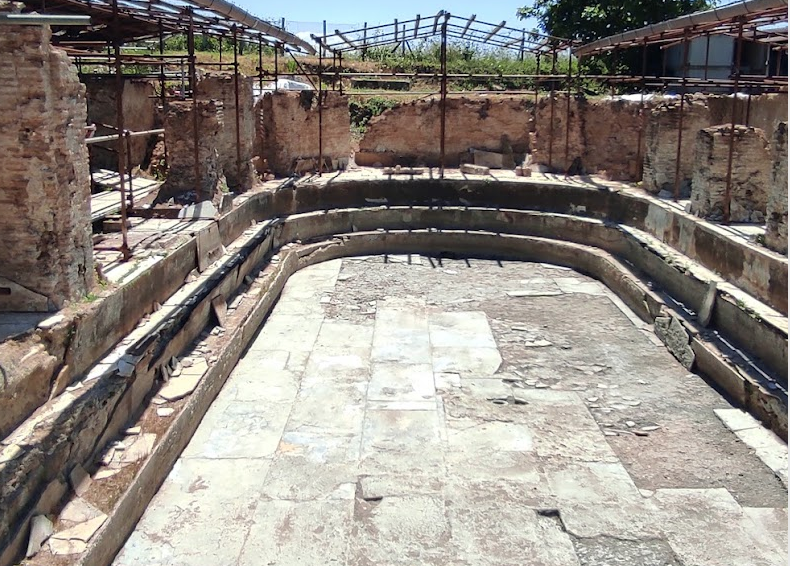
Calidarium

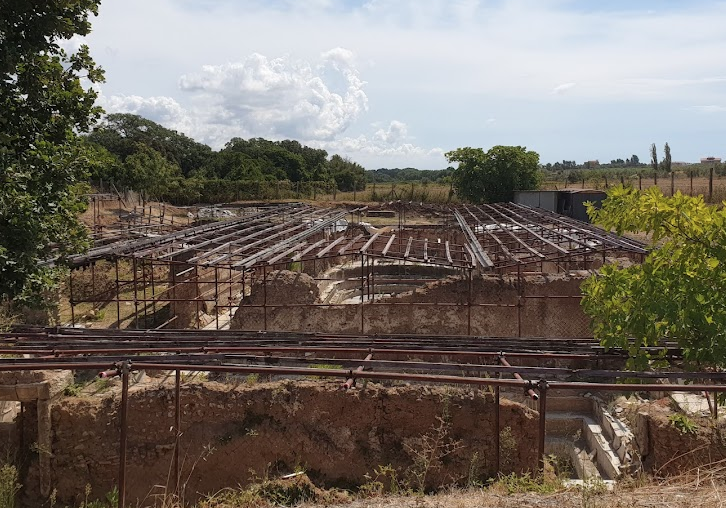
Tepidarium

Aquae Caeretanae were large and elaborate ancient Roman thermal baths at Pian della Carlotta, about 2 km north west of the village of Sasso in Lazio, Italy. They used the natural hot springs there and are located in a beautiful rural location overlooking the sea. They were in the territory of the ancient Etruscan city of Caere from which their name was derived.

They were only rediscovered in 1987. Their existence was known from Strabo (63 BC-24 AD) who wrote: "They were so famous as to be more populated than Caere itself".

Livy (59 BC-17 AD) also noted that wonders occurred during the Second Punic War which led to the red colouring of the waters of the fons Herculis at the Aquae Caeretanae as though mixed with blood.

Caelius Aurelianus, physician and supporter of hydrotherapy, wrote in the 5th century AD that they were the hottest thermal waters in Italy.

== Rediscovery ==
The site was lost despite its known exceptional dimensions and artistic level compared to known settlements in the area, although the site was searched for from the 16th century.

At the end of 1986 plowing unearthed marble, glass fragments and numerous polychrome mosaic tesserae scattered over a large area. Once research work had begun, marble thresholds were found, 5 m deep, and the remains of two large pools, those of the calidarium and tepidarium.

Identification with Aquae Caeretanae is due to the discovery of two dedications which also identify the cults associated with the complex. The first is a votive column as a base of a statue from an early imperial age with the inscription "To Jupiter and the springs of the aquae caeretanae" and not to Hercules or Apollo as one would expect, given the testimony of Livy and the classic association in Etruria between baths and the cult of Hercules.

The second dedication, on a marble table decorated with leonine protomes from no later than the middle of the first century AD, is by a certain Lucilius Pontilius and also refers to Jupiter.

A third inscription on a small marble cippus settles the problem of the cult associated with the spring (the fons) on which it states that a vow was made by those faithful to Jupiter and Hercules from the Aquae Caeretanae and therefore it verifies the religious tradition towards Hercules dating back to the Etruscan period.

== Site ==
The site extends over about 7 hectares. Today, two large rectangular rooms, the calidarium and tepidarium, are visible, both equipped with a swimming pool, the first surrounded by twelve pillars covered with marble. These were surrounded by no less than three rows of marble seats and with beautiful mosaics with blue, green, yellow, black and red glass-paste tesserae which depicted an explosion of flowers on a white field.

Along the walls were terracotta pipes that carried hot water to heat the rooms. Traces of burnt wood and various alluvial debris were signs of the destruction by the Visigoths of Alaric I and by a violent flood.

In a neighbouring sector, three other rooms have been brought to light, perhaps for female attendance.
