= Pyrgi =

Etruscan town and port in Latium

Coordinates: 42°00′54.81″N 11°57′48.29″E

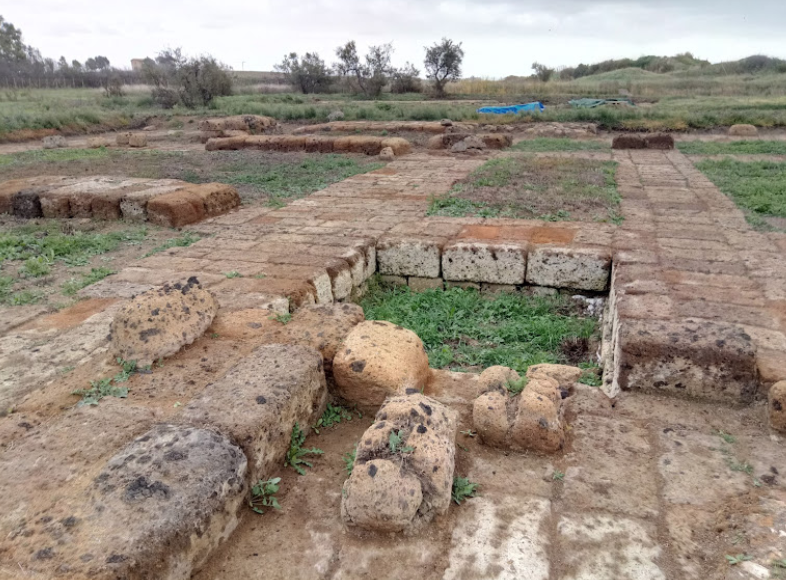
Pyrgi sanctuary

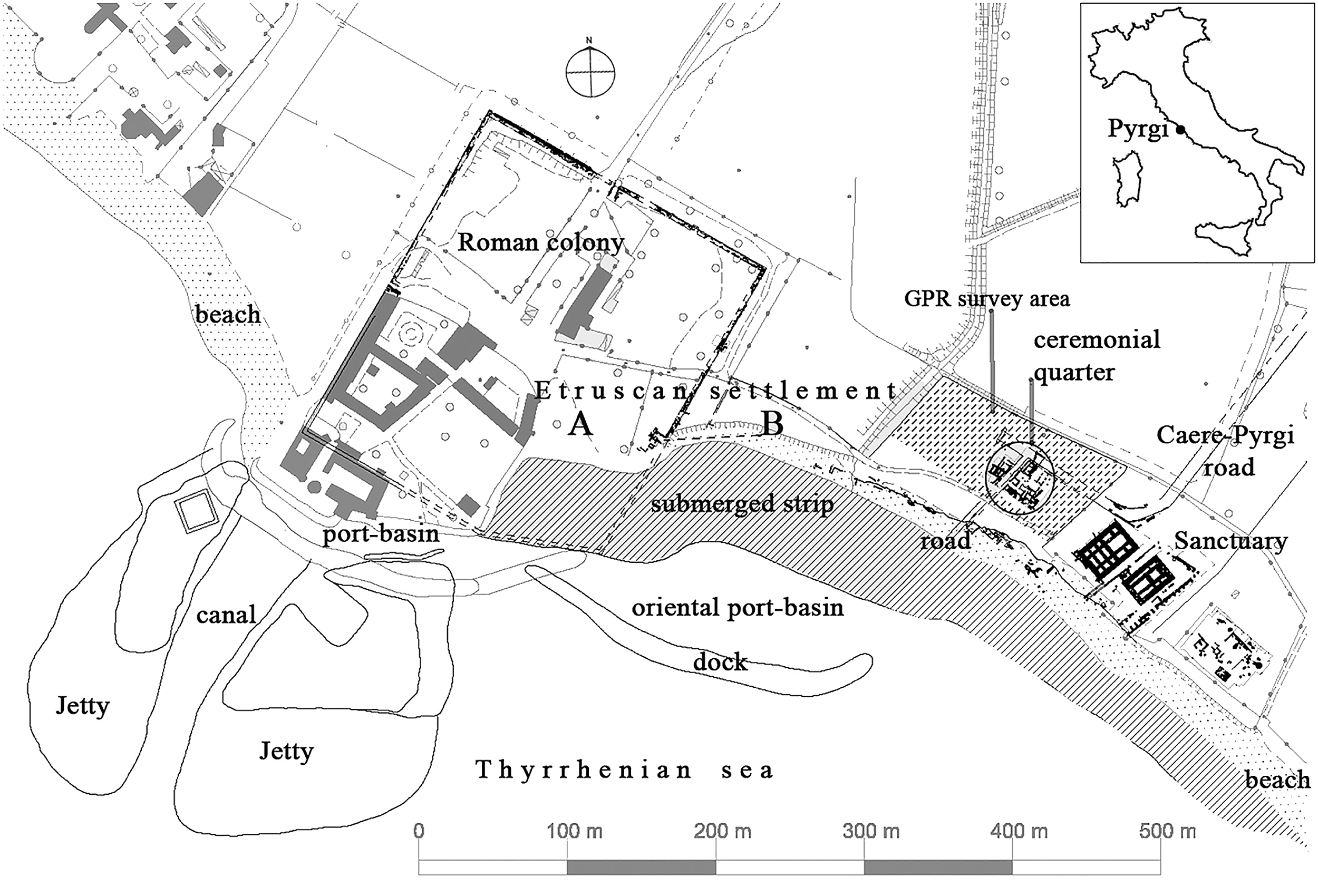
Plan of Pyrgi

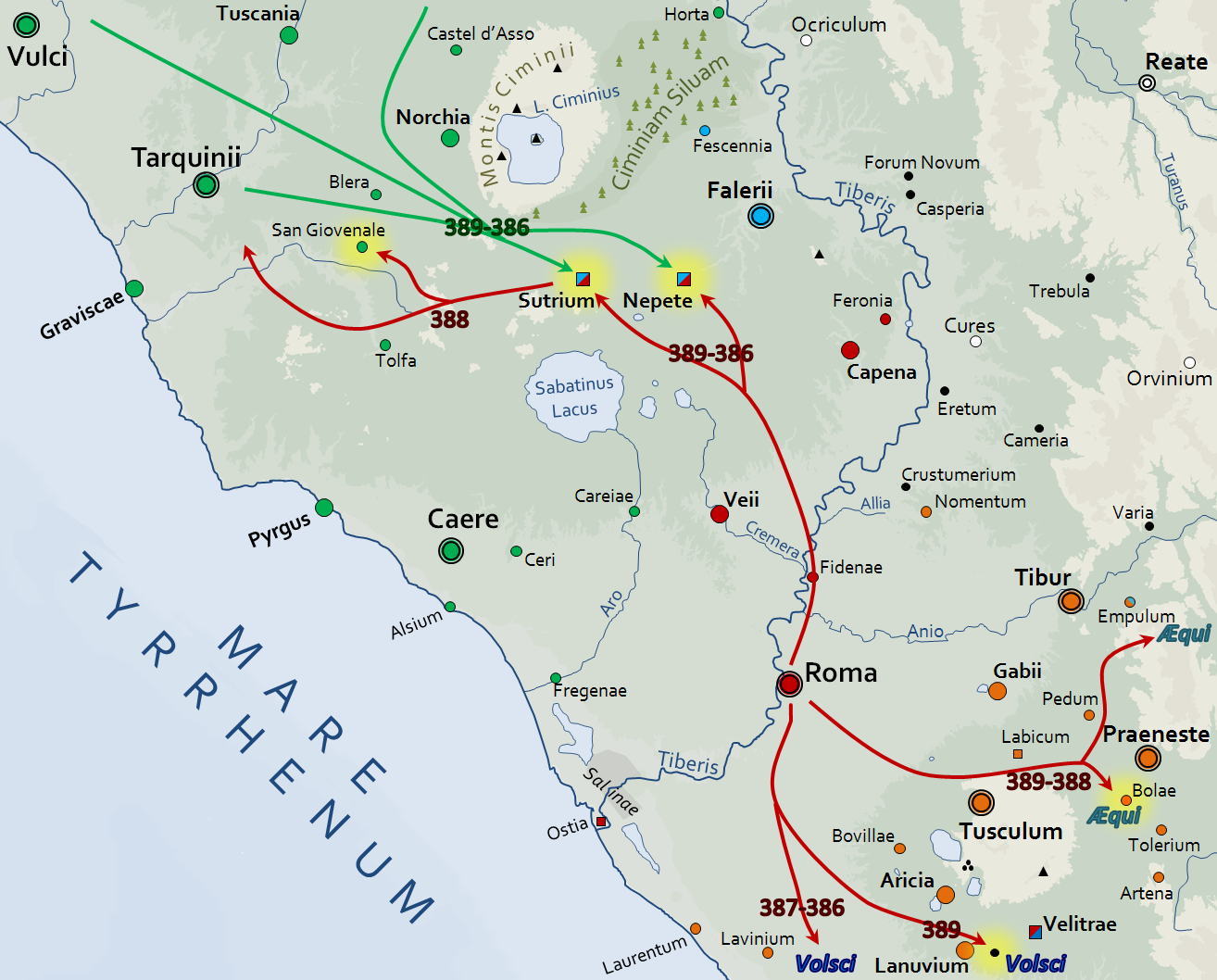
Map of Etruria and operations in the wars of 389-386 BC

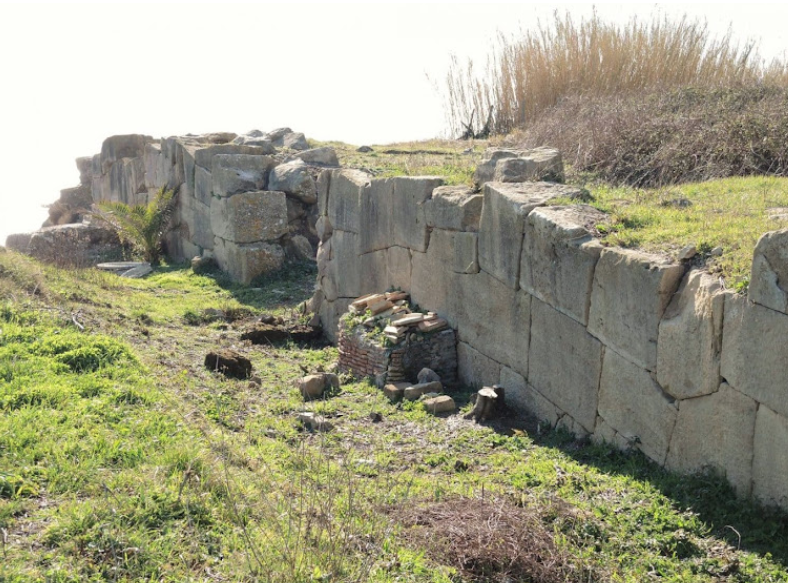
Pyrgi Etruscan walls

Pyrgi (Pyrgus) was originally an ancient Etruscan town and port in Latium, central Italy, to the north-west of Caere. Its location is now occupied by the borough of Santa Severa. It is notable for the discovery here of the gold tablets, an exceptional epigraphic document with rare texts in Phoenician and Etruscan languages, and also the exceptional terracotta pediment statues from the temple.

== Excavations ==
Excavations by Sapienza University of Rome since 1957 have focussed on the large sacred district, including the Monumental Sanctuary of Uni (Phoenician Astarte) and a Demetriac cult area, the most ancient so far known in Etruria, dedicated to the pair of deities Sur/Suri and Cavatha. In 2009 a block of ceremonial buildings north of Temple A was found.

== History ==
The foundation of the settlement was ascribed to the Pelasgi and dates from the end of the 7th century BC. The connection between the great Etruscan city of Caere and the coast was ensured by the Caere-Pyrgi road, an impressive work of engineering, 10 m wide and 12 km long, comparable to that between Athens and Piraeus. Caere had three important ports: Punicum (Santa Marinella), Pyrgi and Alsium. Pyrgi's development was closely linked to its favourable position along the Tyrrhenian shipping routes, and it became the main port of Caere and hosted its naval fleet. The abundance of imported objects in the votive deposits highlights the role of Pyrgi as a gateway to the sea under the control of Caere and its openness to international contacts with the frequentation of the area by foreign merchants.

The city was raided by Dionysius in 384 BC who, landing his troops in the night, plundered the temple of Ilithyia from which he is said to have carried off an enormous sum of 1000 talents in gold and silver.

In about 273 Caere was threatened by the Romans with war and to ensure peace it surrendered half its territory. The Romans then established a colonia maritima at Pyrgi around that time against Etruscan pirates and against potential Punic invasion. The colonia was built as a rectangular fort. At the same time the temple buildings were ritually dismantled and worship continued outdoors.

Later the town supplied fish to Rome, and became a favourite summer resort for rich patricians, as did Punicum to the north-west where there are many remains of large ancient villas. Both were stations on the Via Aurelia coast road. In 416 AD its site was occupied only by a large villa.

== The Etruscan Settlement ==
Pyrgi extended along the shore with two urban districts separated a pebbled road and each facing one of the two ports. The northern district was the arx built on the rocky promontory which was later occupied by the Roman colony. The southern district included buildings and possibly an agora bordered to the south by another wide pebbled road. Nearby, to the south of the town, was the religious sanctuary, one of the most important in Etruria visited by Greeks and Phoenicians.

Remains exist of its Etruscan defensive town walls in polygonal blocks of limestone and sandstone, neatly jointed. They enclosed a rectangular area of some 200 x 220 m. The south-west extremity has been destroyed by the sea.

=== The monumental northern sanctuary ===
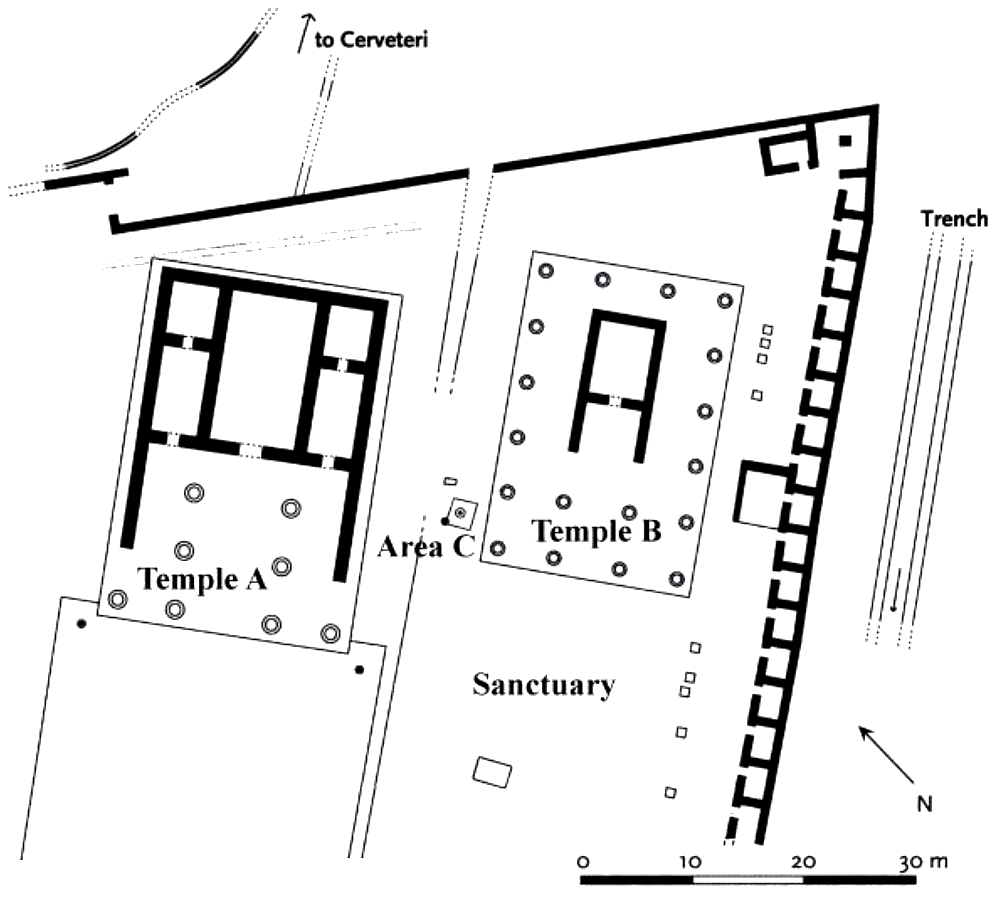
Plan of the northern sanctuary

The 1957 excavations found the remains of a large temple (temple A) with a triple-cella arrangement and with exceptional terracotta statues. The temple was later found to be within the (northern) sanctuary dedicated to Ilithyia and Cavatha (Greek Leucothea) in an area of 6,000 m^{2} bounded by a side wall and with two monumental temples, the oldest of which is “B”.

Temple B was commissioned around 510 BC by the king of Caere, Thefarie Velianas and consisted of a single cella of Greek inspiration surrounded by columns on all sides. According to the inscriptions of the gold tablets, the temple was dedicated to the Phoenician goddess Astarte (or Uni in Etruscan according to the tablets), warrior goddess and dispenser of love associated with the Greek Ilithyia. Connected with the temple was a wide building with twenty cells where the deitys' priestesses lived. The poet Lucilius referred to them as the "prostitutes of Pyrgi" (scorta Pyrgensia).

On the left of the temple a small precinct "C" with cylindrical altar contained a pit consecrated to the underworld cult of Tinia (the Etruscan version of Jupiter) who is mentioned along with Uni in one of the bronze inscriptions found in the same enclosure together with the gold sheets.

Temple A, more imposing than "B", was built around 470-460 BC also on the initiative of the City of Caere to reaffirm its dominion after being defeated by the Syracusans at Cumae in 474 BC. It was dedicated to Thesan, the Etruscan goddess of dawn, associated with Leucothea, goddess of the sea and sailors. It had an Etruscan plan with cella and alae at the back, three rows of columns at the front, and was decorated with the magnificent mythological high relief of the "Seven against Thebes" in which Tydeus devours the skull of his opponent Melanippus.

=== Temple "A" pediment ===
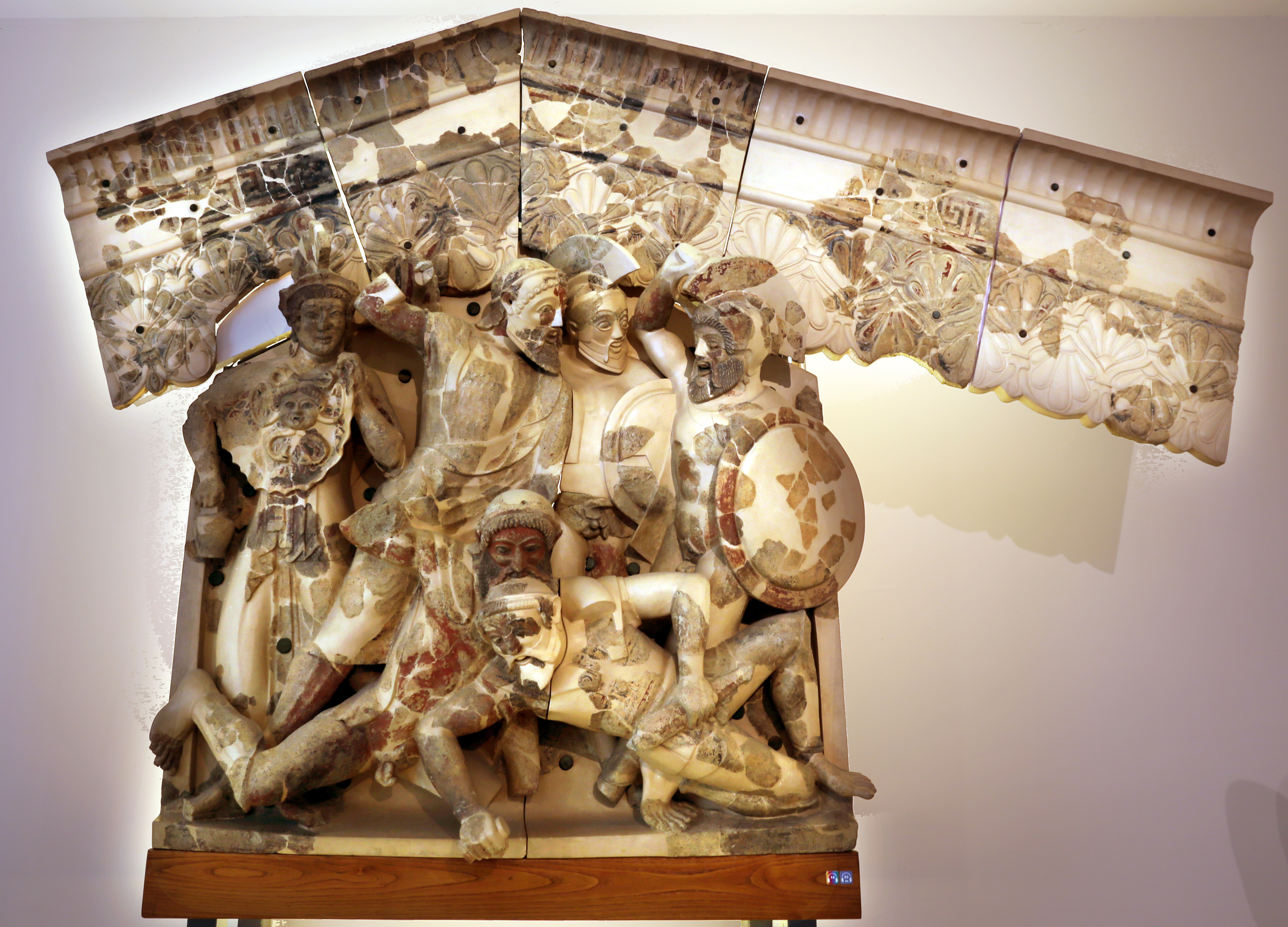
Temple "A" pediment, Etruscan museum, Rome

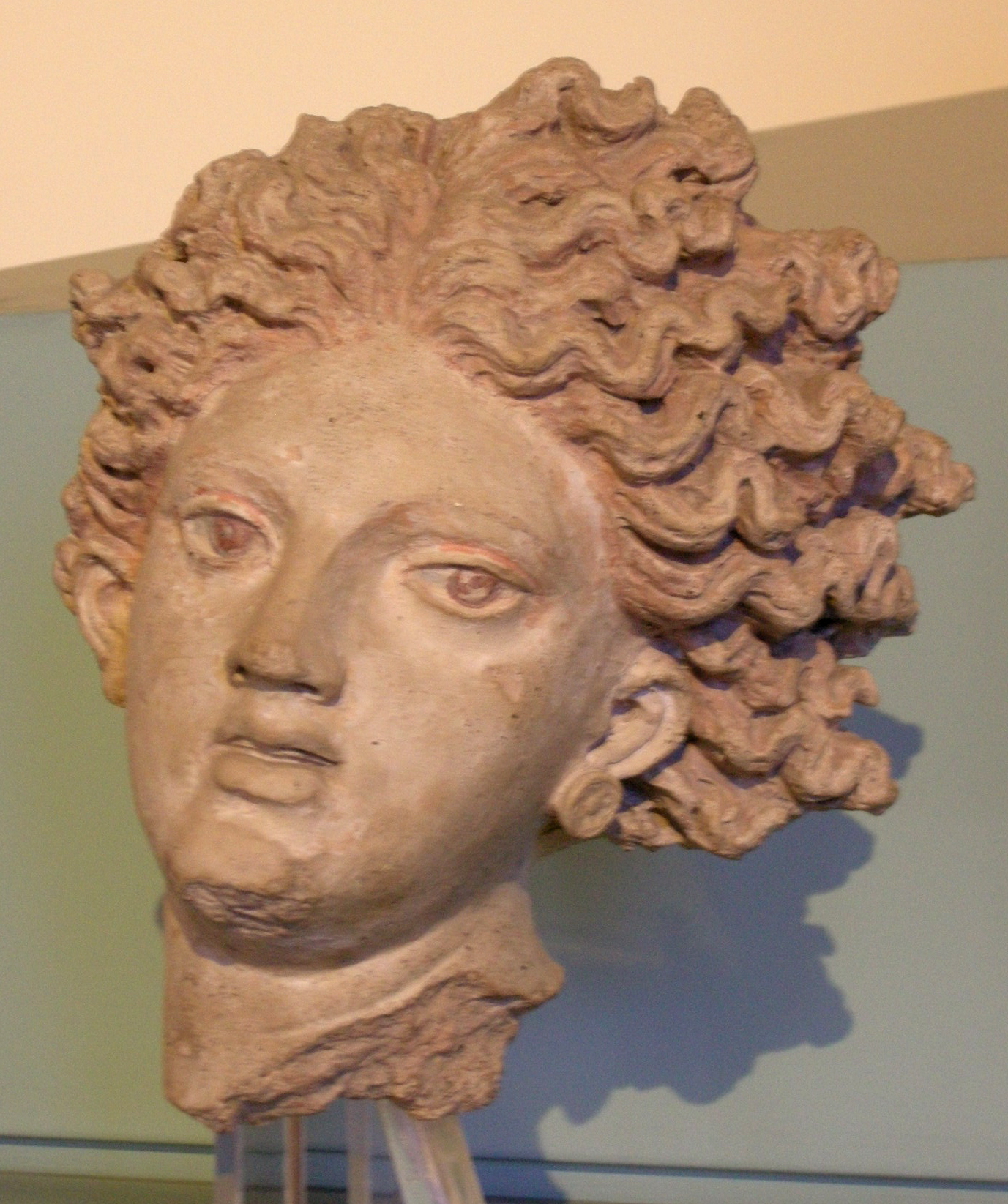
Head of Leucothea/Cavatha, Etruscan museum, Rome

The terracotta pediment at the back of the temple faced the entrance to the sanctuary. It portrayed the two most dramatic episodes in the Greek myth "The Seven against Thebes".

The high relief dates to the years 470-460 BC. The standard of its composition and style is particularly high and it is considered one of the masterpieces of all time. Firstly the overlapping of the two scenes has no equivalent in archaic relief tradition, and secondly the style of its specific ”tuscanic” tradition is still of late-archaic inspiration which is a precious testimony of the diffusion of the Greek myth in Etruria. The reproduction of drapery, hair and beards already denotes the manneristic style.

In the mid-upper section, Zeus attacks Capaneus who has climbed one of the gates of Thebes. Struck by divine thunder, the Argive hero clumsily backs away, his right hand raised in vain to strike, while shouting his anger and pain. In the background the Theban Polyphontes is held down by the god. In the foreground, below and all along the picture, is the ”grim repast”: Tydeus, fallen to the ground and dying, catches by the shoulders the Theban Melanippus, also dying, and is about to devour his skull. On the left Athena backs away, queasy because of the scene, and holds in her right hand the cruet containing the potion of eternal life that Zeus had made for Tydeas.

There are no known iconographical sources to serve as models by the unknown master who designed and moulded the clay for the relief by hand. The version of the saga which inspired the artist is not the one contained in the works of the great tragedians who related the stories of the Theban cycle in the fifth century BC; it is more likely the one recently attributed to Stesichorus of Himera, the poet who lived between Sicily and Magna Graecia in the archaic period. The theme chosen by the commissioning party reveals a deep knowledge of the Greek myth. Their message is thus explicit: with the help of the gods, the Thebans who had been unfairly assaulted triumphed over the ferocity and arrogance (hybris) of the Argive antagonists. The relief bears evidence of the condemnation of tyrannical hybris and exaltation of divine justice (dike) by the City of Caere, to which the sanctuary belonged. Its use as propaganda by the new political regime in Caere is also clear from its clearly visible location to those arriving at the coast along the road from Caere.

=== The southern sanctuary of Cavatha and Sur/Suri ===
A second sanctuary was discovered in 1983 to the south of the monumental one. It is characterised by the absence of large religious buildings, but by different types of altars and chapels without an overall plan and using building techniques and construction materials similar to local houses. The layout and finds suggest the practice of mysterious and Demetrical cults of which it is the oldest and most elaborate example in Etruria.

The most ancient structure, the sacellum "Beta" (530-520 BC), has a roof adorned with acroteria of busts of Achelous, a river divinity with a human head and bull's horns, ears and body, and female-headed antefixes perhaps representing the Nymphs. Votive deposits of Greek vases with Etruscan inscriptions attested to their dedication to the cult of the divine couple, Cavatha (similar to the Greek Kore-Persephone) and Sur/Suri (identifiable with an underworld Apollo).

Following the Dionysian looting, the southern sanctuary was abandoned and ritually sealed and the activity moved to the northern sector, with the creation of a new square, at the ends of which are located the quadrangular building Alpha (a) and the aedicula Pi (p) originally adorned with votive statues.

== The Pyrgi Tablets ==
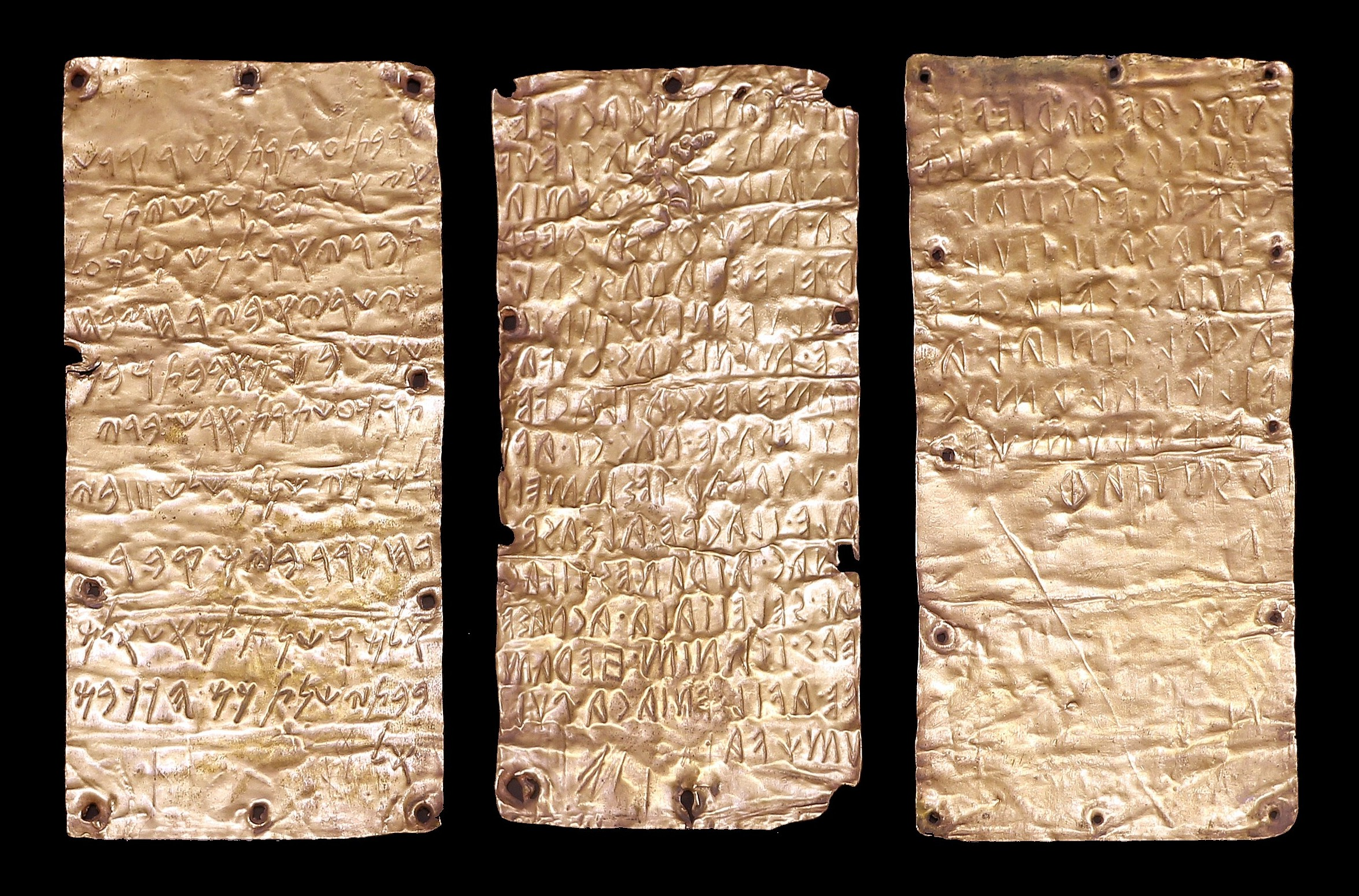
The Pyrgi Tablets

The gold Pyrgi Tablets of Thefarie Velianas, “king of Caere”, containing rare texts in Phoenician and Etruscan languages, were found here in 1964.
