= Pyrgi Tablets =

Etruscan artifact

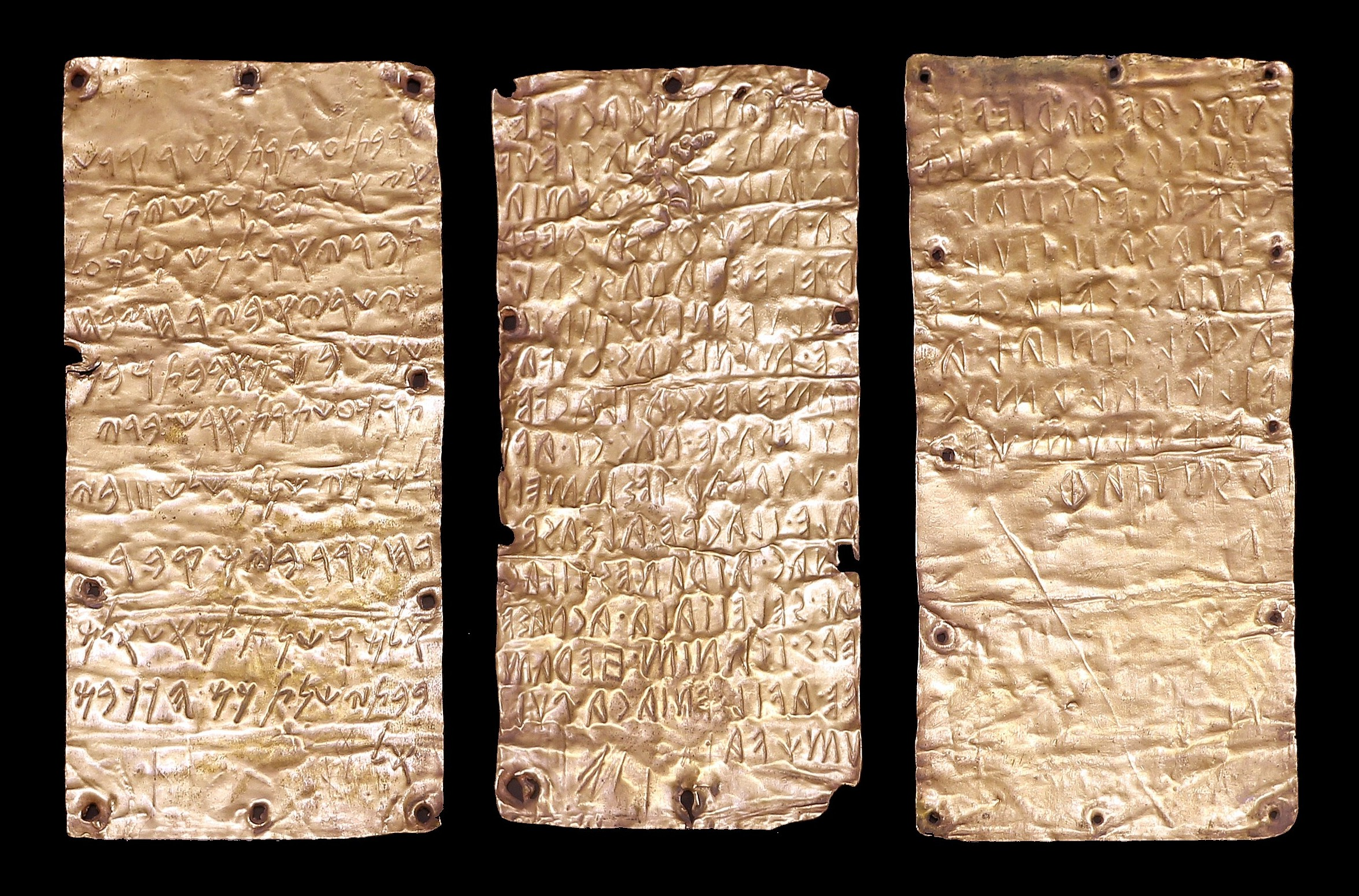
- The Pyrgi Tablets, sheets of gold with a bilingual treatise in Etruscan and Phoenician
- Material: Gold
- Created: c. 500 BC
- Discovered: 1964; Lazio, Italy
- Present location: Rome, Lazio, Italy
- Language: Etruscan and Phoenician

The Pyrgi Tablets (dated c. 500 BC) are three golden plates inscribed with a bilingual Phoenician–Etruscan dedicatory text. They are the oldest historical source documents from Italy, predating Roman hegemony, and are rare examples of texts in these languages. They were discovered in 1964 during a series of excavations at the site of ancient Pyrgi, on the Tyrrhenian coast of Italy in Latium (Lazio). The text records the foundation of a temple and its dedication to the Phoenician goddess Astarte, who is identified with the Etruscan supreme goddess Uni in the Etruscan text. The temple's construction is attributed to Thefarie Velianas, ruler of the nearby city of Caere.

Two of the tablets are inscribed in the Etruscan language, the third in Phoenician. The writings are important in providing both a bilingual text that allows researchers to use knowledge of Phoenician to interpret Etruscan, and evidence of Phoenician or Punic influence in the Western Mediterranean. They may relate to Polybius's report (Hist. 3,22) of an ancient and almost unintelligible treaty between the Romans and the Carthaginians, which he dated to the consulships of Lucius Junius Brutus and Lucius Tarquinius Collatinus (509 BC).

The Phoenician inscriptions are known as KAI 277. The tablets are now held at the National Etruscan Museum, Villa Giulia, Rome.

Pallottino has claimed that the existence of this bilingual suggests an attempt by Carthage to support or impose a ruler (Tiberius Velianas) over Caere at a time when Etruscan sea power was waning and to be sure that this region, with strong cultural ties to Greek settlements to the south, stayed in the Etrusco-Carthaginian confederacy. The exact nature of the rule of Tiberius Velianas has been the subject of much discussion. The Phoenician root MLK refers to sole power, often associated with a king. But the Etruscan text does not use the Etruscan word for 'king', lauχum, instead presenting the term for 'magistrate', zilac (perhaps modified by a word that may mean 'great'). This suggests that Tiberius Velianas may have been a tyrant of the kind found in some Greek cities of the time. Building a temple, claiming to have been addressed by a god, and creating or strengthening his connections with foreign powers may all have been ways that he sought to solidify and legitimate his own power.

Another area that the Pyrgi Tablets seem to throw light on is that Carthage was indeed involved in central Italy at this point in history. Such involvement was suggested by mentions by Polybius of a treaty between Rome and Carthage at about the same time period (circa 500 BC), and by Herodotus's accounts of Carthaginian involvement in the Battle of Alalia. But these isolated accounts did not have any contemporaneous texts from the area to support them until these tablets were unearthed and interpreted. Schmidtz originally claimed that the language pointed more toward an eastern Mediterranean form of Phoenician rather than to Punic/Carthaginian. But he has more recently reversed this view, and he even sees the possibility that the Carthaginians are directly referred to in the text.

The text is also important for our understanding of religion in central Italy around the year 500 BC. Specifically, it suggests that the commemoration of the death of Adonis was an important rite in Central Italy at least at this time (around 500 BC), that is if, as is generally assumed, the Phoenician phrase bym qbr ʼlm "on the day of the burial of the divinity" refers to this rite. This claim would be further strengthened if Schmidtz's recent claim can be accepted that the Phoenician phrase bmt n' bbt means "at the death of (the) Handsome (one) [=Adonis]." Together with evidence of the rite of Adonia in the Liber Linteus in the 7th column, there is a strong likelihood that the ritual was practiced in (at least) the southern part of Etruria from at least circa 500 BC through the second century BC (depending on one's dating of the Liber Linteus). Adonis himself does not seem to be directly mentioned in any of the extant language of either text.

== Phoenician text ==
The Phoenician inscriptions are known as KAI 277. Following is a transcription with English translations.

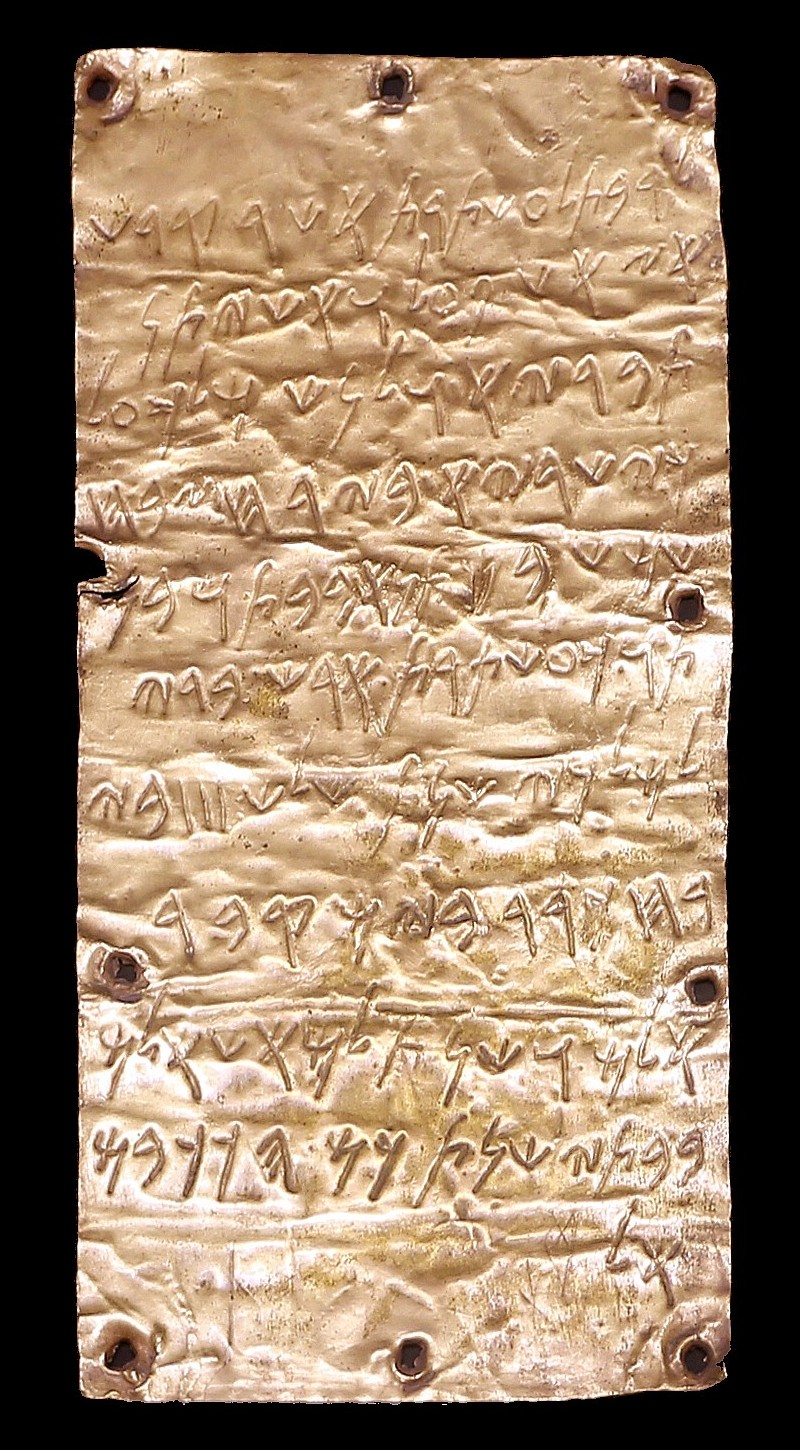
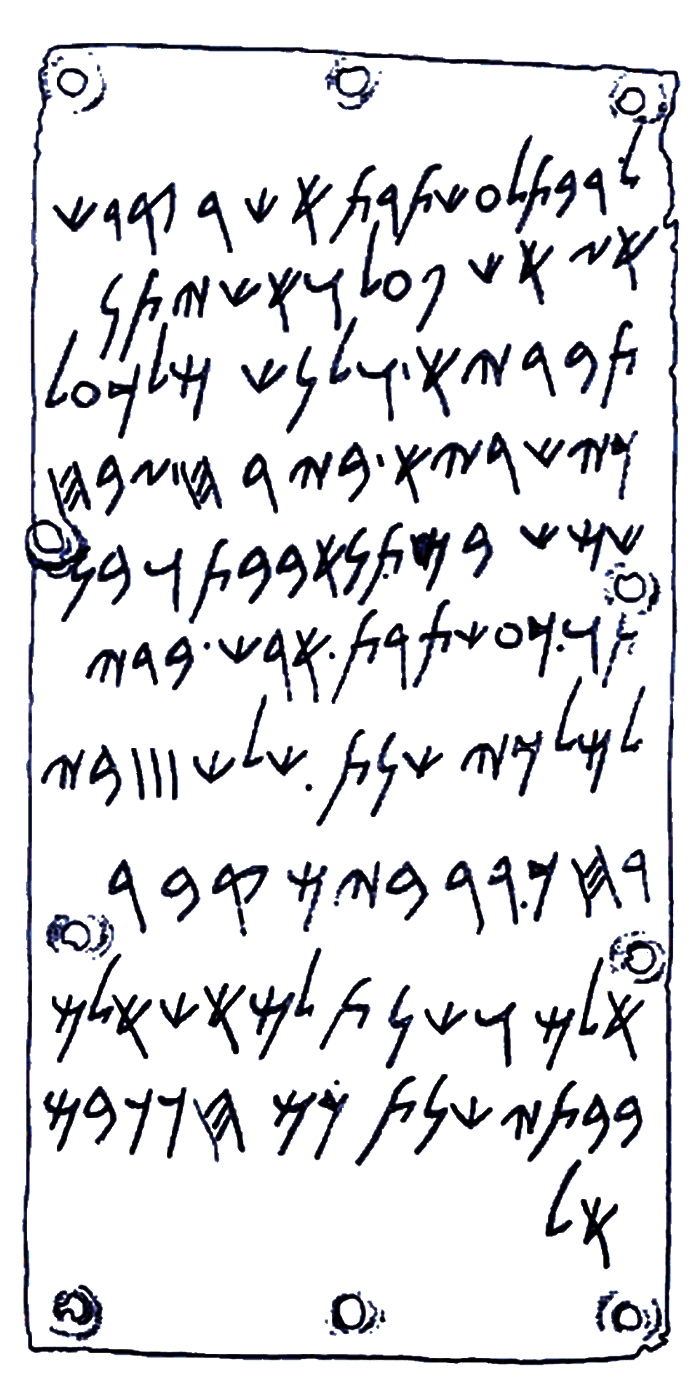
The Phoenician leaf with a transcription, based on Bonfante

lrbt lʿštrt,

For the Lady, for Astarte,

ʾšr qdš ʾz, ʾš pʿl, wʾš ytn tbryʾ wlnš, mlk ʿl kyšryʾ

this is the holy place, which was made, and which was placed (by) Tiberius Velianas, king over Kasriye (= Caerites?),

yrḥ zbḥ šmš, bmtnʾ bbt.

during the month of the sacrifice to the Sun, as an offering in the temple.

wbn tw, kʿštrt ʾrš bdy, lmlky šnt šlš 3, byrḥ krr, bym qbr ʾlm

And he built a chamber (or -bn TW = "Tiberius Velianas built (it)"), because Astarte requested (this) from him, year three "3" of his reign, in the month of Krr, on the day of the burial of the divinity.

wšnt lmʾš ʾlm bbty šnt km h kkb m ʾl.

And (may) the years of the statue of the deity in her temple (be) years like (or "as numerous as") the stars.

=== Translation variants ===
The Phoenician text has long been known to be in a Semitic, more specifically a Canaanite language (specifically North Canaanite; South Canaanite dialects include Hebrew, Moabite, and Edomite); hence there was no need for it to be "deciphered". And while most of the inscription can certainly reliably be read, certain passages are philologically uncertain on account of perceived complications of syntax and the vocabulary employed in the inscription, and as such they have become the source of debate among both Semiticists and classicists.

For example, other translations of the final line, besides that cited above, include: "And I made a duplicate of the statue of the goddess <Astarte> in her temple as do the Kakkabites [?Carthaginians]"; and "As for the red robe of the statues of the goddess <Astarte> in her temple, her/its red robe is like a those of the gods of the Kakkabites [Carthaginians]" (both of these from Krahmalkov's Phoenician-Punic Dictionary). Further, In Schmidtz's 2016 treatment of the text, he reinterprets the string bmtnʾ bbt (translated above and commonly as "as an offering in the temple") as bmt n' bbt to mean "at the death of (the) Handsome (one) [=Adonis]."

== Phoenician vocabulary ==
Much of the well known vocabulary (from the glossary by A. Bloch, 1890, unless otherwise indicated) of the text is, of course, religious, including rb-t "Lady," ʻštrt the goddess "Astarte," qdš "holy," ʼlm "divinity," bt "temple, house," zbḥ "sacrifice," qbr "burial"; or they involve the calendar or elements of the natural world: ym "day," yrḥ "month," šnt "year(s)," šmš "sun" (in this context, also a deity), kkb "stars." Common verbs include šmš "made," ytn "placed," bn "built," mlk "rule, reign." Most of the items below not covered in this list are grammatical elements, uncited claims, or reflect earlier scholarship that has now been superseded by newer studies.

Nouns in the text include: bt' , "house, temple" [Semitic *bayt- ], kkb , star [Semitic *kabkab- ] [hakkawkabīm/hakkawkabūm = the-stars], ʼlm , divinity [Semitic *ʼil- "god"], ʼšr , place, ʻštrt , Astarte [Semitic *ʻaṯtar- ], krr , Churvar [calendar month] [cf. Etruscan Χurvar], kyšryʼ , Caerites [a people], lmʼš , statue (But analyzed by some as the preposition lm "during" plus the relative pronoun ʼš "which"), mtnʼ', gift [Semitic *ntn 'to give'], qbr, burial, rbt, lady [cf. Akkadian rābu "grand, large"] [rabbu, female: rabbatu ], šmš, sun [Semitic *šamš-], šnt, year [šanot "years" – from: šanāt] , tw, aedicula [taw], yd, hand ym, day [Semitic *yawm-], yrḥ, month [Semitic *warḥu-] [Canaanite: yarhu], zbḥ, sacrifice

Verbs: mlk, to rule, to reign [Semitic *mlk], ʼrš, to raise, bn, to build [ bny ] [wayyiben = [and] he built], bn, to build [ bny ] [wayyiben = [and] he built], mlk, to rule, to reign [Semitic *mlk], pʻl, to make, to do [Semitic *pʻl], ::ytn, to give [Semitic *[y]-ntn] [ya-ntin[u]] he-gives / Hebrew: yittēn

Other: ʼš, which, who, that [rel.pron], ʼz, this [ ha-dha? ], ʻl, over, above [Semitic *ʻal-], b-, in, at, with, on [Semitic *bi-], bn, to build [ bny ] [wayyiben = [and] he built], k-, for, since [Semitic *ki-], km, like, as [ka-ma], l-, to, for [Semitic *la-], qdš, holy, šlš, three [Semitic *ṯalāṯ-], w-, and [Semitic *wa-]

== Etruscan text ==
This partial English translation is generally speculative, following van der Meer, except where noted. Line breaks are indicated with / with line numbers in superscript immediately following. Note that Schmitz has pointed out that "Etruscologists...dispute nearly every word in the Etruscan texts." Other proposed translations are presented in a 2022 article by M. Ivanković.

=== First plate ===
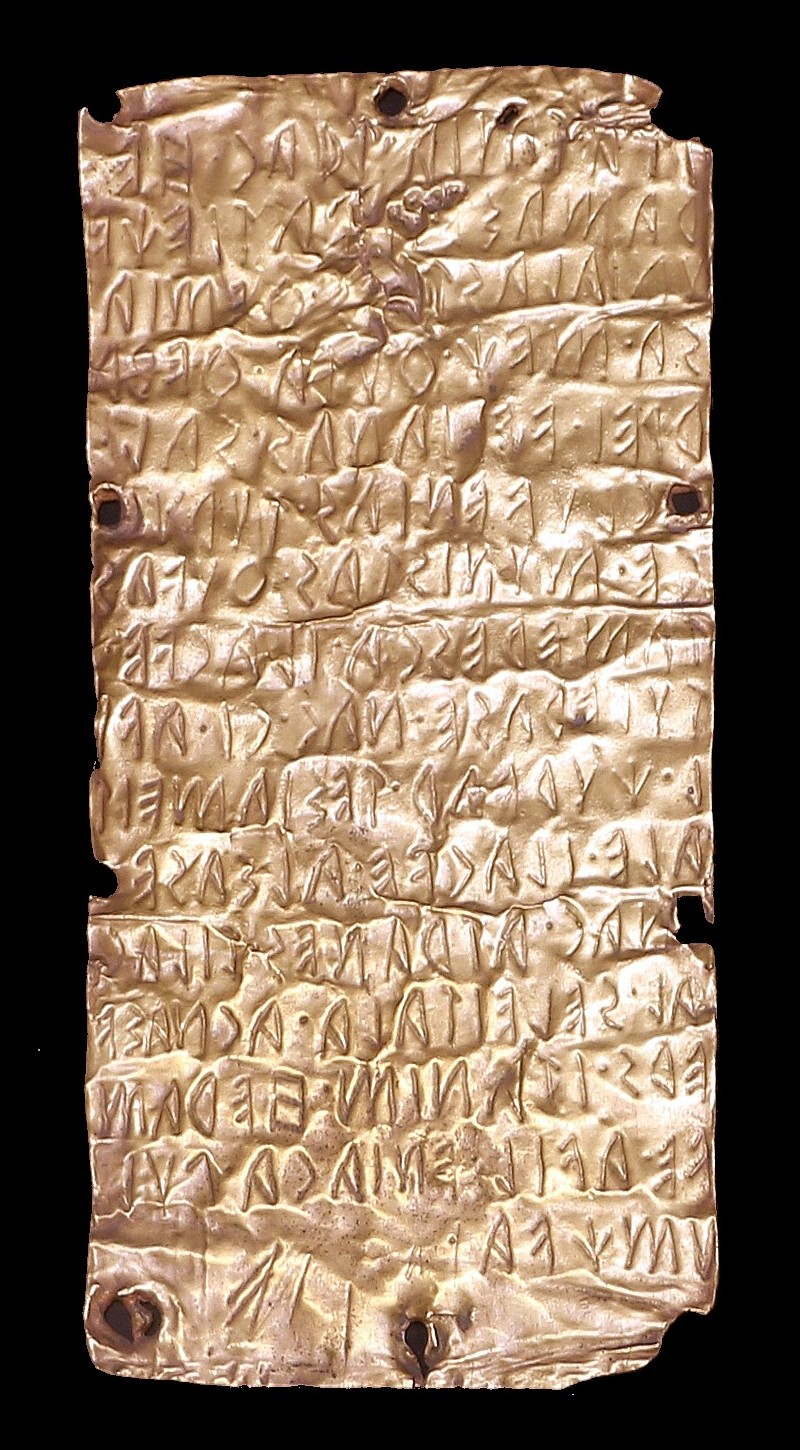
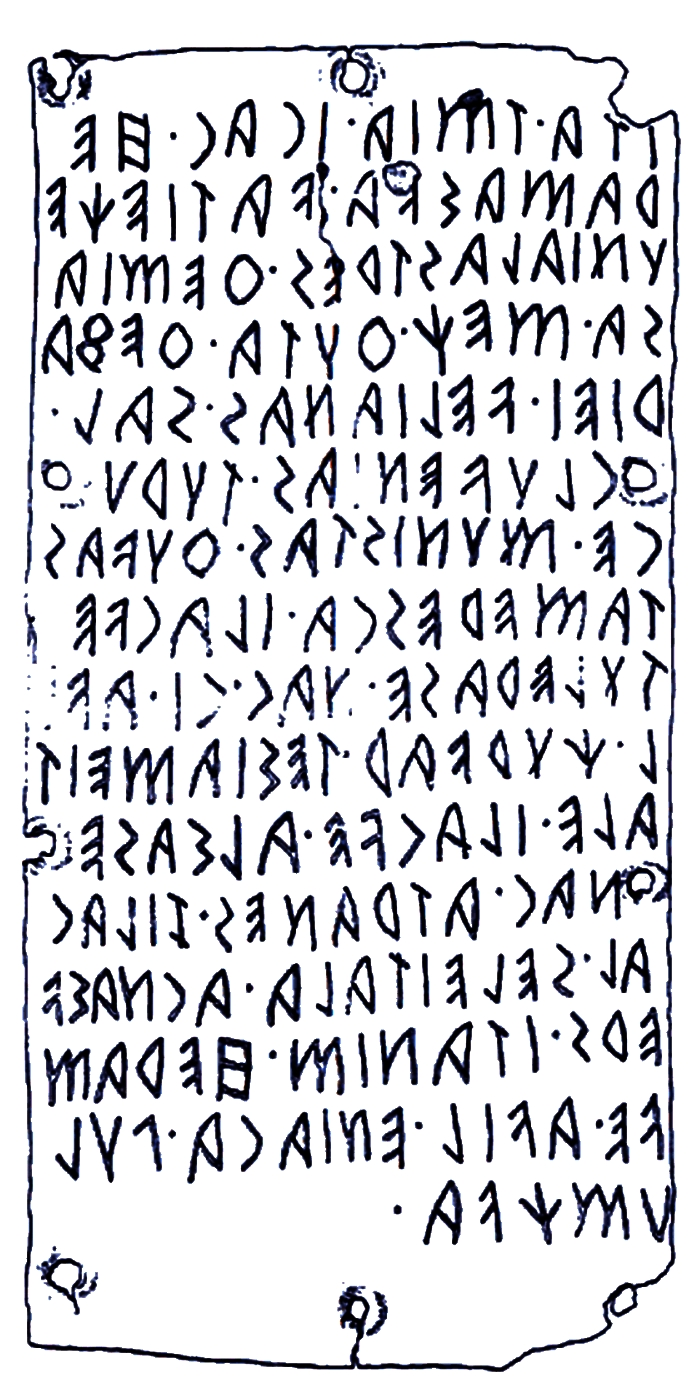
First of the two Etruscan leaves with a transcription, based on Bonfante

Ita tmia icac he/^{2}ramašva vatieχe /^{3} unial astres θemia /^{4} sa meχ θuta

This temple and sacred buildings (herama-šva) have been requested by Juno Astar(t)e...having been built at his own (sa) cost(?),

θefa/^{5}riei velianas sal /^{6} cluvenias turu/^{7}ce

Tiberius Velianas ...has given (tur-ce) (it) as an offering(?), (or "according to her own (sal) wishes (cluvenias))

munistas θuvas/^{8} tameresca

(as) custodian(?) of the place(?) of the cella (or "the funeral chamber" tameres-ca)

ilacve /^{9} tulerase

during the feast (of the month) of Tuler

nac ci avi/^{10}l χar var tesiamet /^{11} ale

when three years (were) full (?) from the day of Tesiamet

ilacve alšase /^{12}

on the feast of (the month) Alsasa

nac atranes zila /^{13} cal sel eita la acnašv/^{14}ers

when the atranes of the magistrate (was??) (the) great acnasvers.

Itanim heram/^{15}ve avil eniaca pul/^{16}umχva

Indeed, in this sanctuary, the years are (going to be) as many as the stars.

=== Second plate ===
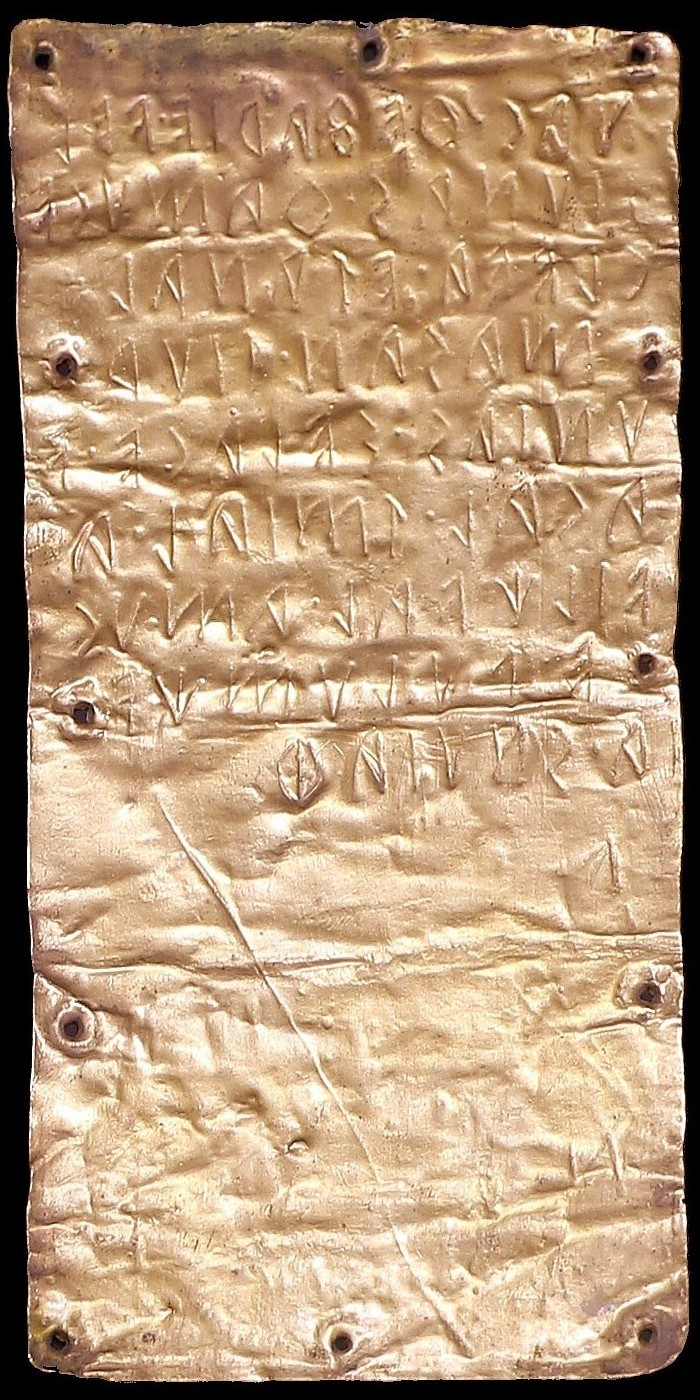
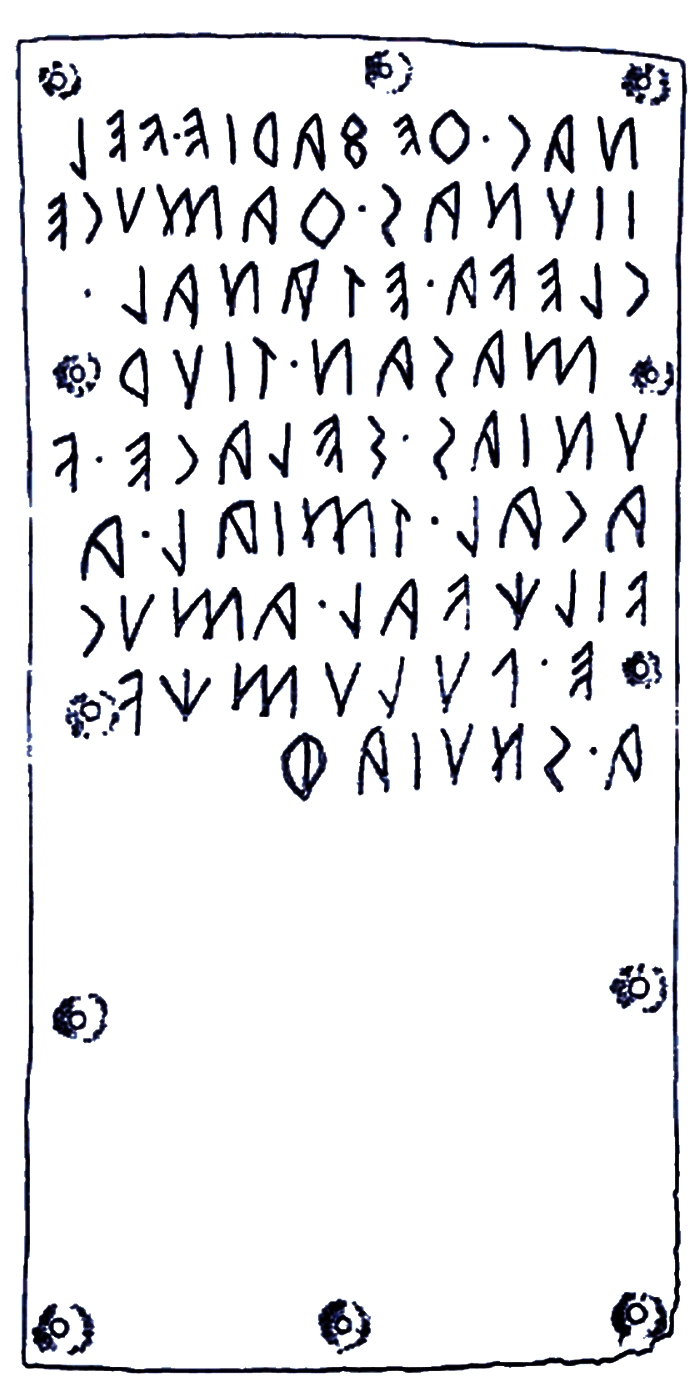
Second Etruscan leaf, with transcription based on Bonfante

nac θefarie vel/^{2}iiunas θamuce /^{3} cleva etanal/^{4}

When Tiberius Velianas had built (θamu-ce) the cleva ("altar(s)"? or "desiderata"?) of Etan (epithet of Uni?)

masan tiur /^{5} unias šelace

he dedicated (šela-ce) an offering during the month (tiur) of Juno.

v/^{6}acal tmial a/^{7}vilχval amuc/^{8}e pulumχv/^{9}a snuiaφ

The yearly (avil-χva-l literally "of the years") offerings for the temple were (amu-ce) (to be like the) eternal (snuiaφ?) stars.

==== Translation variants ====
Wylin translates šelace vacal tmial (4–5) as "has ratified the offering of the temple." However, Steinbauer (agreeing with Rix) has challenged this assumption and, considering that it seems to be positioned at the beginning of a series of phrases within the contexts of a step-by-step instruction in the Liber Linteus, proposed that vacal (with its variants vacil and vacl) simply means "then." The second to last word, pulum-χva, is clearly a plural, so would match the (putative) plural 'star-s' of the Phoenician text in this location. It also occurs in one of the supplementary texts below, as well as in the inscription in the Golini Tomb, but in the latter context, this meaning does not seem to fit.

A minimalist 'translation' drawing only on well established meanings of Etruscan words, and not depending on the Phoenician text (which is often itself uncertain, see above, and is, in any case, not a word for word translation) has been presented by Adiego:

This tmia- and the herama, which were ...-ed from the part of Uni, Thefarie Velianas, ...ing the meχ θuta, gave to her, the cluvenia- (or: to his cluvenia-), to/of the muni θuva, that from the chamber (?) in the day- ilacv tuleras-, when three years χurvar. In the day-ilacv the tešiam(a)- alsaš-, when of the zilaχ-magistracy atrane, that sele acnavers, and this(?)/thus...-ed the year eniaca the pulum-s.

When Thefarie Veliiunas θamu-...-ed a cleva-offering etenal masan the month unias sela- ...-ed vacal the pulum-s of the years of the tmia- were sniuaφ.

== Etruscan vocabulary ==
Much of the more certainly defined vocabulary (from the glossary in Pallottino, 1975, unless otherwise indicated) of the text is again, of course, religious, including references to the god uni "Juno," nouns like tmia "temple," vacal "offering, libation (?)," and ilucve "festival"; or they involve the calendar or elements of the natural world: tiur "month, moon," avil "year(s)," pulum-χva "stars" (?). Other well attested words in the text include the number "three" ci, and some common verbs such as turu- "give" and am- "be," and the well known term for "magistrate" zilac-. Most of the rest of the words are contested or uncertain.

=== Verbs ===
acna(s), to bring forth
am, to be
tur, to give (⟨tur-uc-e⟩ 'has given')
θem, to build, establish

=== Nouns ===
astre, Phoenician goddess of fertility,
atran, reign, rulership?
avil, year (⟨avilχva-l⟩ 'of the years, yearly')
xurvar, month [Phoenician ⟨krr⟩ *kurar]
meχ, people
pulum, star
tiur, month
tmia, temple (⟨tmia-l⟩ 'of the temple')
θefariei, Tiberius [Roman male name]
uni, Etruscan mother goddess of fertility [cf. Latin Iūno]
vacal, votive offering
velianas, Velianas [family name].
zilac magistrate

=== Other parts of speech ===
ca, this; ica-c and this
ci, three
nac, when, during, while
śnuiu-aφ, as many? (LLZ, col 6, lines 1,2,4)

== Supplementary Etruscan Texts ==
=== Inscription on a bronze tablet at Pyrgi ===
These were much more damaged than the gold tablets above. Cr 4.3:

[...]atalen[----]s tin[--
[----]e[...] spuria[z]es . tera[s] spu[r]iaze[...]
u]neial var θvarie χia uneial χias
tin[...]talenas seas tinas θvarienas [...]e[...]ur
...]ar[...]ra[...]il[...]a[...]p[...

Cr 4.2

eta : θesan:e:tras u:ni(χ?)iaθi ha[...]
hutilatina e:tiasas: a:calia[...]
θanaχ:vilus caθar:naial[...]

Deities mentioned here include Catha, Thesan, Uni Chia, Tina Atalena Sea, Tina Thvariena, and Spuriaze.

=== Inscriptions on vessels found in the sanctuary at Pyrgi ===
1 ]tmia[ 2 ]usa[

n32, fragment of a vase, VI

unial

(div) patera, or plate V TLE 877

unial

(div) patera, or plate V REE 40 n54

- ]**starte/s/** [?] **cve[r ]starte**/ /
(div?) fragment of a vase, or vessel IV REE 56 n31

mi : s'uris : cavaθas

(div)patera, or plate V REE 64 n36

]cavaθas 2]a emini[

(div)Greek kylix, V REE 56 n24 Lead tablet from the temple of Minerva at Castrum Novum (near Pyrgi) (CIE 631

MMMCCC lan[-]mite . [
...]inia . tei . a emei ca . zu[-]una . za[...
a . icecin . ezi . ip[...]unu . rapa . [-]um[...
...]ipas . [-]in[...]ver . mulven[...
...] . nuna ("offering")[...] nun . ena . t[...
...]e . hu[...]al . nun ena .
...]ur . t[...]na . vacil . c[...

...]pulunza . ipal . sac ("holy")[...
...]talte . acni talte . iu[...
...]umnle[...]menatina . te[---]un[...
...]us . -u--helucu . acasa . tei . luru[...
...]t[...-]sice . lanumite . icana[...
...]aei . tesa . nac[...]ce . mulv[...
...]ur . t[...]na . vacil . c[
...]pa . mlaka [....]ama .

Side 2:

...]ite . icec[......] civeis . m[...
...] . unue . ha[...]u . eizurva . t[...
...]n[-]va . mlacia . hecia ("to do, place") . iperi . apa ("father")[...
...]esunamul ame

...]iama . im[...]nuta : h[...
...] . rin[...]v . a emeican . s[-]uinia . ip[...
...]t[-]as . [...]n[-]e . nac arsurve clesvare[...

Notes: Words also occurring in the gold Pyrgi Tablets are in bold: pulun/m "star(s)?; vaci/al "sacrifice/libation", or "then"; nac "when."

Words and sequences recurring within the text include: lan(u)mite ?; a emei ca . z/suu/ina ? (ca "this"); mul-v- "to offer"; nun ena "offering" (nun?) "some" (ena?); mlaka/cia "beautiful"; te-i (demonstrative pronoun); am-e/-a "be"; ac-ni/-asa ("to do, offer"); talte (< talitha "girl"??); icec-in, icana- ? (< ic "as"??).
