= Caere =

Etruscan settlement

Coordinates: 42°00′06″N 12°06′30″E

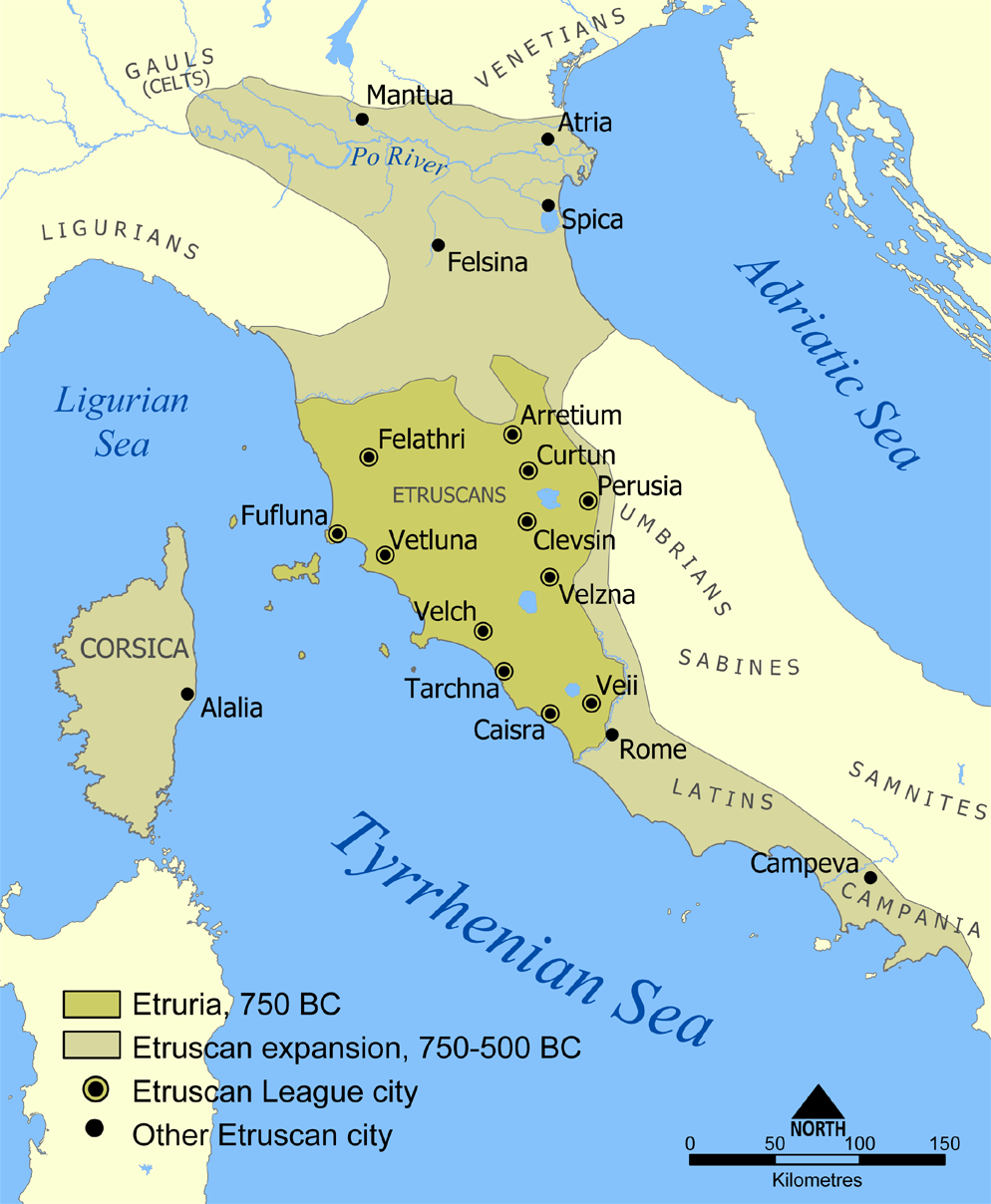
Map of the Etruscan civilisation

Caere (also Caisra and Cisra) is the Latin name given by the Romans to one of the larger cities of southern Etruria, the modern Cerveteri, approximately 50–60 kilometres north-northwest of Rome. To the Etruscans it was known as Cisra, to the Greeks as Agylla and to the Phoenicians as 𐤊𐤉𐤔𐤓𐤉𐤀 (kyšryʼ).

Caere was one of the most important and populous Etruscan city-states, in area 15 times larger than today's town, and only Tarquinia was equal in power at its height around 600 BC. Caere was also one of the cities of the Etruscan League. Its sea port and monumental sanctuary at Pyrgi was important for overseas trade. Today, the area of Cerveteri is best known for its Etruscan necropolis and archaeological treasures.

== Geography ==
The ancient city was situated on a hill about 7 km from the sea, a location which made it a wealthy trading town derived originally from the iron ore mines in the Tolfa hills. It had three sea ports including Pyrgi and Punicum. It was bounded by the two rivers Mola and Manganello, and lay 80 metres above sea level on an outcrop of rocky tuff. The hill ran from northeast to southwest, isolated except on the northeast. The modern town, at the western extremity, probably occupies the site of the acropolis. The line of the city walls, of rectangular blocks of tufa, can be traced, and there seem to have been eight gates in the circuit, which was about four miles in length. There are no remains of buildings of importance, except the theatre, in which many inscriptions and statues of emperors were found.

== History ==
The earliest evidence of settlement of the site comes from finds of urns at two areas (Cava della Pozzolana and Sorbo) from the 9th and 8th centuries BC. Archaeology has revealed the presence of stable economic activity in the area, with housing and related Etruscan necropolis settlements.

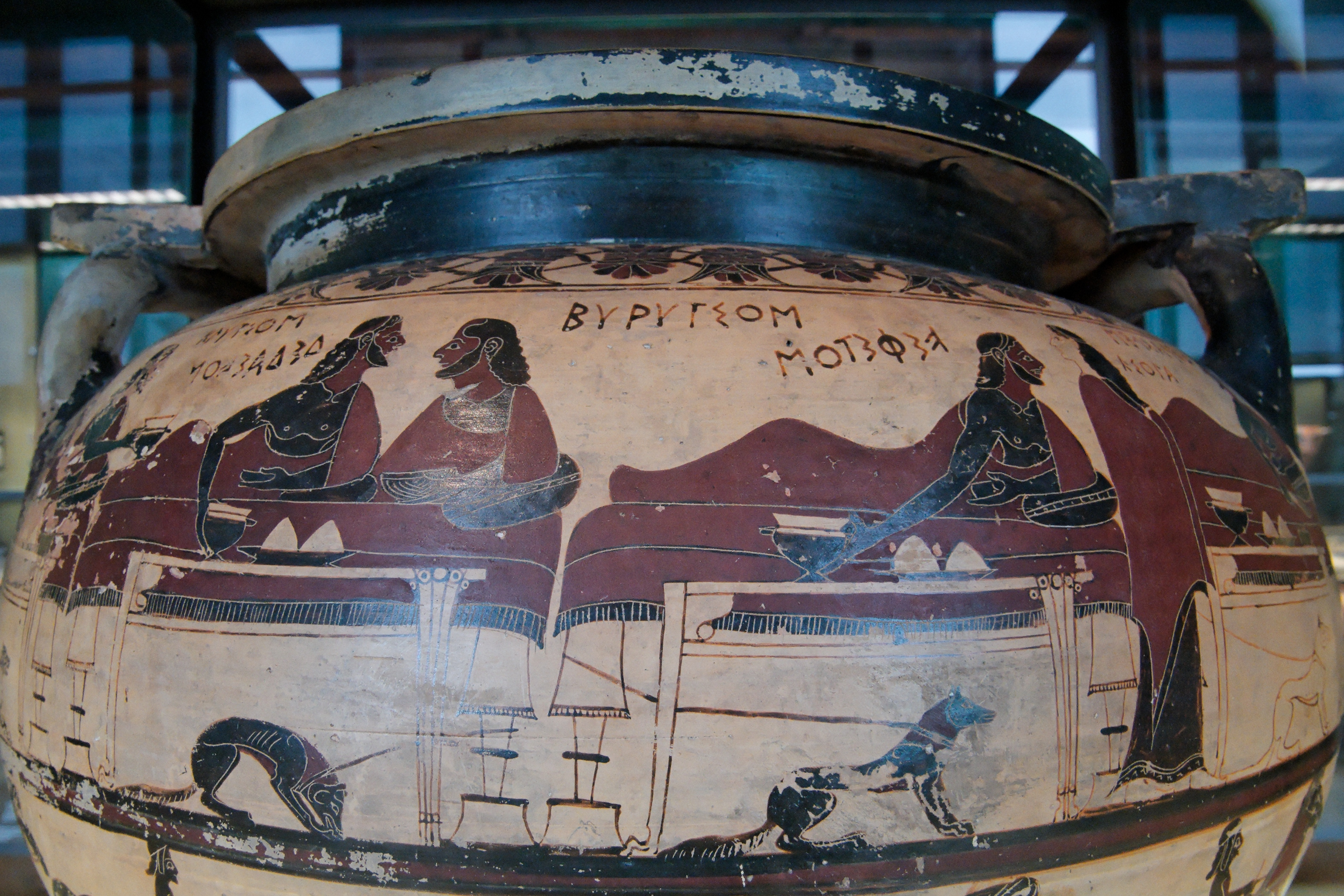
Example of Greek-style pottery in Caere. Eurytus and Heracles in a symposium. Krater of Corinthian columns called 'Krater of Eurytus', c. 600 BC

Trade between the Greeks and Etruscans became increasingly common in the middle of the 8th century BC, with standardised urns and pottery common in graves of the time. The town became the main Etruscan trading centre during the 7th century BC, and trade increased with other Greek colonies in Southern Italy and Sicily, and with the Corinthians. Locally manufactured products began to imitate imported Greek pottery, especially after the immigration of Greek artists into Etruria.

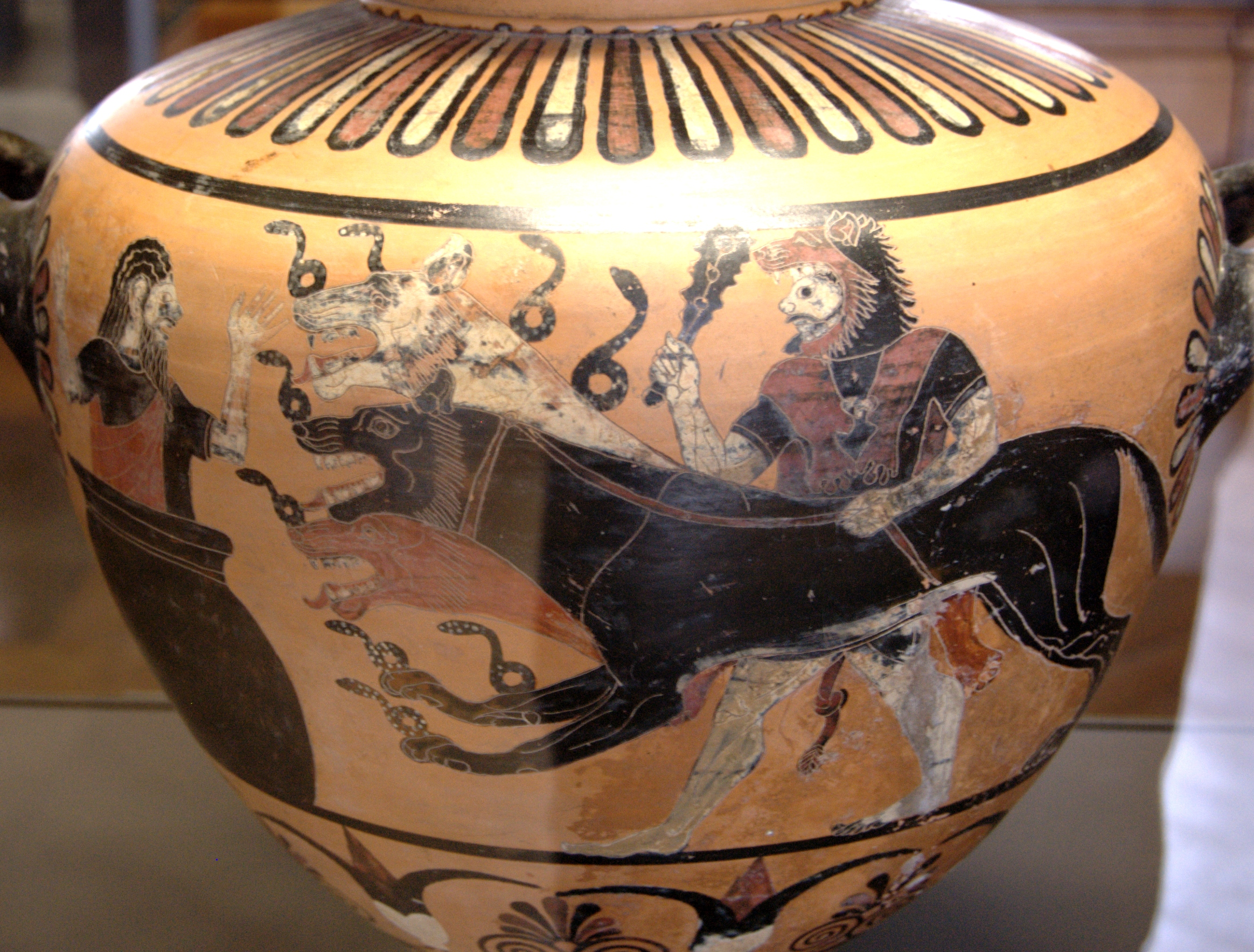
An ancient Etruscan vase from Caere (c. 525 BC), depicting Heracles presenting Cerberus to Eurystheus

The oldest examples of Bucchero ceramics come from Caere and it can be assumed that these typical Etruscan ceramics were developed here or produced at least for the first time in large scale.

The early prosperity of the city is demonstrated by graves from the Orientalizing Period, from around 700 BC, which often contain eastern imports and rich gold finds; the Regolini-Galassi tomb is especially notable for its fine gold offerings. From 530 to 500 BC a generation of Greek artists was active in the city, producing colour-painted hydrias. Burials of the time became increasingly grand, with jewellery and other products of particularly fine manufacture, illustrating the continuing good fortunes of the city. At the height of its prosperity in the 6th century BC, the people of Caere (with the Carthaginians) emerged marginally victorious from clashes with the Phocaean Greeks.

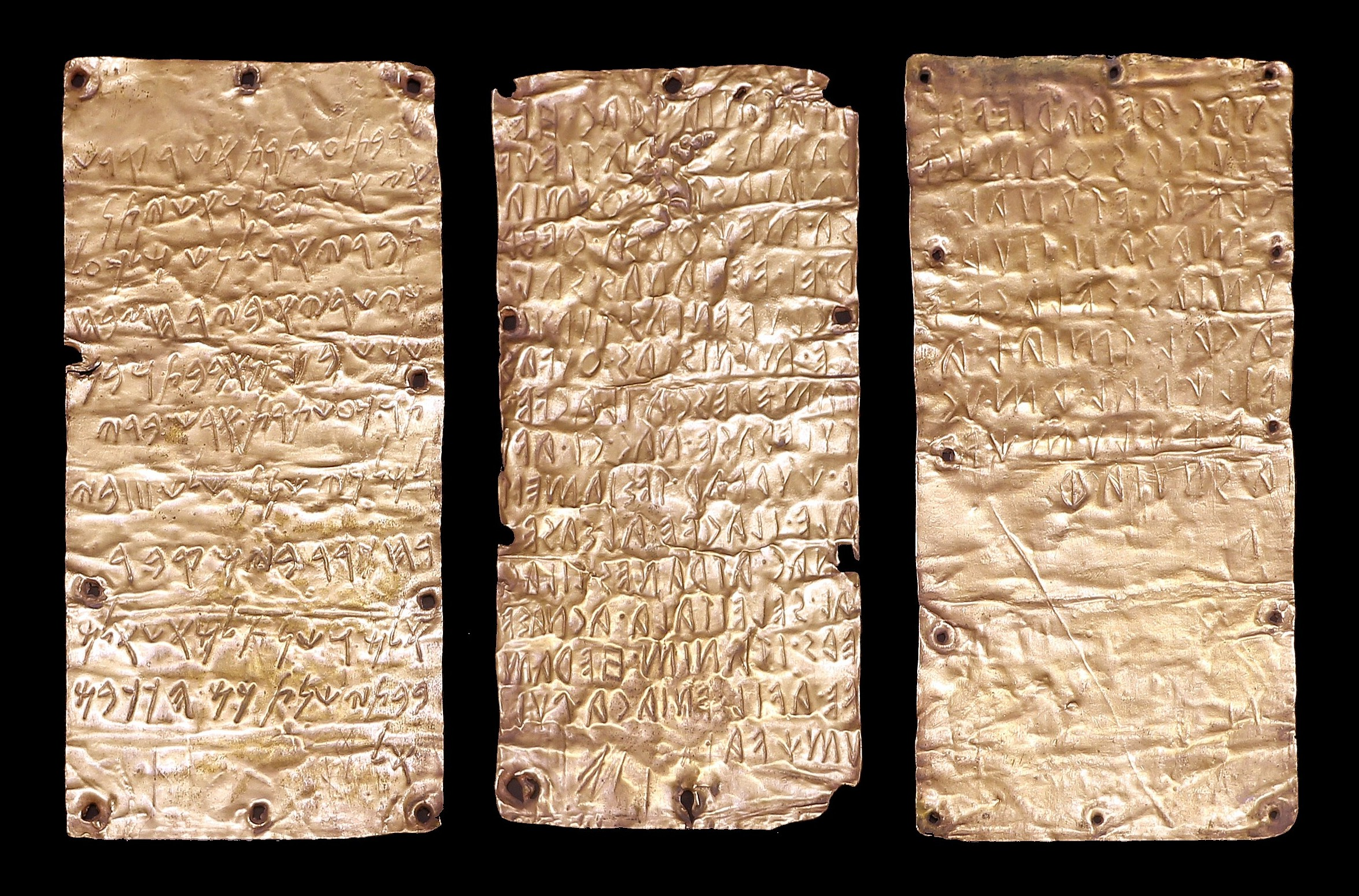
Pyrgi Tablets, Phoenician-Etruscan bilingual inscription mentioning Caere

Caere had a good reputation among the Greeks for its values and sense of justice, since it abstained from piracy. It was one of only two Etruscan cities to erect its own treasury at Delphi, the "Agillei Treasury" dedicated to Pythian Apollo. This was generally not allowed to non-Greeks, and the legends regarding earlier Greek colonization in the wider area of Caere and Rome seem to have played an important role in allowing what was, from a political point of view, a bold act. Delphi was also a centre of politics and intrigue for the whole Eastern Mediterranean and Near East area.

Caere appears for the first time in documented history in 540 BC concerning the Battle of Alalia in which captured prisoners were stoned to death in the city, an act that was later attributed as the cause of an ensuing plague. In recompense, athletic contests were held every year in the city to honour the dead. In 509 BC, upon the overthrow of the Roman monarchy, the king Lucius Tarquinius Superbus and his two eldest sons Titus and Aruns went into exile in Caere.

In spite of the difficulties affecting Etruria during the period, trade once again flourished through the 5th century BC, arguably due to the particularly good relations with the Rome, a traditional ally of the city. Communication with Rome was via branch roads from the Via Aurelia and Via Clodia.

Caere was not spared by the crisis that affected the great centres of southern Etruria during the second half of that century, after the defeat at sea at the Battle of Cumae in 474 BC. A recovery can be perceived, however, at the beginning of the 4th century BC, when strong relationships with Rome continued. The town sheltered the Roman refugees including the priests and Vestal Virgins after the Gallic attack and fire of 390 BC, and the Roman aristocracy was educated in Caere.

The Roman Tabulae Caeritum dates from this time; it listed those citizens of Caere who were classed as Roman citizens and liable for military service, without being able to vote. It is supposed to have been the first community to receive this privilege, known as ius Caeritum.

In 384/383 BC Dionysius plundered Pyrgi. Support came from Caere, but this was also beaten.

In 353 BC Caere, allied to the Tarquinii, lost a war with Rome and with it some of its territory, including the coastal area and ports so important for trade. From about 300 BC Caere came under Roman rule. Although the exact sequence of their submission can no longer be reconstructed today, there had been numerous feuds. Rome is said to have had a 100-year truce with Caere as a result, and virtually all Etruria was in Roman hands from about 295 BC. It provided Rome with various provisions during the First Punic War, but otherwise contributed little materially.

The city briefly regained some prosperity under either Augustus or Tiberius, but lost its wealth and power completely by the first century AD.

== Ancient bishopric ==
Saint Adeodatus participated as bishop of this episcopal see, in a synod at Rome called by Pope Symmachus in 499, shortly before the seat of the bishopric was moved, because of malaria, from Caere Vetus (today's Cerveteri) to the new settlement of Caere Nova (today's Ceri). The territory of the Diocese of Caere became part of the Diocese of Porto around the 11th century.

No longer a residential bishopric, Caere is today listed by the Catholic Church as a titular see.

== Archaeological site ==
During the period 700-300 BC the inhabitants constructed an impressive necropolis known today as Banditaccia, which is still not fully excavated but has already yielded the "Sarcophagus of the Spouses".

Since 2012, Queen's University at Kingston has been leading archaeology at the urban centre known as Vigna Marini.

== See also ==
- Pyrgi, one of its harbours
- Pyrgi Tablets
