= Pura Vida Conspiracy =

Studio album by Gogol Bordello
- Released: July 23, 2013
- Recorded: December 2012
- Studio: Sonic Ranch Studios, El Paso, Texas
- Genre: Folk punk, Punk rock, Gypsy punk, Reggae, Latin rock
- Length: 51:09
- Label: ATO
- Producer: Andrew Scheps

Gogol Bordello chronology
| Trans-Continental Hustle (2010) | Pura Vida Conspiracy (2013) | Seekers and Finders (2017) |

Professional ratings
Aggregate scores
| Source | Rating |
|---|---|
| Metacritic | 75/100 |
Review scores
| Source | Rating |
| AllMusic | 4/5 stars |
| Consequence of Sound | 4/5 stars |
| MSN Music (Expert Witness) | A |
| MusicOMH | 4/5 stars |
| PopMatters | 9/10 |
| Slant Magazine | 3.5/5 stars |

Pura Vida Conspiracy is the sixth studio album by folk punk band Gogol Bordello. It was released in July 2013 under ATO Records.

== Track list ==
All tracks are written by Oliver Charles, Thomas Gobena, Eugene Hütz, Yuri Lemeshev, Sergey Ryabtsev, Pedro Erazo-Segovia and Michael Ward

| No. | Title | Length |
|---|---|---|
| 1. | "We Rise Again" | 3:42 |
| 2. | "Dig Deep Enough" | 3:42 |
| 3. | "Malandrino" | 3:33 |
| 4. | "Lost Innocent World" | 4:26 |
| 5. | "It Is The Way You Name Your Ship" | 3:38 |
| 6. | "The Other Side of Rainbow" | 3:16 |
| 7. | "Amen" | 4:15 |
| 8. | "I Just Realized" | 3:27 |
| 9. | "My Gypsy Auto Pilot" | 3:47 |
| 10. | "Hieroglyph" | 3:49 |
| 11. | "John the Conqueror (Truth Is Always the Same)" | 3:39 |
| 12. | "We Shall Sail" (3:42, hidden track "Jealous Sister" starts at 7:38) | 10:05 |

LP edition bonus tracks
| No. | Title | Length |
|---|---|---|
| 13. | "Crack the Case" |
| 14. | "Jealous Sister" |
