= Trans-Continental Hustle =

Studio album by Gogol Bordello
- Released: April 27, 2010
- Recorded: the Document Room (Malibu, CA)
- Genre: Folk punk, Punk rock, Gypsy punk, Latin rock, Folk music
- Length: 53:46
- Label: American Recordings
- Producer: Rick Rubin

Gogol Bordello chronology
Super Taranta! (2007)	Trans-Continental Hustle (2010)	Pura Vida Conspiracy (2013)

Professional ratings
Aggregate scores
Source	Rating
Metacritic	72/100
Review scores
Source	Rating
Pitchfork Media	(6.4/10)
Slant Magazine	2.5/5 stars
Music Emissions	4.0/5 stars
Future Tunez	3.5/5 stars
Robert Christgau	(3-star Honorable Mention)
Rolling Stone	3.5/5 stars
Off the Dial	(favorable)

Trans-Continental Hustle is the fifth album by folk punk band Gogol Bordello, released on April 27, 2010. Produced by Rick Rubin, Trans-Continental Hustle primarily draws inspiration from frontman Eugene Hütz's life in Brazil, where he had been living since 2008. This album is Gogol Bordello's major record label debut. The collaboration with Rubin was initiated after guitarist Tom Morello of Rage Against the Machine saw Gogol Bordello perform in Los Angeles and recommended that Rubin look into the band. "Immigraniada (We Comin' Rougher)", the fifth track on the album, has received heavy airplay on Sirius XM Radio's Faction Channel 41 as well as other genre stations. At least two of Faction's shows have played the single, including The Jason Ellis Show and Faction with Christian James Hand.

== Track listing ==
No.	Title	Length
1.	"Pala Tute"	4:05
2.	"My Companjera"	3:22
3.	"Sun Is on My Side"	4:25
4.	"Rebellious Love"	3:57
5.	"Immigraniada (We Comin' Rougher)"	3:47
6.	"When Universes Collide"	4:48
7.	"Uma Menina"	4:35
8.	"Raise the Knowledge"	4:57
9.	"Last One Goes the Hope"	4:35
10.	"To Rise Above"	3:48
11.	"In the Meantime in Pernambuco"	3:11
12.	"Break the Spell"	4:07
13.	"Trans-Continental Hustle"	4:17

iTunes Bonus Track
No.	Title	Length
14.	"Cynic"	3:23

== Personnel ==
The Band

- Eugene Hütz - vocals, acoustic guitar, percussion
- Sergey Ryabtsev - violin, backing vocals
- Yuri Lemeshev - accordion, backing vocals
- Oren Kaplan - guitar, backing vocals
- Thomas Gobena - bass, backing vocals
- Pamela Jintana Racine - percussion, backing vocals, dance
- Elizabeth Sun - percussion, backing vocals, dance
- Pedro Erazo - percussion, MC
- Oliver Charles - drums
