= East Infection =

EP by Gogol Bordello
- Released: March 22, 2005
- Recorded: Integrated Studios, New York City, Winter 2004 – January 2005.
- Genre: Folk punk, Punk rock, Gypsy punk, Dub music
- Length: 21:57
- Label: Rubric Records

Gogol Bordello chronology
Gogol Bordello vs. Tamir Muskat (2004)	East Infection (2005)	Gypsy Punks: Underdog World Strike (2005)

East Infection is currently the only EP by Gogol Bordello, released in 2005 by Rubric Records. Released prior to the album Gypsy Punks, it consists of leftover tracks from that album's sessions.

The title track remains a live favourite. "Ave. B" was rerecorded as "Avenue B" for Gypsy Punks, and "Strange Uncles From Abroad" was rerecorded as "My Strange Uncles From Abroad" for Super Taranta! "Copycat" is also notable for being the band's first song in the dub style. "Mala Vida" is a cover of a song by Mano Negra, and "Madagascar-Roumania" incorporates a traditional Boyash folk song, "Tu Jésty Fáta" (standard Romanian: "Tu Esti Fata").

Professional ratings
Review scores
Source	Rating
Allmusic	link
Robert Christgau	(A−) link

== Track listing ==
All songs by Eugene Hütz. All music by Eugene Hütz and Gogol Bordello, except "Mala Vida" (Mano Negra) and "Tu Jésty Fáta" (Romanian folk song).

No.	Title	Length
1.	"East Infection"	2:20
2.	"Ave. B" (Produced/Recorded by Gogol Bordello. Mixed by Oren Kaplan and Eugene Hütz, winter 2004.)	2:57
3.	"Mala Vida" (Produced by Steve Albini at Electrical Audio Studios, Chicago. October 2004. Mixed by Eyal Midyan in January 2005.)	3:08
4.	"Copycat" (Recorded by Steve Albini at Electrical Audio Studios, Chicago, October 2004. Mixed by Rea Mochiach and Eugene Hütz at Dumbeat Studios, Brooklyn, New York, January 2005.)	2:41
5.	"Strange Uncles From Abroad" (Produced/Recorded by Gogol Bordello. Mixed by Oren Kaplan and Eugene Hutz, Winter 2004.)	4:13
6.	"Madagascar-Roumania (Tu Jésty Fáta)" (Produced/Recorded/Mixed by Eliot Ferguson and Eugene Hütz. Winter 2004.)	6:32

Enhanced Element:

1. "Never Young Again" - Video by Dimon.

== Personnel ==
- Eugene Hutz – Vocals, Acoustic Guitar, Drums on Track 4
- Sergey Ryabtsev – Violin, Backing Vocals
- Yuri Lemeshev – Accordion, Backing Vocals
- Oren Kaplan – Guitar, Backing Vocals
- Rea Mochiach – Bass
- Eliot Ferguson – Drums
- Pamela Jintana Racine – Percussion
- Elizabeth Sun – Percussion

=== Additional musicians ===
- Andra Ursuta – Vocals on track 1 and 6
- Pedro Erazo – Backing Vocals on track 3
- Ori Kaplan – Saxophone on track 5
