= Sally (Gogol Bordello song) =

Single by Gogol Bordello

from the album Gypsy Punks: Underdog World Strike
- Released: February 2006
- Recorded: 2004–2005
- Genre: Gypsy punk
- Length: 3:02
- Label: SideOneDummy Records
- Songwriter: Eugene Hütz
- Producer: Steve Albini

Gogol Bordello singles chronology
"When the Trickster Starts a-Poking" (2002)	"Start Wearing Purple" / "Sally" (2006)	"Not a Crime" (2006)

"Sally" is a song by gypsy punk band Gogol Bordello, written by frontman Eugene Hütz. The song was packaged as a double single along with "Start Wearing Purple", and released as the band's second single in February 2006. It belongs to their third album Gypsy Punks: Underdog World Strike.

== Meaning ==
The song talks about a Cultural Revolution, and implies that this also belongs to the younger generations. In 2009 the band held an open competition to design Sally drawings.

The Sally character is also mentioned in the band's song "Avenue B", which is featured in the same album.
