= When the Trickster Starts a-Poking =

Single by Gogol Bordello

from the album Multi Kontra Culti vs. Irony
- Released: 2002
- Genre: Gypsy punk
- Length: 5:06
- Label: Rubric Records
- Songwriter(s): Eugene Hütz
- Producer(s): Gogol Bordello

Gogol Bordello singles chronology
"When the Trickster Starts a-Poking" (2002)	"Start Wearing Purple" / "Sally" (2006)

"When the Trickster Starts a-Poking (Bordello Kind of Guy)" is a song by gypsy punk band Gogol Bordello, written by frontman Eugene Hütz. The song was the band's first single, and both tracks appear on their second album Multi Kontra Culti vs. Irony, released on 17 September 2002. The single has remained in print since its release, despite not containing any exclusive tracks.

== Track listing ==
- CDs RUB35
1. "When the Trickster Starts A-Poking (Bordello Kind of Guy)" (5:06)
2. "Occurrence on the Border" (3:26)
