= We Mean It, Man! =

Studio album by Gogol Bordello
- Released: February 13, 2026
- Genre: Gypsy punk; post-punk; folk punk
- Length: 48:20
- Label: Casa Gogol Records
- Producer: Nick Launay; Adam "Atom" Greenspan

Gogol Bordello chronology
Solidaritine (2022)	We Mean It, Man! (2026)

Singles from We Mean It, Man!
- 1. "We Mean It, Man!" Released: 2025; 2. "Hater Liquidator" Released: November 18, 2025

Professional ratings
Review scores
Source	Rating
Louder Than War	4/5 stars
Spectrum Culture	4/5 stars
Noizze UK	8/10
The Needle Drop	8/10

We Mean It, Man! is the ninth studio album by Gypsy punk band Gogol Bordello, released on February 13, 2026, via Casa Gogol Records, the label run by frontman Eugene Hütz. It is the band's first studio album since 2022's Solidaritine. The album was co-produced by Nick Launay and Adam "Atom" Greenspan.

== Background and recording ==
In an interview with Salt Lake Magazine, Hütz said that the band had previously neglected certain punk rock and post-punk influences that were central to Gogol Bordello's origins, and that the new album was a deliberate effort to reconnect with those roots. In a statement on the band's official website, Hütz said: "This album brings all original inspirations of Gogol Bordello together more than any other: punk, hardcore, synth punk, Gypsy music. I never saw them as separate cookie jars — we are cross-pollinators. [...] I believe that the new album is the best Frankenstein we've done since 'Gypsy Punks.'" The album makes prominent use of synthesizers, which reviewers noted had not been so central since their 2005 album Gypsy Punks: Underdog World Strike.

The album features two new members: synth and accordion player Erica Mancini and guitarist Leo Mintek. Gogol Bordello also featured two fellow Casa Gogol Records artists as guest performers: Grace Bergere on "Boiling Point" and Puzzled Panther on "From Boyarka to Boyaca." The closing track, "Solidarity (Nick Launay Mix)," features Bernard Sumner of New Order and is based on a song originally recorded by the Angelic Upstarts, itself derived from a 1976 Polish protest song, with lyrics rewritten by Hütz to address the Russian invasion of Ukraine.

== Singles ==
According to the band's press release, the title track "We Mean It, Man!" was released as the lead single ahead of the album announcement, followed by "Hater Liquidator" as the second single on November 18, 2025. Further singles included "Ignition," the music video for which features actor Liev Schreiber, and "Life Is Possible Again." On the album's release date, the band held a release party with Spin magazine at Silver Linings Lounge in New York City. The band also announced a North American tour in support of the album.

== Critical reception ==
We Mean It, Man! received generally positive reviews. Writing for Louder Than War, Robert Plummer named it his Album of the Week and called it "the most intensely focused album Gogol Bordello have ever made." Punktastic's Kate Allvey called it "the band's best album in a decade," writing that the album succeeded in translating the intensity of their live shows to a studio recording in a way earlier albums had not. Spin called it "Gogol Bordello's most vital and engaging record since Gypsy Punks." Noizze UK's Sean Jolly, who gave the album 8 out of 10, praised its shift away from the band's characteristic frenetic style toward a tighter, more disciplined sound. Daniel Aaron of The Needle Drop awarded the album 8 out of 10.

Spectrum Culture gave the album 4 out of 5 stars, characterizing it as an energetic post-punk record that moved away from the harder-edged guitar sound of Solidaritine. Writing for the Oberlin Review, Leo Slattery offered a more mixed assessment, finding the album somewhat disappointing relative to the band's back catalogue, while still recognizing it as evidence of the group's enduring vitality and willingness to experiment.

== Track listing ==
All track written by Eugene Hütz except State of Shock, written by The Ex / Tom Cora / Hütz, and From Boyarka to Boyaca, written by Puzzled Panther / Hütz.

No.	Title	Length
1.	"We Mean It, Man!"	3:46
2.	"Life Is Possible Again"	3:38
3.	"No Time for Idiots"	5:03
4.	"Hater Liquidator"	3:37
5.	"Boiling Point" (featuring Grace Bergere)	4:13
6.	"Ignition"	4:26
7.	"From Boyarka to Boyaca" (featuring Puzzled Panther)	5:01
8.	"Mystics"	4:55
9.	"We Did Good with the Good We Did"	3:43
10.	"Crayons"	2:16
11.	"State of Shock"	3:49
12.	"Solidarity (Nick Launay Mix)" (featuring Bernard Sumner)	3:53
Total length:		48:20

== Personnel ==
Credits are adapted from the official press release and liner notes (note: the personnel credits in the liner notes are handwritten and sometimes unclear).

Gogol Bordello

- Eugene Hütz – vocals, guitar
- Korey Kingston Horn - drums
- Erica Mancini – accordion and keyboards
- Leo Mintek – guitar
- Georgios Pesios - bass
- Sergey Ryabtsev – violin
- Pedro Segovia Erazo - Percussion

Guest musicians

- Grace Bergere – vocals (track 5)
- Puzzled Panther (Victoria Espinoza and Kay BonTempo) – vocals (track 7, 10)
- Bernard Sumner – vocals and synth programming (there appears to be a contradiction in the liner notes on which track he appears on, with the "performers" notes crediting Sumner for track 5 Boiling Point while the album tracklist credits him for track 12, Solidarity. The official press release and most media sources credit him with the latter.)
- Yuri Yunakov - saxophone (track 1)
- Greg Foreman aka "The Pharmacist" - synthesizer (track 6, 8, 11)
- Smidge Malone - trumpet (track 11)
- Mark Hagy - trombone (track 11)
- Ben Golder-Novick [note: text unclear] - saxophone (track 11)
- Cassandra Church - backing vocals (track 11)

Production

- Nick Launay – producer, mixing (track 12)
- Adam "Atom" Greenspan – producer
