= Start Wearing Purple =

Single by Gogol Bordello

from the album Gypsy Punks: Underdog World Strike
- Released: February 2006
- Recorded: 2004–2005
- Genre: Gypsy punk
- Length: 3:42
- Label: SideOneDummy Records
- Songwriter: Eugene Hütz
- Producer: Steve Albini

Gogol Bordello singles chronology
"When the Trickster Starts a-Poking" (2002)	"Start Wearing Purple" / "Sally" (2006)	"Not a Crime" (2006)

"Start Wearing Purple" is a song by gypsy punk band Gogol Bordello, written by frontman Eugene Hütz. The song was packaged as a double single along with "Sally", and released as the band's second single in February 2006. It appears on their third album Gypsy Punks: Underdog World Strike. This version is a re-recording of the initial one which was featured in the band's first album, 1999's Voi-La Intruder. It also appears in the soundtrack for the 2005 film Everything Is Illuminated, in which Hütz stars as Alex.

The song was later featured in the 2024 animated television series Creature Commandos.

== Music video ==
The video starts with Hütz wearing ladies shoes, and singing and dancing in the streets. This is followed by images of the band and many people dancing around while consuming copious amounts of alcohol.

== Composition ==
Hütz said in an interview, "It's one of the very few songs I wrote for a girl. I just moved in with my girlfriend in New York. We had a neighbour: an old woman who was always dressed in purple head to toe. She was clearly bonkers. So whenever my girlfriend and I had an argument and she would start screaming at me, I would say: you might as well start wearing purple now".

== Cover versions ==
- Covered live by Vernian Process
- Covered by the James Madison University Pep Band, its full marching band Marching Royal Dukes, and has become a de facto team song at James Madison Dukes sporting events. It has also been adopted by the Stephen F. Austin State University marching band as well.
- Has become a de facto team song of Major League Soccer team Orlando City SC.
