= Everything Is Illuminated =

2002 novel by Jonathan Safran Foer

- Front cover of hardcover edition.
- Author: Jonathan Safran Foer
- Cover artist: Jon Gray (aka gray318)
- Language: English
- Genre: Novel
- Publisher: Houghton Mifflin
- Publication date: April 16, 2002
- Publication place: United States
- Media type: Print (hardback & paperback)
- ISBN: 0-618-17387-0 (hardcover)
- OCLC: 48144414
- Dewey Decimal: 813/.6 21
- LC Class: PS3606.O38 E84 2002

Everything Is Illuminated is the first novel by the American writer Jonathan Safran Foer, published in 2002. It was adapted into a film of the same name starring Elijah Wood and Eugene Hütz in 2005.

The book's writing and structure received critical acclaim for the manner in which it switches between two stories, both of which are autobiographical. One of them is the fictionalized history of the eradicated town of Trochenbrod (Trachimbrod), a real exclusively Jewish shtetl in Poland before the Holocaust where the author's grandfather was born. The second narrative encompasses Foer's trip to Ukraine in search of the remnants and memories of Trachimbrod as well as the author's writing-in-progress.

== Historical background ==
The real town of Trochenbrod was an exclusively Jewish shtetl located in Western Ukraine. After the German attack on the Soviet Union in the 1941, a Nazi ghetto was established at Trochenbrod for local residents including those from nearby villages. The ghetto was exterminated during the Holocaust. In August and September 1942, nearly all Jews of Trochenbrod were murdered by the German security troops with assistance from the Ukrainian Auxiliary Police who rounded up Jews. An estimated 3,000 to 4,000 Jews were murdered, including those from nearby Lozisht.

== Plot summary ==
Jonathan Safran Foer (the author), a young American Jew, who is vegetarian and an avid collector of his family's heritage, journeys to Ukraine in search of Augustine, the woman who saved his grandfather's life during the Nazi liquidation of Trachimbrod, his family shtetl (a small town) in occupied eastern Poland. Armed with maps, cigarettes and many copies of an old photograph of Augustine and his grandfather, Jonathan begins his search with the help from Ukrainian native and soon-to-be good friend, Alexander "Alex" Perchov, who is Foer's age and very fond of American pop culture, albeit culture that is already out of date in the United States. Alexander studied English at his university, and even though his knowledge of the language is not "first-rate", he becomes Foer's translator. Alex's "blind" grandfather and his "deranged seeing-eye bitch," Sammy Davis, Jr., Jr., accompany them on their journey. Interspersed throughout the book is the story that Jonathan Safran Foer (the character) learns about his ancestors—namely, his great-times-five-or-six grandmother Brod and his grandfather Safran. Brod has a magical, maybe-virgin birth, when she, as a baby, bobs to the surface after her father dies in a wagon accident in the river Brod, for which the baby is later named. A man named Yankel raises her until he dies.

== Literary significance and criticism ==
Upon its initial release the book received enthusiastic reviews, particularly in The Times, which stated that Foer had "staked his claim for literary greatness.".

== Awards and honors ==
- 2001 National Jewish Book Award, winner
- 2002 Guardian First Book Award, winner
- 2002 New York Times Bestseller
- 2002 Amazon.com Best Books
- 2003 Young Lions Fiction Award, winner
- 2003 William Saroyan International Prize for Writing, winner
- 2004 PEN/Robert W. Bingham Prize, co-winner
- 2007 Pajiba's Best Books of the Generation (Readers' List), no.8.
