= Wonderlust King =

Single by Gogol Bordello

from the album Super Taranta!
- Released: August 2007
- Genre: Gypsy punk
- Length: 3:58
- Label: SideOneDummy Records
- Songwriter: Eugene Hütz
- Producer: Victor Van Vugt

Gogol Bordello singles chronology
"Not a Crime" (2006)	"Wonderlust King" (2007)

"Wonderlust King" is a song by gypsy punk band Gogol Bordello, written by frontman Eugene Hütz. It was released as the only single from 2007's Super Taranta!, and it was their fourth single overall. The title is a deliberate malapropism or catachresis of the word wanderlust.

== Music video ==
The video consists of footage of Romani people from the Carpaty region of Ukraine, taken from the documentary The Pied Piper of Hützovina. It also includes images of Hütz singing and playing guitar on the boardwalk of Coney Island and against a map, jumping, among other things.

== Cultural references ==
The song is played in a flashback sequence from the animated superhero TV series Creature Commandos, detailing the origins of the character Doctor Phosphorus.
