= Voi-La Intruder =

Studio album by Gogol Bordello
- Released: 1999
- Genre: Folk punk, punk rock, gypsy punk
- Length: 56:58
- Label: Rubric; Sunken Bell
- Producer: Jim Sclavunos, Gogol Bordello

Gogol Bordello chronology
| Voi-La Intruder (1999) | Multi Kontra Culti vs. Irony (2002) |

Professional ratings
Review scores
| Source | Rating |
|---|---|
| Robert Christgau | (1-star Honorable Mention) |

Voi-La Intruder is the debut album by Gogol Bordello. It was released in 1999 by Rubric Records.

== Track listing ==
| No. | Title | Length |
|---|---|---|
| 1. | "Sacred Darling" | 1:48 |
| 2. | "Voi-La Intruder" | 3:07 |
| 3. | "Greencard Husband" | 2:20 |
| 4. | "Passport" | 4:21 |
| 5. | "Start Wearing Purple" | 3:25 |
| 6. | "Shy Kind of Guy" | 3:27 |
| 7. | "Mussolini vs. Stalin" | 2:43 |
| 8. | "Letter to Mother" | 3:50 |
| 9. | "God-Like" | 5:33 |
| 10. | "Nomadic Chronicle" | 4:22 |
| 11. | "Letter to Castro (Costumes for Tonight)" | 3:21 |
| 12. | "Unvisible Zedd" | 4:27 |
| 13. | "Sex Spider" | 3:07 |
| 14. | "No Threat" | 3:32 |
| 15. | "Against the Nature" | 7:22 |

== Notes ==
The album is composed in two Movements.

- Tracks 1–10 are Movement One - Songs of Immigration, appx. 35.01 min.
- Tracks 11–15 are Movement Two - Optzay Pertruder, appx. 23.44 min.
- "Start Wearing Purple" was later re-recorded for Gogol Bordello's third album Gypsy Punks: Underdog World Strike.
- "Nomadic Chronicle" uses lyrics from the song "Jung 'N' Crazee", which had been recorded by Eugene Hutz's previous band The Fags. In addition, "Letter to Castro (Costumes for Tonight)" uses lyrics from The Fags song "Stadium Rock". Both songs appeared on The Fags' independently released album No Fleas, Lunch Money and Gold Teeth, released in 1995.
- The song "Letter to Mother" is based on a poem by Sergei Yesenin entitled "A Letter to Mother".
