= Super Taranta! =

Studio album by Gogol Bordello
- Released: July 10, 2007
- Genre: Folk punk, Punk rock, Gypsy punk, Dub music
- Length: 62:44
- Label: SideOneDummy
- Producer: Victor Van Vugt, Gogol Bordello

Gogol Bordello chronology
Gypsy Punks Underdog World Strike (2005)	Super Taranta! (2007)	Trans-Continental Hustle (2010)

Professional ratings
Aggregate scores
Source	Rating
Metacritic	80/100 link
Review scores
Source	Rating
AllMusic	link
Pitchfork	5.2/10 link
Q	4/5 stars
Robert Christgau	A+ link
Rolling Stone	link

Super Taranta! is the fourth album by Gypsy punk band Gogol Bordello. It was released on July 10, 2007 by SideOneDummy Records, produced by the band and Victor Van Vugt. The album charted in several countries, including reaching #67 in the UK and #115 on the US Billboard 200. "Wonderlust King" was released as the album's only single, in August 2007.

== Reception ==
The album was ranked #14 on Rolling Stone's list of the Top 50 Albums of 2007, and the track "Ultimate" was #82 on the magazine's list of the 100 Best Songs of 2007.

Super Taranta! has a score of 80/100 on the review aggregator Metacritic, indicating "generally favorable reviews". Music critic Robert Christgau gave the album an A+ rating, calling Gogol Bordello "the world's most visionary band".

== Track listing ==
All lyrics are written by Eugene Hütz; all music is composed by Eugene Hütz and Gogol Bordello.

No.	Title	Length
1.	"Ultimate"	3:29
2.	"Wonderlust King"	3:58
3.	"Zina-Marina"	4:19
4.	"Supertheory of Supereverything"	2:56
5.	"Harem in Tuscany (Taranta)"	3:33
6.	"Dub the Frequencies of Love"	6:15
7.	"My Strange Uncles from Abroad"	5:19
8.	"Tribal Connection"	5:05
9.	"Forces of Victory"	5:23
10.	"Alcohol"	4:54
11.	"Suddenly... (I Miss Carpaty)"	5:36
12.	"Your Country"	4:15
13.	"American Wedding"	3:38
14.	"Super Taranta!"	6:44

iTunes Bonus Track
No.	Title	Length
15.	"Masha"	2:56

== Production ==
- Produced by Victor Van Vugt and Gogol Bordello
- Recorded by Victor Van Vugt at Long View Farm Studios, March '07
- Additional recordings done at Grace Studios, NY and Integrated Studios, NY, March/April '07
- Assistant Engineers: Josh Sadlier-Brown, Integrated Studios and Ian Neil, Long View Farm Recording Studios
- Mixed by Victor Van Vugt and Eugene Hütz at Grace Studios, NY
- Mastered by Emily Lazar at The Lodge
- Design by Cindy Heller
- Photos by Bela Borsodi, Keetja Allard, Danny North, Liubov Kulkova, Herman Dahlgren, Thomas Gobena, and Eric James Crawford

== Personnel ==
The Band

- Eugene Hütz – vocals, acoustic guitar, percussion, fire buckets
- Eliot Ferguson – drums, backing vocals
- Thomas "Tommy T" Gobena – bass, backing vocals
- Oren Kaplan – guitar, backing vocals
- Sergey Ryabtsev – violin, backing vocals
- Yuri Lemeshev – accordion, backing vocals
- Pasha – accordion, backing vocals
- Pamela Jintana Racine – percussion, backing vocals
- Elizabeth Sun – percussion, backing vocals

Guests

- Pedro Erazo – additional vocals on "Forces of Victory"
- Piroshka Rac – additional vocals on "Suddenly... (I Miss Carpaty)"
- Slavic Soul Party – brass on "Zina-Marina" and "American Wedding"
  - Ben Holmes – truba
  - John Carlson – truba
  - Jacob Garchik – baritone truba
  - Curtis Hasselbring – trombone
  - Matt Moran – bubanj

== Charts ==
Chart	Peak position
Finnish Albums (Suomen virallinen lista)	38
Dutch Albums (Album Top 100)	99
Italian Albums (FIMI)	67
Norwegian Albums (VG-lista)	26
Swedish Albums (Sverigetopplistan)	52
Scottish Albums (OCC)	78
UK Albums (OCC)	67
UK Album Downloads (OCC)	36
UK Independent Albums (OCC)	3
US Billboard 200	115

== In popular culture ==
"American Wedding" is heard at the end of the Fargo episode "The Principle of Restricted Choice".

The song "Wonderlust King" is played in a sequence from animated superhero TV series Creature Commandos detailing the origins of character Doctor Phosphorus.
