= MRDS =

MRDS may refer to:

- McArthur Retail Development Specialists
- Microsoft Robotics Developer Studio
- a Member of the Royal Dublin Society
- Monster Rancher DS
- Marching Royal Dukes, the marching band of James Madison University
