= Laryssa Lauret =

Ukrainian-American Broadway and television actress (1939–2015)

- Лариса Лоре
- Born: Larysa Kukrycka; August 9, 1939; Warsaw, Poland
- Died: July 5, 2015 (aged 75); New York, New York, United States
- Other names: Laryssa Lysniak

Laryssa Lauret (married name: Laryssa Lysniak, (Note: Ukrainian: Лариса Лисняк, romanized: Larysa Lysniak) née Kukrycka; (Note: Ukrainian: Кукрицька, romanized: Kukrytska) August 9, 1939 – July 5, 2015) was an American actress of Ukrainian descent. She worked on Broadway and off Broadway, as well as in television in long-running roles, such as Dr. Karen Werner in The Doctors and for one season of Guiding Light as Simone Morey. Her most notable film role was for Everything Is Illuminated as Lista. In 2013, she took on the role as Pavla in the Netflix original series Orange is the New Black.

Lauret died on July 5, 2015, in New York. At the time of her death, she was married to her husband of over fifty years, Wolodymyr Lysniak. With Lysniak, Lauret had two daughters, Ula and Lada.

== Filmography ==
- Guiding Light as Simone Kincaid (1977-78)
- The Parisienne and the Prudes (1964) (Ingrid)
- The Doctors (1963 TV series) as Dr. Karen Werner Aldrich (1967-1975)
- Everything Is Illuminated (film)
- Orange Is The New Black
- Gods Behaving Badly (film)
