= Await Further Instructions =

British horror film

- Release poster
- Directed by: Johnny Kevorkian
- Written by: Gavin Williams
- Produced by: Alan Latham; Jack Tarling
- Starring: Sam Gittins; Neerja Naik; Grant Masters; Abigail Cruttenden; Holly Weston; Kris Saddler; David Bradley
- Cinematography: Annika Summerson
- Edited by: Richard Smither
- Music by: Richard Wells
- Production company: Dark Sky Films
- Distributed by: Shudder
- Release date: 5 October 2018
- Running time: 91 minutes
- Country: United Kingdom
- Language: English
- Box office: $3,617

Await Further Instructions is a 2018 British science-fiction horror film written by Gavin Williams and directed by Johnny Kevorkian. The film follows the members of a dysfunctional family who are trapped in their house on Christmas by a mysterious black membrane that begins to send them cryptic instructions through text that appears on their television.

== Plot ==
Nick travels to the home of his estranged parents, Tony and Beth, to spend Christmas there and introduce the family to his girlfriend Annji. His pregnant sister Kate, her husband Scott, and his grandfather are also there. Tensions arise after Kate and the grandfather make racist remarks to Annji, who is of Indian descent.

The family members quickly find that they are surrounded by a strange black substance and that they cannot leave the home. They receive messages warning that their food is contaminated and instructing them to cleanse themselves with bleach and take vaccines dropped down their chimney. Annji is suspicious of the vaccines as the syringes look used, but Tony forces everyone to inject them. The grandfather suddenly vomits a black liquid and dies.

The living room television shows lines of text claiming one of them is infected. Believing Annji is infected, despite Nick's protests, the rest of the family lock her in a bedroom with the grandfather's corpse. Kate urges Scott to attack Nick, but she is injured in the chaos. Trying to find an escape, Nick locks himself in a room, attaches his phone to a long stick and uses it to record the view outside the house, capturing footage of a snake-like creature.

Prompted by the television, Tony and Scott rush in, knock Nick unconscious, and drag him downstairs. The television tells them that Nick is a spy and that they must get information from him. Tony refuses to look at the phone footage and tortures Nick until Beth interrupts them to let them know that Kate has died.

The surviving family members are told to return to the first floor as the television is activating quarantine. Nick is able to get Annji downstairs but is unable to save Beth, who dies after being exposed to a mysterious black smoke. Nick and Annji rush downstairs to find the television shining a bright light. Even as Nick unplugs it, the light stays on and the house begins shaking. The television proclaims that it is being "resurrected" just before Nick passes out.

Nick awakens to find that himself and Annji restrained, to be sacrificed. Tony attempts to kill Annji with an axe but Nick and Scott stop him. Tony murders Scott with the axe. After a brief fight, Nick crushes Tony's head with the television. Black wires crawl out of the television and enter Tony's head, taking control of his corpse.

Nick and Annji realize that the black substance is composed entirely of the living wires. Nick destroys the television, only to learn the wires can survive without it. Tony, being controlled by the wires, kills Nick and Annji with the axe. The wires digest Kate's body, leaving only her skeletal remains and her newborn baby.

Tony brings in another television, which names the baby "Ruby." It displays colourful patterns to get Ruby's attention before changing to text that says "worship me". Outside, it is revealed that every single house has been wrapped in the same black wires.

== Cast ==
- Sam Gittins as Nick Milgram
- Neerja Naik as Annji
- Grant Masters as Tony Milgram
- Abigail Cruttenden as Beth Milgram
- Holly Weston as Kate Milgram
- Kris Saddler as Scott
- David Bradley as Grandad

== Production ==
Await Further Instructions follows a family being forced into an obedience experiment by an unearthly entity; the family's surname of Milgram is a reference to the infamous Milgram obedience experiment, while their home is located on Stanford Street in a reference to the Stanford prison experiment. The script was written by Gavin Williams, with director Johnny Kevorkian stating that he chose to direct the film as "it was so different to the usual stuff that comes across [his] desk". Williams began writing the script after listening to the song "Apartment Story" by The National, taking inspiration from the lyric: "Stay indoors until somebody finds you / Do whatever the TV tells you." Filming took place in Yorkshire.

== Reception ==
=== Box office ===
Await Further Instructions was released by American streaming platform Shudder. It grossed $3,618 worldwide with an additional $35,152 from home media sales as of July 2023.

=== Critical response ===
Await Further Instructions received an 81% on Rotten Tomatoes from 21 reviews. The site's consensus reads: "A yuletide nightmare full of familial angst and slithering scares, Await Further Instructions is a genre treat that pretty much any horror fan will want in their stocking". The film was named a Critic's Pick by The New York Times. It received a 1.5/4 star review from Simon Abrams for RogerEbert.com and a 3/5 star review from Cath Clarke for The Guardian. Abrams and Clarke both criticise the final section of the film, with Abrams stating that it "completely falls apart" and "not only stops making sense on a dramatic level, but a symbolic one", and Clarke feeling that despite interesting ideas, the film "throws it away with the same old horror film cliches in a finale that fails to satisfy the buildup". Abrams also disliked the "one-dimensional" characters, "uniformly flat" acting, "dull" cinematography, and the way the film's "half-baked" social critique about the power of television "doesn't have anything intelligible to say". Matt Donato reviewed it for Dread Central, stating that it "launches into survivalist psychotics that embrace walled-in escalation, always building towards that finale [...] the ride is filled with highs and lows, but damn if Johnny Kevorkian doesn't stick that landing".
