= Holly Weston =

English actress

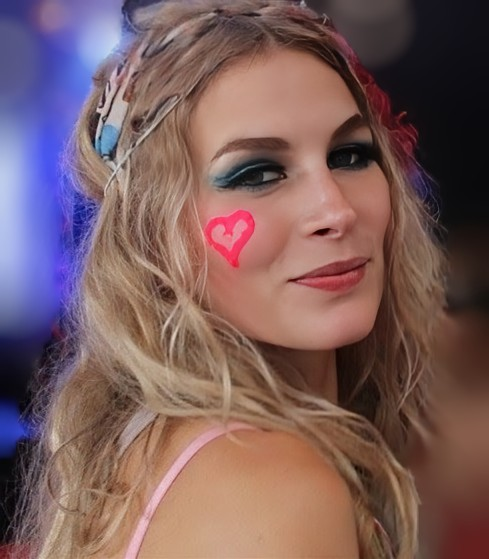
- Born: 30 August 1985 (age 40); Putney, London, England
- Occupation: Actress
- Years active: 2003–present

Holly Weston is an English actress. She is known for her role as Ash Kane in the British television soap opera Hollyoaks. Weston also played the lead roles in feature films Filth and Wisdom and Splintered.

== Early life ==
Weston was born in Putney, London, England. Weston began acting as a child. She trained in dance at the Urdang Academy, she also trained in acting at the Anna Scher Theatre before training at the Mountview Academy of Theatre Arts. After Weston was cast in Hollyoaks she relocated to Liverpool where the serial is filmed.

== Career ==
In 2003 Weston appeared in Mouth to Mouth as Claire. Weston was later cast as the lead role in Filth and Wisdom, which was the directorial debut of Madonna. She played Holly, a ballet dancer working as a stripper and pole dancer. The film was initially planned to be a short film, but as it was filmed it became a feature-length film. Weston was later cast in the lead role in horror film Splintered, in which she played teenager Sophie. Weston has also appeared in film Mouth to Mouth as Claire before appearing as the corpse of Carter's wife in John Carter.

Weston has also appeared as Grace in Harley Street, as Sadie in Law & Order: UK, as Fleur in Off the Hook, as Kelly Robe in Wall of Silence, as Julie in Killing Time, Leah in White Heat and as Lara Stone in The Impressions Show.

On 5 September 2011 it was announced that Weston had been cast in a regular role in Hollyoaks as Ash Kane. Weston said she was initially signed to a six-month contract, which was a "trial period". Producers then decided to keep the character on. For her portrayal of Ash, Weston was nominated for "Best Actress" at the 2012 British Soap Awards. She later received a "Best Actress" nomination at the 2012 TV Choice Awards.

Weston has also done voice-over work and appeared in the music videos for "Lonely Girl" by Sandi Thom and "The Test" by Chemical Brothers.

== Filmography ==
Year	Title	Role	Notes
2003	Mouth to Mouth	Claire	
2004	Wall of Silence	Kelly Robe	TV Movie
2005	Murder in Suburbia	Holly Andrews	Episode: “Witches”
2006	A Love Too Tempting	Brenda	
2006	C**T	Laura	
2007	Silver Trees	Holly	
2008	All That's Left		
2008	Filth and Wisdom	Holly	
2008	Harley Street	Grace	TV Series
2009	Off the Hook	Fleur	TV Series
2009	A Day with Jessie	Jessie	
2010	Splintered	Sophie	
2010	Law & Order: UK	Sadie	Episode: “Hounded”
2011	Gangster Kitten	Crack Girl 2	
2011	The Impressions Show	Lara Stone	
2011—2013	Hollyoaks	Ash Kane	TV Series
2011	Killing Time	Julie	
2012	Edelweiss	Polly	
2012	John Carter	John Carter's Wife	
2012	White Heat	Leah	
2013	Dementamania	Laura Harrington	
2014	Casualty	Amy Webster	Episode: “Valentines Day Mascara”
2015	Assassin	Chloe	
2015	Howl	Ellen	
2016	The Collection	Flor	TV Series
2018	Father Brown	Lucy Dawes	Episode: “The Dance of Death”
2018	Await Further Instructions	Kate	
