= Filth and Wisdom =

2008 film by Madonna

- Directed by: Madonna
- Written by: Madonna; Dan Cadan
- Produced by: Nicola Doring
- Starring: Eugene Hütz; Holly Weston; Vicky McClure; Richard E. Grant; Olegar Fedoro
- Cinematography: Tim Maurice Jones
- Edited by: Russell Icke
- Production companies: Semtex Films; HSI London
- Distributed by: IFC Films
- Release dates: 13 February 2008 (Berlin International Film Festival); 17 October 2008 (limited release)
- Running time: 81 minutes
- Country: United Kingdom
- Languages: English; Russian
- Box office: $354,628

Filth and Wisdom is a 2008 British comedy-drama film directed by Madonna, starring Eugene Hütz, Holly Weston, Vicky McClure and Richard E. Grant. It was filmed on location in London, England, from 14 to 29 May 2007. Locations included two actual strip clubs in Hammersmith and Swiss Cottage; both owned by the Secrets Clubs chain. Additional scenes were shot in July 2007.

The film premiered at the Berlin International Film Festival on 13 February 2008 which was attended by Madonna and cast members Hütz, Weston and McClure. It received generally negative reviews from critics. On 17 October 2008 the film went into limited release, as well as being simultaneously released "On Demand" on most cable providers. It is the first motion picture production for Madonna's company, Semtex Films.

== Plot ==
Described as a comedy/drama/musical/romance, the story revolves around a Ukrainian immigrant named A.K. who finances his dreams of rock glory by moonlighting as a cross-dressing dominatrix and his two female flatmates: Holly, a ballet dancer who works as a stripper and pole-dancer at a local club and Juliette, a pharmacy assistant who dreams of going to Africa to help starving children.

== Production ==
The Gypsy punk band that appears in the film is portrayed by real-life Gypsy punk band, Gogol Bordello, who also contributed three songs to the film's soundtrack. The band's lead singer, Hütz, portrays the main character; a character with a philosophical attitude towards life. Madonna included additional dialogue written by Hütz.

== Reception ==
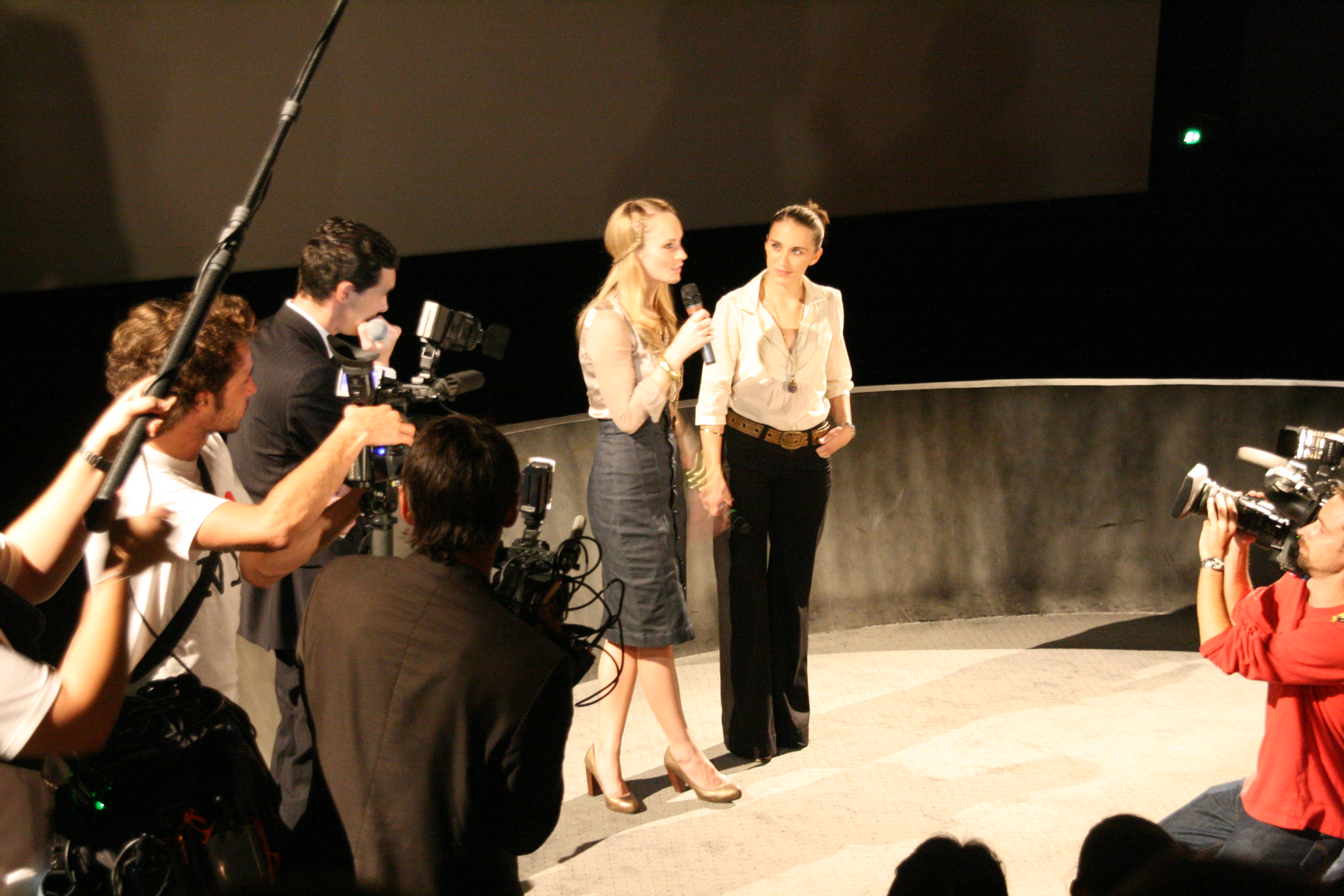
Filth and Wisdom premiere in Paris

Filth and Wisdom debuted in Berlin International Film Festival with mixed reviews. On the review aggregate website Rotten Tomatoes, it holds a 24% approval rating, based on 62 reviews with an average rating of 3.94/10. The website's critics consensus reads: "Filth and Wisdom, while certainly ambitious, is mostly unconvincing and incoherent." Metacritic, which uses a weighted average, assigned the film a score of 26 out of 100, based on 21 critics, indicating "generally unfavorable" reviews. The Times Online claimed, "Madonna has done herself proud" and The Telegraph described the film as "not an entirely unpromising first effort" but went on to say "Madonna would do well to hang on to her day job." Peter Bradshaw of The Guardian wrote, "Well, it had to happen. Madonna has been a terrible actor in many, many films and now – fiercely aspirational as ever – she has graduated to being a terrible director." Jonathan Romney of Screen International called the film "a good-humoured, averagely average vanity project" and "a cheap and cheerful comedy," adding that "Madonna simply cannot direct actors." The New Yorker's Anthony Lane panned the film, saying that "in technical terms, more professional productions than this are filmed and cut on iMovie, by ten-year-olds, a thousand times a day" and that "if the actors were paid according to their talents, they cannot have cost more than forty bucks."

== Cast ==
- Ade as DJ
- Olegar Fedoro as A.K.'s Father
- Eugene Hütz as A.K.
- Holly Weston as Holly
- Vicky McClure as Juliette
- Richard E. Grant as Professor Flynn
- Stephen Graham as Harry Beechman
- Inder Manocha as Sardeep
- Shobu Kapoor as Sardeep's wife
- Elliot Levey as Businessman
- Clare Wilkie as Chloe
- Hannah Walters as Businessman's wife
