= Gogol Bordello Non-Stop =

2008 film by Margarita Jimeno

- Directed by: Margarita Jimeno
- Written by: Margarita Jimeno
- Produced by: Margarita Jimeno; Darya Zhuk; Munir Maluf Raad
- Starring: Eugene Hütz; Gogol Bordello; Manu Chao
- Cinematography: Margarita Jimeno
- Edited by: Jenny Golden; Margarita Jimeno
- Music by: Gogol Bordello; Manu Chao; Yuri Yunakov
- Distributed by: Kino Lorber International
- Release dates: February 2, 2008 (Gothenburg Film Festival); September 11, 2009 (United States)
- Running time: 89 minutes
- Country: United States
- Languages: English, Russian, Ukrainian

Gogol Bordello Non-Stop is a 2008 music documentary film, written and directed by Margarita Jimeno and starring Gogol Bordello and Eugene Hütz.

== Synopsis ==
Chronicles the Gypsy-punk band Gogol Bordello and front man Eugene Hütz, a Ukrainian immigrant. Includes footage of raucous live shows from 2001 to 2007, as the band begins in dingy basement venues and eventually gains fame on international stages.

== Critical response ==
“In Gogol Bordello Non-Stop Eugene Hutz emerges as a passionate, articulate philosopher of punk’s democratic participatory aesthetic who espouses the rejection of social hierarchies in concerts that are raucous, bacchanalian performance-art carnivals.” — Stephen Holden, The New York Times

- New York Times Review
- New York Post Review
- Village Voice Review
- IFC Review

== Awards ==
- 2009: BEST FILM AWARD MUSIXINE Finland

“Margarita managed to not only portray a band, but also the social aspects of being an immigrant and taking the responsibility to play with identities. Also the film is fresh, enjoyable and punk". The Jury

The jury consisted of three members; Johannes Klein, the head of the Jury and the International Programming Coordinator of the In Edit International Music Documentary and Film Festival in Barcelona; Jouko Aaltonen, a Finnish director specialising in documentaries and Laura M. Kiralfy, a manager of Filmkontakt Nord Nordisk Forum for Co-Financing of Documentaries during Nordisk Panorama 5 Cities Film Festival.

- 2008: AUDIENCE AWARD MOFFOM, Czech Republic
- 2008: SOUND AND VISION AWARD, SPECIAL MENTION CPH:DOX Denmark

== Film Festival Official Selection ==
=== 2009 ===
5th Ambulante, Mexico
7th Big Sky Documentary Film Festival, USA
16th Noise Pop Film Festival, USA
16th Titanic Film Festival, Hungary
14th Vilnius International Film Festival, Lithuania
Rockumentary Groove – revija rock dokumentaraca, Croatia
DORF Vinkovci, Croatia
40th Nashville Film Festival, USA
Sensoria, England
Doc Aviv, Israel
Big Rivers Film festival, The Netherlands
Musixine Competition, Oulu Finland
Raindance, London, England
Bergen International Film Festival, Bergen Norway
Easternxpress Film Festival, Uppsala, Sweden
Rolling Film Festival Pristina. Serbia
Shoot me, The Hague, The Netherlands
Rokumentti, Helsinki Finland
Molodist, Kiev Ukrania
Cinemania, Sofia Bulgaria
In-Edit, Santiago Chile

=== 2008 ===
31st Göteborg International Film Festival, Sweden
26th Filmfest München, Germany
35th Ghent International Film Festival, Belgium
22nd AFI Fest, USA
21st Helsinki International Film Festival, Finland
5th Music on Film Film on Music, Czech republic
5th CPH:DOX Copenhagen, Denmark
21st Exground Film Festival, Germany
European Social Forum Malmo, Sweden
International Film Festival Bratislava, Slovakia
