= Trochenbrod =

Former shtetl in Wołyń Voivodeship, Ukraine

Trochinbrod
- Shtetl (completely destroyed)
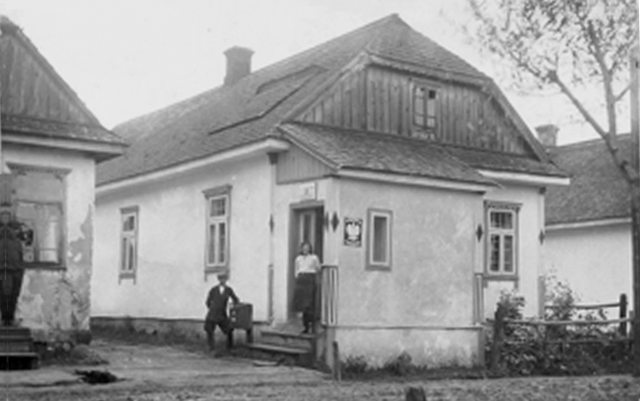
- Zofiówka Post Office before the Holocaust and Shtetl's meticulous eradication

- Zofiówka location in World War II, east of Łuck

- Location of eradicated town of Trochinbrod (Zofiówka) within present-day Ukraine
- Coordinates: 50°55′15″N 25°41′50″E
- Country: Ukraine (location)
- Founded: 1835, Russian Empire
- Destroyed: 1942, occupied Poland (now Ukraine)
- Named for: Sofia of Württemberg

Area
  - Total: 6.99 km^{2} (2.70 sq mi)
- Website: A Lost History

Trochenbrod or Trohinbrod (Ukrainian: Трохимбрід (Trokhymbrid), Yiddish: טראָכענבראָד) was an exclusively Jewish shtetl – a small town, with an area of 1,728 acres (6.99 km^{2}) – located in the Łuck powiat of the Wołyń Voivodeship, in the Second Polish Republic and would now be located in the Volyn Oblast in Ukraine. The town used to be situated about 30 kilometres (19 mi) northeast of Lutsk.

Following the invasion of Poland by Nazi Germany and the Soviet Union in September 1939, Zofiówka (town's former Polish name) was incorporated into Soviet Ukraine and renamed Sofievka (Russian: Софиевка). Two years later, at the start of Operation Barbarossa in 1941, it became part of the Reichskommissariat Ukraine under a new Germanized name Trochenbrod. Trochenbrod was completely eradicated in the course of German occupation and the ensuing Holocaust.

The original settlement, inhabited entirely by Jews, was named after Sophie, Empress consort of Russia (1759–1828) married to the Russian Emperor Paul I. She donated a parcel of land for the Jewish settlement in the Russian Partition of the former Polish–Lithuanian Commonwealth (forming part of the new Pale of Settlement district).

== History ==
Sofievka (Trochenbrod) was founded in 1835, after the November Uprising, initially as a farming colony for the dispossessed Jews, and with time developed into a small town. The population grew from around 1,200 inhabitants (235 families) in 1889, to 1,580 in 1897 according to Jewish archives. In the Second Polish Republic, the number of inhabitants reached 4,000. The name Trochenbrod in Yiddish stands for "Dry Bread" or "Bread without Butter" (German: Trockenbrot).

Towards the end of World War I, Trochenbrod briefly became a part of the West Ukrainian People's Republic and subsequently the Ukrainian People's Republic after unification on January 22, 1919. However, during the Polish–Soviet War, the forces of the re-emerging sovereign Poland and the Red Army fought over the town. It was ceded to Poland in the Peace of Riga, and it became part of the Wołyń Voivodeship in the Kresy Borderlands. Most of the population were engaged in agriculture, dairy farming and tanning.

There were seven synagogues in Trochenbrod, including three large ones. In 1939, the town, along with the rest of Kresy, was invaded by the Soviet Union. The rabbi at that time was Rabbi Gershon Weissmann. The Communists exiled him to Siberia after accusing him of being involved in underground salt trading.

=== The Holocaust ===
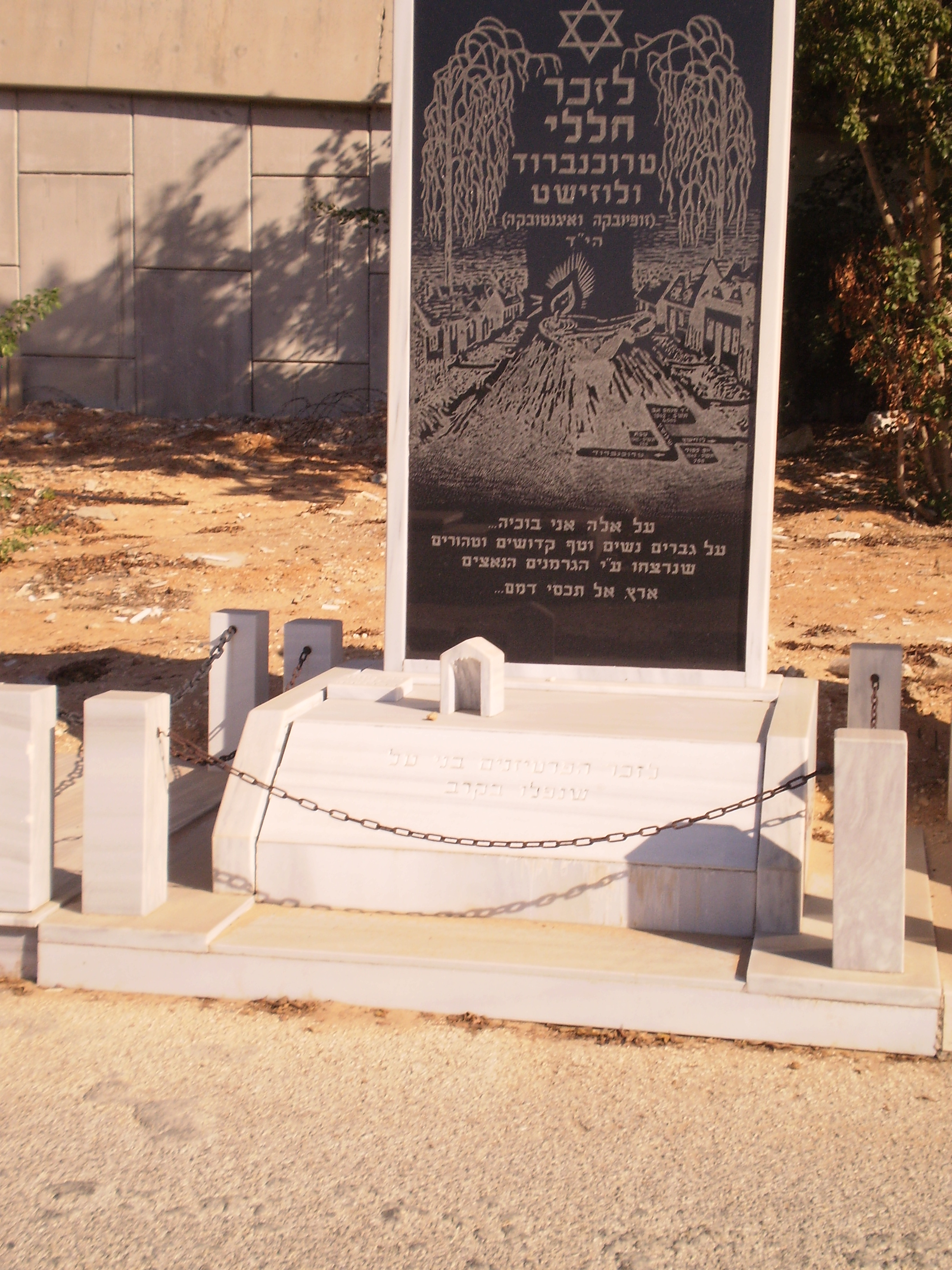
Holocaust memorial to Trochenbrod and Lozisht Jewry at the Holon Cemetery in Israel

After Nazi Germany invaded the Soviet Union in June 1941, the new German administration established a Nazi ghetto at Trochenbrod, confining there also Jews from nearby villages and towns. The ghetto was liquidated in August and September 1942 in a series of massacres by Order Police battalions with involvement of the auxiliary police. Most of the Jews of Trochenbrod as well as of the neighboring village of Lozisht were murdered by the Nazis. According to Virtual Shtetl, over 5,000 Jews were massacred, including 3,500 from Trochenbrod and 1,200 from Lozisht among other nearby settlements.

Fewer than 200 Jews managed to escape death by fleeing into the forest. Some hid in caves nearby the village. The Ukrainian Soviet partisans from the nearby village of Klubochyn assisted some 150 survivors. Some Jews joined the resistance in the region and took up partisan actions against the Nazis. The village was totally destroyed and burnt down in 1942, and subsequently leveled out after World War II in Soviet Ukraine. Now only fields and a forest can be found there, and an ominous flatland with an aimless country road running through it.

On November 4, 1942, the Nazis executed 137 inhabitants of the nearby Ukrainian settlement of Klubochyn and burnt it as a reprisal for the actions of local Soviet Ukrainian partisans fighting against the Nazis. The partisans from Klubochyn and the surrounding vicinity took up arms against the Nazis and supplied weapons to a local Jewish resistance group. Ukrainian Soviet partisans also accepted Jewish partisans into their own units and provided protection to more than 150 Jewish families that survived the ghetto at Trochenbrod and nearby Jewish settlements that were hiding in the forest. Vasily Matsuyk, an elderly survivor of a Nazi massacre and director of Klubochyn District Museum recalled the story of one Ukrainian family in Klubochyn executed for assisting Jews.

After the end of World War II, the Jewish survivors from Trochenbrod, numbering between 33 and 40, lived in the area of nearby Lutsk. The last living Holocaust survivor from Trochenbrod was Baisa-Ruchel Potash (Betty Potash Gold), who died in 2014.

== Trochenbrod in literature ==
A fictionalized historical portrayal of the shtetl life at Trachimbrod was featured in the 2002 non-fiction novel Everything Is Illuminated by Jonathan Safran Foer as well as in the 2005 film based on the novel.

Safran Foer, whose grandfather came from Trochenbrod, depicts fictionalized events in the village beginning in 1791 – the year in which the shtetl was first named – until 1942, when it was destroyed in the war. Safran Foer's modern-day protagonist (who goes by the author's name and also by the name "Hero", or "the Collector" in the film version) comes to contemporary Ukraine to look for a woman named Augustine, who saved his grandfather in the war. The novel was criticized for omitting numerous historical details and distorting history by a reviewer from Ukraine published by The Prague Post online.

Beyond Trochenbrod, a memoir of a childhood in Trochenbrod disrupted by the Holocaust, was published in 2014. The author, Betty Potash Gold, also gave oral testimonies on the events.

== See also ==
- Lozisht
