= Marching Royal Dukes =

Marching band of James Madison University

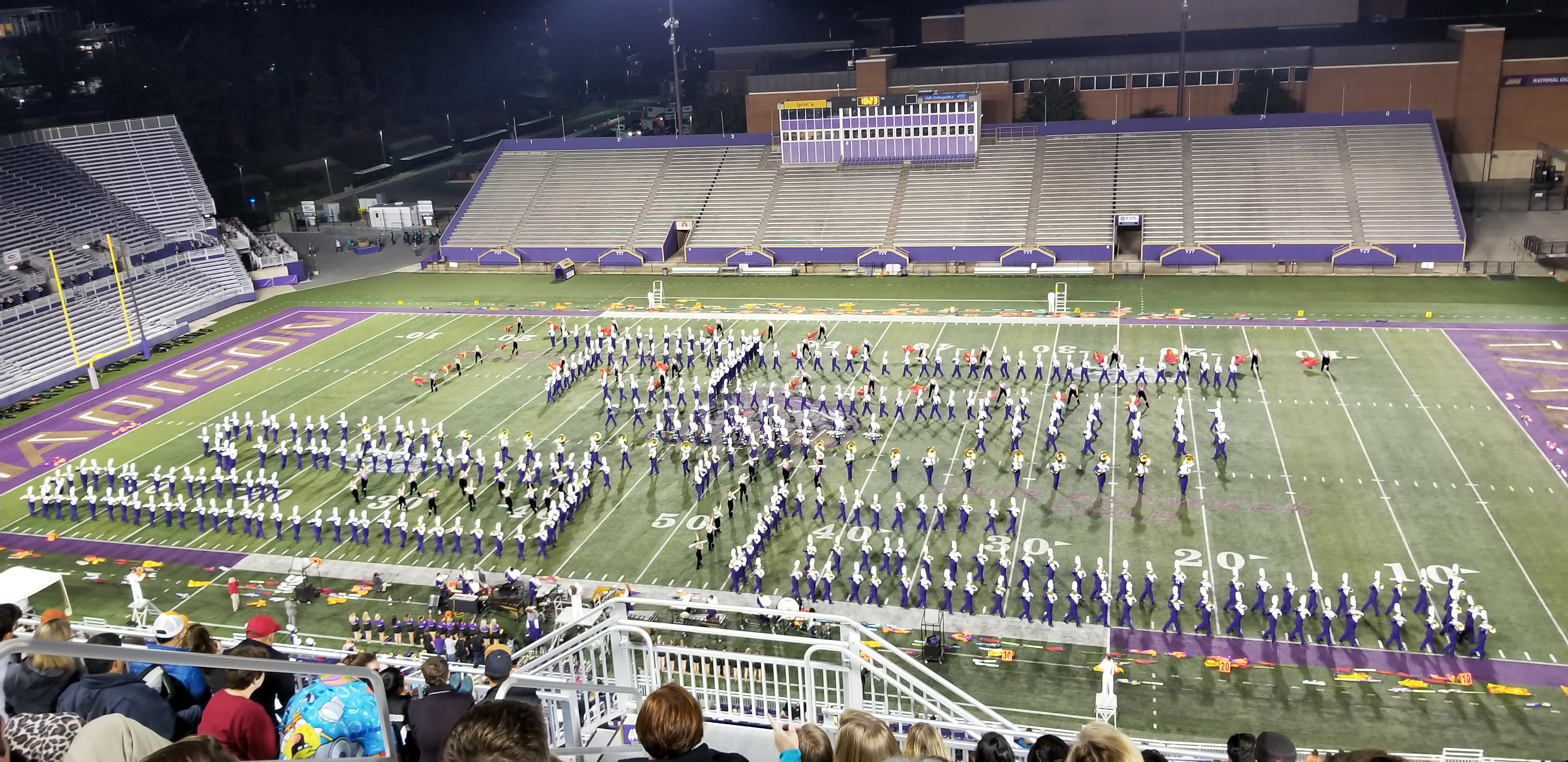
- The band performs at Bridgeforth Stadium in 2017
- Nickname: "Virginia's Finest"
- School: James Madison University
- Location: Harrisonburg, Virginia, U.S.
- Conference: Sun Belt Conference
- Founded: 1972
- Director: Scott Rikkers
- Assistant Director: Chris DeVona
- Fight song: "JMU Fight Song"
- Website: http://www.jmu.edu/mrd

The Marching Royal Dukes (MRDs), nicknamed "Virginia's Finest", is James Madison University's official marching band. Formed in 1972 alongside the football team, the band performs a pre-game, halftime and post-game show at all home football games. In 1994, the MRDs were the recipients of the Sudler Trophy, the highest honor available for a college marching band.

The MRDs have performed at venues such as the inaugurations of Presidents Bill Clinton and George W. Bush, the NFC title game between Washington and Dallas in 1983, Bands of America Grand National Championships in 1988 and 1991. The band has made four appearances in the Macy's Thanksgiving Day Parade, first in 2001, again in 2008 and 2013, and most recently in 2018. In the past decade, the band has taken trips to Europe during the school's winter break, featuring Athens, Dublin, Monaco, London, Paris, and Rome. In the most recent trip to Europe, the MRDs participated in the 2023 Italian New Year's Day Parade in the Vatican.

The Marching Royal Dukes rehearse in Bridgeforth Stadium and learn two shows every year, each show consisting of arrangements of at least three songs. Their show music consistently spans across a variety of genres, including funk, rock, musical scores and movie themes. The second piece of each show always features the Dukettes, the university's four-time National Dance Alliance champion dance team. From 1978 to 2011, the MRDs released and sold CDs featuring music from that season's show.

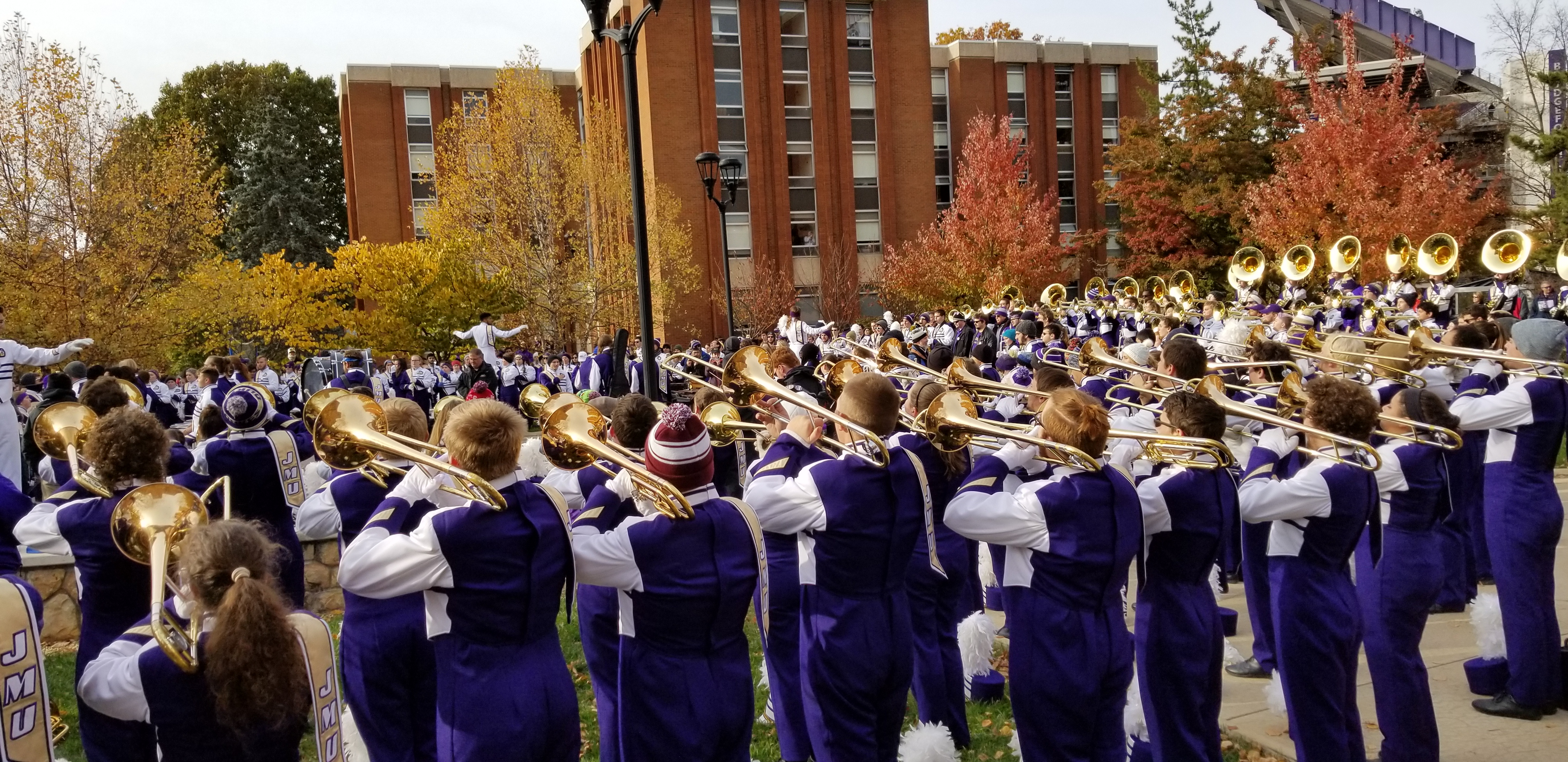
The MRDs warm up at Eagle Hall before a game.

Marching band is offered as a two-credit applied music class at JMU. As a result, the Marching Royal Dukes continuously retain one of the largest college marching band rosters in the country, sizing up at 535 members for their 2024 season. The MRDs are open to all majors and to students from local community colleges.

Every summer, the MRDs host an annual band camp, the JMU Summer Band Camps, which welcomes students from across the Mid-Atlantic to attend and train with staff. There are five different camps offered, each focusing on a different section of the band, including Drum Major and Colorguard. During fall, the Marching Royal Dukes perform in exhibition at various Virginia high school band competitions. In October, the MRDs host Parade of Champions, a large high school marching band competition in which attracts over 50 bands from across Virginia and other nearby states come to perform and be adjudicated.

== Pep Band ==
During the basketball season, the JMU Pep Band, performs at all home games. If either team plays in a postseason tournament, the band travels with them as well. The Pep Band is open to all members of the marching band, and has twice been named "Best Pep Band in the East" by Eastern Basketball Magazine. In recent seasons the Pep Band debuted an arrangement of "Start Wearing Purple", a song by the gypsy punk band Gogol Bordello, at basketball games and both the 2013 CAA and NCAA Tournaments. The song has since taken off around campus to the extent that it is now a staple song for the athletic promotional material, and starting in the 2013 Football Season, the Marching Royal Dukes presented it as a part of their pre-game show.
