= Multi Kontra Culti vs. Irony =

Studio album by Gogol Bordello
- Released: 17 September 2002
- Recorded: August 2001 – January 2002; Integrated Studios, NYC
- Genre: Folk punk, punk rock, gypsy punk
- Length: 51:59
- Label: Rubric Records
- Producer: Gogol Bordello

Gogol Bordello chronology
Voi-La Intruder (1999)	Multi Kontra Culti vs. Irony (2002)	Gogol Bordello vs. Tamir Muskat (2004)

Professional ratings
Review scores
Source	Rating
AllMusic	4/5 stars
Robert Christgau	(A−)
Pitchfork Media	(5.2/10)

Multi Kontra Culti vs. Irony is the second album by Gogol Bordello. It was released on 17 September 2002 by Rubric Records.

"Occurrence on the Border (Hopping on a Pogo-Gypsy Stick)" and "Through the Roof 'n' Underground" were featured on the soundtrack to the 2006 film Wristcutters: A Love Story, in which Shea Whigham's character of Eugene is based on Gogol Bordello frontman Eugene Hütz.

== Track listing ==
No.	Title	Length
1.	"When the Trickster Starts A-Poking (Bordello Kind of Guy)"	5:06
2.	"Occurrence on the Border (Hopping on a Pogo-Gypsy Stick)"	3:26
3.	"Haltura"	5:01
4.	"Let's Get Radical"	3:59
5.	"Smarkatch"	3:14
6.	"Future Kings"	4:40
7.	"Punk Rock Parranda"	3:56
8.	"Through the Roof 'n' Underground"	5:29
9.	"Baro Foro"	9:02
10.	"Hats Off to Kolpakoff"	2:21
11.	"Huliganjetta"	5:39
