= Seekers and Finders =

Studio album by Gogol Bordello
- Released: 25 August 2017
- Studios: Hey Guy Studio, New York, NY; Inner Ear Studios, Washington, DC; Oscilloscope, New York, NY; Racine Studio, Montgomery, VT
- Genres: Folk punk, folk, gypsy punk
- Length: 37:47
- Label: Cooking Vinyl
- Producer: Eugene Hütz

Gogol Bordello chronology
Pura Vida Conspiracy (2013)	Seekers and Finders (2017)	Solidaritine (2022)

Professional ratings
Aggregate scores
Source	Rating
Metacritic	73/100
Review scores
Source	Rating
AllMusic	4/5 stars
Exclaim!	8/10
The Independent	2/5 stars
PopMatters	8/10

Seekers and Finders is the seventh studio album by folk punk band Gogol Bordello. It was released in August 2017 under Cooking Vinyl and is their first studio album since 2013's Pura Vida Conspiracy. This is the first Gogol Bordello album produced solely by frontman Eugene Hütz.

The album's lead single, "Saboteur Blues", was released in June 2017. The album's title track, "Seekers and Finders", features guest singer Regina Spektor.

== Track list ==
No.	Title	Length
1.	"Did It All"	3:26
2.	"Walking on the Burning Coal"	3:01
3.	"Break into Your Higher Self"	3:36
4.	"Seekers and Finders"	3:04
5.	"Familia Bonfireball"	5:14
6.	"Clearvoyance"	3:14
7.	"Saboteur Blues"	3:09
8.	"Love Gangsters"	4:07
9.	"If I Ever Get Home Before Dark"	3:24
10.	"You Know Who We Are (Uprooted Funk)"	2:17
11.	"Still That Way"	3:15
