= Solidaritine =

Studio album by Gogol Bordello
- Released: September 16, 2022
- Studios: Atlantic Sound Studios, Brooklyn, New York City, New York, United States; Inner Ear Studios, Washington, D. C., United States; Oscilloscope Studio, New York City, New York, United States; Passafarm Studios, Princess Anne, Maryland, United States; Tank Studios, Burlington, Vermont, United States
- Genres: Folk punk, Gypsy punk
- Length: 47:02
- Language: English
- Label: Cooking Vinyl
- Producers: Eugene Hütz; Walter Schreifels

Gogol Bordello chronology
Seekers and Finders (2017)	Solidaritine (2022)

Solidaritine is a 2022 studio album by American Gypsy punk band Gogol Bordello. It has received positive reviews from critics. The album has a theme of supporting the Ukrainian people in the Russian invasion of Ukraine and was supported by a tour that included performing for Ukrainian soldiers.

== Reception ==
Editors at AllMusic Guide rated this album 4.5 out of five stars, calling it among the best of 2022, with critic Thom Jurek writing that the music has diversity with, "many different folk styles here, all are given utterance through punk and post-punk" and summing up "its canny songwriting and sophisticated musicianship combined with [Walter] Schreifels' raw production make this album one of the band's finest to date". Writing for The Arts Desk, Guy Oddy rated this album three out of five stars, praising the band for not "resorting to sloganeering" while using their music for political advocacy, but lamenting that "it’s yet another album that really doesn’t do justice to a band whose explosive shows are nothing less than spectacular". In Louder Than War, Steve John proposed that Solidaritine "may be one of the most urgent and personal albums of this or any other year it isn’t just a soundtrack to a war". Bob Fish of Spectrum Culture rates this release four out of five stars, calling it "an album that stands up to the forces of hate and bigotry".

== Track listing ==
All songs have music written by Gogol Bordello, with lyrics by Eugene Hütz, except where noted

1. "Shot of Solidaritine" – 4:11
2. "Focus Coin" – 4:32
3. "Blueprint" (Brendan Canty, Joe Lally, Ian MacKaye, and Guy Picciotto, a Fugazi cover) – 3:02
4. "The Era of the End of Eras" – 4:23
5. "I’m Coming Out" – 3:36
6. "Knack for Life" – 3:05
7. "The Great Hunt of Idiot Savant" – 3:27
8. "Take Only What You Can Carry" (lyrics by Hütz and Serhiy Zhadan) – 2:42
9. "My Imaginary Son" – 3:33
10. "Forces of Victory" (lyrics by Hütz and Zhadan) – 3:58
11. "Fire on Ice Floe" – 4:51
12. "Gut Guidance" – 3:31
13. "Huckleberry Generation" – 2:11

== Personnel ==
Gogol Bordello

- Gill Alexandre – bass guitar
- Eugene Hütz – acoustic and electric guitar, vocals, accordion on "The Great Hunt of Idiot Savant", production
- Korey "Kingston" Horn – drums
- Boris Pelekh – acoustic and electric guitar, vocals
- Sergey Ryabtsev – violin, vocals
- Pedro Erazo Segovia – percussion, vocals
- Ashley Tobias – vocals

Additional personnel

- Ted Bowne – additional engineering on "The Era of the End of Eras"
- Oliver Charles – drums on "Blueprint" and "Gut Guidance"
- Alan Douches – mastering at West West Side Music
- Tom Gardner – mixing
- Thomas Gobena – bass guitar
- H.R. – vocals on "The Era of the End of Eras"
- Kazka – vocals on "Take Only What You Can Carry" and "Forces of Victory"
- Andre Kelman – engineering on "Take Only What You Can Carry"
- Yuri Lemeshev – accordion on "Gut Guidance"
- Mitzy Montoya – layout
- Yevhenii Nedilko – artwork, design
- Alejandro Neira – photography
- Pasha Newmer – accordion
- Rob O'Dea – engineering on all tracks except "Blueprint" and "Take Only What You Can Carry"
- Fredo Ortiz – drums on "Take Only What You Can Carry"
- Alex Ryaboy – accordion, additional engineer, pre-production
- Walter Schreifels – guitar on "Blueprint" and "Gut Guidance", production
- Diko Shoturma – engineering on "Take Only What You Can Carry", mixing on "Take Only What You Can Carry"
- Sanjay Suchak – photography
- Elizabeth Sun – vocals on "Gut Guidance"
- Michael Ward – guitar on "Blueprint" and "Gut Guidance"
- Oleksandra Zaritska – vocals on "Take Only What You Can Carry" and "Forces of Victory"
- Serhiy Zhadan – vocals on "Forces of Victory"
- Don Zientara – engineering on "Blueprint" and "Gut Guidance"

== See also ==
- Lists of 2022 albums
