= Lozisht =

Former shtetl in Wołyń Voivodeship (modern-day Ukraine)

Ignatówka (Lozisht)
- Shtetl (completely destroyed)
- Lozisht location east of Belzec in World War II

- Location of destroyed town of Ignatówka (Lozisht) within present-day Ukraine
- Coordinates: 50°55′15″N 25°41′50″E
- Country: Russian Empire, then in Second Polish Republic
- Founded: 1838, Russian Empire
- Destroyed: 1942, during the Holocaust by bullets
- Website: heavensareempty.com/website/Synopsis.html

Ignatówka, also Lozisht, was a Jewish shtetl (village) located in what is now western Ukraine but which used to be part of the Second Polish Republic before the Nazi-Soviet invasion of Poland in 1939. Ignatówka was bordering a Jewish shtetl in Zofjówka, located in the gmina Silno, powiat Łuck of the Wołyń Voivodeship, in prewar Poland. The two villages were part of a joint Jewish community of Trochenbrod and Lozisht.

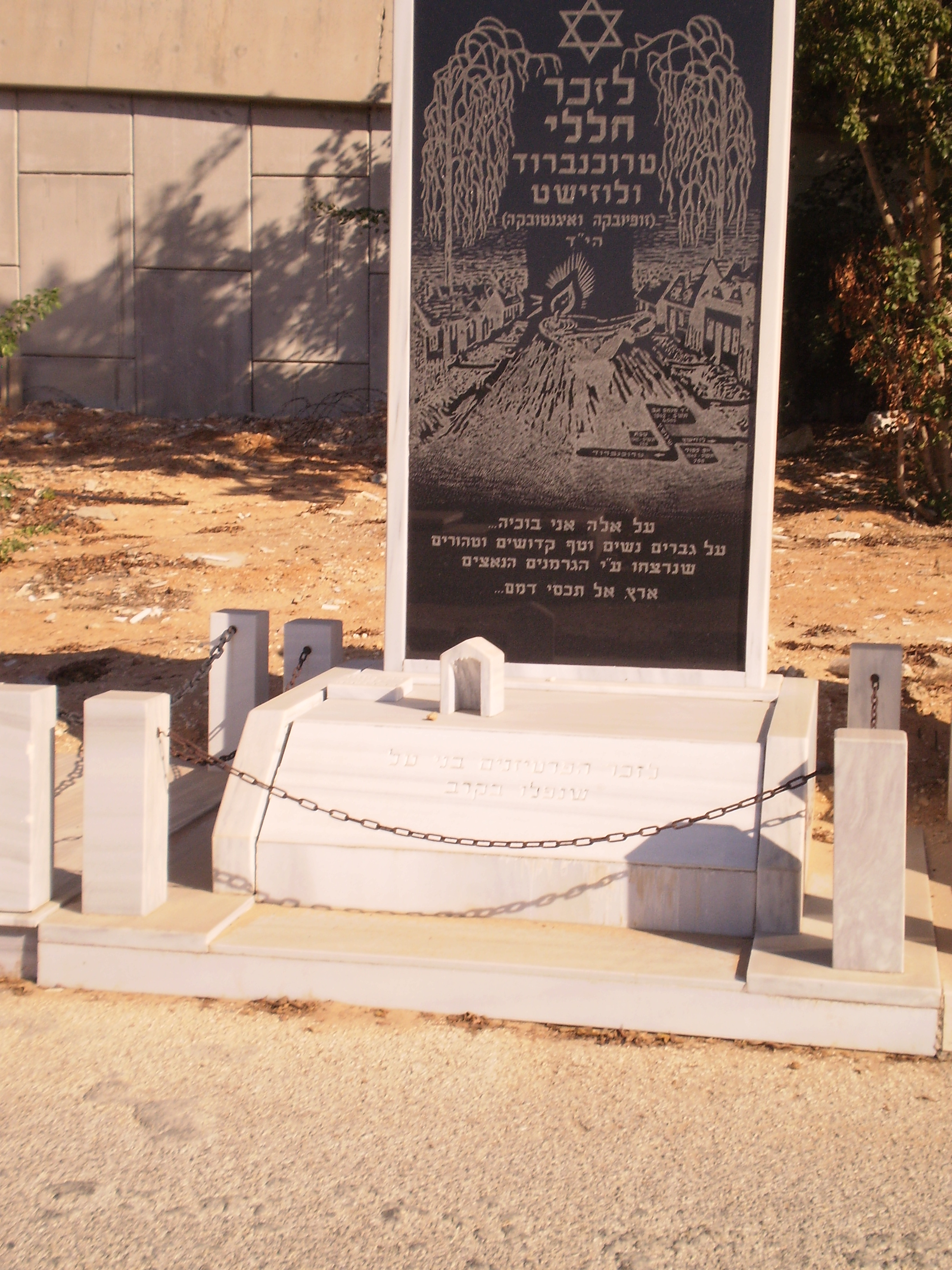
Lozisht and Trochenbrod Jewery Holocaust memorial (Holon Cemetery, Israel)

Ignatówka (Lozisht) was founded in 1838, and had grown to approximately 1,200 inhabitants by the beginning of World War II. Of those, only a few survived. Most of the Jews of Ignatówka died in a single killing spree along with the Jews of neighbouring Zofjówka (Trochenbrod) in the hands of local collaborators, consisting mostly of the Ukrainian Auxiliary Police shooters who rounded up the prisoners in the presence of only a few German SS men. According to Virtual Shtetl over 5,000 Jews were massacred, including 3,500 from Zofiówka and 1,200 from Ignatówka, including some inhabitants of other nearby settlements. The village was destroyed and now only fields and a forest can be seen there.
