= Fire bucket =

Bucket filled with water or sand that is used to extinguish fires

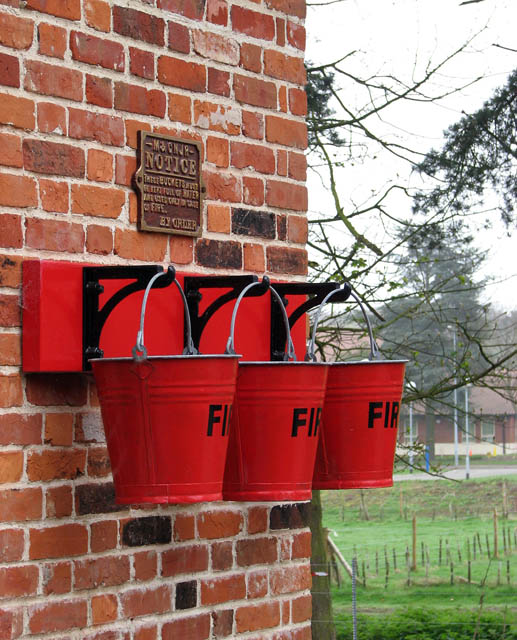
Fire buckets hung on the wall of a railway station in Holt, England

A fire bucket is a bucket filled with water or sand which is used to prevent or extinguish fires.

Typically, fire buckets are painted bright red and have the word fire stencilled on them. Often they have a convex, protruding bottom. The rounded bottom results in a strong, directed stream of water when the water is thrown at the fire. The rounded-bottom bucket is far more efficient in launching the water at the fire than a flat bottom bucket.

Fire buckets are a low-technology method of fighting small fires. Although largely superseded by more modern forms of firefighting equipment, they retain some distinct advantages and remain the preferred method for fighting small fires in certain situations. The main advantages of fire buckets are that they are cheap, reliable, easy to use and can be quickly refilled and reinstated.

Normally, they are hung on dedicated fire bucket stands and placed in prominent positions in rooms or corridors, next to ovens or barbecues, and in government accommodation such as army barrack blocks. They are also commonly found in hyperbaric chambers.

Oil fires are resistant to water, but small fires can be effectively extinguished when the sand in the bucket is dumped on the fire to starve it of the oxygen it needs to stay alight. This method of fighting liquid fires has generally been replaced by modern foaming agents.

The sand from a fire bucket can also be used to absorb spills of flammable liquids and render them less dangerous, by reducing the risk of ignition and explosion. Fire buckets are often provided at petrol filling stations to absorb any small fuel spills.

== Gallery ==
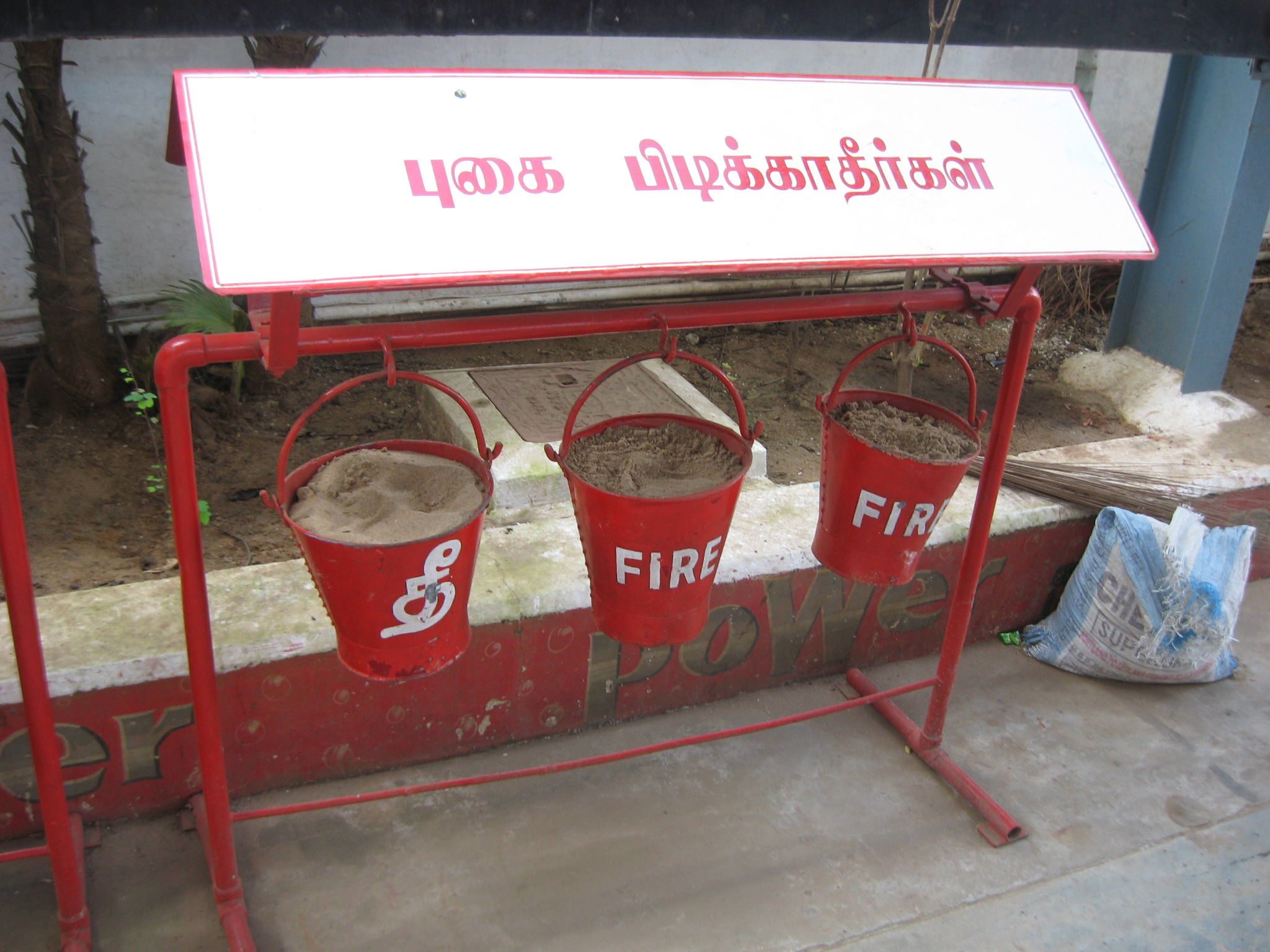
Buckets of sand at a gas station in India

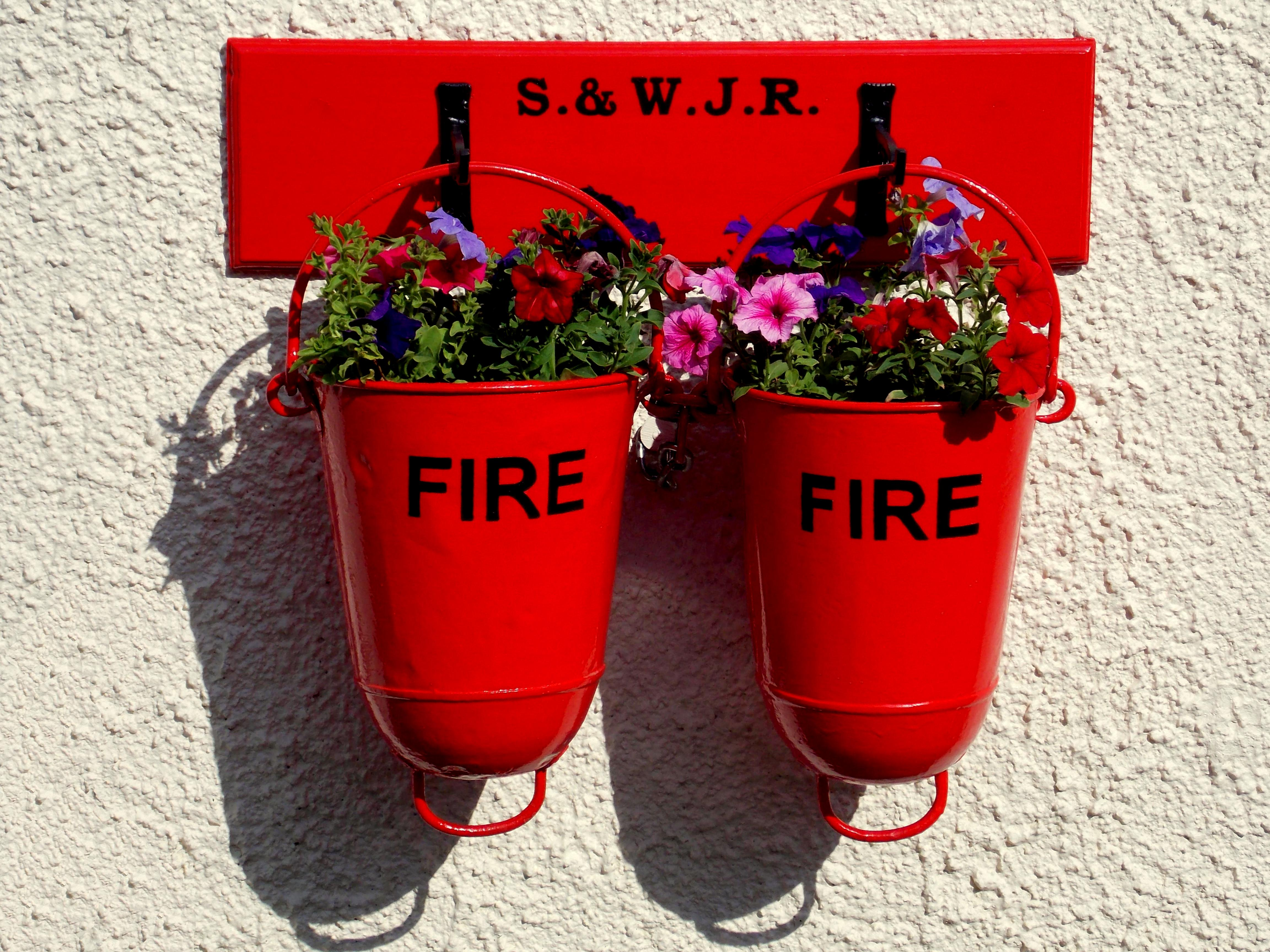
Round-bottomed fire buckets in Parkend, Gloucestershire. S.& W. J. R. stands for the Severn & Wye Joint Railway, repurposed as flowerpots

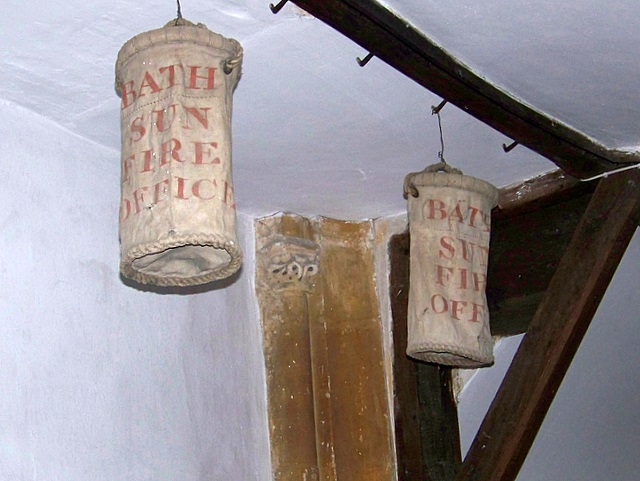
Canvas fire buckets, in Puddletown, Dorset, provided by the insurers, Sun Insurance, in 1805

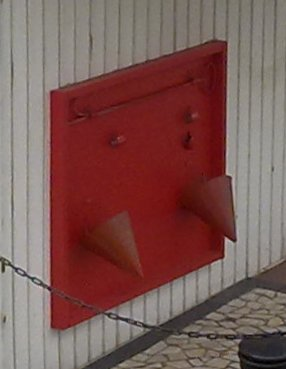
Conical fire buckets in Moscow

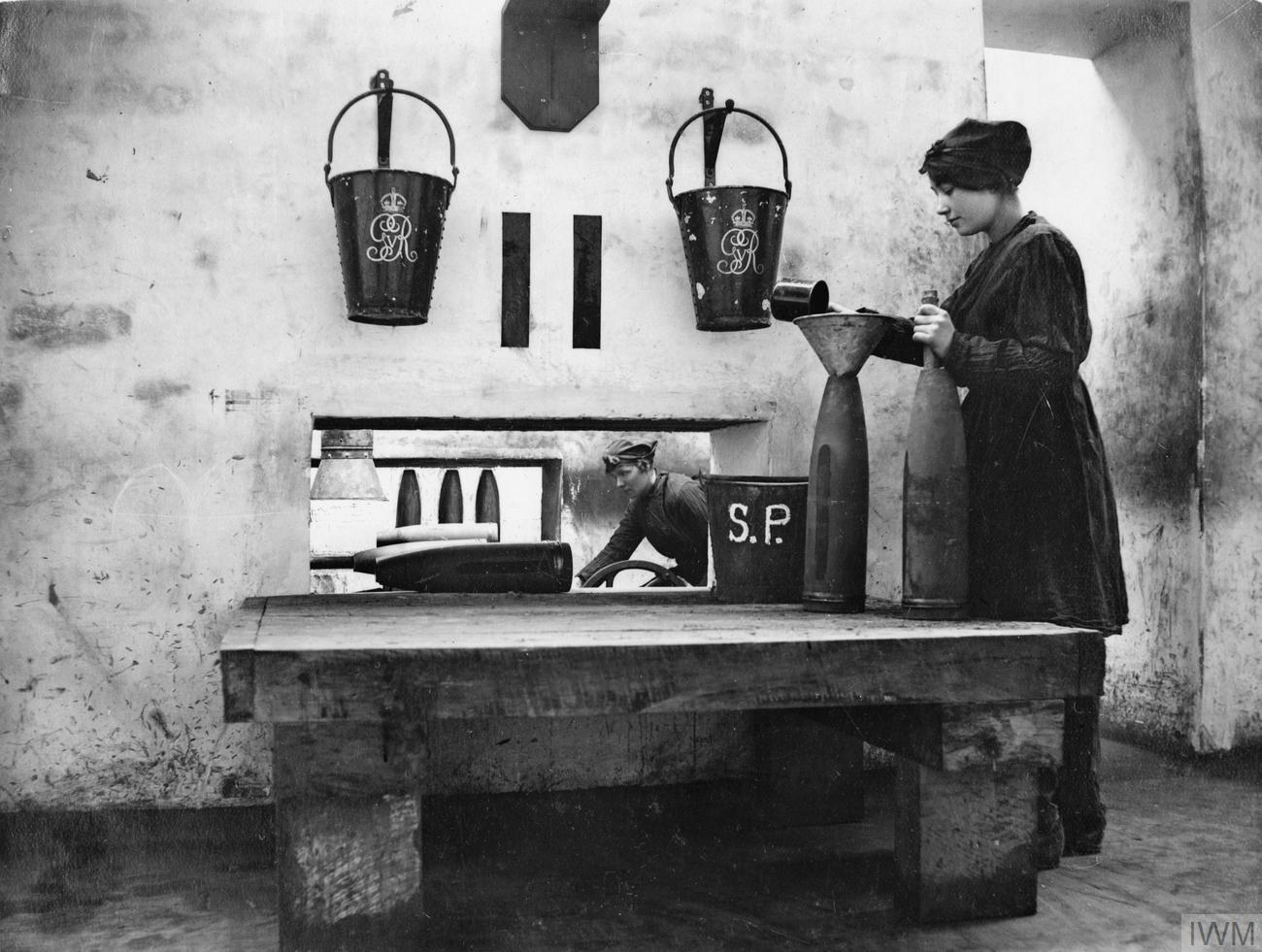
Fire buckets at a British munitions plant during World War I, marked with the royal cypher of George V
