= Everything Is Illuminated (film) =

- Everything Is Illuminated movie poster
- Directed by: Liev Schreiber
- Screenplay by: Liev Schreiber
- Based on: Everything Is Illuminated by Jonathan Safran Foer
- Produced by: Marc Turtletaub; Peter Saraf; Matthew Stillman
- Starring: Elijah Wood; Eugene Hütz; Boris Leskin; Laryssa Lauret
- Cinematography: Matthew Libatique
- Edited by: Andrew Marcus; Craig McKay
- Music by: Paul Cantelon; Sergei Shnurov
- Production companies: Deep River Productions; Big Beach; Stillking Films; Cinetic Media
- Distributed by: Warner Independent Pictures
- Release date: September 16, 2005
- Running time: 104 minutes
- Country: United States
- Languages: English; Russian; Ukrainian
- Budget: $7 million
- Box office: $3.6 million

Everything Is Illuminated is a 2005 American biographical comedy-drama film, written and directed by Liev Schreiber and starring Elijah Wood and Eugene Hütz. It was adapted from the novel of the same name by Jonathan Safran Foer, and was the debut film of Liev Schreiber both as a director and as a screenwriter.

== Plot ==
Jonathan Safran Foer, a young American Jew, goes on a quest to Ukraine to find Augustine, the woman who saved his grandfather, Safran Foer, during the Holocaust. He searches for a small town called Trachimbrod that was wiped off the map when the Nazis liquidated Eastern European shtetls.

Jonathan arranges to hire Odesa-based Heritage Tours. This company has specialized in escorting wealthy Americans in search of their roots for decades, despite generally thinking Jewish people are stupid for wanting to revisit their past and not being very knowledgeable about the subject of finding Jews. Thus, the company usually simply attempts to scam them by taking them on long journeys. His guides, who drive up from Odesa to meet Jonathan as he arrives at the train station in Lviv, are a cranky, seemingly antisemitic grandfather, Alexander Perchov; his wound-up dog, Sammy Davis Jr. Jr.; and his enthusiastic grandson, Alexander III ("Alex"). Alex constantly chatters with a unique command of English and a passion for American pop culture that keeps the arduous journey lighter. Despite the tour guides' general uncaring attitude, after hearing Jonathan's compelling story, they decide they actually want to help him.

Along the way in Volhynia, as they travel in search of the shtetl in the region around Lutsk, they have a series of misadventures, many of them humorous and based on the culture shock Jonathan experiences as an American tourist in Ukraine.

Traveling through much of rural western Ukraine, the three men eventually find Augustine's sister, Lista. She lives by herself in a house in the midst of a great sunflower field, isolated from technology and from news of the outside world. Lista tells them that Augustine, the pregnant first wife of Jonathan's grandfather, was killed by Nazi soldiers after her father refused to spit on the Torah. She leads them to the site where the town had been. Jonathan's grandfather had left for the United States the week before the massacre.

The next night Alex's grandfather quietly kills himself. Through flashbacks, it was revealed he was Jewish. During the massacre of the Jews of his town in the Holocaust, he was shot and thrown into a mass grave. Hours later, he regained consciousness and crawled out of the pit alive, and managed to survive the war himself by hiding his identity as a Jew. He abandoned this identity permanently, symbolically walking away from it.

Jonathan returns home to the United States after saying farewell to Alex, to whom he has grown close. They strike up a correspondence.

Both Jonathan and Alex sprinkle soil gathered from the site of the massacre on their respective grandfathers' graves. Alex's grandfather is given a Jewish tombstone.

== Cast ==
- Elijah Wood as Jonathan Safran Foer
- Boris Leskin as Grandfather
- Eugene Hütz as Alex
- Laryssa Lauret as Lista
- Jonathan Safran Foer as Leaf Blower

== Music ==
The score for Everything Is Illuminated features eight original tracks composed by Paul Cantelon, along with songs by Russian ska punk band Leningrad, Arkady Severny, Csókolom, Tin Hat Trio, and Gogol Bordello, whose lead singer Eugene Hütz plays Alex. The band members of Gogol Bordello play the band in the train station where the character Alex has come to meet his US client, Jonathan Foer. DeVotchKa's single "How It Ends" is featured in the trailer, but not in the official soundtrack.

== Critical response ==
American Chronicle counted the film among the "rare films that encapsulate the emotion of discovery and drama with humor", while Time Out New York called it Liev Schreiber's "unbelievably assured debut as a director". Roger Ebert praised the film, assigning it 3 and a half stars out of 4, and suggested that one might well see it a second time, as he did, "to understand the journey it takes".

== Awards ==
- 2005: Lanterna Magica Prize and Biografilm Award: Venice Film Festival: Liev Schreiber
- 2005: Best Screenplay: São Paulo International Film Festival: Liev Schreiber
- 2006: Best Actor: Pacific Meridian: Boris Leskin

== See also ==
- The Holocaust in Ukraine
- Eugene Hütz of Gogol Bordello
