= Gypsy Punks: Underdog World Strike =

Studio album by Gogol Bordello
- Released: August 9, 2005
- Recorded: October, 2004–February, 2005
- Genres: Folk punk, worldbeat, gypsy punk, reggae
- Length: 63:34
- Label: SideOneDummy
- Producers: Steve Albini, Gogol Bordello

Gogol Bordello chronology
East Infection (2004)	Gypsy Punks: Underdog World Strike (2005)	Super Taranta! (2007)

Gypsy Punks: Underdog World Strike is the third album by Gogol Bordello, released in 2005 by SideOneDummy Records. Production was done by Steve Albini alongside Gogol Bordello.

Other songs from the same era and recording sessions appear on the EP East Infection.

Professional ratings
Review scores
Source	Rating
AllMusic	4.5/5 stars
Kludge	7/10
Pitchfork Media	7.8/10
Robert Christgau	A

== Track listing ==
All lyrics are written by Eugene Hütz; all music is composed by Hütz and Gogol Bordello.

No.	Title	Length
1.	"Sally"	3:03
2.	"I Would Never Wanna Be Young Again"	3:46
3.	"Not a Crime"	4:31
4.	"Immigrant Punk"	3:45
5.	"60 Revolutions"	2:58
6.	"Avenue B"	3:08
7.	"Dogs Were Barking"	4:53
8.	"Oh No"	2:59
9.	"Start Wearing Purple"	3:43
10.	"Think Locally, Fuck Globally"	4:23
11.	"Underdog World Strike"	5:24
12.	"Illumination"	3:52
13.	"Santa Marinella"	5:28
14.	"Undestructable"	4:53
15.	"Mishto!"	6:51
Total length:		1:03:37

== Personnel ==
Gogol Bordello

- Eugene Hütz – vocals, guitar, fire buckets, body percussion
- Sergey Ryabtsev – violin, vocals
- Yuri Lemeshev – accordion, vocals
- Oren Kaplan – guitar, vocals
- Rea Mochiach – bass, percussion, electronics, programming, vocals
- Eliot Ferguson – drums, vocals
- Pamela Jintana Racine – percussion, vocals
- Elizabeth Sun – percussion, vocals

Guests

- Pedro Erazo – vocals
- Ras Kush – MC
