= Eugene Hütz =

Ukrainian-American musician, disc jockey, and actor

Eugene Hütz Євген Гудзь
- Hütz at HISTORY in 2026

Background information
- Born: Yevhen Oleksandrovych Nikolaiev-Symonov; September 6, 1972 (age 54); Boyarka, Ukrainian SSR, Soviet Union
- Genre: Gypsy punk
- Instruments: Guitar, vocals, fire bucket
- Years active: 1999–present

Eugene Hütz (Note: Ukrainian: Євген Гудзь, romanized: Yevhen Hudz, IPA: [jeu̯ˈɦɛn ˈɦudzʲ]) (German: [hʏts]; born Yevhen Oleksandrovych Nikolaiev-Symonov, (Note: Ukrainian: Євген Олександрович Ніколаєв-Симонов) September 6, 1972) is a Ukrainian-American singer, composer, disc jockey and actor, most notable as the frontman of the Gypsy punk band Gogol Bordello.

== Early life ==
Hütz was born in Boyarka, to a Ukrainian-Lithuanian father, a butcher by profession, and a Ukrainian mother who was of half Servitka Roma ancestry. His father also played guitar in one of Ukraine's first rock bands, Meridian. When Eugene was 14, he and his father made his first guitar of plywood, his first distortion pedals out of radio parts, and his first drum set from large metal fish cans, skinned with layers of Scotch tape. Hütz learned English through his musical "mentors" because, as he put it, "Russian rock always had lyrics that were superb and more advanced than the original Western rock 'n' roll, I think. Of course, Western rock is much stronger when it comes to performance and production, but Russian songwriters were the champions of writing lyrics. So naturally, I picked mentors who taught me how to tell a story, like Johnny Cash or Nick Cave or Leonard Cohen or Shane MacGowan from The Pogues. I learned English through my mentors. I feel like they are kind of my uncles in this sense."

Hütz's transition into an American singer was a long journey through Poland, Hungary, Austria and Italy. Descendants of the Romani called the Servo Roma (a tribe known for its blacksmiths, horsetraders and musicians), Hütz and his family fled their hometown after hearing of the Chernobyl meltdown. They spent seven years trekking through Eastern European refugee camps before settling in the US. While living in Kyiv, Hütz's parents hid their Roma ancestry, and it was during this journey that Hütz was introduced to his roots. They visited the village his family came from, and his relatives introduced him to the essential foods and music of their culture.

Hütz's Roma/Ukrainian background provides his central inspiration, influencing his lifestyle and the music of his band Gogol Bordello. Hütz's connection with his cultural roots is not without controversy, however, and he is seen as a polarizing figure among international Romani rights activists due to stereotypical displays of Romani culture.

Hütz arrived in Vermont in 1992 as a political refugee through a resettlement program with his mother, father and cousin Yosef.

== Gogol Bordello ==
Hütz started his musical career in Ukraine with the band Uksusnik (Vinegar Tap). While in Vermont, Hütz formed the punk band The Fags. He later moved to New York and took on his mother's German maiden name of Hütz. In New York, he met the future members of Gogol Bordello, including violinist Sergey Ryabtsev, accordionist Yuri Lemeshev, guitarist Oren Kaplan, drummer Eliot Ferguson and dancers Pam Racine and Elizabeth Sun. He first called the band "Hutz and the Bela Bartoks", but changed it after realizing that "nobody knows who the hell Béla Bartók is in the United States."

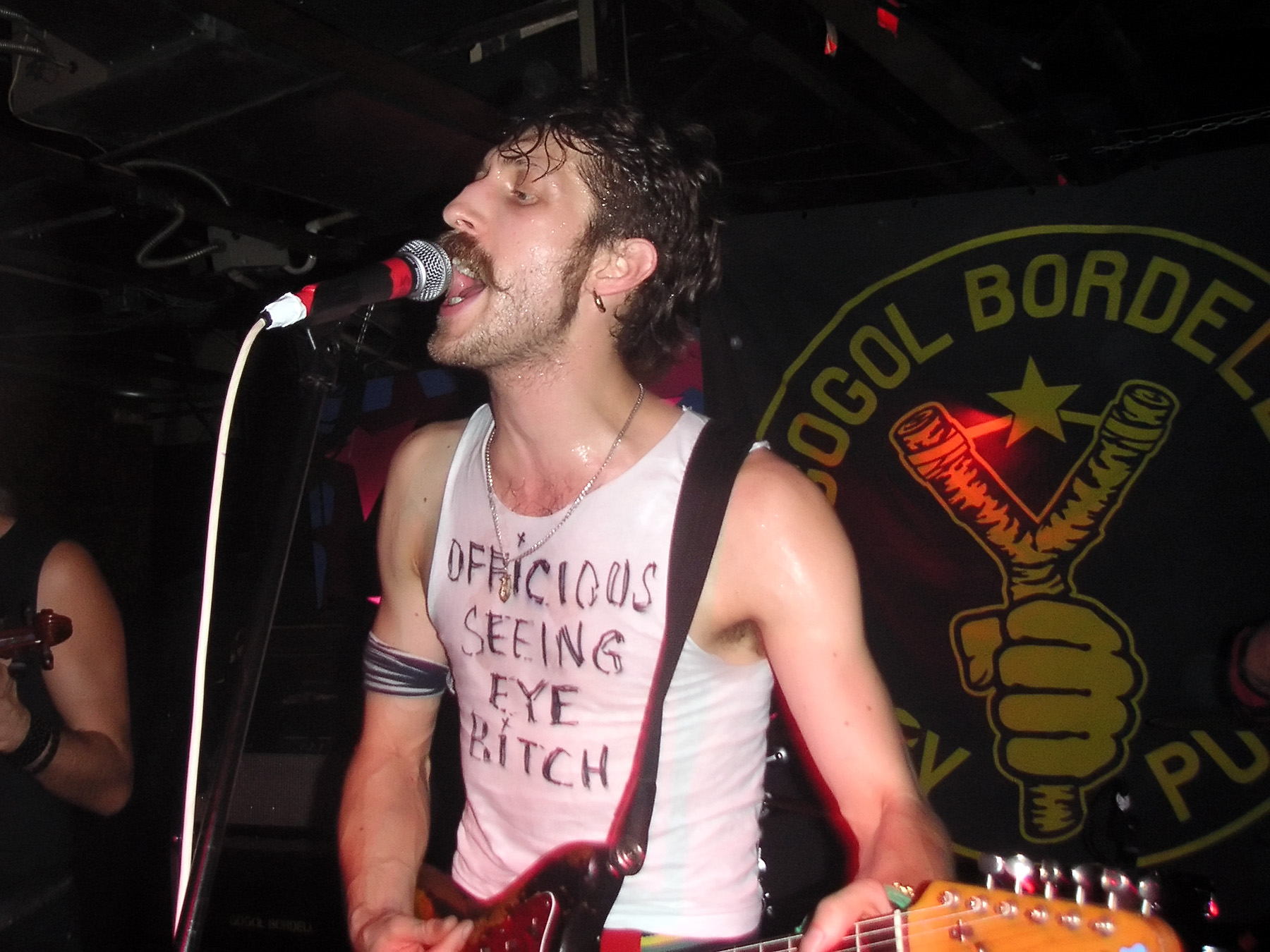
Hütz performing with Gogol Bordello in 2005

In 1999, Gogol Bordello released their debut full-length Voi-La Intruder, produced by Nick Cave & the Bad Seeds drummer Jim Sclavunos. In September 2002 the band released their second album Multi Kontra Culti vs. Irony. In 2005 the band released the E.P. East Infection followed later that year by the SideOneDummy debut Gypsy Punks: Underdog World Strike, recorded by Steve Albini. Gogol Bordello's next offering, Super Taranta! (produced by Victor Van Vugt) became one of their most critically acclaimed releases with music critic Robert Christgau calling Gogol Bordello "the world's most visionary band." Their next album, Trans-Continental Hustle, was released on April 27, 2010, and the LP on May 11, 2010. The band's sixth studio album, Pura Vida Conspiracy, was released in 2013, followed by their seventh, Seekers and Finders, in 2017, followed by their eighth, Solidaritine in 2022, and most recently, their ninth, We Mean It, Man! in 2026.

Gogol Bordello's live shows and Hütz's stage presence have earned them invitations to places such as The Whitney Museum in New York, The Tate Modern in London and the Venice Biennale in Italy. Gogol Bordello has played events such as Riot Fest, Coachella Valley Music and Arts Festival, Bonnaroo, Lollapalooza, Glastonbury, Roskilde Festival, Reading, Virgin Mobile Fest, Leeds, Bumbershoot, Austin City Limits Music Festival, Byron Bay Bluesfest and A Campingflight to Lowlands Paradise.

== Other projects ==
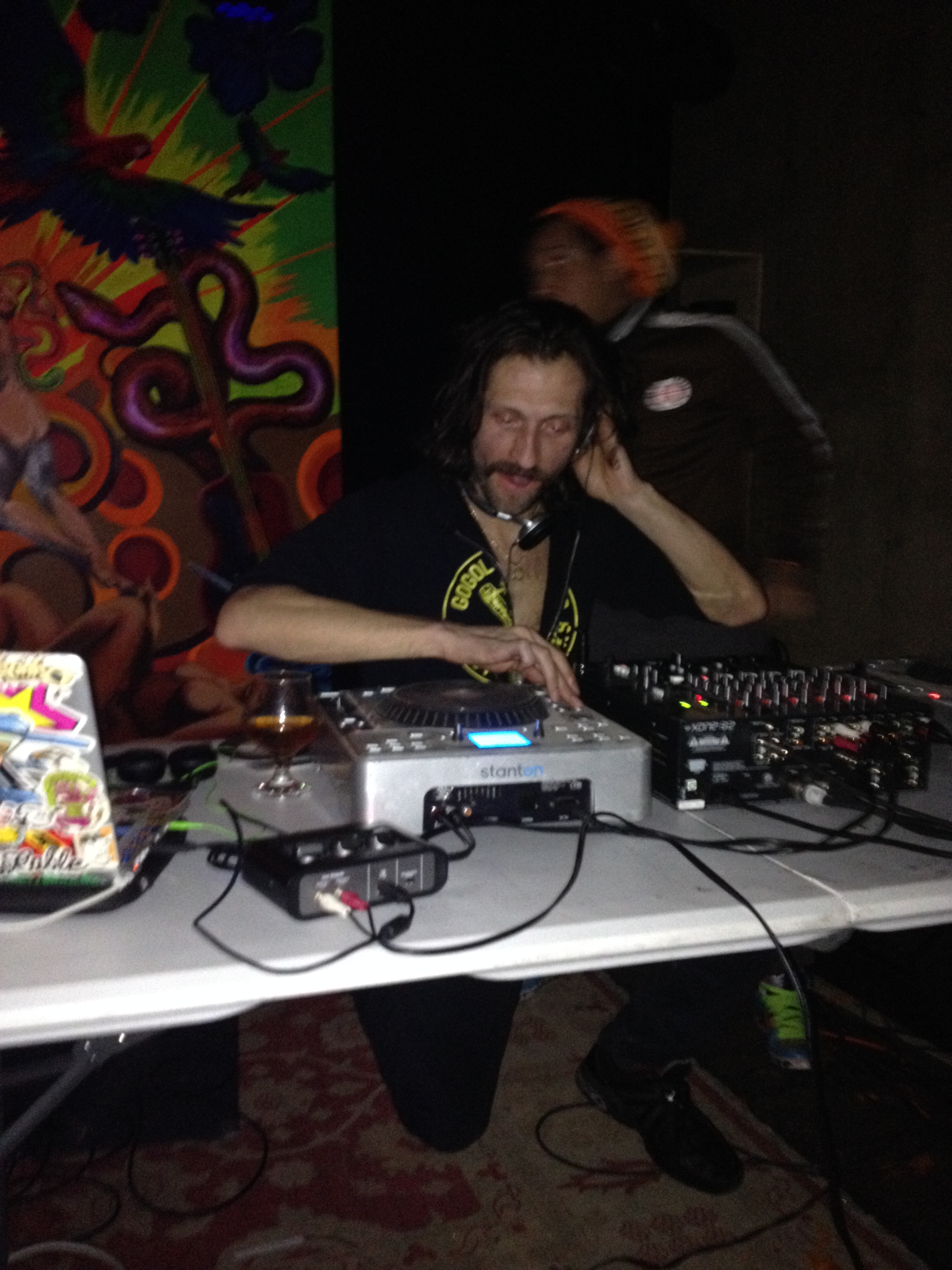
Eugene Hütz DJing at Tropicalia in Washington, DC on December 28, 2013

In New York Hütz made a name for himself as a DJ with a style best represented on his experimental side project J.U.F. (Jüdisch-Ukrainische Freundschaft) and a newer incarnation, MITITIKA. He has also performed and recorded with the Kolpakov Trio. In the early-2000s, he was a regular DJ at Mehanata,an East European-influenced nightspot in Manhattan better known as Bulgarian Bar. Gogol Bordello played some of its earliest shows there, and the bar was the hub of the city's nascent gypsy punk scene. "I was a Ukrainian D.J. spinning Gypsy records in a bar in Chinatown,” Hütz said. “It doesn’t get more New York City than that.”

Hütz made his film debut in the 2005 film Everything Is Illuminated, playing the character Alex. In addition to his film role, Hütz wrote and performed (as part of Gogol Bordello) some of the music for the film's soundtrack. Several Gogol Bordello members made cameo appearances in various roles in the movie.

Hütz is the subject of the 2006 documentary, The Pied Piper of Hützovina. Directed by Pavla Fleischer, the film chronicles Hütz's annual trip across Ukraine and Eastern Europe exploring his musical and cultural roots.

Hütz played the lead character in Filth and Wisdom, a 2008 film that marked Madonna’s directorial debut. The film premiered at the Berlin International Film Festival on February 13, 2008.

Hütz wrote the introduction for the Subculture Books edition of Taras Bulba, released in December 2008.

Hütz has worked with Les Claypool on various projects, including his performance on Claypool's album Of Fungi and Foe (on the track "Bite Out of Life").

Hütz appeared on the cover of the May 2013 issue of the Ukraine edition of Vogue, with Estonian model Kätlin Aas.

In November 2023 started his own label Casa Gogol and announced the first two signees - punk group Puzzled Panther and singer-songwriter Grace Bergere.

In 2024 took part in recording of Puzzled Panther's self-titled EP as producer and musician.

== Influence ==
In the 2006 movie Wristcutters: A Love Story, the character of Eugene (played by Shea Whigham) is based on Hütz. Several of Hütz's songs are featured in the film. Hütz was also the inspiration for the character Evgeni (played by Oscar Isaac) in Madonna's film W.E.

In the January 2008 Gucci menswear show in Milan, Hütz was cited as the key inspiration for the collection.

== Personal life ==
In October 2008, Hütz told the LA Weekly that he had moved to Rio de Janeiro, Brazil. In November 2009, he told Página/12 that he had moved to São Paulo.

== Filmography ==
Year	Title	Role	Notes
2004	Kill Your Idols	Himself	
2004	Kill Your Darlings	The Prince	Short film
2005	Everything Is Illuminated	Alex	
2006	The Pied Piper of Hützovina	Himself	
2008	Gogol Bordello Non-Stop	Himself	
2008	Filth and Wisdom	A.K.	
2012	Let Fury Have the Hour	Himself	
2023	Scream of My Blood: A Gogol Bordello Story	Himself	
