= Thomas Gobena =

Ethiopian bassist (born 1971)

Thomas Gobena in 2012

Thomas "Tommy T" Gobena (born 1971) is the former bassist for Gypsy punk band Gogol Bordello. He is of Ethiopian descent and was born in Addis Ababa, the capital of Ethiopia. He moved to Washington D.C. in 1987 at the age of 16, and joined Gogol Bordello in 2006. Aside from his work with Gogol Bordello, he also has released one solo album titled The Prester John Sessions.
