= Gogol Bordello =

American punk band

- Gogol Bordello performing at the HISTORY in Ottawa, Ontario in 2026.

Background information
- Also known as: Hutz and the Bela Bartoks (1999)
- Origin: New York City, New York, U.S.
- Genres: Punk rock; folk punk; Latin rock; polka; folk rock; dub; Romani; gypsy punk
- Years active: 1999–present
- Labels: Rubric; SideOneDummy; Columbia; MapleMusic
- Members: Eugene Hütz; Sergey Ryabtsev; Pasha Newmer; Leo Mintek; Gill Alexandre; Korey Kingston; Pedro Erazo; Erica Mancini
- Past members: Ori Kaplan; Thomas Gobena; Alfredo Ortiz; Pamela Racine; Pasha Newmer; Michael Ward; Ashley Tobias "TOBI"; Elizabeth Sun; Eliot Ferguson; Karl Alvarez; Rea Mochiach; Sasha Kazatchkoff; Vlad Solovar; Vanessa Walters; Katheryn McGaffigan; Andra Ursuta; Susan Donaldson; Chris Tattersall; Piroska Racz; Yuri Lemeshev
- Website: gogolbordello.com

Gogol Bordello is an American punk rock band from the Lower East Side of Manhattan, formed in 1999 by musicians from all over the world and known for theatrical stage shows and persistent touring. Much of the band's sound is inspired by Romani and Ukrainian music mixed with punk and dub, incorporating accordion and violin (and on some albums, saxophone).

The band has appeared in several popular films, most notably Everything Is Illuminated (2005) in which lead singer Eugene Hütz co-starred with Elijah Wood in a dramedy/adventure story about the Nazi purges in Ukraine. The group appears playing a brass band in a set that included the "Star-Spangled Banner" and the traditional Yiddish song "Bublitschki". Gogol Bordello contributed the song "Start Wearing Purple" to the film's score. The band is the focus of the 2008 documentary Gogol Bordello Non-Stop. The band recorded the song "Let's Get Crazy" for Coca-Cola's Euro 2012 advertising campaign.

== History and influences ==
"Gogol" comes from Nikolai Gogol, a 19th-century writer of Ukrainian origin. He serves as an ideological influence for the band because he "smuggled" Ukrainian culture into Russian society, which Gogol Bordello intends to do with Romani/East-European music in the English-speaking world. "Bordello", in Italian, refers to a brothel or a "gentleman's club". The band was originally titled Hütz and the Béla Bartóks, but Eugene Hütz says that they decided to change the name because "nobody knows who the hell Béla Bartók is in the United States." The band played their first show as the unofficial band at an after-hours club called Pizdetz where they became the house band and DJ Hütz became the house DJ.

Gogol Bordello's first single was released in 1999, and since then they have released eleven full-length albums, and one EP. In 2005 the band signed to punk label SideOneDummy Records. On 27 April 2010 Gogol Bordello made its major record label debut with Transcontinental Hustle on Rick Rubin's American Recordings, a subsidiary of Columbia Records/Sony Music Entertainment. Many of the songs on Transcontinental Hustle were inspired by Hütz's move to Brazil.

The band has toured extensively throughout Europe and America. They have made numerous appearances at international festivals and have toured with such diverse bands as Primus, Flogging Molly, and Cake. In an interview with NPR, frontman Eugene Hütz cites Jimi Hendrix and Parliament-Funkadelic as among the band's main musical influences. They have also mentioned Manu Chao, Fugazi, Zvuki Mu, Karamelo Santo, Sasha Kolpakov and The Clash as influences.

They performed live at the Bonnaroo Music and Arts festival 2011 for Bonnaroo's 10 year anniversary, playing a 1.5 hour set in the middle of the night and performed with Devotchka.

Gogol Bordello released "Let's Get Crazy" in 2012, the new song was part of Coca-Cola's advertising campaign for the European Football Championships, which were part-hosted by Ukraine. The track samples one of their earlier singles, "Wonderlust King", and the Coca-Cola advertising jingle.

In 2012 former guitarist Oren Kaplan sued Hütz for personal damages.

The 2010 song "Immigraniada" was remixed by Bassnectar.

Following the 2022 Russian invasion of Ukraine, Hütz released a video on social media condemning the Russian invasion, and has remained vocal about raising relief funds for the victims of the invasion. Gogol Bordello announced a benefit concert shortly after which sold out quickly, followed by announcing a benefit tour. Bordello collaborated with Les Claypool of the band Primus on the song "Man with the Iron Balls", praising Ukrainian president Volodymyr Zelenskyy's courage. The proceeds of the track are set to benefit Nova Ukraine, a non-profit organization that provides humanitarian relief to the people of Ukraine.

== Film appearances ==
- 2004 – Kill Your Idols – Hütz was interviewed in this documentary about New York's "art punk" music scene.
- 2005 – Everything Is Illuminated – In Liev Schreiber's directorial debut, which stars Elijah Wood, the role of Alexander Perchov was played by Eugene Hütz. It includes cameo appearances by other Gogol Bordello members in the train scene.
- 2006 – The Pied Piper of Hützovina – Documentary by Pavla Fleischer about a road trip she and Eugene Hütz took to Ukraine to trace his roots.
- 2006 – Wristcutters: A Love Story – "Eugene", played by American actor Shea Whigham, is partly based on Eugene Hütz, whose music ("Through the Roof and Underground", "Occurrence on the Border", and "Huliganjetta") is featured in the film as that recorded by the character's old band. Contrary to the belief that he has received no credit for this, the film credits show the copyrights for both Gogol Bordello songs, as well as giving thanks to Eugene multiple times throughout the credit roll.
- 2008 – Filth and Wisdom – The entire band appeared in this independent film directed by Madonna. Eugene Hütz is the protagonist. Madonna also allowed Eugene to add his own dialogue into the script.
- 2008 – Gogol Bordello Non-Stop – The development of the band was documented in this film directed by Margarita Jimeno. It follows the band's rise from underground legends to international fame from 2001 to 2007.
- 2009 – Larger Than Life in 3D – Live High-def digital concert footage shot in stereoscopic 3D at the Austin City Limits festival in October 2009.
- 2009 – Live From Axis Mundi: Professionally recorded live concert footage shot in New York.
- 2011 – Grain: Short film, 'Against the Nature' appears on the credits.
- 2013 – 'Not a crime' Grimm Season 2 Episode 18 "Volcanalis". Adalind Shade arrives at Rom camp
- 2017 – "American Wedding" Fargo Season 3 Episode 2 "The Principle of Restricted Choice" closing credits
- 2017 – "Risky Bismuth" The Tick Season 1 Episode 10 "Trans Continental Hustle" closing credits
- 2018 – "I Would Never Wanna Be Young Again" intro plays during monster wedding scene in Hotel Transylvania 3
- 2018 – "Through the Roof and Underground" plays in the closing credits of Smuggling Hendrix
- 2023 – "Scream of My Blood: A Gogol Bordello Story" is a documentary about Gogol Bordello.
- 2024 – Multiple Gogol Bordello songs, including "Start Wearing Purple" and "American Wedding", appear in the score of the first season of the DC Comics animated series Creature Commandos. The band also appeared as a cameo during the episode The Tourmaline Necklace, in a flashback sequence, while playing "American Wedding".

== Members ==
=== Details ===
Members of Gogol Bordello come from many places around the world.

Name	Instrument	Country	Tenure	Current?	Image
Eugene Hütz	lead vocals, acoustic guitar, percussion	Ukraine	1999–present	yes	Eugene Hütz live in 2025
Sergey Ryabtsev	violin, backing vocals	Russia	2000–present	yes	Sergey Ryabtsev in 2025
Pedro Erazo	percussion, MC	Ecuador	2007–present	yes	Pedro Erazo in 2025
Korey Kingston	Drums, percussion		2020–present	yes	in 2025
Gil Alexandre	Bass, backing vocals	Brazil	2021–present	yes	in 2025
Erica Mancini	Accordion, backing vocals		2023–present	yes	in 2025
Pamela Jintana Racine	percussion, backing vocals, dance, general performance	United States	1999–2017		
Eliot Ferguson	drums, backing vocals	United States	1999–2009		
Sasha Kazatchkoff	accordion		1999		
Vlad Solovar	guitar		1999		
Oren Kaplan	guitar, backing vocals	Israel	2000–2012		
Yuri Lemeshev	accordion, backing vocals	Russia	2001–2013		Yuri Lemeshev in 2012
Ori Kaplan	saxophone, backing vocals	Israel	no relation to Oren Kaplan, co-leads Balkan Beat Box with Tamir Muskat		in 2007
Katheryn McGaffigan	percussion, backing vocals, dance, general performance	United States	2001, 2002, 2005		
Susan Donaldson	percussion, backing vocals, dance, general performance		2002–2003		
Andra Ursuța	percussion, backing vocals, dance, general performance	Romania	2003–2006		
Chris Tattersall	drums, backing vocals	United Kingdom	2004		
Elizabeth Sun	percussion, backing vocals, dance, general performance	China and Scotland	2004–2016		
Rea Mochiach	bass, percussion, electronics and beat programming in the studio, backing vocals	Israel	2005		
Karl Alvarez	bass	United States	2006		in 2014
Oliver Charles	drums	United States	2009–2016		
Michael Ward	guitar	United States	2011–15		
Pasha Newmer	accordion; backing vocals	Belarus	2013–2018		Pasha Newmer in concert in 2014
James Ward	accordion	Scotland	????		
Kristian Mangieri	harmonica, general performance		????-????		
Thomas ‘Tommy T’ Gobena	Bass, backing vocals		2006–2021		
Alfredo Ortiz	Drums		2016–2020		
Vanessa Walters	percussion, backing vocals, general performance		2016–2018		
Ashley Tobias "TOBI"	backing vocals, dance, percussion, general performance	United States	2017–2024		
Boris Pelekh	guitar, backing vocals	Russia	2015–2024		Boris Pelekh in 2016

== Discography ==
=== Albums ===
- Voi-La Intruder (1999)
- Multi Kontra Culti vs. Irony (2002)
- Gypsy Punks: Underdog World Strike (2005)
- Super Taranta! (2007)
- Live From Axis Mundi (2009)
- Trans-Continental Hustle (2010)
- Моя Цыганиада (2011)
- Pura Vida Conspiracy (2013)
- Seekers and Finders (2017)
- Solidaritine (2022)
- We Mean It, Man! (2026)

=== Split albums ===
- J.U.F. (with Tamir Muskat) (2004)

=== EPs ===
- East Infection (2005)

=== Compilations ===
- Punk Rock Strike Vol. 4 (2003)
- 2005 Warped Tour Compilation (2005)
- 2006 Warped Tour Compilation (2006)
- Gypsy Beats and Balkan Bangers (2006)
- The Rough Guide to Planet Rock (2006)
- 2007 Warped Tour Compilation (2007)
