= Yuri Lemeshev =

American punk accordionist (born 1954/5)

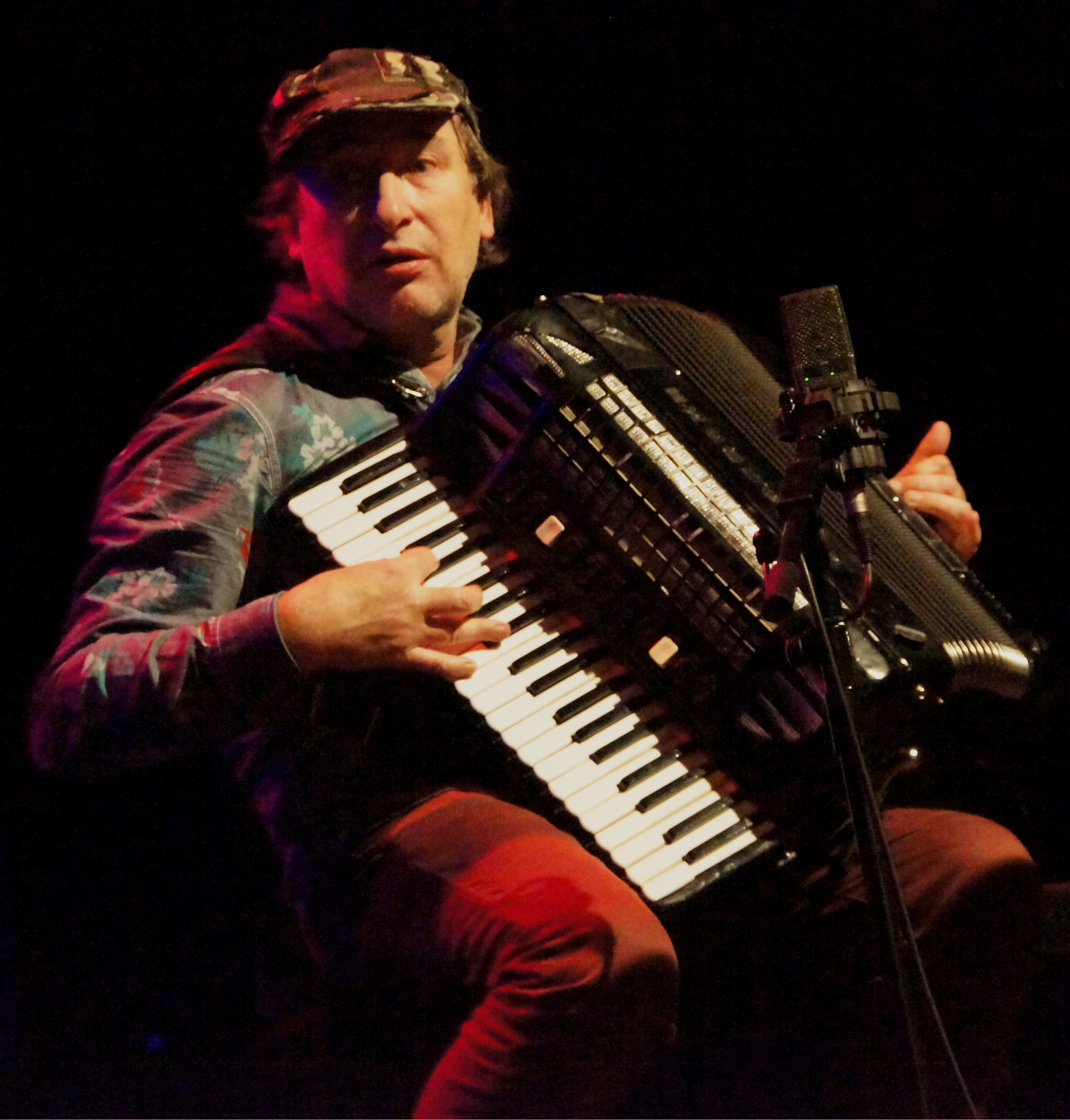
- Lemeshev in 2015

Background information
- Born: 1954/5 (aged 70–72); Sakhalin, RSFSR, Soviet Union
- Genres: Gypsy punk; folk punk
- Occupation: Musician
- Instrument: Accordion
- Years active: 1990s–present
- Formerly of: Tridruga; Gogol Bordello

Yuri Lemeshev (born 1954 or 1955) is an American accordion player and former member of the gypsy punk band Gogol Bordello.

== Biography ==
Lemeshev was born on the island of Sakhalin, RSFSR, Soviet Union. In 1989, he emigrated to the United States. He became popular in the East Village of New York City for his performances in bistros, wearing various hats and wigs. He has shared the stage and recorded with Nicole Renaud, Greg Wall, Mary Wooten, and Matt Darriau, and worked in a trio called Tridruga with bassist Tony Scherr and guitarist Brad Shepik. In 2001, he joined Gogol Bordello, leaving the band in 2013.

He started a duo with theremin player Pamelia Kurstin in 2007.

== Discography ==
- Yuri Lemeshev Solo – Live at Jules (Tillotson, 1995)
- Tridruga (Love Slave, 2000)
