= Ayo (Bomba Estéreo album) =

Studio album by Bomba Estéreo
- Released: August 11, 2017
- Genre: Cumbia
- Language: Spanish; English
- Label: Sony Music
- Producer: Chris Castagno

Bomba Estéreo chronology
Amanecer (2015)	Ayo (2017)	Deja (2021)

Professional ratings
Review scores
Source	Rating
AllMusic	4/5 stars

Ayo is the fifth studio album by Colombian band Bomba Estéreo, released on August 11, 2017. It is a cumbia album with elements of modern dance music and Spanglish lyrics. It reached number 28 on the US Top Latin Albums chart.

== Background and production ==
The album was created following the band's success with the video for "Soy Yo", which was called an "anthem of Latinx identity" by NPR, and said to contain a "message of individuality and self-love". It also inspired art and Halloween costumes. Ayo was noted as following from this sound, being created soon after the viral reaction to the video.

The band began working with producer Chris Castagno in order to compose a song with rhythm from a flauta de millo. This resulted in "Duele", the first song released from the album. The song was pointed out as picking up where the final song on Amanecer, "Raíz" left off, in terms of instrumentation. The album was inspired by and composed in the Sierra Nevada mountain range of Colombia, emerging from a "spiritual ceremony" that took place with the Kogi people that live there. The album contains "ancestral influences" and Colombian instruments, including the gaita, a type of flute. Simón Mejía said the album "returns to the Caribbean sonic roots of Bomba Estéreo while at the same time, keeps looking at the world with open eyes and open ears, taking risks on new paths".

The album is their first without guitarist Julián Salazar since their first album.

== Music and lyrics ==
Along with traditional Colombian instrumentation, the album contains dance tracks—"Taganga" also contains a reggae sound, and "Internacionales" was noted for its "party-pleas[ing]" qualities and lyrics that proclaim: "Mezclados, somos todos mezclados, venimos de todos lados, la misma historia con otro sabor (Mixed, we are all mixed, we come from everywhere, the same history with different flavors)." The Huffington Post said the song "seems to touch on the anti-immigrant and anti-Latino rhetoric that has dominated U.S. politics in recent years". The opening track "Siembra", which was also utilised to open many of the band's 2017 concerts, was noted for its lyrics about planning for the future and being aware of humans' place in the universe. Simón Mejía said of the song: "It's a message about the land, that has a lot to do with what's happening at an environmental level. It's a beautiful song, thought for our children."

Billboard also noted it as a "party album". Mejía said that the album contains "more African guitars, live percussion, more folklore" than their previous releases.

== Cover art ==
The album cover depicts papaya seeds "spilling out of a spiral conch shell". According to NPR, it alludes to the type of conch-shell trumpets used by First Nations peoples of North America.

== Track listing ==
Track listing adapted from iTunes.

No.	Title	Writer(s)	Length
1.	"Siembra"	Simón Mejía; Liliana Saumet; Christian Castagno	4:18
2.	"Ayo"	Mejía; Saumet; Joe Spargur; Eric Frederic; Franklin Montaño	2:53
3.	"Química (Dance with Me)" (featuring Balkan Beat Box)	Mejía; Saumet; Ori Kaplan; Tomer Yosef; Tamir Muskat; Uri Kinrot; Itamar Ziegler; Frederic; Spargur	2:42
4.	"Duele"	Mejía; Saumet; Castagno	3:44
5.	"Amar Así"	Mejía; Saumet; Castagno	3:57
6.	"Money Money Money..."	Mejía; Saumet; Castagno	2:48
7.	"Internacionales"	Mejía; Saumet; Edgar Barrera; Camilo Echeverry; Andrés Castro; Descemer Bueno; Spargur; Frederic; Mauricio Reglero	3:07
8.	"Flower Power"	Mejía; Saumet; Castagno	3:18
9.	"Taganga"	Mejía; Saumet; Frederic; Spargur	2:45
10.	"Vuelve"	Mejía; Saumet; Castagno	5:11

== Charts ==
Chart (2017)	Peak position
US Top Latin Albums (Billboard)	28
