= Hermetico =

Song by Balkan Beat Box

from the album Nu Med
- Released: 2007
- Genre: World
- Length: 5:08
- Label: JDub, Crammed Discs
- Songwriters: Tamir Muskat; Ori Kaplan; Tomer Yosef
- Producer: Balkan Beat Box

"Hermetico" is a song by the Israeli-American electronica-world fusion band Balkan Beat Box. Written by band members Tamir Muskat, Ori Kaplan and Tomer Yosef, it was included in the band's second album Nu Med released in 2007, soon becoming a signature tune of the band.

== Sampling ==
The song enjoyed great popularity after Jason Derulo sampled part of the song in his 2013 released single "Talk Dirty" with producer Ricky Reed (a.k.a. Wallpaper) interpolating the distinctive Balkan musical segment to the Derulo song.
