= Blue Eyed Black Boy =

Studio album by Balkan Beat Box
- Released: 27 April 2010
- Recorded: 2009
- Genre: World music, gypsy punk, electronica, funk, dub
- Length: 48:46
- Label: Nat Geo Music, Crammed Discs
- Producer: Balkan Beat Box

Balkan Beat Box chronology
Nu Made (Remixes) (2009)	Blue Eyed Black Boy (2010)	Give (2012)

Professional ratings
Review scores
Source	Rating
AllMusic	3.5/5 stars
The Independent	(positive)
Robert Christgau	A−

Blue Eyed Black Boy is the third studio album by the Israeli electronica-world fusion trio Balkan Beat Box.

== Track listing ==
No.	Title	Length
1.	"Intro"	0:31
2.	"Move It"	3:56
3.	"Blue Eyed Black Boy"	3:22
4.	"Marcha de la Vida"	4:08
5.	"Dancing with the Moon"	3:48
6.	"Kabulectro"	3:44
7.	"My Baby"	4:06
8.	"Balkumbia"	3:20
9.	"Look Them Act"	3:30
10.	"Smatron"	3:50
11.	"Lijepa Mare"	3:36
12.	"Why"	3:07
13.	"Buhala"	4:39
14.	"War Again"	3:08

== Personnel ==
- Tomer Yosef - lead vocals, percussion, samples
- Ori Kaplan - saxophone
- Tamir Muskat - drums, percussion, programming
