= Give (Balkan Beat Box album) =

Studio album by Balkan Beat Box
- Released: 6 March 2012
- Recorded: 2011
- Genre: World music, gypsy punk, electronica, funk, dub
- Label: Nat Geo Music, Crammed Discs
- Producer: Balkan Beat Box

Balkan Beat Box chronology
Blue Eyed Black Boy (2010)	Give (2012)

Give is the fourth studio album by the Israeli electronica-world fusion trio Balkan Beat Box.

== Critical reception ==
Professional ratings
Review scores
Source	Rating
Consequence of Sound	D-
The Independent	5/5 stars
The Province	B+
Robert Christgau	A-
Spin	7/10

Give received generally favorable reviews from critics, with the exception of a D− from Consequence of Sound's Alex Young. Young wrote that on the album, "the band is able to put checkmarks in all the Balkan Beat Box boxes but fail to meet the standards they set previously in any of them."

== Track listing ==
No.	Title	Length
1.	"Intro (Taste of Where I'm From)"	3:24
2.	"Part of the Glory"	4:13
3.	"Political F**k"	3:45
4.	"Money"	3:12
5.	"Suki Muki"	3:56
6.	"Porno Clown"	3:34
7.	"Minimal"	3:55
8.	"Urge to Be Violent"	3:35
9.	"Look Like You"	4:26
10.	"What a Night"	4:23
11.	"Enemy On Economy"	3:42
12.	"No Man's Land"	3:59

== Charts ==
Chart (2015)	Peak position
New Zealand Albums (Recorded Music NZ)	20

== Personnel ==
- Tomer Yosef - lead vocals, percussion, samples
- Ori Kaplan - saxophone
- Tamir Muskat - drums, percussion, programming
