= Popstar: Never Stop Never Stopping =

2016 American mockumentary comedy film

- Theatrical release poster
- Directed by: Akiva Schaffer; Jorma Taccone
- Written by: Andy Samberg; Akiva Schaffer; Jorma Taccone
- Produced by: Judd Apatow; Rodney Rothman; Andy Samberg; Akiva Schaffer; Jorma Taccone
- Starring: Andy Samberg; Jorma Taccone; Akiva Schaffer; Sarah Silverman; Tim Meadows
- Cinematography: Brandon Trost
- Edited by: Jamie Gross; Craig Alpert; Stacey Schroeder
- Music by: Matthew Compton
- Production companies: Perfect World Pictures; Apatow Company; The Lonely Island
- Distributed by: Universal Pictures
- Release dates: May 24, 2016 (New York City); June 3, 2016 (United States)
- Running time: 87 minutes
- Country: United States
- Language: English
- Budget: $20 million
- Box office: $9.7 million

Popstar: Never Stop Never Stopping is a 2016 American mockumentary musical comedy film directed by Akiva Schaffer and Jorma Taccone from a screenplay written by and starring Andy Samberg, Taccone, and Schaffer. The trio, collectively known as The Lonely Island, also co-produced the film with Judd Apatow and Rodney Rothman. Sarah Silverman, Tim Meadows, Imogen Poots, Joan Cusack, Maya Rudolph, and Chris Redd appear in supporting roles.

The film was released on June 3, 2016, by Universal Pictures, and became a box-office bomb, grossing just over $9 million against a budget of $20 million. It received generally positive reviews from critics, and has since developed a cult following.

== Plot ==
Conner Friel, a musical prodigy, forms a pop rap group dubbed "The Style Boyz" with his childhood friends, Lawrence Dunn and Owen Bouchard. They almost instantly gain fame in the music industry and inspire many modern musicians, who extol Conner and the group in mock interviews. However, after not receiving credit for writing a guest verse that propelled Conner to stardom (the Catchphrase Verse), Lawrence leaves the group.

After the Style Boyz disband, Conner begins a solo act, taking on the name "Conner4Real", with Owen as his DJ. Lawrence begins farming in Colorado after a failed attempt at going solo. Conner's debut album Thriller, Also rockets to the top of the charts, and his fame increases.

After releasing singles "Equal Rights", "Mona Lisa", and "Ibithia", Conner releases his highly anticipated second album, Connquest. As he wrote every song himself and used hundreds of different producers rather than Owen's original beats, the album is universally panned and a commercial failure. Because of the album's low sales, Conner's manager Harry suggests having Aquaspin, a home appliance manufacturer, sponsor the tour. The company's appliances begin playing Conner's songs when in use, causing a nationwide power outage.

Conner begins his tour, but the shows do not sell as well as he had hoped. Harry suggests they hire up-and-coming rapper Hunter the Hungry as an opening act, and the ticket sales begin to rise. Conner adds new gimmicks to his act, including a robotic mask for Owen, who feels increasingly ostracized, and publicizes his relationship with actress Ashley Wednesday. However, when a trick is botched in Nashville, Conner is exposed naked (without his penis visible) mid-concert and becomes the subject of mockery. Conner's publicist Paula Klein suggests he pull another publicity stunt to deflect attention from his humiliation.

Conner decides to propose to his girlfriend Ashley on E! with a display including several trained Party Wolves and a performance by Seal. However, Seal's vocals agitate the wolves, causing them to break loose, mauling everyone, including Seal. As a result of the incident, Conner is sued by Seal and Ashley breaks up with him, later marrying Seal. Conner and Owen appear as guests on The Tonight Show Starring Jimmy Fallon, and the two perform the "Donkey Roll", the Style Boyz's biggest hit, onstage, which is humiliating for Conner but gratifying for Owen.

Worried about the declining quality of his friend's music, Owen attempts to set up a Parent Trap-meeting between himself, Conner, and Lawrence in the hopes of bringing them back together; the reunion ends poorly when Conner continues to refuse to acknowledge that Lawrence wrote the Catchphrase Verse.

As the solo tour progresses, Hunter's career takes off, selling more records than Conner and extending the length of his opening performances. At one of the concerts, Hunter announces that he will not leave the stage, angering Conner; a brawl ensues when Hunter admits that he orchestrated Conner's wardrobe malfunction. Conner demands that Harry fire Hunter as the opener, but when Harry refuses, he discovers that Harry has signed Hunter. Feeling betrayed and frustrated with his declining popularity, Conner fires Harry. Connquest is later knocked off the charts and Aquaspin decides to pull their sponsorship. The remainder of the Connquest tour is cancelled.

Conner's feelings of betrayal spark him to test the loyalty of Owen and his yes men by making them pancakes mixed with dog feces. Owen, offended that Conner considered him among his "lackeys", quits. After this, and the death of his beloved pet turtle Maximus, Conner sinks into a depression, becomes increasingly erratic, and eventually moves back to Sacramento in his mother's home. Checking up on Conner, Paula forces him to leave the house and takes him to a club where Owen is performing a DJ set of his own. Under the cloak of the music and a shoddy disguise, Conner comes to realize how poorly he has conducted himself in recent months.

Owen's production skills but lack of singing ability in the set cause Conner and Owen to realize how much they need each other. They reconcile and decide to finally make amends with Lawrence. In Colorado, Conner apologizes to Lawrence, finally acknowledges that Lawrence wrote the Catchphrase Verse, and gives him the Poppy music award he won for the song. It is revealed that Lawrence grows marijuana on his farm, and as the three get high and collaborate in Lawrence's studio, Conner receives news from Paula that a six-minute slot has opened for Conner to perform at the Poppys. With encouragement from Owen and Lawrence, he decides to both reunite the Style Boyz and continue his work as Conner4Real.

At the Poppys, Hunter gets into an argument on stage while presenting an award, and Harry quits as his manager after he insults him backstage; Conner reconciles with Harry. Conner then finds out that the six-minute slot has been shortened to three, forcing him to perform either a Conner4Real song or a Style Boyz song. Conner decides to perform the Style Boyz's new song "Incredible Thoughts" featuring Michael Bolton. Afterwards, he reflects on the lessons he learned and the value of holding onto relationships after reaching stardom.

== Cast ==
- Andy Samberg as Conner "Kid Conner" Friel / Conner4Real, a pop rap star and former Style Boy.
  - Evan Fine as 10-year-old Conner.
- Jorma Taccone as Owen "Kid Contact" Bouchard, a former Style Boy and Conner's current DJ.
  - Maxwell Jenkins as 10-year-old Owen.
- Akiva Schaffer as Lawrence "Kid Brain" Dunn, a former Style Boy and songwriter who moved to Colorado and became a farmer following the group's breakup.
  - Elliott Smith as 10-year-old Lawrence.
- Sarah Silverman as Paula Klein, Conner's publicist.
- Tim Meadows as Harry Duggins, Conner's manager.
- Maya Rudolph as Deborah, a representative for Aquaspin.
- Joan Cusack as Tilly Friel, Conner's supportive and party-animal mother.
- Imogen Poots as Ashley Wednesday, an actress and Conner's girlfriend.
- Chris Redd as Hunter the Hungry, an underground rapper who tours with Conner.
- Edgar Blackmon and James Buckley as Eddie and Sponge, members of Conner's entourage who serve as his yes men.

The rest of Conner's staff include: Ashley Moore as Sarah, his personal assistant; Bill Hader as Zippy, a roadie; Danny Strong as his perspective manipulator; Will Forte as his bagpipe player; and Justin Timberlake as Tyrus Quash (uncredited), Conner's chef who later dresses as Mr. Fish during the Style Boyz performance at the Poppys.

Will Arnett, Eric André, Mike Birbiglia, and Chelsea Peretti portray CMZ reporters, a parody of TMZ. Kevin Nealon appears as photographer Gary Sikes, and Paul Scheer plays one of the Party Wolves handlers at Conner and Ashley's engagement ceremony who asks Harry to stop Seal's singing as it's driving the wolves crazy. Emma Stone makes an uncredited cameo as Claudia Cantrell, a well-known pop singer who helped kickstart Conner's solo career, and "Weird Al" Yankovic appears as the lead singer of Hammerleg. The wives of Samberg, Taccone, and Schaffer all make brief appearances: Joanna Newsom (Samberg's wife) as Zippy's flatline doctor, Marielle Heller (Taccone's wife) as a member of Conner's documentary crew, and Liz Cackowski (Schaffer's wife) as the Poppies stage manager. Judd Apatow voices one of Conner's fans.

Cameos as themselves

- 50 Cent
- Akon
- ASAP Rocky
- Big Boy
- Michael Bolton, who joins the Style Boyz in performing "Incredible Thoughts" at the Poppys.
- Win Butler
- Mariah Carey, who praises Conner and his music in a mock interview and later argues with Hunter at the Poppys.
- Régine Chassagne
- Simon Cowell
- Rita Ora
- Miley Cyrus
- Danger Mouse
- Snoop Dogg, who attends the Poppys while promoting his new TV show Surprise Motherfucka.
- DJ Khaled
- Jimmy Fallon, who interviews Conner and Owen on The Tonight Show Starring Jimmy Fallon.
- Steve Higgins
- Adam Levine
- Nas
- Katy Perry
- Pink
- Behati Prinsloo
- Questlove
- Rihanna
- The Roots
- RZA
- Seal, who performs at Conner's disastrous proposal to Ashley. In the film, Seal's scars are attributed to a previous wolf attack.
- Martin Sheen
- Ringo Starr
- Steven Tyler
- Asa Taccone
- T.I.
- Carrie Underwood
- Usher
- Pharrell Williams

== Production ==
Principal photography on the film began on May 14, 2015, announced by Universal Pictures under the working title Conner4real. The production filmed at The Forum for 11 days, with other crowd footage including repurposed material from Morgan Spurlock's documentary One Direction: This Is Us. Samberg also introduced Maroon 5 at the Honda Center while in character. There was over 300 hours of filmed footage, and the group ran several versions by Phil Lord and Christopher Miller, who had produced their 2005 pilot episode Awesometown.

== Release ==
The film was advertised on YouTube the month of its release date. On May 10, 2016, Samberg made an appearance on NBC's The Voice in character as Conner4real to perform "I'm So Humble", alongside judge Adam Levine, and give answers to contestants in a farcical Q&A session. Samberg then made a guest appearance on the season 41 finale of Saturday Night Live, on May 21, 2016. Promoted as a new SNL Digital Short, he appeared in character as Conner4real and debuted a song from the movie ("Finest Girl"). Taccone and Schaffer received guest writing credits for the episode. The Lonely Island also released a video "I'm a Weirdo" to their YouTube channel, featuring Conner4real rapping on the street.

The film was released in the United States on June 3, 2016, and in the United Kingdom on August 26, 2016, by Universal Pictures. It did not get an international release.

=== Home media ===
Popstar: Never Stop Never Stopping was released on Digital HD on August 16, 2016, and on Blu-ray and DVD on September 13, 2016, by Universal Pictures Home Entertainment. As of June 16, 2017, it had made $1.1 million in home media sales. Shout! Factory released the film on Blu-ray on November 12, 2019, which included the previous special features in a limited edition steelbook case.

== Soundtrack ==
Popstar: Never Stop Never Stopping

Soundtrack album by The Lonely Island
- Released: June 3, 2016
- Genres: Pop rap; comedy rap
- Length: 48:53
- Label: Republic
- Producers: Alex Delicata; Arthur McArthur; CHOPS; DallasK; Deputy; DJ Frank E; Donut; the Exclusives; Go Grizzly; Greg Kurstin; Hood Famous; Jacob Plant; Kinetics & One Love; Maestro Harrell; Michael Woods; the Monarch; Nathaniel Motte; Needlz; Oddfellow; soFLY & Nius; Stress; Sultan Banks

The Lonely Island chronology
The Wack Album (2013)	Popstar: Never Stop Never Stopping (2016)	The Unauthorized Bash Brothers Experience (2019)

Singles from Popstar: Never Stop Never Stopping — Original Motion Picture Soundtrack
- 1. "I'm So Humble" Released: May 10, 2016; 2. "Mona Lisa" Released: May 10, 2016; 3. "Finest Girl (Bin Laden Song)" Released: May 22, 2016

The Popstar: Never Stop Never Stopping soundtrack album, performed by the Lonely Island, was released on June 3, 2016, the day of the film's release.

=== Track listing ===
No.	Title	Writer(s)	Producer(s)	Length
1.	"I'm So Humble" (featuring Adam Levine)	Andy Samberg; Akiva Schaffer; Jorma Taccone; Can Canatan; Al Hoffman; John Klenner	Stress	2:33
2.	"Hot New Single (Dialogue)"	Samberg; Schaffer; Taccone		0:12
3.	"Equal Rights" (featuring Pink)	Samberg; Schaffer; Taccone; Raphael Judrin; Pierre-Antoine Melki; Yoan Chirescu	soFLY & Nius; Oddfellow	2:25
4.	"Turn Up the Beef" (featuring Emma Stone)	Samberg; Schaffer; Taccone; Michael Woods; Kevin White; B. Osipenko	Woods	2:03
5.	"Finest Girl (Bin Laden Song)"	Samberg; Schaffer; Taccone; Woods; White; Nash Overstreet	Woods	2:30
6.	"Mona Lisa"	Samberg; Schaffer; Taccone; Khari Cain; Brandon Bell	Needlz; Donut	2:38
7.	"Are or Aren't? (Dialogue)"	Samberg; Schaffer; Taccone		0:13
8.	"Hunter the Hungry Is Gon’ Eat" (featuring Chris Redd)	Samberg; Schaffer; Taccone; Jamil Pierre	Deputy	2:03
9.	"Should I Move?" (featuring Akon)	Samberg; Schaffer; Taccone; Nathaniel Motte	Motte	2:19
10.	"2 Banditos" (featuring Chris Redd)	Samberg; Schaffer; Taccone; Justin Franks; Tamir Muskat; Ori Kaplan; Tomer Yosef	DJ Frank E	1:56
11.	"Things in My Jeep" (featuring Linkin Park)	Samberg; Schaffer; Taccone; Derek Allen; Maestro Harrell	Harrell	2:06
12.	"Kill This Music (Dialogue)"	Samberg; Schaffer; Taccone		0:06
13.	"Ashley Wednesday" (featuring Seal)	Samberg; Schaffer; Taccone; Cain; Bell	Needlz; Donut	2:30
14.	"F**k Off"	Samberg; Schaffer; Taccone; Andre Davidson; Sean Davidson; Jordan Suecof; Alex Delicata	The Monarch; Delicata	2:25
15.	"Donkey Roll"	Samberg; Schaffer; Taccone; Canatan	Stress	1:23
16.	"Trip to Spain (Dialogue)"	Samberg; Schaffer; Taccone		0:21
17.	"Ibitha"	Samberg; Schaffer; Taccone; R. Witherspoon Jr.; Dallas Koehlke	DallasK	1:40
18.	"Owen's Song"	Samberg; Schaffer; Taccone; Greg Kurstin	Kurstin	1:38
19.	"What Was That Beat? (Dialogue)"	Samberg; Schaffer; Taccone		0:16
20.	"Sick Glenda"	Samberg; Schaffer; Taccone; Scott Jung; Mike Baxter	CHOPS	1:00
21.	"Incredible Thoughts" (featuring Michael Bolton and Justin Timberlake as "Mr. Fish")	Andrew Samberg; Jorma Taccone; Tim Sommers; Jeremy Dussolliet	Kinetics & One Love	2:56
22.	"Me Likey Dat"	Samberg; Schaffer; Taccone; Jung; Baxter	CHOPS	1:06
23.	"Legalize It"	Samberg; Schaffer; Taccone; Jacob Plant	Plant	2:52
24.	"I'm a Weirdo"	Samberg; Schaffer; Taccone; Sultan Banks	Banks	1:51
25.	"Karate Guy"	Samberg; Schaffer; Taccone; August Alsina; Candace Curry; Ralph Jeanty; Nicodemo Lalli; Sean McMillian; Kevin Price; Keyiara Sallie	The Exclusives; Go Grizzly; Hood Famous	2:17
26.	"Rock Roll Skate"	Samberg; Schaffer; Taccone		1:56
27.	"Hey Ya Ho" (featuring Chris Redd)	Samberg; Schaffer; Taccone; Jeremy McArthur; Andrew Papaleo	Arthur McArthur	1:25
28.	"Maximus" (Bonus Track)	Samberg; Schaffer; Taccone		2:22

=== Charts ===
Chart (2016)	Peak position
Canadian Albums (Billboard)	74
US Billboard 200	69
US Top Comedy Albums (Billboard)	1
US Top Rap Albums (Billboard)	6
US Soundtrack Albums (Billboard)	3

== Reception ==
=== Box office ===
In the United States, Popstar: Never Stop Never Stopping opened on June 3, 2016, alongside Me Before You and Teenage Mutant Ninja Turtles: Out of the Shadows and was expected to gross around $7 million from 2,311 theaters in its opening weekend. The film grossed $322,000 from its Thursday previews and $1.8 million on its first day. In its opening weekend, the film grossed $4.6 million and finishing 8th at the box office. The film was a box office bomb, grossing just $9.5 million against its $20 million budget.

=== Critical response ===
On the review aggregator website Rotten Tomatoes, 79% of 172 critics' reviews are positive, with an average rating of 6.7/10. The website's consensus reads: "Popstar: Never Stop Never Stopping updates the rock mockumentary for the 21st century mainstream – and hits many of its low-hanging targets with side-splitting impact." Metacritic, which uses a weighted average, assigned the film a score of 68 out of 100, based on 43 critics, indicating "generally favorable" reviews. Audiences polled by CinemaScore gave the film an average grade of "B" on an A+ to F scale.

Vince Mancini of Uproxx gave the film a positive review, saying: "It's as stupid as it is relevant, and that layering of humor styles — insightful satire, no-holds-barred vulgarity, irresistible juvenilia, surreal pop art, timeless deadpan — are Popstar‘s hallmark. It's smart, dumb, silly, and gross in all the right ways. I loved it." David Palmer of The Reel Deal gave the film 8/10, calling it the best comedy of 2016 and praised the songs.

Ignatiy Vishnevetsky of The A.V. Club wrote: "No music mockumentary has really managed to reproduce This Is Spinal Tap's comic mojo, but Popstar: Never Stop Never Stopping gets closer than most to that subgenre-defining comedy's mix of the dead-on and the over-the-top, even if it tends to go for quantity over quality."

Despite the film's shortcomings at the box office, it has developed a cult following in the years since its release. Taccone called it "a love letter to our friendship" and Schaffer has said that "the fact that people thought it was good was the most important thing to me. It's great that people have found it over the last 10 years." Samberg said that "the fact that it has resonated and is still being discussed 10 years later is all we ever could've dreamed of."

== See also ==
- Blizzard Man – Samberg's SNL sketch about a questionable rapper.
