= Nu Made (Remixes) =

Remix album by Balkan Beat Box
- Released: 7 April 2009
- Genre: World music, electronica, funk, dub
- Label: JDub

Balkan Beat Box chronology
| Nu Med (2007) | Nu Made (Remixes) (2009) | Blue Eyed Black Boy (2010) |

Professional ratings
Review scores
| Source | Rating |
|---|---|
| BBC | (mixed) |
| Robert Christgau | (choice cut) |
| PopMatters | (5/10) |

Nu Made (Remixes) is a remix album by the Israeli electronica-world fusion trio Balkan Beat Box. The album features remixes of songs from their second studio album Nu Med.

== Track listing ==
| No. | Title | Length |
|---|---|---|
| 1. | "Habibi Min Zaman" (BBB Remix) | 5:16 |
| 2. | "Digital Monkey" (Soulico Remix) | 3:31 |
| 3. | "Adir Adirim" (Nickodemus Remix) | 5:22 |
| 4. | "Delancey" (Stefano Miele Balkan Carnival Remix) | 5:15 |
| 5. | "Hermetico" (Dub Gabriel/Kush Arora Remix) | 5:01 |
| 6. | "Joro Boro" (BBB Remix) | 2:50 |
| 7. | "Digital Monkey" (Cheffy Chef Remix) | 3:48 |
| 8. | "Red Bula" (Mahala Rai Banda Vs. BBB) | 4:38 |
| 9. | "Digital Monkey" (Puzzel Remix) | 3:35 |
| 10. | "Pachima" (UBK Remix) | 4:46 |
| 11. | "Habibi Min Zaman" (Mr. Tunes Remix) | 6:48 |
| 12. | "Ramallah Tel Aviv" (feat. Tomer Yosef and Saz) | 4:03 |
