= Nu Med =

Studio album by Balkan Beat Box
- Released: 15 May 2007
- Genre: World music, electronica, funk, gypsy punk
- Length: 50:10
- Label: JDub, Crammed Discs
- Producer: Balkan Beat Box

Balkan Beat Box chronology
Balkan Beat Box (2005)	Nu Med (2007)	Nu Made (Remixes) (2009)

Professional ratings
Review scores
Source	Rating
AllMusic	4/5 stars
Robert Christgau	A
The Guardian	3/5 stars
Pitchfork	7.4/10

Nu Med is an album by the Israeli electronica-world fusion trio Balkan Beat Box.

== Track listing ==
All tracks written by Tamir Muskat/Ori Kaplan, except tracks 2, 5, 9, and 13, by Tamir Muskat/Ori Kaplan/Tomer Yosef.

No.	Title	Length
1.	"Keep 'em Straight"	1:14
2.	"Hermetico"	5:08
3.	"Habibi Min Zaman"	3:52
4.	"BBBeat"	4:00
5.	"Digital Monkey"	3:43
6.	"Balcasio"	3:32
7.	"Pachima"	5:42
8.	"Quand Est-Ce Qu'on Arrive"	3:31
9.	"Mexico City"	3:45
10.	"Delancey"	3:12
11.	"Joro Boro"	3:41
12.	"Gypsy Queens"	3:31
13.	"$20 for Boban"	3:27
14.	"Baharim" (Outro)	1:52
