= Amanecer (Bomba Estéreo album) =

Studio album by Bomba Estéreo
- Released: June 2, 2015
- Genres: Latin; alternative
- Length: 40:45
- Language: Spanish
- Label: Sony Latin

Bomba Estéreo chronology
Elegancia tropical (2012)	Amanecer (2015)	Ayo (2017)

Professional ratings
Review scores
Source	Rating
Pitchfork	6.8/10

Amanecer is the fourth studio album by Colombian band Bomba Estéreo. It was released on June 2, 2015, through Sony Music Latin. The album earned Bomba Estéreo a Latin Grammy Award nomination for Best Alternative Music Album and a Grammy Award nomination for Best Latin Rock, Urban or Alternative Album. It peaked at number 17 on the Billboard Top Latin Albums chart. It was also named the best Latin album of 2015 by Rolling Stone.

It includes the viral hit "Soy Yo", which features child star Sarai Gonzalez and has received over 100 million views on YouTube. The song and video were called a "celebration of self and a symbol of proud Latinidad" and "an ode to brown girls". Lead singer Li Saumet half sings and half raps the lyrics of the repeated refrain "when they criticise you, you just say 'I am me'" (translated from Spanish) which is an obvious reference to the importance of self-confidence and pride in one’s identity.

== Track listing ==
No.	Title	Length
1.	"Amanecer"	4:08
2.	"Caderas"	2:55
3.	"Somos Dos"	3:59
4.	"Soy Yo"	2:39
5.	"Fiesta"	3:39
6.	"Voy"	3:16
7.	"Algo Está Cambiando"	4:29
8.	"Mar (Lo Que Siento)"	3:49
9.	"To My Love"	3:59
10.	"Sólo Tú"	4:14
11.	"Raíz"	3:38
Total length:		40:45

== Usage in media ==
In 2020, Grubhub used the song "Soy Yo" in a commercial that immediately gained attention in meme culture. The song can also be heard in Pitch Perfect 3 and during the end credits of Dora and the Lost City of Gold, commercials for The CW crime drama In the Dark, and commercials for the Samsung Galaxy S8 and Deezer. Pizzeria Pizza Napoletana, a restaurant specialized in Neapolitan pizza, also used this song when they sponsored the delivery service Just Eat in their Instagram stories. The song also appears in the soundtrack of the 2021 racing video game Forza Horizon 5. "Caderas" was featured as the diegetic soundtrack to the opening police-siege scenes of the 2019 American action-adventure film Triple Frontier. In 2021, a remix of this song was used in Illumination's Sing 2. The song was also featured in the 2015 sports game FIFA 16.

== Charts ==
Chart (2015)	Peak position
US Top Latin Albums (Billboard)	17

== Certifications ==
Region	Certification	Certified units/sales
Mexico (AMPROFON)	Gold	30,000^{‡}
United States (RIAA)	Gold (Latin)	30,000^{‡}
^{‡} Sales+streaming figures based on certification alone.
