= J.U.F. (album) =

Gogol Bordello vs. Tamir Muskat

Studio album by J.U.F.
- Released: 2004
- Genre: Gypsy punk, dub
- Length: 54:58
- Label: Stinky Records

Balkan Beat Box chronology
Gogol Bordello vs. Tamir Muskat (2004)	Balkan Beat Box (2005)

Gogol Bordello chronology
Multi Kontra Culti vs. Irony (2002)	Gogol Bordello vs. Tamir Muskat (2004)	East Infection (2005)

Professional ratings
Review scores
Source	Rating
Pitchfork Media	(5.2/10) link
Robert Christgau	(A−) link

J.U.F. is a collaboration between Gogol Bordello and Tamir Muskat released in 2004 by Stinky Records. The name—an abbreviation for Jewish Ukrainian Freundschaft—is inspired by German industrial band Deutsch Amerikanische Freundschaft, who got their name from the GDR state organization Society for German–Soviet Friendship (German: Gesellschaft für Deutsch-Sowjetische Freundschaft).

== Track listing ==
No.	Title	Length
1.	"Gypsy Part of Town"	4:55
2.	"When I Was a Little Spy"	4:53
3.	"Super Rifle (Balkan Express Train Robbery)"	5:02
4.	"J.U.F. Dub"	4:33
5.	"Bassar (Spanish Car Service Special)"	3:31
6.	"Last Wish of the Bride"	4:58
7.	"Onto Transmigration"	5:44
8.	"Balkanization of Amerikanization"	5:20
9.	"Roumania"	3:34
10.	"Panic So Charming (What the Fuck Style)"	3:53
11.	"Samiao's Day"	2:55
12.	"Muskat (Slishal, No Ne Zapisal)"	5:32
