= Polen Records =

Independent music label

- Founded: 2006
- Founder: Felipe Álvarez
- Genre: latin alternative, cumbia, electrocumbia
- Location: Bogotá, Colombia
- Official website: www.polenrecords.com

Polen Records is an independent music label based in Bogotá, Colombia, created in 2006 by producer Felipe Álvarez and musician and anthropologist Lucas Guingue. Polen Record's first release was Los Días Adelante (2006) by Bajo Tierra, followed that same year by Bomba Estéreo's debut EP, Vol.1, and Chocquibtown's Somos Pacífico. In 2008 Polen released the Bomba Estéreo album Estalla, which included the international hit Fuego.

== History ==
In 2013, they had an album nominated for the Latin Grammy Awards with Bomba Estéreo's album Elegancia Tropical (2012) as Best Alternative Music Album.

== Notable artists ==
- Bomba Estéreo
- Sidestepper
- Bareto
- Systema Solar

== See also ==
- Codiscos
- Discos Fuentes
