= Society for German–Soviet Friendship =

East German organization

Society for German-Soviet Friendship
- Gesellschaft für Deutsch-Sowjetische Freundschaft
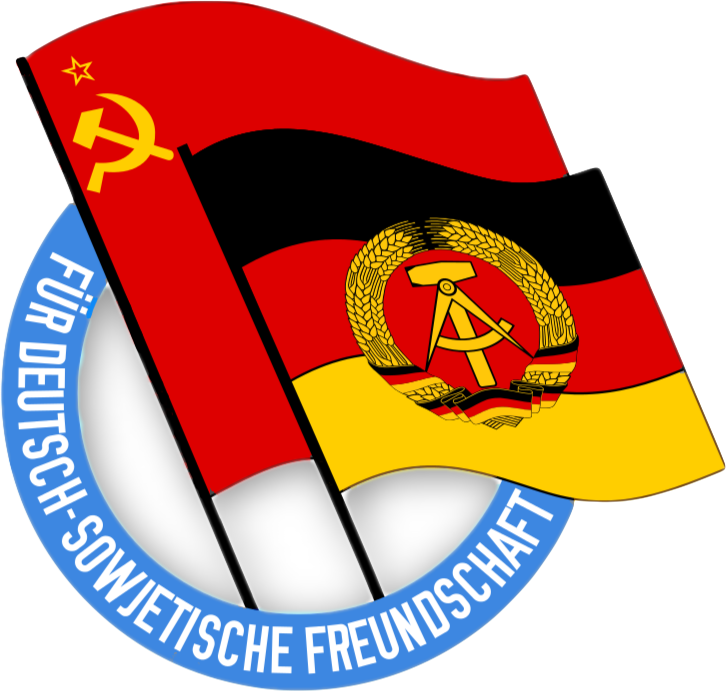

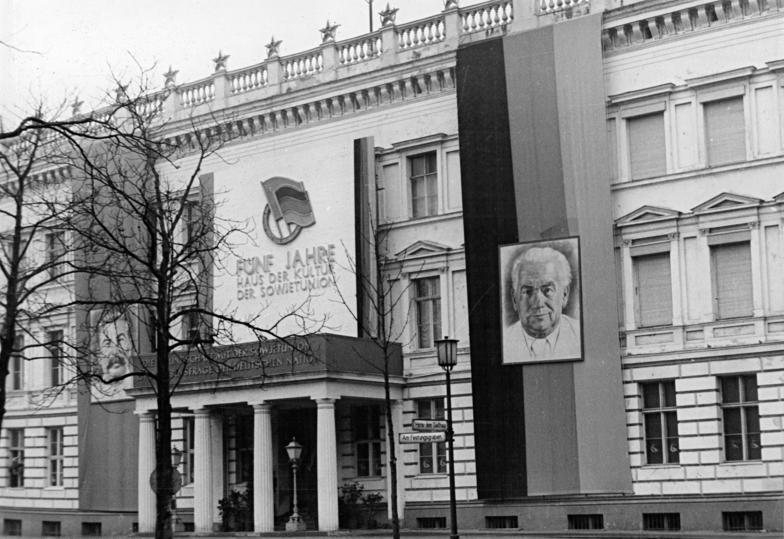
- Berlin headquarters of the DSF's Central Board in 1952
- Abbreviation: DSF
- Predecessor: Society for the Studies of Soviet Culture
- Headquarters: East Berlin, German Democratic Republic
- Members: 6.3 million (1988)

The Society for German–Soviet Friendship (in German, Gesellschaft für Deutsch-Sowjetische Freundschaft/DSF) was an East German organization set up to encourage closer co-operation between the German Democratic Republic and the Union of Soviet Socialist Republics.

It was founded from the Society for the Studies of Soviet Culture to teach about Russian culture to Germans unfamiliar with it. It quickly turned into a propaganda tool and eventually changed its name.

Due to the immense popularity of Mikhail Gorbachev with ordinary East Germans disillusioned with their own hardline Communist leaders, the DSF's membership grew massively in the last years of the regime which many interpret as a sign of support of Gorbachev's glasnost and perestroika by the East German people. In 1989 there were 6.3 million members.

Following the disbanding of the German Democratic Republic, the organization was dissolved.

The name has inspired band names that play on the name of the DSF, for instance the German band Deutsch Amerikanische Freundschaft, which means German-American Friendship, as well as Jewish Ukrainian Freundschaft (J.U.F.).

== See also ==
- Polish–Soviet Friendship Society
- Czechoslovak-Soviet Friendship Society
- Hungarian-Soviet Friendship Society
- Romanian Association for Strengthening Ties with the Soviet Union

== Literature ==
- Matthias Klingenberg: "Culture as vehicle : the history of the German-Soviet Friendship-Society (1947-1953)", Heidelberg 2001.
