= Balkan Beat Box (album) =

Studio album by Balkan Beat Box
- Released: 20 September 2005
- Recorded: Summer 2004
- Genre: World music, electronica, funk, gypsy punk
- Length: 53:50
- Label: Nana Disc
- Producer: Tamir Muskat

Balkan Beat Box chronology
Gogol Bordello vs. Tamir Muskat (2004)	Balkan Beat Box (2005)	Nu Med (2007)

Professional ratings
Review scores
Source	Rating
AllMusic	3.5/5 stars
Robert Christgau	A−

Balkan Beat Box is the self-titled debut album from the Israeli electronica-world fusion trio Balkan Beat Box.

== Track listing ==
No.	Title	Length
1.	"Cha Cha"	4:10
2.	"Bulgarian Chicks" (feat. Vlada Tomova & Kristin Espeland)	5:52
3.	"Adir Adirim" (feat. Victoria Hanna)	5:19
4.	"9/4 The Ladies"	4:03
5.	"Shushan" (feat. Shushan)	4:42
6.	"Ya Man"	3:35
7.	"Gross" (feat. Boom Pam)	3:05
8.	"Sunday Arak" (feat. Dana Leong)	5:07
9.	"Hassan's Mimuna" (feat. Hassan Ben Jaffar)	5:35
10.	"Meboli" (feat. Vlada Tomova)	3:53
11.	"La Bush Resistance" (feat. Tomer Yosef)	4:25
