= Dina Páucar =

Peruvian musician

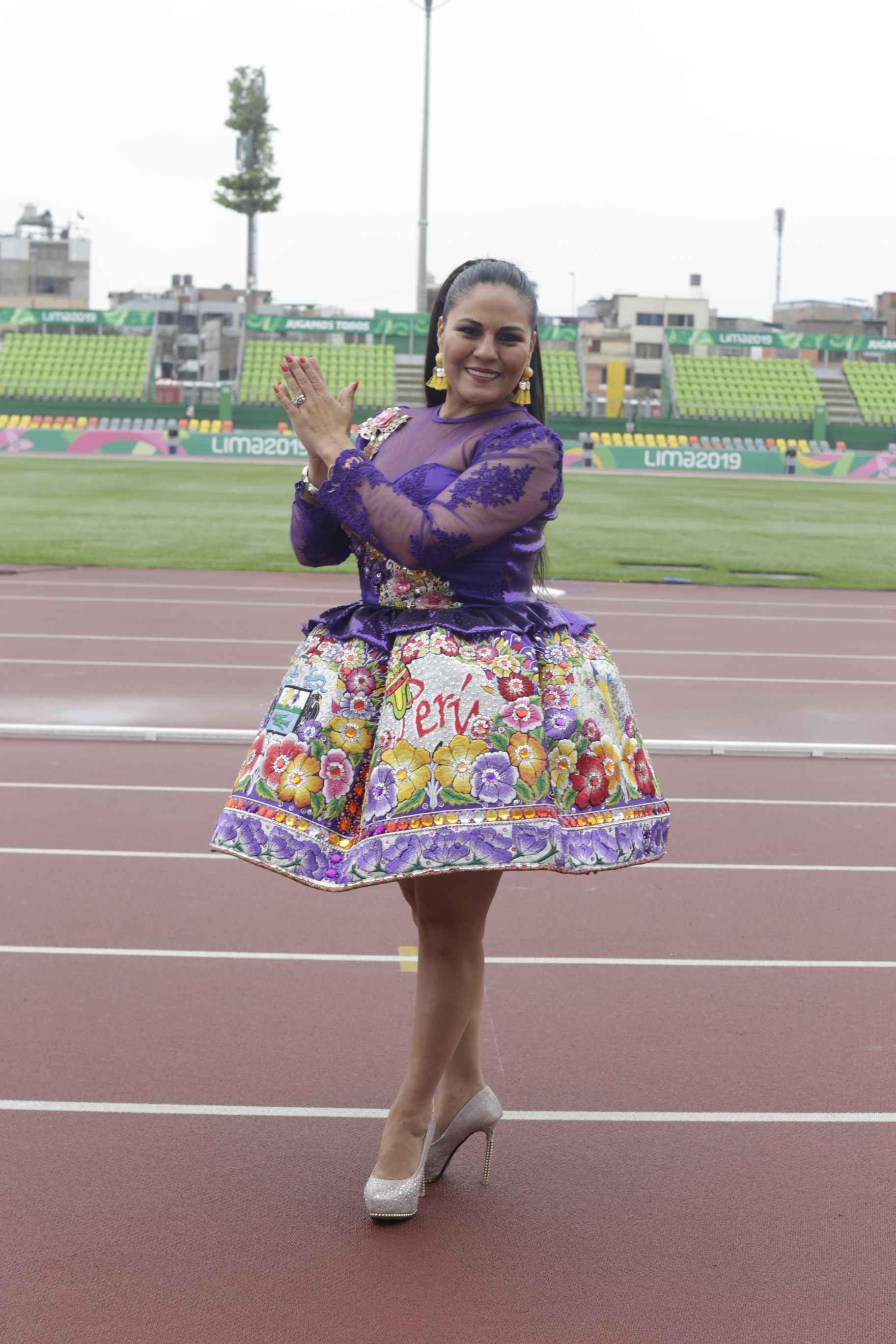
Dina Paucar Reinicia

Dina Páucar (born 1969 in Tingo María, Huánuco, Peru) is a Peruvian Andean music singer and composer.

== Life ==
Paucar was born in Tingo María, Huánuco en 1969. At the age of 10, she left her hometown to Peru's capital, Lima, where she did many lower-paid jobs: street vendor, food vendor, and housemaid. In many opportunities Paucar has said that she faced discrimination for being Andean Quechua-speaking women.

After years of hard work, she was able to open a space within the Huayno music scene. Her musical albums became best-sellers and Paucar become one of the most successful singers and composers of contemporary Andean music. In 2004 Dina Paucar la lucha por un sueño, a TV sitcom inspired in her life and trajectory, was aired.

== Awards and honors ==
In 2008 Paucar was named a Goodwill ambassador by UNICEF. In 2016 she was recognized as a Lima cultural ambassador by Peru's Ministry of Culture.

== Music ==
- Dina Páucar (1994), La voz del amor: Mi tesoro. Prodisar E.I.R. Ltda., Lima. Casete
- La Diosa Hermosa del Amor. Arpa: Elmer Jesús. Danny Producciones, Lima. Disco compacto.
- Reinas del arpa 2003. Sonia Morales, Dina Páucar, Anita Santibáñez, Abencia Meza. Disco mp3 (161 títulos).
