= Sidestepper =

Colombian electro-cumbia band

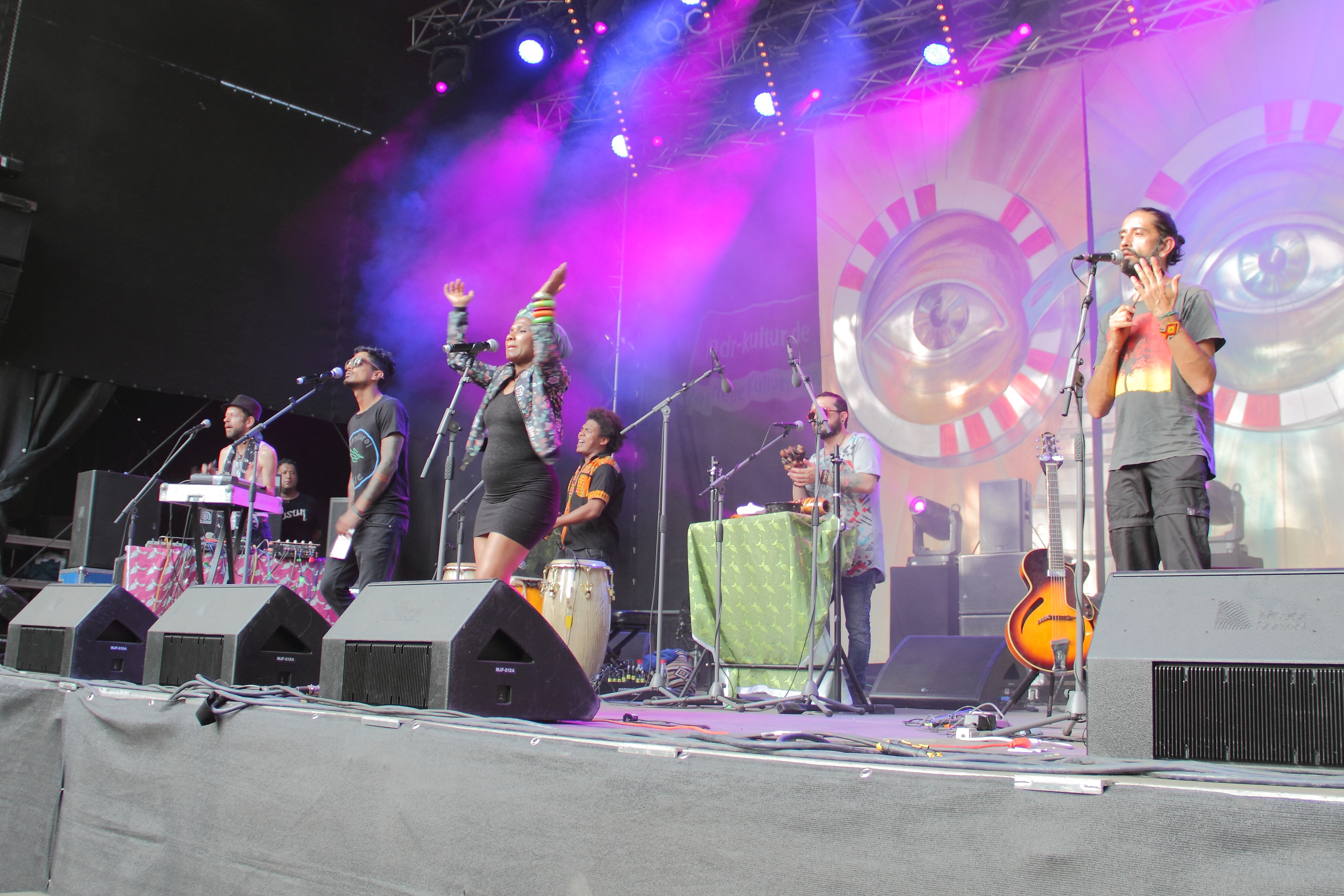
- Rudolstadt-Festival 2016

Background information
- Origin: Bogotá, Colombia
- Genres: World music Drum and bass Tropical; Worldbeat
- Years active: 1996–present
- Labels: Deep South; Palm Pictures; Real World Records
- Members: Richard Blair; Edgardo Garcés; Érika Muñoz; Ernesto "Teto" Ocampo "El Chongo" (aka Juan Carlos Puello)
- Past members: Janio Coronado; Pedro Ojeda
- Website: www.sidestepper.net

Sidestepper is a Colombian band formed in 1996 by English DJ/producer Richard Blair (born 17 June 1965, London). Several of their albums were co-written and co-produced with Colombian singer-songwriter and producer Iván Benavides, including their influential 2003 album 3AM (In Beats We Trust). The group is one of the originators of the Colombian "electro cumbia" sound, influenced both by Afro-Colombian popular music styles like salsa and cumbia as well as electronic dance music such as drum and bass and dub. Over the years Sidestepper has included a number of vocalists and musicians who have since become well-known artists in their own right in Colombia, such as Gloria "Goyo" Martínez of ChocQuibTown, drummer Kike Egurrola (later of Bomba Estéreo), and Humberto Pernett. Since 2000 they have played all over the world, including festivals such as Glastonbury, Coachella, Roskilde and Womad.

== History ==
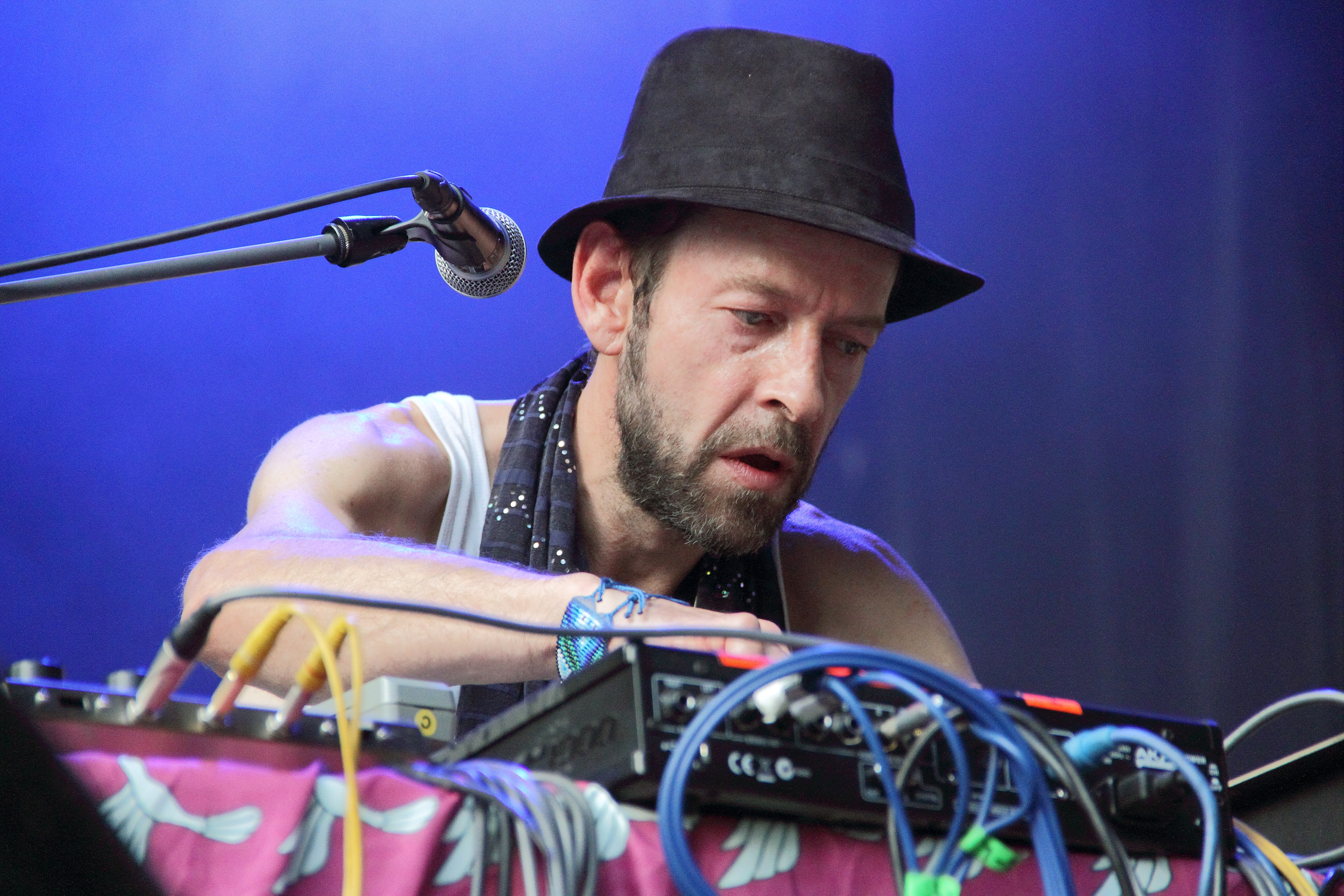
Richard Blair, 2016

The origins of the band can be traced back to 1992 when Richard Blair, then a studio engineer for Peter Gabriel's Real World Records label, found himself working on the album La Candela Viva by Totó la Momposina. Captivated by the mix of Latin and Afro-Caribbean sounds made by Totó and her band, he made the journey to Colombia to visit her and find out more about her music. Originally intending to stay for just a few weeks holiday, Blair ended up staying in Colombia for three years, as he immersed himself in the culture and the music of the country, funding his stay by producing and engineering the early albums by artists who would later go on to be some of Colombia's best known musicians, including Con el Corazon en la Mano by Aterciopelados and La Tierra del Olvido by Carlos Vives. Returning to the UK in 1996, Blair began DJing under the name Sidestepper and recorded the album Southern Star. Released in 1997 on the UK label Deep South, the album was an instrumental mix of salsa and British styles such as drum and bass and dub.

While working on La Tierra del Olvido Blair had met the album's co-producer Iván Benavides, a singer-songwriter who had previously been part of the duo Iván y Lucía. On a visit to Colombia in 1997 Blair played his tracks to Benavides and suggested that they should write some songs together to add vocals to Blair's music. The pair set about putting together a band of the same name, with the intention of playing live versions of the songs they had written. Sidestepper signed to MTM in Colombia and Chris Blackwell's US-based label Palm Pictures worldwide to produce three further albums, More Grip (2000), 3AM (In Beats We Trust) (2003) and Continental (2006), which continued to explore the salsa/drum and bass hybrid sound while incorporating other Colombian rhythms such as cumbia and bullerengue.

Benavides stopped working with the group in 2007 when he moved back to Colombia from New York City to concentrate on setting up his new project "Toda Via" to promote independent Colombian musicians. In an interview with the Colombian newspaper El Tiempo Blair dismissed the notion that Benavides had "left" the band, saying that he had never "joined" the group or been part of the live act, and that the likes of Benavides, Pernett and Martínez were simply part of a fluid collective that changed over time.

In 2008 Palm Pictures released a mix album, The Buena Vibra Sound System, consisting of previously unreleased tracks and remixes of old songs. In 2011 Bogotá-based label Polen released a compilation album titled 15: The Best of 1996–2011, preceded by a new single, "Justicia".

Following the end of their contract with Palm Pictures, the band took a long break and the individual members worked on other musical projects. The group raised money via the crowdfunding website Pledge Music to record a new album, Supernatural Love, in their home studio in Bogotá. It was released to Pledge Music subscribers in March 2015, with a full worldwide release on Real World Records in January 2016. Supernatural Love marked a new musical direction for the band, replacing the electronic sounds with more traditional instruments such as hand drums, shakers, flutes and acoustic instruments.

== Discography ==
=== Albums ===
- Southern Star (Deep South, 1997)
- More Grip (Palm Pictures, 2000)
- 3AM (In Beats We Trust) (Palm Pictures, 2003)
- Continental (Palm Pictures, 2006)
- The Buena Vibra Sound System (mix album) (Palm Pictures, 2008)
- Supernatural Love (Real World Records, 2016)

=== Singles ===
- "Maine"/"Terraplane" (Deep South, 1997)
- "Logozo" (Apartment 22, 1999)
- "Hoy Tenemos" (Palm Pictures, 2000)
- "Linda Manigua" (Palm Pictures, 2001)
- "Más Papaya" (Palm Pictures, 2003)
- "Paloma" (Palm Pictures, 2006)
- "Justicia" (Polen Records, 2011)
- "Come See Us Play" (independent, 2015)

=== Compilations ===
- 15: The Best of 1996–2011 (Polen Records, 2011)
