= Monica Brown (author) =

Peruvian-American academic and author

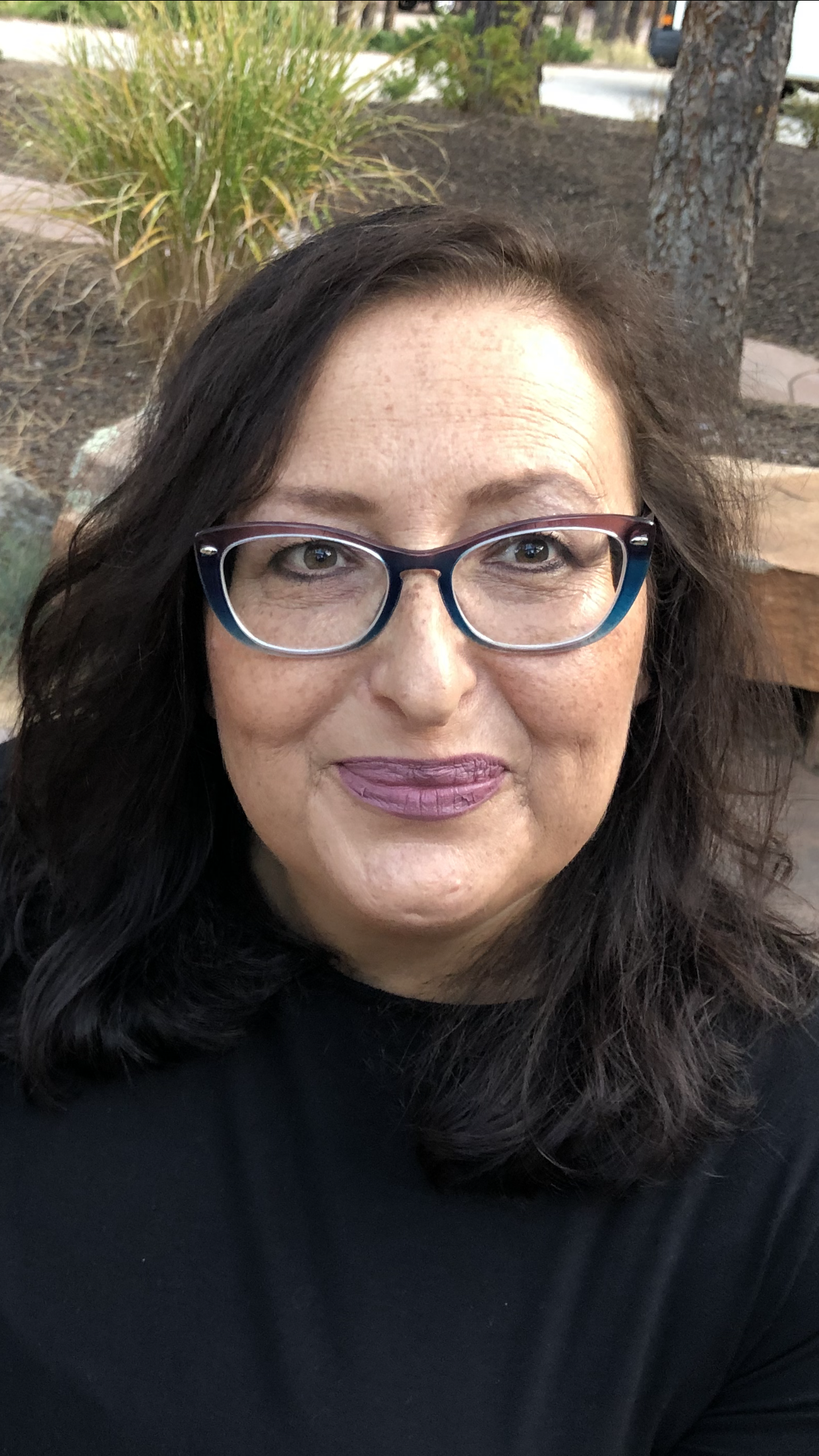
Children's book author Monica Brown

Mónica Brown (born October 24, 1969) is an American academic and author of children's literature. Known for her Lola Levine and Sarai chapter book series, as well as numerous biographies covering such Latin American luminaries as Tito Puente, Celia Cruz, Dolores Huerta, and Cesar Chavez, she writes relatable characters that highlight the nuance and diversity of the Latinx experience and girl empowerment. Her motivation is to show that bicultural children are not made up of cultural fractions but whole people with a rich and vibrant cultural heritage, such as her character the bicultural red-headed Peruvian-Scottish-American Marisol McDonald. Brown is also an English professor at Northern Arizona University.

== Early life ==
Brown was born on October 24, 1969, in Mountain View, California, to Isabel Maria Vexler Valdivieso from Piura, Peru, and Daniel Doronda Brown from San Francisco. Monica is Mestiza and Romanian-Jewish on her mother's side and Hungarian Jewish, Scottish and Italian on her father's side. Brown was raised Catholic and converted to Judaism as an adult. Throughout her childhood, Brown took numerous vacations to visit her mother's family in Peru. Her diverse upbringing influences her work most notably in the character Lola Levine whose Jewish-Peruvian-American ancestry mirrors Brown's.

== Career ==
Brown earned a B.A. in English from the University of California, Santa Barbara, in 1991, an M.A. in English from Boston College in 1994, and a Ph.D. in English from Ohio State University in 1998. She is a tenured professor at Northern Arizona University, where she teaches courses on Chicano, African American, and Multi-ethnic literature. She has been a recipient of a Most Significant Creative or Artistic Achievement Award from Northern Arizona University.

Giving birth to her daughters motivated Brown to begin writing children's books that reflected the significant contributions of the people of the Americas. Brown finds inspiration in her Peruvian and Jewish heritage and a commitment to bring diverse stories to children Brown's books are often published as dual language editions. She has even had one translated into Quechua an indigenous language of the Andes.

Brown published her first children's book, My Name is Celia: the Life of Celia Cruz (Me llamo Celia: la vida de Celia Cruz), published bilingually in English and Spanish in 2004, for which she won the Américas Award for Children's Literature.

In her 2011 book Waiting for the Biblioburro, Brown works to showcase the power of literacy and education by telling the story of a Colombian educator who reaches remote communities in Colombia with a donkey powered library. The book won a Christopher Award in 2012.

Brown's 2012 book Pablo Neruda: Poet of the People won her a second Américas Award for Children's Literature, and in 2015 she won the Judy Goddard Award in Children's Literature. Brown's book Frida Kahlo and her Animalitos was selected by The New York Times as one of the best illustrated books of 2017. In that year, she received a Valle del Sol Award for Latino Excellence In Art, Culture & Literature. Brown has also been a recipient of the Victoria Foundation's Professor Alberto Rios Award and an Outstanding Latino/a in the Literary Arts Award.

In 2018, Brown launched a chapter-book series Sarai, co-authored with child actress and internet sensation Sarai Gonzalez. The series is targeted at children 7-10 and is inspired by events in Sarai's life.

== Bibliography ==
=== Children's Books ===
- My Name Is Celia: The Life of Celia Cruz / Me llamo Celia: la vida de Celia Cruz. Luna Rising, 2004. ISBN 978-0-87358-872-0; Américas Award for Children's Literature
- My Name Is Gabriela: The Life of Gabriela Mistral / Me llamo Gabriela: La vida de Gabriela Mistral. Luna Rising, 2005. ISBN 978-0-87358-859-1; Críticas starred review
- Butterflies on Carmen Street. Piñata Books, 2007. ISBN 978-1-55885-484-0
- My Name Is Gabito: The Life of Gabriel García Márquez / Me llamo Gabito: la vida de Gabriel García Márquez. Cooper Square Publishing, 2007. ISBN 978-0873589086; School Library Journal starred review, Críticas Best Books of 2007, Junior Library Guild Premier Selection
- Pelé, King of Soccer / Pelé, el rey del fútbol. HarperCollins, 2008. ISBN 978-0-06-122781-3; Kirkus starred review
- Side by Side: The Story of Dolores Huerta and Cesar Chavez / Lado a lado, La Historia de Dolores Huerta y César Chávez. HarperCollins, 2010. ISBN 978-0061227813; NAACP Image Award Nominee, Smithsonian Institution's Notable Book for Children
- Chavela and the Magic Bubble. Clarion Books, 2010. ISBN 978-0-547-24197-5; Charlotte Zolotow Award – Commended book
- Waiting for the Biblioburro. Tricycle Press/Random House, 2011. ISBN 978-1-58246-353-7; Christopher Award for Literature for Young People, International Latino Book Awards: Best Children's Fiction Picture Book – Bilingual (second place)
- Clara and the Curandera / Clara y la curandera. Piñata Books, 2011. ISBN 978-1-55885-700-1
- Pablo Neruda, Poet of the People. Henry Holt and Co., 2011. ISBN 978-0-8050-9198-4; Américas Award for Children's Literature, Orbis Pictus Award Honor for Outstanding Nonfiction Honor for Outstanding Nonfiction, Kirkus starred review
- Tito Puente, Mambo King / Tito Puente, Rey del Mambo. HarperCollins, 2013. ISBN 978-0-06-122783-7; American Library Association's Association for Library Service to Children (ALSC) Notable Children's Books, Tejas Star Book Finalist, School Library Journal's “Top 10 Latino-themed Books of 2013, Center for the Study of Multicultural Children’s Literature Best Multicultural Books of 2013
- Conoce a Pablo Picasso. Loqueleo, 2014. ISBN 978-1-61435-344-7
- Girl Power 5-Minute Stories. Houghton Mifflin Harcourt, 2015. ISBN 978-0-544-33925-5
- Maya's Blanket / La Manta de Maya. Children's Book Press/Lee & Low, 2015. ISBN 978-0-89239-235-3
- Frida Kahlo and Her Animalitos. NorthSouth Books, 2017. ISBN 978-0735842694; Pura Belpré Honor for Illustration
- Meet the Joobles / Iconoce a los Jobbles. Fair Indigo, 2020. ISBN 978-1-0983-3902-9
- Sharuko: el arqueólogo Peruano / Peruvian Archaeologist. Children's Book Press/Lee & Low, 2020. ISBN 978-0-89239-423-4; Pura Belpré Honor for Illustration, The Horn Book starred review, School Library Journal starred review, Booklist starred review, Bank Street Silver Medal for best Spanish language book of the year, Blue Bonnet Award Masterlist(Texas Library Association), 2021 Notable Books for a Global Society
- Small Room, Big Dreams: The Journey of Julián and Joaquin Castro. Quill Tree Books, 2021. ISBN 978-0-06-298573-6
- She Persisted: Diana Taurasi. Philomel Books, 2022. ISBN 978-0-593-40294-8
- El Cuarto Turquesa/The Turquoise Room. Lee & Low Books, 2022. ISBN 978-0-892-39435-7; RISE: A Feminist Book Project Booklist recommended book, Premio Campoy-Ada (Premio de Literatura Infantil y Juvenil)
- Doña Fela’s Dream: The Story of San Juan’s First Female Mayor. Little, Brown & Co. 2024 ISBN 978-0-316-17835-8
- She Persisted: Dolores Huerta. Philomel/Penguin, 2024 ISBN 978-1-223-24613-0

The Fantastical Tales of Mari A. Fisch books

- The Fintastical Tales of Mari A. Fisch #1: Mermaid Mission. Hachette Book Group, 2025 ISBN 978-0-063-11627-6
- The Fintastical Tales of Mari A. Fisch #2: Dare to Care. Hachette Book Group, 2025 ISBN 978-0-063-11631-3
- The Fintastical Tales of Mari A. Fisch #3: Pet Peeves. Hachette Book Group, 2025 ISBN 978-0-316-58166-0

Marisol McDonald picture books

- Marisol McDonald Doesn't Match / Marisol McDonald no combina. Children's Book Press/Lee & Low, 2011. ISBN 978-0-89239-235-3; Tejas Star Book Award, American Library Association Notable Book Award, Pura Belpré Honor, International Latino Book Award for Best Bilingual Book, Maryland Black-Eyed Susan Book Award Nominee (picture book), Kirkus starred review, Junior Library Guild Premier Selection
- Marisol McDonald and the Clash Bash / Marisol McDonald y la fiesta sin igual. Children's Book Press/Lee & Low, 2013. ISBN 978-0-89239-273-5; Tejas Star Book Award, International Latino Book Awards: Best Children’s Fiction Book, School Library Journal’s “Top 10 Latino-themed Books of 2013"
- Marisol McDonald and the Monster / Marisol McDonald y El Monstruo. Children's Book Press/Lee & Low, 2016. ISBN 978-0-89239-235-3

Lola Levine series

- Lola Levine Is Not Mean! Little, Brown Books for Young Readers, 2015. ISBN 978-0-316-25836-4
- Lola Levine Drama Queen. Little, Brown Books for Young Readers, 2015. ISBN 978-0-316-25843-2
- Lola Levine and the Ballet Scheme. Little, Brown Books for Young Readers, 2016. ISBN 978-0-316-25844-9
- Lola Levine meets Jelly and Bean. Little, Brown Books for Young Readers, 2017. ISBN 978-0-316-25850-0
- Lola Levine and the Vacation Dream. Brown Books for Young Readers, 2017. ISBN 978-0-316-50638-0
- Lola Levine and the Halloween Scream. Brown Books for Young Readers, 2017. ISBN 978-0-316-50643-4

Sarai series, with Sarai Gonzalez

- Sarai and the Meaning of Awesome. Scholastic, 2018. ISBN 978-1-338-23668-2
- Sarai in the Spotlight. Scholastic, 2018. ISBN 978-0-553-53879-3
- Sarai Saves the Music. Scholastic, 2019. ISBN 978-1-338-26094-6
- Sarai and the Around the World Fair. Scholastic, 2019. ISBN 978-1-338-26095-3

=== Academic Book ===
- Gang Nation: Delinquent Citizens in Puerto Rican, Chicano and Chicana Narratives. University of Minnesota Press, 2002. ISBN 978-0-8166-3478-1
