= Bomba Estéreo =

Colombian band

- Origin: Bogotá, Colombia
- Genres: Electro, cumbia, alternative dance, psychedelic pop
- Years active: 2005–present
- Labels: Nacional Records, Polen Records, FM Discos Y Cintas, Soundway, Sony Music
- Members: Liliana "Li" Saumet; Jaime Alzate; Efrain Cuadrado "Pacho Carnaval"; Jose Castillo; Andrés Zea
- Past members: Simón Mejía; Diego Cadavid; Enrique "Kike" Egurrola; Julián Salazar
- Website: www.bombaestereo.com

Bomba Estéreo is a Colombian band founded in Bogotá in 2005 by Simón Mejía. Their music has been described as "electro tropical" or "psychedelic cumbia".

== History ==
=== 2005–2008: Career beginning and Vol. 1 ===
The origins of the group go back to 2001 when Bogotá native Simón Mejía (previously a member of 1990s Colombian alternative rock band Charconautas) was part of a loose collective of musicians and visual artists under the name A.M. 770. Their music was influenced by Colombian groups such as Sidestepper and Bloque de Busqueda who in the late 1990s had started combining traditional Colombian musical rhythms such as salsa and cumbia with modern electronic beats and dance music. A.M. 770's first musical production was the track "Ritmika" (based on a sample of a song by Venezuelan salsa band Los Blanco) on the album Colombeat, a 2002 compilation showcasing this new musical style which was put together by Colombia's foremost alternative rock band Aterciopelados for their new label Entrecasa.

By 2005, A.M. 770 had effectively become Mejía's solo project and he began to focus more on the musical side of his work, changing the name of the group to Bomba Estéreo. The first results of his new project was the seven-track mini-album Vol. 1 (2006), essentially a solo album but featuring contributions from other artists such as fellow A.M. 770 member Diego Cadavid. Having recorded Vol. 1, Mejía attended the Latin Alternative Music Conference in New York City and was able to secure an international distribution deal with California-based Nacional Records for future releases, with Colombian releases on the Bogotá independent label Polen Records.

One of the vocalists Mejía had used on Vol. 1 was Santa Marta-born singer and rapper Liliana "Li" Saumet, on the track "Huepaje". Saumet had briefly been the singer for the dub reggae band Mister Gomes en Bombay before meeting Mejía at a concert. Impressed with Saumet's contribution, Mejía began to collaborate with her and Cadavid on songs for the next Bomba Estéreo album.

=== 2008–2011: Estalla ===
By the time the second album Estalla was released in 2008, Bomba Estéreo had developed into a full band, with Saumet on vocals, Cadavid on percussion, Julián Salazar on guitar, and former Sidestepper collaborator Enrique "Kike" Egurrola on drums, alongside Mejía on bass and keyboard programming. Estalla was released the following year in the US under the new title Blow Up, with the single "Fuego" helping to attract new fans outside Colombia and resulting in the group being voted "Best New Band in the World" for 2010 by viewers of MTV Iggy, the television channel's outlet for alternative world music artists.

In 2010 the band were one of a dozen artists commissioned by Levi's to cover songs from previous decades, as part of "Levi's Pioneer Sessions" marketing campaign. The group chose to record Technotronic's "Pump Up the Jam", cited by Mejía as his favourite party record. The song was later released under the new title "Ponte Bomb" as the lead track on an EP of the same name, which also featured various remixes of the tracks "Fuego" and "La Boquilla" from Estalla/Blow Up.

The song "Fuego" can be heard in the background of the 2010 episode "Circle Us" on the Showtime television series Dexter, during a scene outside of a club, and later appeared on the series' soundtrack album. "Fuego" has also been used as the theme song of the Argentine television drama series El Puntero which aired in 2011, and features on the soundtrack of EA Sports video game, FIFA 10. The Dixone Remix of the song "La Boquilla" (from the band's 2011 EP Ponte Bomb) was featured on the soundtrack of the movie Limitless that same year. In 2021, "Fuego" was featured in the action video game Far Cry 6 from Ubisoft and can be heard readily at the base-camp of the faction 'Maximas Matanzaz'.

Simón Mejía was selected as one of the three finalists for the 2010–11 Rolex Mentor and Protégé Arts Initiative to spend a year working with Brian Eno, eventually losing out to Australian composer Ben Frost. He also travelled with London-based filmmaker Santiago Posada to the Colombian town of San Basilio de Palenque, where the two men spent three months in 2011 recording the music of the local Afro-Colombian community for a music and DVD box set – the town became known in the 17th century as the site of the first free slave community in all of the Americas, and has retained much of its African-originated language, culture and music.

=== 2011–present: Elegancia Tropical and Amanecer ===
Bomba Estéreo performed at the South by Southwest and Roskilde festivals in 2009, and in 2010 undertook a world tour that visited 32 cities as well as the Bumbershoot festival and Bonnaroo Music Festival. In 2011 they performed at the Coachella Festival and Austin City Limits Music Festival in the US, as well as Lollapalooza Chile and the Vive Latino festival in Mexico City, one of the major worldwide festivals for "rock en español".

The band's third album, Elegancia Tropical, was released in 2012 on Polen Records in Colombia and on Soundway Records worldwide. The album was engineered and mixed by producer Joel Hamilton. To promote the record the band undertook a tour of Colombia, followed by Mexico and the US throughout 2012 and 2013. Band members have said they miss suero while on tour away from Colombia. Their fourth album, Amanecer, was released on June 2, 2015, on Sony Music. One song, "Soy Yo", was selected for the soundtrack of FIFA 16. The music video for "Soy Yo", released in September 2016, featured the debut of Sarai Gonzalez as a nerdy-looking Latina girl with a spunky personality standing up to bullies on the "mean streets" of Brooklyn, New York. The video received over 6.5 million views as of early November 2016. "Soy Yo" was also featured in the soundtrack to the 2017 feature film Pitch Perfect 3 and the 2019 feature film Dora and the Lost City of Gold. "Soy Yo" also appeared in the 2019 dance rhythm game, Just Dance 2020 and in the GrubHub advert "Delivery Dance", which gained traction as an Internet meme for its inhuman dancing. "Carnavalera" and "Playa Grande" were featured on the Need for Speed Heat soundtrack.

The album Amanecer was placed 50th in Rolling Stone's list of the 50 best albums of 2015. In late 2016, the band went on a 12-city tour, featuring multiple US cities featuring music from their latest album. The group headlined the FM Festival in Miami, Florida in January 2017. In August 2017, guitarist Julian Salazar confirmed in an interview with POUSTA.com that he and the group had parted ways.

In 2019, their song "Internacionales" was used in a TV ad aired in the United States for the Walmart Grocery App. In 2019, their song "Caderas" was featured as the diegetic soundtrack to the opening police-siege scenes of the American action-adventure film Triple Frontier. Also in 2021, their song "Soy Yo" (from the Amanecer album) was used for a Grubhub TV commercial aired in the United States in various forms. In 2022, the band collaborated with Puerto Rican singer Bad Bunny on the song "Ojitos Lindos", from his fourth studio album Un Verano Sin Ti; the song became one of the most popular tracks from the album, with over 1 billion streams on Spotify as of April 2023.

== Members ==
Current members

- Liliana "Li" Saumet – vocals (2005–present)
- Efrain "Pacho Carnaval" Cuadrado – guitar, synthesizers (2005–present)
- Andrés Zea – guitar, synthesizers (2017–present)
- Jose Castillo – guitar, synthesizers, percussion (2005–present)
- Jaime Alzate – drums (2015–present)

Former members

- Simón Mejía – bass, synthesizers (2005–2022)
- Diego Cadavid – drums, percussion (2005–2010)
- Enrique "Kike" Egurrola - drums, percussion (2007–2015)
- Julián Salazar - guitar, synthesizers (2007–2017)

== Discography ==
=== Studio albums ===
| Title | Album details |
|---|---|
| Volumen 1 | Released: 2006; Label: Polen; Format: Digital download |
| Estalla / Blow Up | Released: 2008/2009; Label: Polen; Format: Digital download |
| Elegancia tropical | Released: 2012; Label: Polen / Soundway; Format: Digital download |
| Amanecer | Released: 2015; Label: Sony Music; Format: Digital download, streaming |
| Ayo | Released: 2017; Label: Sony Music; Format: Digital download, streaming |
| Deja | Released: 2021; Label: Sony Music; Format: Digital download, streaming |

=== EPs ===
| Title | EP details |
|---|---|
| Ponte Bomb | Released: 2011; Label: Nacional; Format: Digital download |

=== Live albums ===
| Title | Album details |
|---|---|
| Live in Dublin | Released: 2019; Label: Nacional; Format: Digital download |

=== Singles ===
| Title | Year | Album |
|---|---|---|
| "Fuego" | 2009 | Estalla/Blow Up |
| "El Alma y el Cuerpo" | 2012 | Elegancia Tropical |
| "Pure Love" | 2013 | Elegancia Tropical |
| "Qué Bonito" | 2014 | Non-album single |
| "Algo Está Cambiando" | 2015 | Amanecer |
| "Playa Grande" (with Sofi Tukker) | 2019 | Dancing on the People |
| "Romántica Champeta" (with Kevin Flórez) | 2023 | Non-album single |
| "Corazón" (with Nelly Furtado) | 2024 | 7 |

=== Music videos ===
- "Nieve en Cali" (2006)
- "Huepajé" (2007)
- "Corinto" (2007)
- "Caminito" (2008)
- "Fuego" (2009)
- "Agua salá" (2010)
- "La Boquilla" (2010)
- "Ponte Bomb" (2011)
- "La cumbia sicodélica" (2011)
- "El alma y el cuerpo" (2012)
- "Caribbean Power" (2013)
- "Pure Love" (2013)
- "Bosque" (2014)
- "Que Bonito" (2014)
- "Fiesta" (2015)
- "Somos dos" (2015)
- "Soy Yo" (2016)
- "Duele" (2017)
- "Internacionales" (2017)
- "Química" (2017)
- "Amar Así" (2018)
- "To My Love" (Tainy Remix) (2015–16; 2018)
- "Agua" (2021)
- "Deja" (2021)
- ″Keagan″ (2024)

== Awards and nominations ==
=== Latin Grammy Awards ===
A Latin Grammy Award is an accolade by the Latin Academy of Recording Arts & Sciences to recognize outstanding achievement in the music industry. They have received eleven nominations.

| Year | Category | Nominated work | Result | Ref. |
|---|---|---|---|---|
| 2013 | Best Alternative Music Album | Elegancia Tropical | Nominated | |
| 2015 | Best Alternative Music Album | Amanecer | Nominated | |
| 2015 | Record of the Year | "Fiesta" | Nominated | |
| 2017 | Best Short Form Music Video | "Soy Yo" | Nominated | |
| 2018 | Record of the Year | "Internacionales" | Nominated | |
| 2018 | Best Urban Fusion/Performance | "Internacionales" | Nominated | |
| 2018 | Best Short Form Music Video | "Duele" | Nominated | |
| 2022 | Album of the Year | Deja | Nominated | |
| 2022 | Best Alternative Music Album | Deja | Nominated | |
| 2022 | Record of the Year | "Ojitos Lindos" (with Bad Bunny) | Nominated | |
| 2022 | Best Alternative Song | "Conexión Total" (with Yemi Alade) | Nominated | |

Note: At the 23rd Annual Latin Grammy Awards, both Liliana Saumet and Simón Mejía received a second nomination for Album of the Year, the former as a songwriter in Bad Bunny's Un Verano Sin Ti and the latter as a producer in Fonseca's Viajante.

=== Grammy Awards ===
A Grammy Award is an accolade by the National Academy of Recording Arts and Sciences to recognize outstanding achievement in the music industry. They have received four nominations.

| Year | Category | Nominated work | Result | Ref. |
|---|---|---|---|---|
| 2016 | Best Latin Rock, Urban or Alternative Album | Amanecer | Nominated | |
| 2018 | Best Latin Rock, Urban or Alternative Album | Ayo | Nominated | |
| 2022 | Best Latin Rock, Urban or Alternative Album | Deja | Nominated | |
| 2023 | Album of the Year | Un Verano Sin Ti (as featured artists) | Nominated | |

=== Premios Nuestra Tierra ===
A Premio Nuestra Tierra is an accolade that recognizes outstanding achievement in the Colombian music industry. Bomba Estéreo have received three nominations.

| Year | Category | Nominated work | Result | Ref. |
|---|---|---|---|---|
| 2014 | Best Alternative Artist | Themselves | Nominated | |
| 2014 | Best Alternative Performance | "Pure Love" | Nominated | |
| 2014 | Best Music Video | "Pure Love" | Nominated | |

- Won: (2013) Revista Shock Award for Best Group "Pura Sabrosura" for Elegancia Tropical
- Won: (2012) iTunes Award for Best New Artist for Elegancia Tropical
- Won: (2010) MTV Iggy Award for Best New Band in the World for Estalla / Blow Up
