= Balkan Beat Box =

Israeli musical group

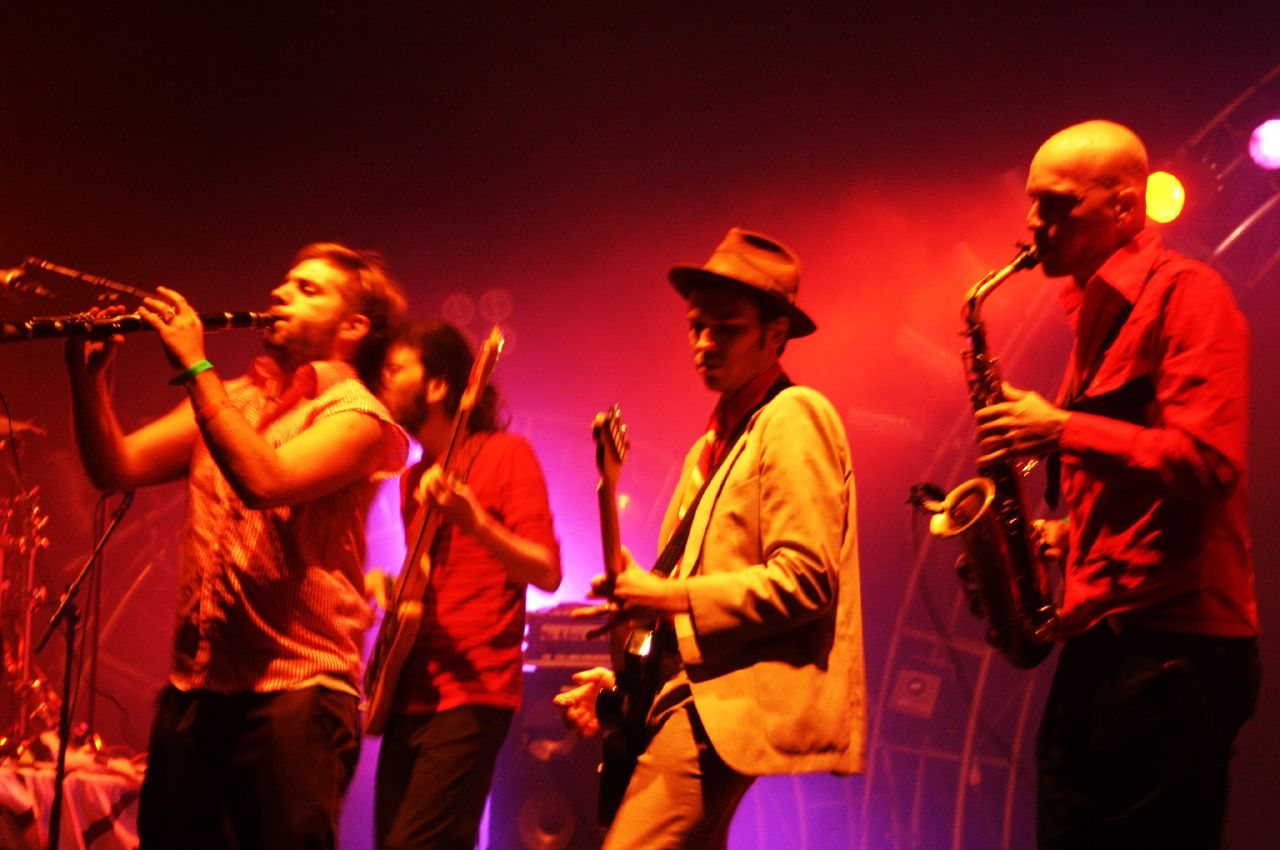

Background information
- Origin: Tel Aviv, Israel; New York City, U.S.
- Genres: Gypsy punk, electronica, funk, reggae, world music
- Years active: 2003–present
- Labels: Crammed Discs, Nat Geo Music, JDub Records, NMC Music
- Spinoff of: Firewater
- Members: Ori Kaplan; Tamir Muskat; Tomer Yosef
- Website: www.balkanbeatbox.com

Balkan Beat Box (BBB) is an Israeli musical group. Founded by Tamir Muskat and Ori Kaplan in 2003, BBB was later joined by Tomer Yosef who became a core member. The group plays Mediterranean-influenced music that incorporates Jewish, Southeast Europe (mainly Balkan) and Middle Eastern music, Gypsy punk, reggae and electronica. As a musical unit they often collaborate with a host of other musicians both in the studio as well as live.

== History ==
Co-founders Ori Kaplan and Firewater's member Tamir Muskat both met in Brooklyn, New York, NY as teenagers. Both had grown up with music; Kaplan had been a klezmer clarinetist, while Muskat was a drummer in a punk rock band. They established their own unique sound by fusing the musical styles of Mediterranean and Balkan traditions (mainly helped by Teo and the Chalga masters at the time) with hip hop and dancehall beats.

Balkan Beat Box’s goal was to take ancient and traditional musical traditions and fuse those with hip hop in order to create a new mix of musical styles out of the traditional world music context that would appeal to listeners in a club or a dancehall. As children, they had felt that traditional music was outdated and felt as though it did not adequately reflect their experiences of the growing world culture, so hoped to bring new relevance to these old traditional musical forms. They cite Boban Marković, Rachid Taha, Fanfare Ciocarlia, Manu Chao, and Charlie Parker amongst their musical influences. The group was also influenced by Jamaican dub. In December 2006, the acclaimed artist from Tel Aviv Tomer Yosef became frontman for the group.

Balkan Beat Box’s self-titled first album (released in 2005) and their 2007 follow-up album Nu Med both received global acclaim. While their first album focused more on Mediterranean sounds, their second album included Arabic and Spanish influences. The song "Bulgarian Chicks" from their first album became popular in clubs and dancehalls in 2008.

The group released Blue Eyed Black Boy in 2010 and Give in 2012. Regarded as the "godfathers of global bass" by MTV Iggy, the band continued to expand their sound incorporating electronic dance music, reggae, cumbia, and brass bands into their tracks. Blue Eyed Black Boy was recorded in Romania with the Jovica Ajderevic Orkestar brass band, and at Vibromonk East in Tel Aviv. Key tracks are "Dancing with the Moon", "Move It", "Blue Eyed Black Boy", and "War Again" as harbinger of things to come. The album Give was influenced by the Arab Spring, Occupy movements, and the spirit of change around the world. Spin Magazine dubbed the band "a global peace-keeping mission you can dance to".

== Samplings and adaptations ==
The band's song "Bulgarian Chicks" was sampled by Mac Miller in the Diplo-produced track "Goosebumpz". Later "Bulgarian Chicks" was also sampled in "Sis: Trompeta".

The album Nu Med, already famous internationally became more popular when in August 2013 the song "Hermetico" taken from the album was sampled by Jason Derulo in his international hit "Talk Dirty" featuring 2 Chainz.

In 2014, the Norwegian comedy duo Ylvis sampled the song "Adir Adirim" from Balkan Beat Box's eponymous album for the track "Mr. Toot". This track debuted as part of the fourth season of their show I kveld med YLVIS.

== Appearances in media ==
Their song featured in EA Sports' FIFA game series twice such as "Ramallah-Tel Aviv" featuring Tomer Yosef and Saz from album Nu Made (Remixes) in FIFA 10 and "I Trusted You" from album Shout it Out in FIFA 17.

"9/4 the Ladies" was featured in the 2008 film You Don't Mess with the Zohan.

"Hermetico" and "Balcasio" were featured in a 2009 episode of the TV series Bored to Death.

"Marcha de la Vida" was featured in Konami's Pro Evolution Soccer 2011

They contributed an original song with production duo Stargate for the 2015 film Home, entitled "Slushious".

The David Sisko remix of "Headhunter" was featured in the 2016 film Kindergarten Cop 2.

They co-produced and co-wrote a song for The Lonely Island featured on the Popstar: Never Stop Never Stopping soundtrack, entitled "2 Banditos".

"War again" was featured as closing music during broadcasts of the korean e-sports league GSL.

"Shushan" was featured in the end credits for the 2016 horror film Jeruzalem.

== Band members ==
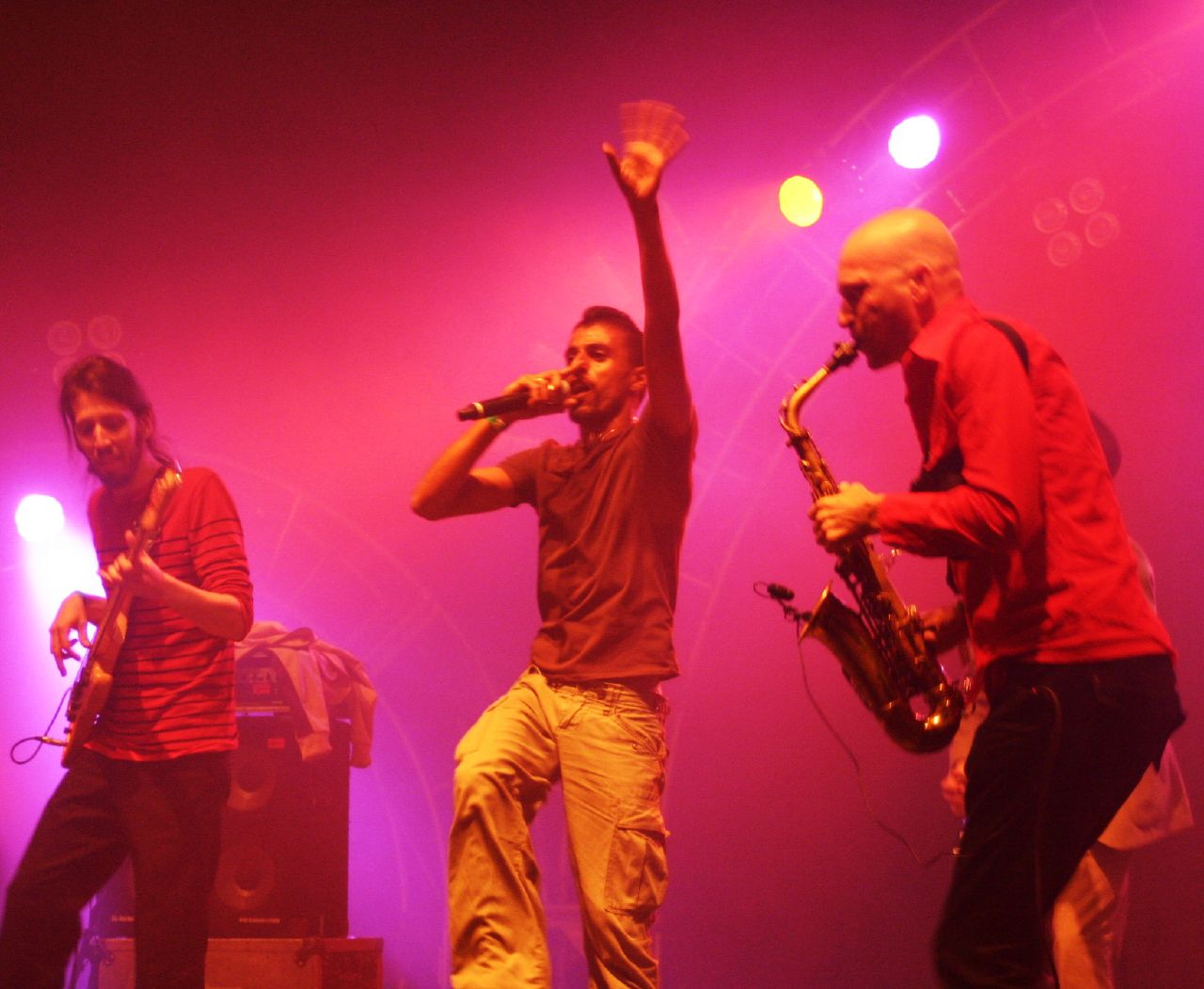
Balkan Beat Box in concert

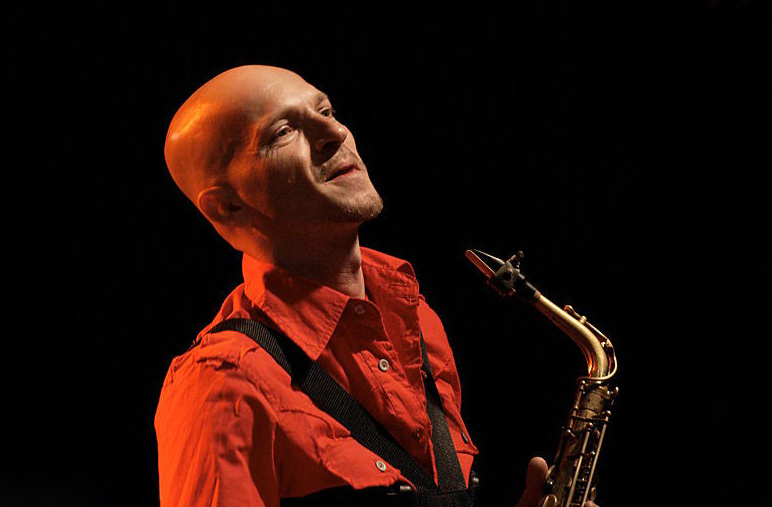
Ori Kaplan

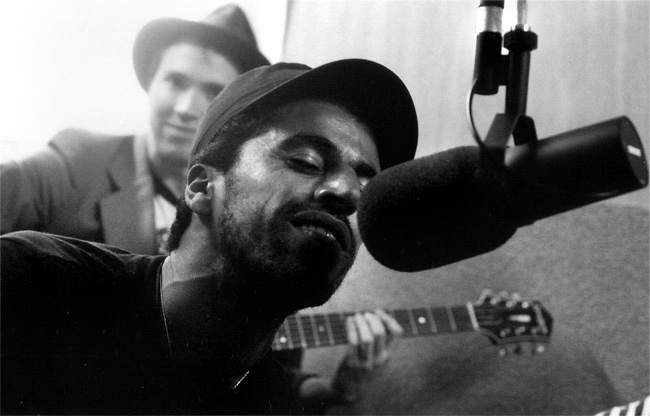
Balkan Beat Box performing at the 2006 Bonnaroo Music Festival in Manchester, TN

Official members

- Tomer Yosef - lead vocals, percussion, samples
- Ori Kaplan - saxophone
- Tamir Muskat - drums, percussion, programming

Current live performers

- Itamar Ziegler - guitar, bass guitar
- Ben Hendler - bass guitar
- Ron Bunker - guitar
- Peter Hess - saxophone
- Eyal Talmudi - saxophone
- Uri Brauner Kinrot - guitar, saxophone
- Alon Grinberg - Accordion

Past live performers

- Jeremiah Lockwood - guitar
- Dana Leong - trombone

== Discography ==
- Balkan Beat Box (2005) - released on JDub Records
- Nu Med (2007) - released on JDub Records, Crammed Discs
- Nu Made (Remixes) (2008) - released on JDub Records, Crammed Discs
- Blue Eyed Black Boy (2010) - released on Nat Geo Music and Crammed Discs
- Give (2012) - released on Nat Geo Music and Crammed Discs
- Shout It Out (2016) - released on NMC Music
- Wild Wonder (2024) - released on NMC Music
