= Sarai Gonzalez =

American child actress and author

- Born: Sarai Isaura Gonzalez; 2005 (age 20–21)
- Occupations: Actress, author
- Years active: 2016–present
- Known for: "Soy Yo" music video

Sarai Isaura Gonzalez (born 2005) is an American Latina child actress and writer. She made her professional acting debut at the age of 11 on the Spanish-language "Soy Yo" ("That's Me") music video by Bomba Estéreo. Cast as a "nerdy" tween with a "sassy" and "confident" attitude, her performance turned her into a "Latina icon" for "female empowerment, identity and self-worth". She subsequently appeared in two get out the vote videos for Latinos in advance of the 2016 United States elections. In 2018 she co-authored several volumes in a semiautobiographical chapter book series for children aged 7 to 10.

== Early life and family ==
Sarai Isaura Gonzalez is the eldest of three daughters of Juan Carlos Gonzalez, a native of Naranjo de Alajuela, Costa Rica, and his wife Diana, originally from Peru. Her parents immigrated to the United States when they were children and later met in church. The family resides in Green Brook, New Jersey. Juan Carlos formerly worked as a construction engineer before leaving his job to care for the children; Diana is a computer analyst in a hospital in Newark.

== Career ==
=== 2015–2016 ===
From an early age, Sarai enjoyed singing, dancing, and performing. In 2015 her parents signed her up for a talent and modeling program run by Actors, Models and Talent for Christ, and she was signed by a New York agent. In 2016 she auditioned for the lead role in the Spanish-language "Soy Yo" music video and was selected from a pool of more than 100 applicants. Cast as a "nerdy" tween with a "sassy" and "confident" attitude, she traverses the "mean streets" of Brooklyn, facing up to taunts and bullies. The music video, released on September 7, 2016, garnered over one million views upon its September 2016 release and logged over 6.5 million views as of early November. Gonzalez was viewed as a "Latina icon" for "female empowerment, identity and self-worth". The New York Times opined:

'Soy Yo' seemed to appear at precisely the right moment—a defiant, and adorable, rebuke to the anti-Latino rhetoric of the Trump campaign, and haters in general. "Don't worry if they don't accept you," goes the song's chorus, in Spanish. "If they criticize you, just say, 'That's me.'"

Gonzalez' character inspired fans to post artwork, memes, and childhood photos of themselves on social media under the hashtag #SoyYo. In October, Fusion released a video of Gonzalez giving advice on how to develop self-confidence.

Gonzalez appeared in her first speaking role in a 30-second Latino get out the vote video produced by Civic Innovation Works in advance of the 2016 US elections. She also appeared in the two-minute "Be You y Vota" video produced by People for the American Way, in which she encourages her father and neighbors to cast their ballots and dances as she leads them to the polling station.

Gonzalez was a guest at the Hispanic Heritage reception at the White House on October 12, 2016, where she shared a hug with President Barack Obama.

=== 2017 ===
Gonzalez was cast in the lead role in Watermelon (2017), a New York University thesis short film written and directed by Toryn Seabrooks. Gonzalez played a "12 year old frumpy wallflower" who wants to join a cheerleaders squad.

=== 2018 ===
The first volume of a multi-part chapter book series, co-authored by Gonzalez and Monica Brown and published by Scholastic, was released in September 2018. Titled Sarai and the Meaning of Awesome, the series is based on events in Gonzalez' life and is aimed at readers aged 7 to 10. Scholastic has since released volume 2, Sarai in the Spotlight, and volume 3, Sarai Saves the Music. Each volume is available in English and Spanish editions.
