= Tomer Yosef =

Israeli singer (born 1975)

Tomer Yosef תומר יוסף
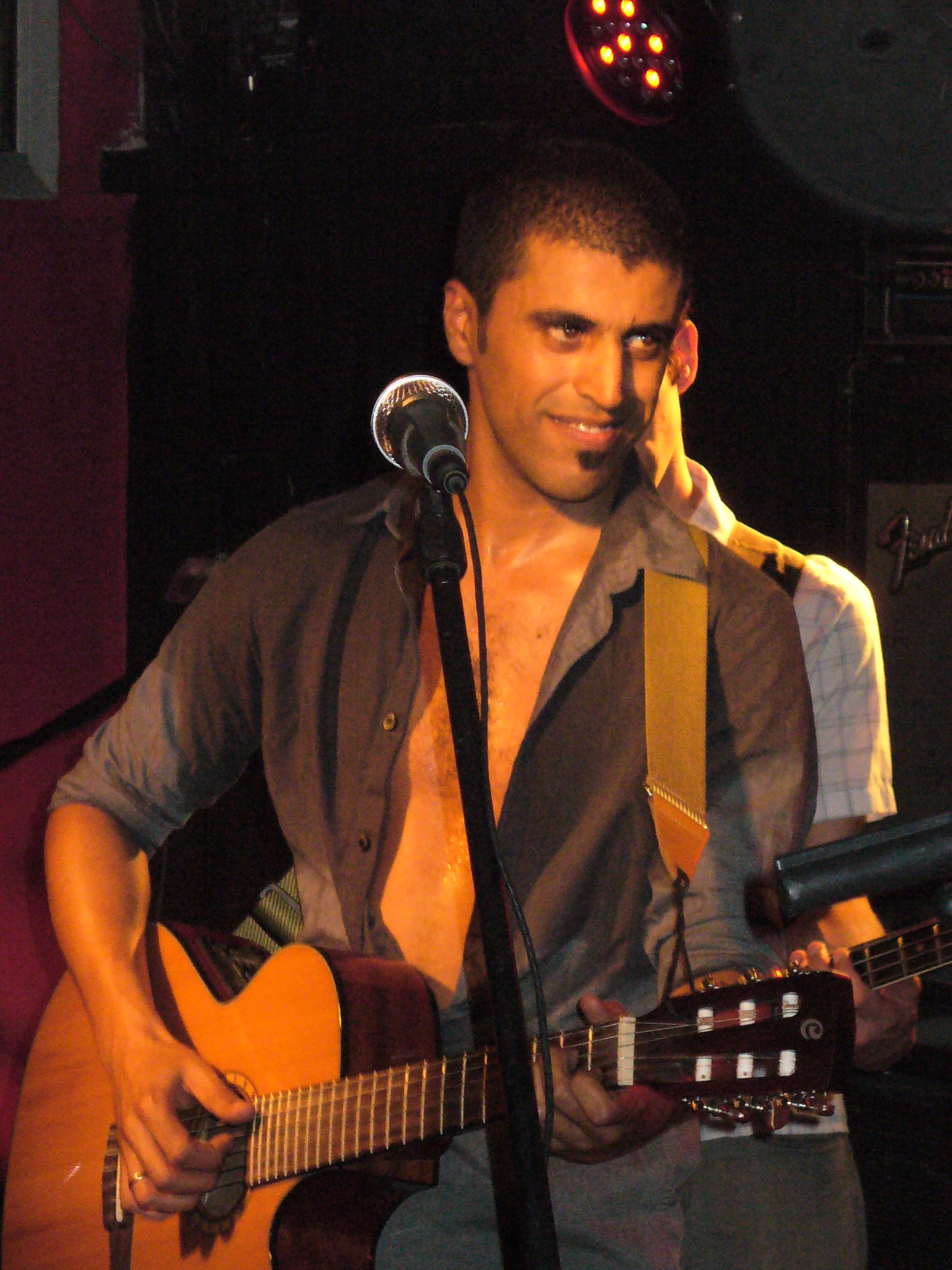

Background information
- Also known as: Ola
- Born: 8 September 1975 (age 50); Kfar Saba, Israel
- Genres: rock, world music
- Occupations: Singer, songwriter, producer, tv and film actor, comedian
- Instrument: Vocals guitar
- Years active: 1994–present
- Member of: Balkan Beat Box

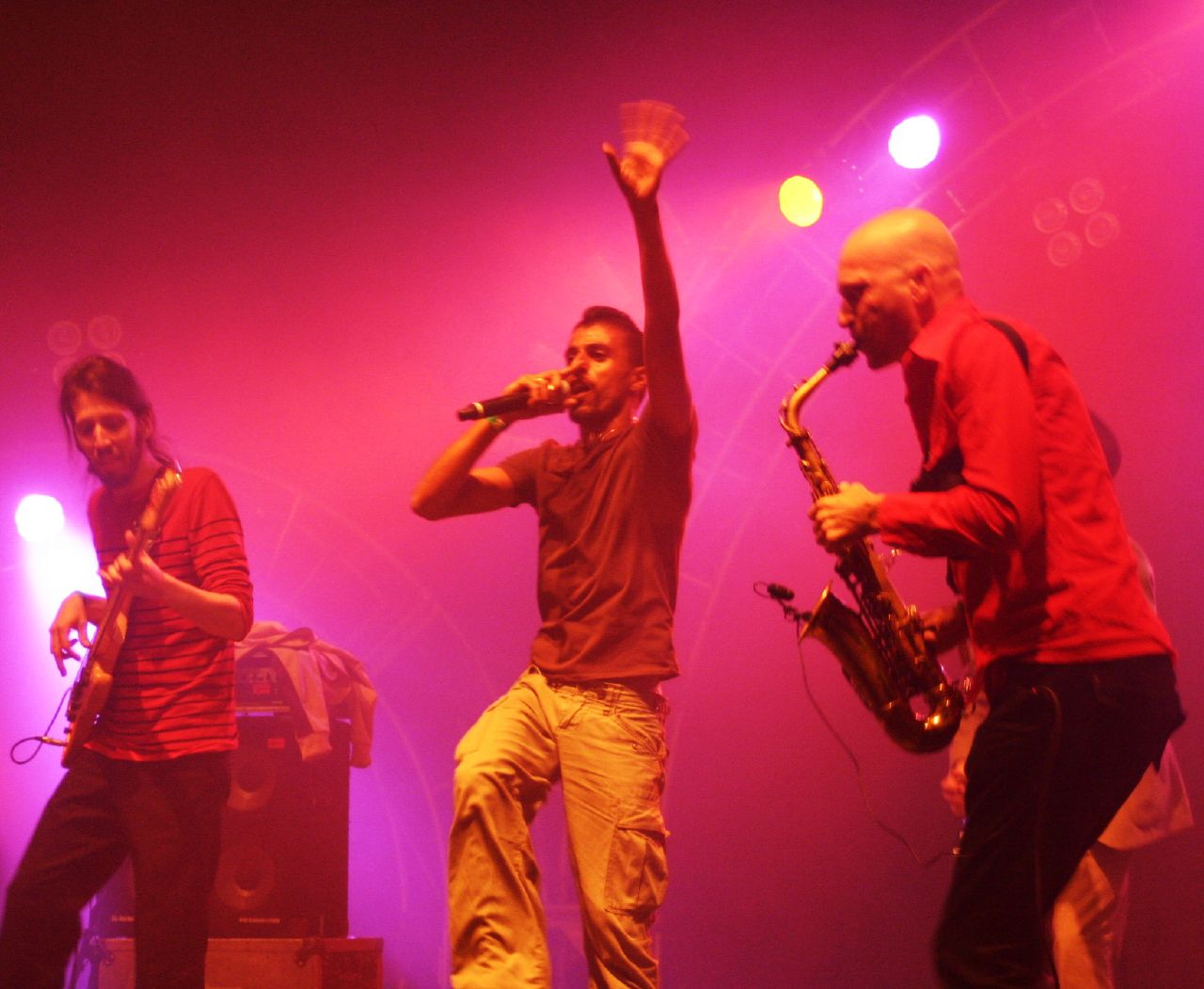
Tomer Yosef (middle) performing with Balkan Beat Box

Tomer Yosef (Hebrew: תומר יוסף; born in Kfar Saba, Israel on 8 September 1975) is an Israeli singer and lead vocalist for the Israeli electronica-world fusion band Balkan Beat Box. The band founded by Tamir Muskat, Ori Kaplan included Tomer Yosef as a core member of the formation and its lead singer.

Yosef started his career as a stand-up comedian in 1994, appearing frequently on Israeli radio and television and played roles in a few Israeli television series, writing and directing the TV series Platfus himself. and appearing in 1998 in series הצל של החיוך שלך (Ha-Tzel, Shel Hachiuch Shelchah) and in the film ביקור התזמורת (in English, The Band's Visit)

He then moved to New York City in 1998 working with Itamar Ziegler in Zion Train. In 2001, he participated in the TV show כוכבי השכונה (Kochvey Hashchuna meaning Stars of the Neighborhood) as a band drummer. In 2002 he cooperated with Tamir Muskat to produce his first album, תגידו משהו (meaning Say Something). He worked as an electronic artist, and written, composed, and produced with Muskat. In 2004 he started a DJ set and performed all over Israel, before joining Balkan Beat Box as a guest singer on their 2005 debut album also called Balkan Beat Box. He also continued as a main vocal performer in their live shows. Yosef released his second album צוחקים מתחת לאדמה (in English: Laughing Underground) in 2006 mostly influenced by reggae, dancehall and pop rock, and in 2009 his third album הטרמפולינה עם בן with Balkan Beat Box musician Ben Handler and השחר 35 in 2011. In 2013, together with Itamar Ziegler, Gedi Ronen, and the poet Yankaleh Rotblit, he founded the band "HaHatzer HaAkhorit" (החצר האחורית "The Backyard"), which performs songs written by Rotblit. The band has released three albums.

== Personal life ==
Yosef is of Yemenite Jewish descent. Yosef is married to Noa Kabia, and as of 2011, they have two children.

== Discography ==
(for his discography with Balkan Beat Box, refer to that article's discography section)

=== Albums ===
- 2002: תגידו משהו (Say Something)
- 2006: צוחקים מתחת לאדמה (Laughing Underground)
- 2009: הטרמפולינה עם בן
- 2011: השחר 35
- 2019: SPARKLE by Maya Isacowitz (producer)
- 2020: כמה נורמלי

== Filmography ==
Television

- 1994: Platfus (TV series co-director, co-writer, acting role)
- 1998: הצל של החיוך שלך (Ha-Tzel, Shel Hachiuch Shelchah) as Auto Glida
- 2001: כוכבי השכונה (Kochvey Hashchuna) as Ovadia (TV series)
- 2002: Chunt Lee (TV series)

Films

- 2007: Bikur Ha-Tizmoret (The Band's Visit) as Ars
