= Tamir Muskat =

Israeli musician

Tamir Muskat תמיר מוסקט
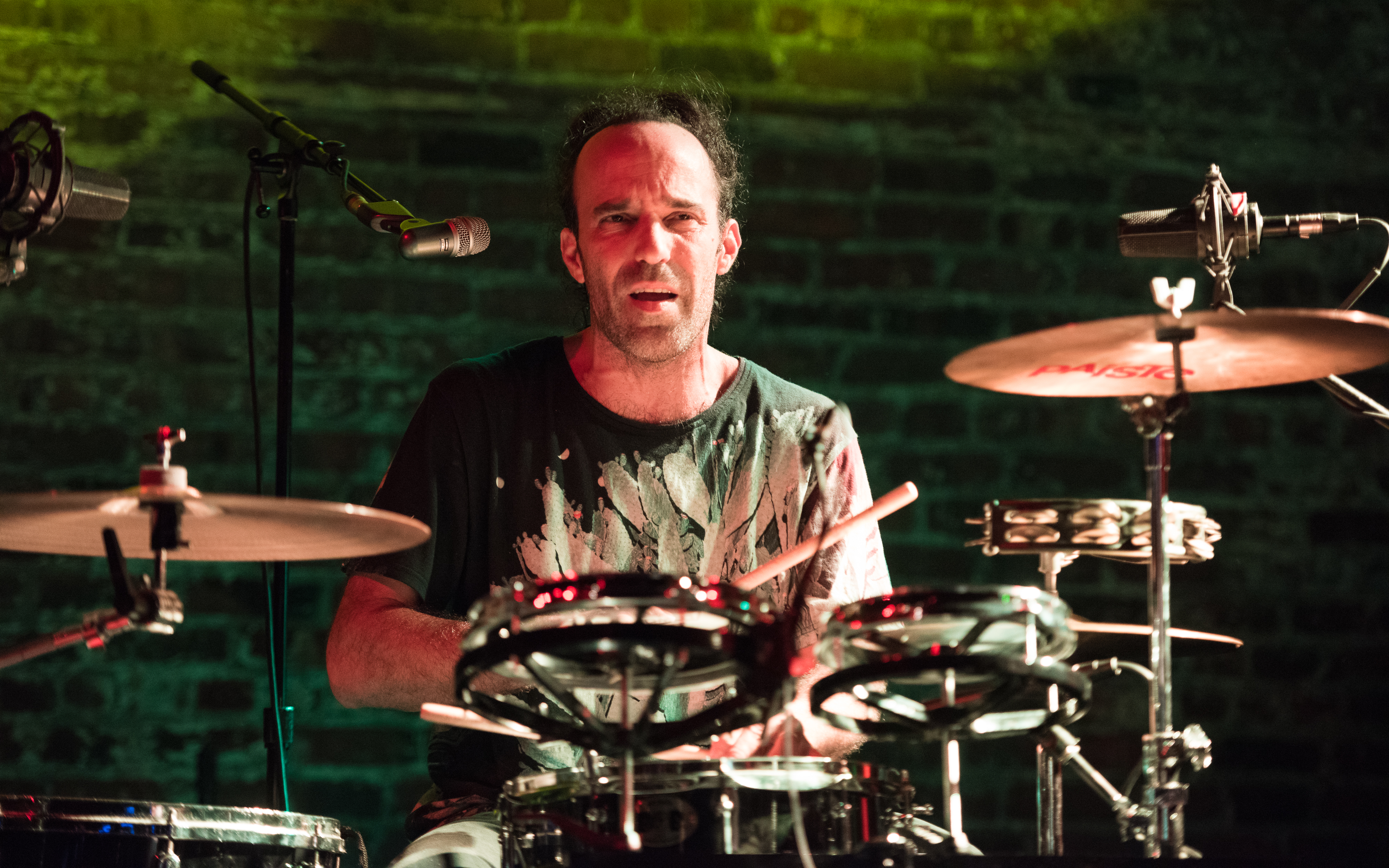
- Muskat in 2015

Background information
- Born: Tamir Muskat; Petah Tikva, Israel
- Genres: Jazz, electronica, worldbeat, trip hop
- Occupations: Musician, producer, record label owner
- Instruments: Drums, percussion, programming
- Years active: 1980–present

Tamir Muskat (Hebrew: תמיר מוסקט) is an Israeli musician/producer-sound engineer who was born and raised in Petah Tikva, Israel as son of a Romanian immigrant. His father was the manager of Anzeagi Conservatorion for music in Petah Tikva. As a teenager, he was already a prominent rock drummer and percussionist. Early on, Tamir started producing Israel's first thrash metal records in his basement studio but also began working with Sephardic Eastern singers of Greek and Turkish origin in a highly ornamented style that is Middle Eastern in nature.

Tamir moved to the United States in 1995 and joined the band Izabo. In 1996, Tamir joined the internationally acclaimed band Firewater as a drummer and producer. With Firewater, he toured the world and made three albums, two of which he produced. Tamir founded Vibromonk Records with Dan Shatzky, which has become an important music production studio in New York City. Since then Tamir has produced albums with exceptional artists from around the world and has helped create a unique musical palette. As a member of Stephen Ulrich's instrumental trio Big Lazy, he released The Big Apple's Creme de la Crème, called "primeval, lurid, mournful, frantic, pretty, dissonant, stark, lush" by The Village Voice and "elegantly gritty stunningly beautiful music" by The New Yorker. Big Lazy has written music for various films, and toured with The White Stripes, John Spencer Blues Explosion, Reverent Horton Heat, Tom Tom Club and Firewater.

In 2002, Tamir launched an electro/gypsy/punk project called J.U.F., with Ori Kaplan and members of Gogol Bordello. The band created a new music scene in New York City, making remixes for Gypsy labels in Europe and DJing.

The band Balkan Beat Box is a progression of this style of music, taking a worldly approach to the music of their ancestors and evolving it to not only include the region of the world that they emigrated from, but they also to incorporate the musical styles from their parents' and grandparents' birthplaces.

In 2007, Muskat opened Vibromonk East in Tel Aviv, where he produces records for artists from around the globe.

== Discography ==
- Asaf Avidan -"Different Pulses" – producer, musician, engineer, mixer
- Oren Barzilay – "Sorrow demons joy blizzards" – producer, musician, engineer, mixer
- Firewater – The Golden Hour – producer, musician, engineer, mixer
- Hava Alberstain – "Ech etslecha" – producer, musician, engineer, mixer
- Balkan Beat Box – band member
  - Give
  - Blue Eyed Black Boy
  - Nu Med
- Gogol Bordello vs. Tamir Muskat – J.U.F. – band member
- Alaev Family and Tamir Muskat – producer, musician, engineer, mixer
- Big Lazy – 3 albums – band member, producer
