= Ori Kaplan =

Israeli musician

Ori Kaplan אורי קפלן
- Ori Kaplan in 2007

Background information
- Born: Ori Kaplan; October 1, 1969 (age 56); Tel Aviv, Israel
- Genre: Jazz
- Instrument: Saxophone
- Website: www.orikaplan.com

Ori Kaplan (Hebrew: אורי קפלן; born October 1, 1969) is an Israeli jazz saxophonist and a music producer. He moved to the United States in 1991. He has worked with many artists including Shotnez Tom Abbs, Firewater, Gogol Bordello, and Balkan Beat Box (of which he is a founding member). He is also known as DJ Shotnez.

== Career ==
The first band that Kaplan played for was DXM, an underground sampler-driven group in Tel Aviv. He chose playing for DXM instead of taking clarinet lessons.

He stayed in Israel until 1991, which is when he immigrated to the United States. After getting a degree from Mannes College in 1996, Kaplan formed a group with Tom Abbs and Geoff Mann called "Trio Plus". The Trio became a quartet in 1997 when Steve Swell joined.

In the same year, Kaplan also joined a lot of jazz projects related to the Knitting Factory.

Kaplan joined the rock band Firewater in 1998 and toured both the United States and Europe. He also formed his "Ori Kaplan Percussion Ensemble", with Susie Ibarra, Geoff Mann, and Andrew Bemkey.

He joined the band Gogol Bordello after having seen them play the Lower East Side and toured with them extensively from 2001-2004. In 2004 he formed Balkan Beat Box with Tamir Muskat. The band has been touring globally since and has released 4 albums thus far.

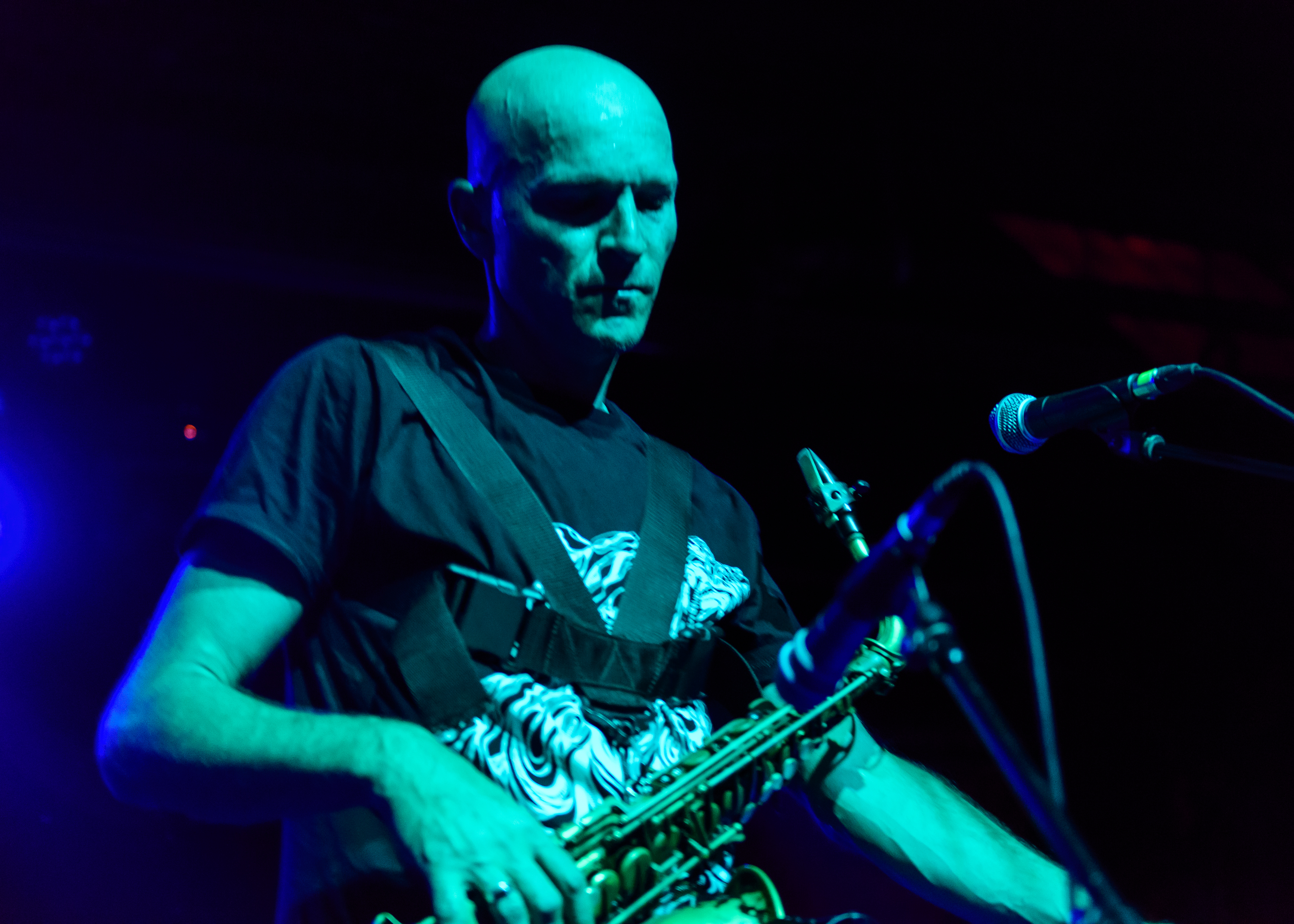
With Balkan Beat Box at Brooklyn Bowl, 2015

Kaplan's saxophone sound is also heard and sampled on 2 top 10 global hits: "Talk Dirty" by American R&B singer Jason Derulo and "Worth It" by American girl group Fifth Harmony, which was co-produced by Kaplan and Stargate. Additionally, Kaplan's sax work can be heard on DreamWorks Animation film, Home (2015).

== Discography ==
- GIVE Balkan Beat Box 2012 - Crammed Discs, Nat Geo Music
- Blue Eyed Black Boy Balkan Beat Box 2010 - Crammed Discs, Nat Geo Music
- Balkan Beat Box Nu Med - Crammed Disc, Jdub Records
- Balkan Beat Box Balkan Beat Box - Essay Recordings, Jdub Records
- JUF (Gogol Bordello VS. Tamir Muskat) - Stinky Records
- Man on the Burning Tightrope - Firewater Jetset Records
- Multi Kontra Culti - Gogol Bordello Rubric Records
- Le Magus - Ori Kaplan Shaat'nez Band - KFW 307
- Realms - Ori Kaplan Trio Plus - CIMP
- Cries of Disillusion - Kaplan with Assif Tsahar, Daniel Sarid, Bob Meyer, Oded
- Goldshmidt - Third Ear Records
- Delirium - Ori Kaplan 4tet (Trio Plus Steve Swell)- CIMP
- Gongol - Ori Kaplan Percussion Ensemble with Susie Ibarra - KFW 284

With William Parker

- Mayor of Punkville (AUM Fidelity, 1999)
- Raincoat in the River (Eremite, 2001)
- Spontaneous (Splasc(H), 2002)
- For Percy Heath (Victo, 2005)

With Alan Silva

- Alan Silva & the Sound Visions Orchestra (Eremite, 2001)
