= Eos =

Greek goddess of the dawn

- Personification of the Dawn
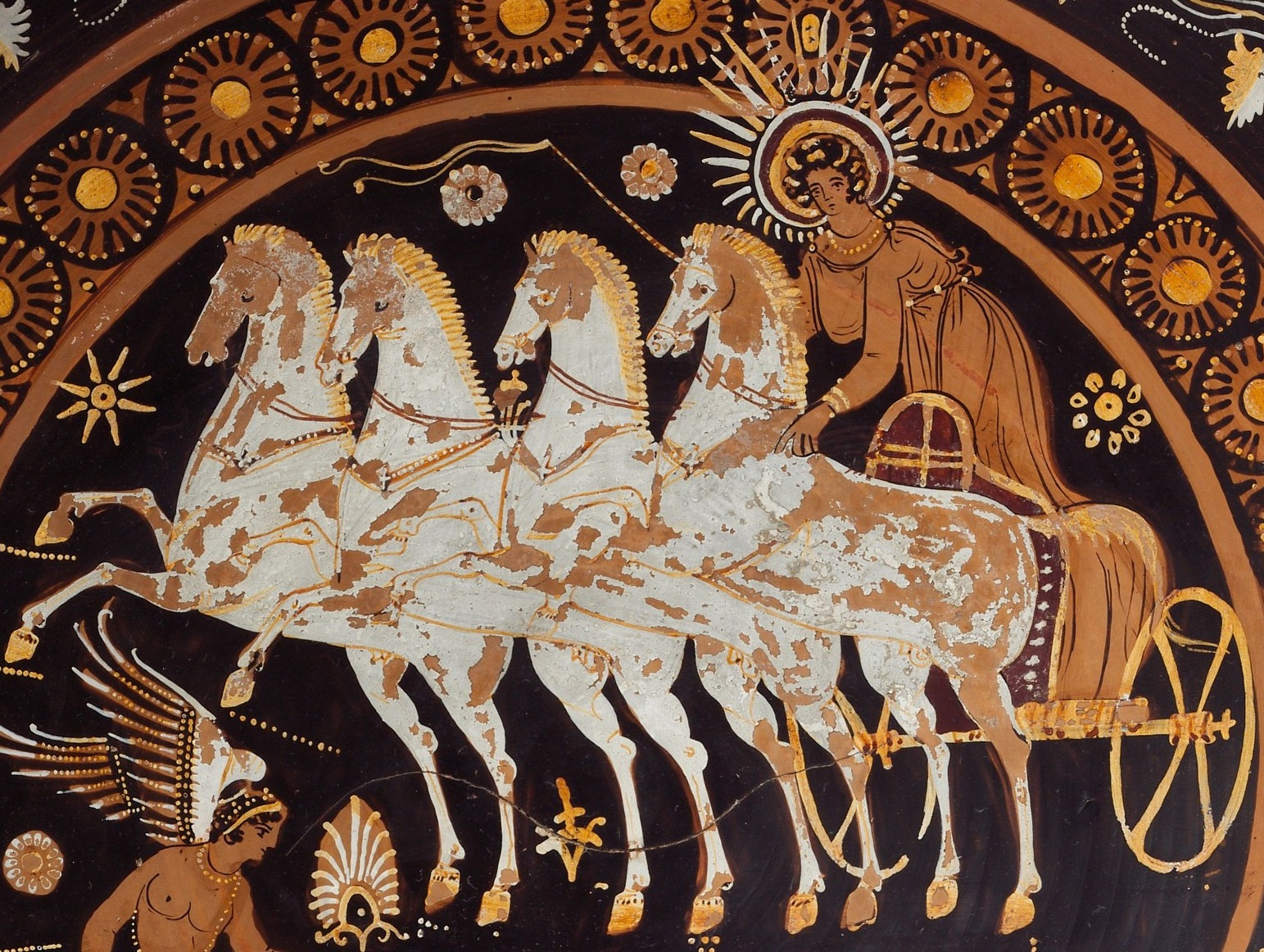
- Eos in her four-horse-drawn chariot, terracotta red-figure lekanis vase, late 4th century BC, Canosa, Metropolitan Museum of Art
- Ancient Greek: Ἠώς
- Abode: Sky
- Animals: Cicada, horse
- Symbol: Saffron, cloak, roses, tiara
- Color: Red, white, pink, gold, saffron
- Mount: A chariot drawn by two or four horses

Genealogy
- Parents: Hyperion and Theia
- Siblings: Helios and Selene
- Consort: Astraeus, Orion, Cephalus, Cleitus, Ares, Tithonus
- Children: The Anemoi (Boreas, Eurus, Notus and Zephyrus), Planetae, Memnon, Emathion, Astraea, Phosphorus, Hesperus

Equivalents
- Hindu: Ushas
- Indo-European: H₂éwsōs
- Roman: Aurora

In ancient Greek mythology and religion, Eos (/ˈiːɒs/; Ionic and Homeric Greek Ἠώς Ēṓs, Attic Ἕως Héōs, "dawn"; Aeolic Αὔως Aúōs, Doric Ἀώς Āṓs) is the goddess and personification of the dawn, who rose each morning from her home at the edge of the river Oceanus to deliver light and disperse the night. She opened the gates of heaven for her brother Helios (the Sun), to pass through, and was imagined in poetry and art as a radiant, often winged goddess driving her horse-drawn chariot across the sky, bringing with her the colours and dew of morning.

In Greek literature, Eos is presented as a daughter of the Titans Hyperion and Theia, the sister of Helios and Selene (the Moon). In rarer traditions, she is the daughter of the Titan Pallas. Each day she heralds the breaking of the new day and the arrival of Helios; although primarily associated with dawn and early morning, she is sometimes said to accompany him for the whole duration of his journey, and thus can also be seen near dusk. Her most common epithets in the Homeric epics are Rhododactylos, or "rosy-fingered", a reference to the sky's colours at daybreak, and Erigenia, "early-born".

Eos also appears in Greek tradition as the mother, by Astraeus, of the Anemoi, the winds, as well as of several astral figures connected with the morning and evening sky. Like her Roman counterpart Aurora and the Rigvedic Ushas, she continues the name and character of an earlier Indo-European dawn goddess, Hausos.

A major group of myths concerns Eos's love for mortal men, whom she pursued and sometimes carried away in a manner more often associated with male gods and mortal women. In surviving tradition, this desire is explained as the work of Aphrodite, who cursed the goddess with passion for mortal men after Eos slept with Ares. Her most notable mortal lover is the Trojan prince Tithonus, for whom she secured immortality but not eternal youth, leading him to age forever. In another story, she carried off the Athenian Cephalus against his will, though she eventually let him return to his wife Procris.

Eos figures in many works of ancient literature and poetry, but despite her antiquity and Proto-Indo-European origins, there is little evidence of her having received extensive independent cult or being the centre of worship during classical times.

== Etymology ==
The Proto-Greek form of Ἠώς / Ēṓs has been reconstructed as *ἀυhώς / auhṓs. It is cognate to the Vedic goddess Ushas, Lithuanian goddess Aušrinė, and Roman goddess Aurora (Old Latin Ausosa), all three of whom are also goddesses of the dawn. Meissner (2006) suggested an áwwɔ̄s > /aṷwɔ̄s/ > αὔως lengthening for Aeolic and */aṷwɔ̄s/ > *āwɔ̄s > *ǣwɔ̄s > /ǣɔ̄s/ for Attic-Ionic Greek.

Lycophron calls her by an archaic name, Tito, meaning "day" and perhaps etymologically linked to "Titan". Karl Kerenyi observes that Tito shares a linguistic origin with Eos's lover Tithonus, which belonged to an older, pre-Greek language.

=== In Greek dialects ===
In Mycenaean Greek her name is also attested in the form 𐀀𐀺𐀂𐀍 in Linear B, a-wo-i-jo (Āw(ʰ)oʰios; reconstructed *Ἀϝohιος), (Note: Foreign scholars interpret this name as "matinal", "matutino", "mañanero", meaning "of the early morning", "of the dawn".) found in a tablet from Pylos; (Note: Also found on the KN Dv 1462 tablet from Heraklion.) it has been interpreted as a shepherd's personal name related to "dawn", or dative form Āwōiōi.

=== Former proposals ===
Heinrich Wilhelm Stoll offered a different (now rejected) etymology for ἠὼς, linking it to the verb αὔω, meaning "to blow", "to breathe."

== Origins ==
=== Proto-Indo-European dawn goddess ===
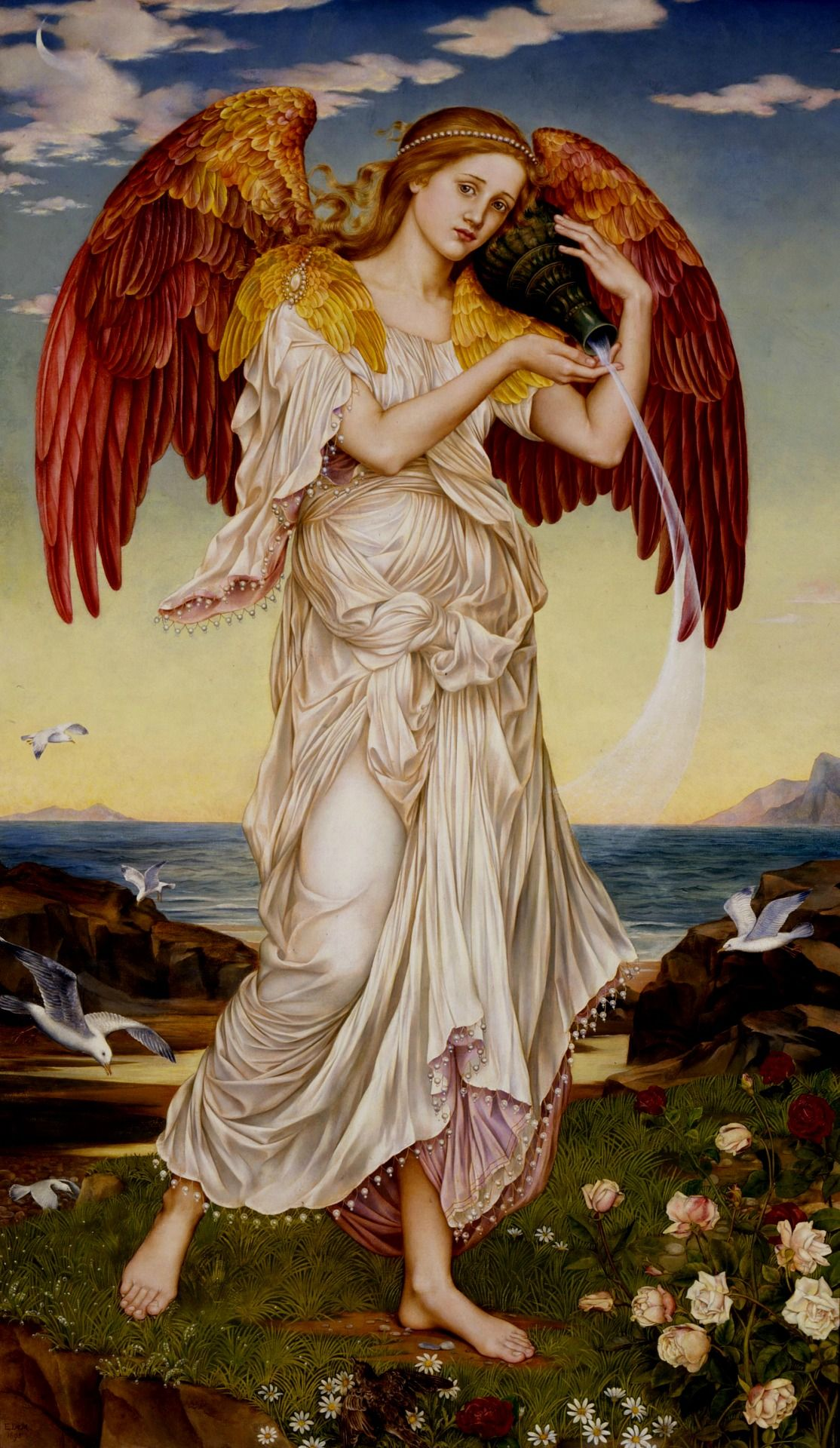
Eos by Evelyn De Morgan (1895)

All four of the aforementioned goddesses sharing a linguistic connection with Eos are considered derivatives of the Proto-Indo-European stem *h₂ewsṓs (later *Ausṓs), "dawn". The root also gave rise to Proto-Germanic *Austrō, Old High German *Ōstara and Old English Ēostre / Ēastre. These and other cognates led to the reconstruction of a Proto-Indo-European dawn goddess, *h₂éwsōs.

In the Greek pantheon, Eos, Helios and Zeus are the three gods that are of impeccable Indo-European lineage in both etymology and status, although the former two were sidelined in the pantheon by non-PIE newcomers. A common epithet associated with this dawn goddess is *Diwós D^{h}uǵh_{2}tḗr, the 'Daughter of Dyēus', the sky god. In Homeric tradition however, Eos is never stated to be the daughter of Zeus (Διὸς θυγάτηρ, Diòs thugátēr), as she is instead the daughter of the Titan Hyperion, who plays little role in mythology or religion. Rather, a commonly occurring epithet of hers is δῖα, dîa, meaning "divine", from earlier *díw-ya, which would have translated into "belonging to Zeus" or "heavenly".

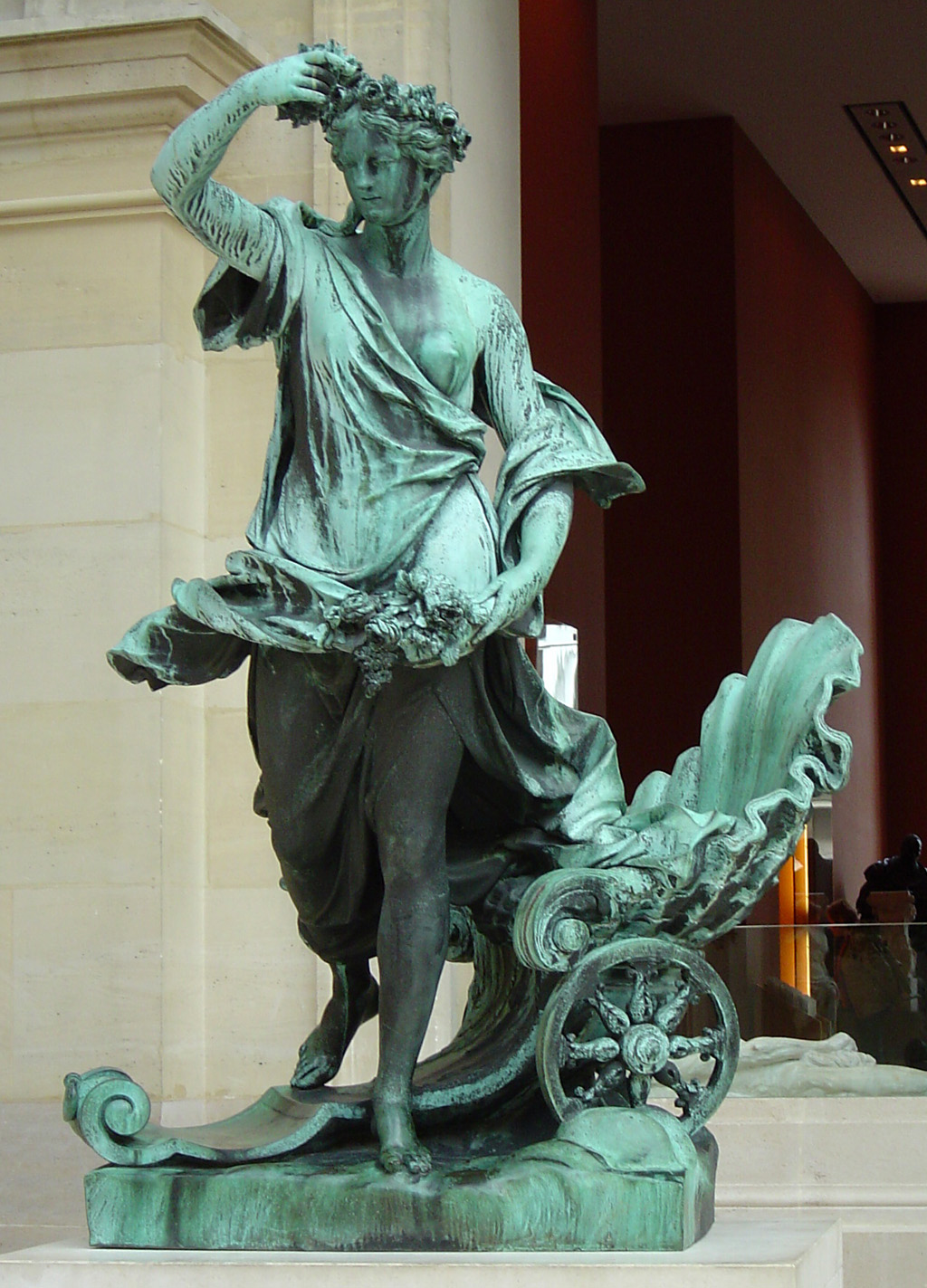
L' Aurore, 1693 bronze statue of Eos by Philippe Magnier (1647–1715), on display at Louvre Museum, France.

Eos's characterization as a lovestruck, sexual being who took many lovers is directly inherited from her PIE precursor. A common and widespread theme among Hausos's descendants is their reluctance to bring the light of the new day. Eos (and Aurora) is sometimes seen as unwilling to leave her bed in the morning, while Uṣas is punished by Indra for attempting to forestall the day, and the Latvian Auseklis was said to be locked up in a golden chamber so she could not always rise in the morning.

This Indo-European goddess of the dawn was often conflated and equated with Hemera, the goddess of the day and daylight. Eos might have also played a role in Proto-Indo-European poetry.

=== Connection to Aphrodite ===
Eos also shares some characteristics with the love goddess Aphrodite connoting perhaps a semi-shared origin or influence of Eos/*H_{a}éusōs on Aphrodite, who otherwise has a Near Eastern origin; both goddesses were known for their erotic beauty and aggressive sexuality, both had relationships with mortal lovers, and both were associated with the colors red, white, and gold. Michael Janda etymologizes Aphrodite's name as an epithet of Eos meaning "she who rises from the foam [of the ocean]" and points to Hesiod's Theogony account of Aphrodite's birth as an archaic reflex of Indo-European myth. On the other hand, however, it is generally accepted that Aphrodite's name etymology is Semitic in origin, and its exact meaning and derivation cannot be determined. Evidence is also provided by an Italic red-figure krater in which Aphrodite is shown holding a mirror beneath a solar disc while the Theban hero Cadmus slays the dragon, with a female figure nearly identical to Aphrodite being depicted on another krater labelled "ΑΩΣ", or Aṓs, the dawn; this shows that although Aphrodite is assimilated to Astarte/Inanna, in Greek artistic tradition she is sometimes presented in a similar matter to Eos.

Like Eos, no tales of men assaulting Aphrodite exist, but there are many where she abducts mortal men reversing the traditional theme of gods and men pursuing maidens, in the same fashion as Eos. Not only does Aphrodite abduct or seduce mortal men as Eos does, but even cites Eos's own adventures with Tithonus when she seduces Anchises. The two goddesses are presented as both maleficent and beneficent abductors, as they confer both death (maleficent) and preservation (beneficent) to their mortal lovers. The two goddesses exist almost side by side in the myth of Phaethon of Syria, with Eos as his mother and Aphrodite as his lover and abductor. Moreover, another telling point is how the name “Aoos” is recorded as both a name for Adonis, Aphrodite's East-originating lover, and a son of Eos by Cephalus (like Phaethon) who became king of Cyprus, an island that was regarded as Aphrodite's birthplace. This suggest a mixture of Mycenaean and Phoenician religions on the island; it is possible that Aoos was originally a generic name used for Eos's son or lover, which was then attached to Aphrodite in the form of a consort of the same name as she developed from Eos.

== Description ==
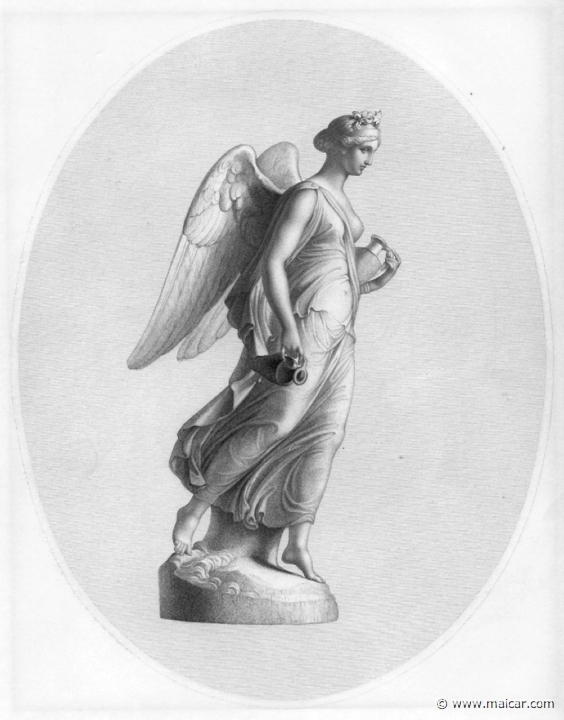
Eos, Sig. Guglielmi's drawing of a statue of Aurora by John Gibson (1790–1866).

Eos is usually described with rosy fingers or rosy forearms as she opened the gates of heaven for the Sun to rise: the singer in the Homeric Hymn to Helios calls her ῥοδόπηχυν (ACC), "rosy-armed", as does Sappho, who also describes her as having golden arms and golden sandals; vases depict her rosy-fingered, with golden arms.

She is pictured on Attic vases as a beautiful woman, crowned with a tiara or diadem and with the large white-feathered wings of a bird. In Homer, her saffron-colored robe is embroidered or woven with flowers. Mesomedes of Crete used χιονοβλέφαρος for her, "she who has snow-white eyelids", while Ovid described her as "golden". The delicate and fragile beauty of her appearance seems to be in total contrast with the carnal nature that was often attributed to her in myth and literature.

== Family ==
=== Parents ===
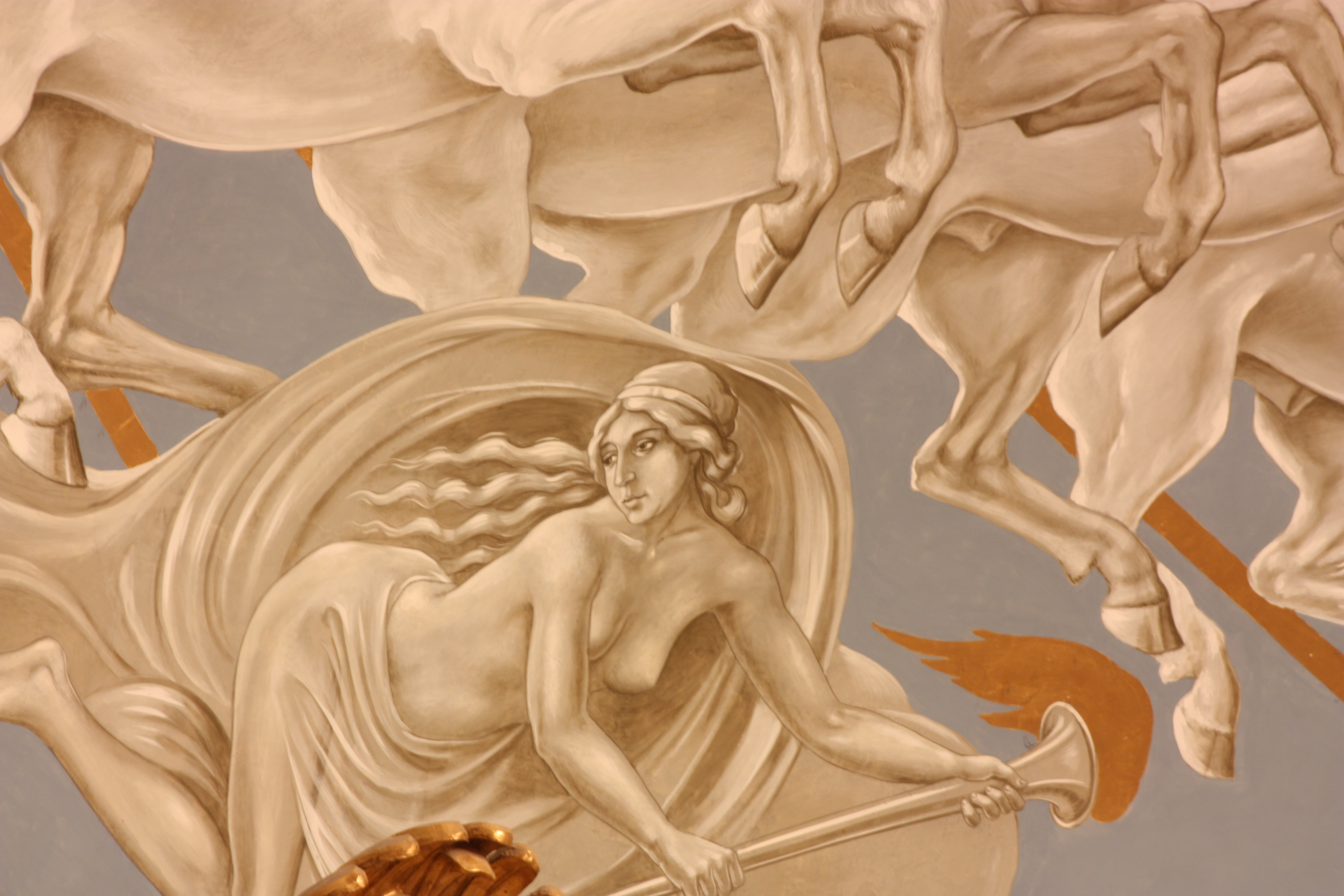
Eos in front of the chariot of the Sun, Wiesbaden Kurhaus.

According to Greek cosmogony, Eos is the daughter of the Titans Hyperion and Theia: Hyperion, a bringer of light, the One Above, Who Travels High Above the Earth and Theia, The Divine, also called Euryphaessa, "wide-shining" and Aethra, "bright sky". Eos is the sister of Helios, the god of the sun, and Selene, the goddess of the moon, "who shine upon all that are on earth and upon the deathless gods who live in the wide heaven". Out of the four authors that give her and her siblings a birth order, two make her the oldest child, the other two the youngest. (Note: Hesiod and Hyginus both give their birth order as first Helios/Sol, then Selene/Luna and lastly Eos/Aurora. Pseudo-Apollodorus makes her the oldest child (with Selene as the youngest) as does the author of Helios's Homeric Hymn (with Helios as the youngest).) In some accounts, Eos's father was called Pallas, who is also confirmed to be the father of Eos's sister Selene in some rare traditions. Even though the two goddesses are still connected as sisters in the traditions going with lineage from Pallas, their brother Helios is never included with them in those versions, being consistently the son of Hyperion. Mesomedes made her the daughter of Helios, who is usually her brother, by an unnamed mother. Some authors made her the child of Nyx, the personification of the night, who is the mother of Hemera in the Theogony.

=== Offspring ===
Eos married the Titan Astraeus ("of the stars") and became the mother of the Anemoi ("winds") namely Zephyrus, Boreas, Notus and Eurus; of the Morning Star, Eosphoros (Venus); of the stars; and of the virgin goddess of justice, Astraea ("starry one"). Her other notable offspring were Memnon and Emathion by the Trojan prince, Tithonus. Sometimes, Hesperus, Phaethon and Tithonus (different from her lover), were said to be the children of Eos by Prince Cephalus of Athens.

== Mythology ==
=== Goddess of the dawn ===
Each morning, the dawn goddess Eos gets up and opens the gates for her brother, Helios, to pass through and rise, ushering in the new day. Although often her job seems to be done once she announces Helios's coming, in the Homeric epics she accompanies him throughout the whole day, and does not leave him until the sunset; hence "Eos" might be used in texts where one would have expected to see "Helios" instead. In Musaeus's rendition of the story of Hero and Leander in the sixth century AD, Eos is mentioned during both sunrise and sunset.

==== Homer and Hesiod ====
From the Iliad:

Now when Dawn in robe of saffron was hastening from the streams of Oceanus, to bring light to mortals and immortals, Thetis reached the ships with the armor that the god had given her.

...

But soon as early Dawn appeared, the rosy-fingered, then gathered the folk about the pyre of glorious Hector.

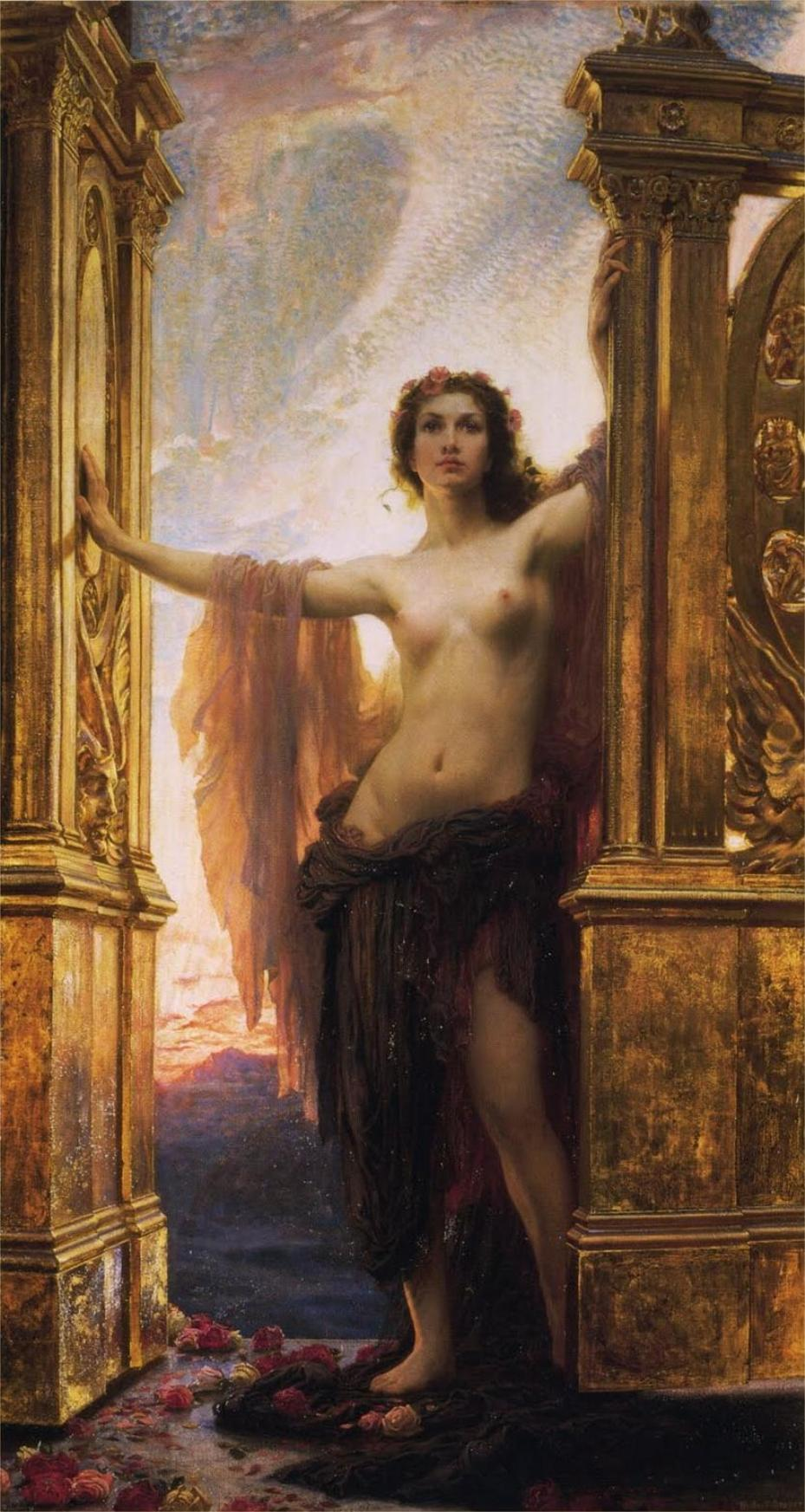
The Gates of Dawn, 1900 oil-on-canvas painting by Herbert James Draper.

She is most often associated with her Homeric epithet "rosy-fingered" Eos Rhododactylos (Ancient Greek: Ἠὼς Ῥοδοδάκτυλος), but Homer also calls her Eos Erigeneia:

That brightest of stars appeared, Eosphoros, that most often heralds the light of early-rising Dawn (Eos Erigeneia).

Near the end of the Odyssey, Athena, wanting to buy Odysseus some time with his wife Penelope after they have reunited with each other, orders Eos not to yoke her two horses, thus delaying the coming of the new day:

And rose-fingered Dawn would have shone for the weepers had not bright-eyed goddess Athena thought of other things. She checked the long night in its passage, and further, held golden-throned Dawn over Ocean and didn't let her yoke her swift-footed horses, that bring daylight to men, Lampus and Phaethon, the colts that carry Dawn.

In the Theogony, Hesiod wrote "[a]nd after these Erigeneia ["Early-born"] bore the star Eosphoros ("Dawn-bringer"), and the gleaming stars with which heaven is crowned". Thus Eos is preceded by the Morning Star, and is thus seen as the genetrix of all the stars and planets; her tears are considered to have created the morning dew, personified as Ersa or Herse, who is otherwise the daughter of her sister Selene by Zeus.

==== Orphic literature ====
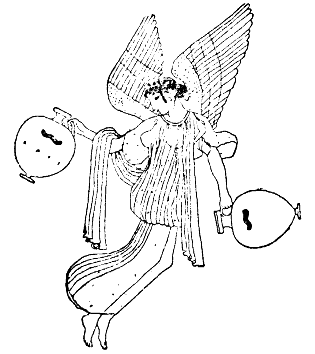
Eos pouring the morning dew dressed in a starsprinkled robe, from an antique vase

Eos is addressed by the singer in one of the Orphic Hymns, as the bringer of the new day:

Hear, O goddess, you bring the light of day to mortals
resplendent Dawn, you blush throughout the world
messenger of the great, the illustrious Titan.

— Orphic Hymn 78 to the Dawn.

The position of the hymn in the collection at number 78 is odd, far from the Hymns to the Night (3), the Sun (8) and the Moon (9), where it would be expected to be grouped. While many of the Orphic Hymns describe the divinities in terms on light, the hymn to Eos is the only one that calls upon the divinity to provide light to the initiates.

==== Divine horses ====
Eos's team of horses pull her chariot across the sky and are named in the Odyssey as "Firebright" and "Daybright". Quintus described her exulting in her heart over the radiant horses (Lampus and Phaëton) that drew her chariot, amidst the bright-haired Horae, the feminine Hours, the daughters of Zeus and Themis who are responsible for the changing of the seasons, climbing the arc of heaven and scattering sparks of fire.

=== Lovers ===
In spite of the goddess already having a husband in the face of her first cousin Astraeus, Eos is presented as a goddess who fell in love several times. According to Pseudo-Apollodorus, it was the jealous Aphrodite who cursed her to be perpetually in love and have an insatiable sexual desire because Eos had once lain with Aphrodite's sweetheart Ares, the god of war. The curse caused her to abduct a number of handsome young men. This explanatory myth was the reason offered for Eos's ravenous sexual desires, as this pattern of behavior of hers was noticed by the ancient Greeks.

In the Odyssey, Calypso complains to Hermes about the male gods taking many mortal women as lovers, but not allowing goddesses to do the same. She brings up as example Eos's love for the hunter Orion, who was killed by Artemis on the island of Ortygia. Apollodorus also mentions Eos's love for Orion, and adds that she brought him to Delos, where he met Artemis and was subsequently slain by her. The good-looking Cleitus was snatched and made immortal by her.

Eos fell in love and abducted Cephalus, a son of Hermes, who is sometimes the same as or distinct from the Cephalus that was the husband of Procris, whom she also abducted. Some other versions suggest that Eos also was the abductor of Ganymede.

==== Tithonus ====
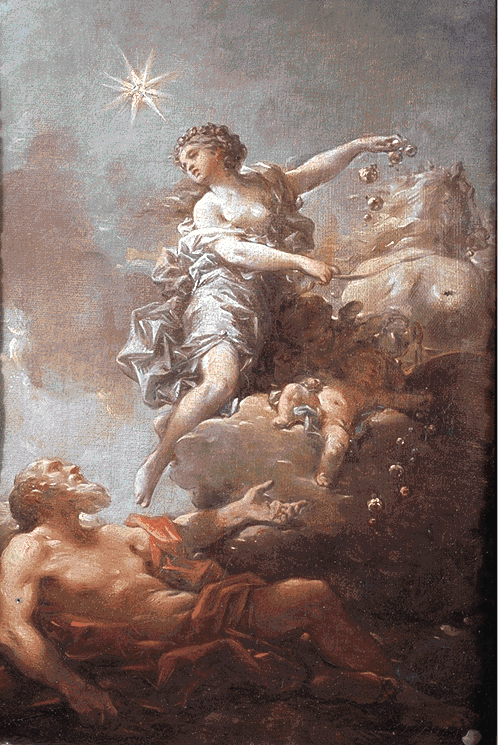
Eos and Tithonus, by Julien Simon, 1783, Musée des Beaux-Arts de Caen.

The myth about the love of Eos and Tithonus is very old, known as early as Homer, who in the Odyssey described the coming of the new morning as Eos rising from the bed she shares with Tithonus to bring her light to the world. The earliest (and fullest) account survives in the Homeric Hymn to Aphrodite, where Aphrodite herself narrates the story to her own lover Anchises. Additionally, the myth is also the subject of one of the very few substantially complete works of Sappho, pieced together from different fragments discovered over a period of more than a hundred years, (Note: The first modern printing of the complete poem was published in two sections by Michael Gronewald and Robert W. Daniel in Zeitschrift für Papyrologie und Epigraphik vol. 147, pp. 1–8, and vol. 149, pp. 1–4 (2004); an English translation by Martin West is printed in the Times Literary Supplement, 21 or 24 June 2005. The right half of this poem was previously found in fragment 58 L-P. The fully restored version can be found in M. L. West, "The New Sappho", in Zeitschrift für Papyrologie und Epigraphik, vol. 151, pp. 1–9 (2005).) known as the Tithonus poem or the Old Age poem:

...old age already (withers?) all (my) skin, and
(my) hair (turned white) from black
] (my) knees do not carry (me)
] (to dance) like young fawns
] but what could I do?
] not possible to become (ageless?)
] rosy-armed Dawn [...]
carrying (to) the ends of the earth
] yet (age) seized (him)
] (immortal?) wife.

— Sappho, fragment 58.

The myth goes that Eos fell in love with and abducted Tithonus, a handsome prince from Troy, either the brother or the son of King Laomedon (the father of Priam). She went with a request to Zeus, asking him to make Tithonus immortal for her sake. Zeus agreed and granted her wish, but Eos foolishly forgot to ask for eternal youth as well for her beloved. So for a while the two lived happily in her palace, but their happiness eventually came to an end when Tithonus's hair started turning grey as he aged, and Eos ceased to visit him in their bed. Despite that, the goddess kept him around and nourished him with food and ambrosia; Tithonus never died as he had gained immortality as Zeus promised, but he kept aging and shrivelling, and was soon unable to even move. In the end, Eos locked him up in a chamber, where he withered away alone, forever a helpless old man. Out of pity, she turned him into a small bug, a cicada (Greek τέττιξ, tettix).

In the account of Hieronymus of Rhodes from the third century BC, the blame is shifted from Eos and onto Tithonus, who asked for immortality but not agelessness from his lover, who was then unable to help him otherwise and turned him into a cicada. Propertius wrote that Eos did not forsake Tithonus, old and aged as he was, and would still embrace him and hold him in her arms rather than leaving him deserted in his cold chamber, while cursing the gods for his cruel fate.

This myth might have been used to explain why cicadas were particularly noisy during the early hours of the morning, when the dawn appears in the sky. Sir James George Frazer notes that there was a widespread notion among the ancient Greeks and other ancient peoples that the creatures that shed their skin renew their youth and get to live forever. It could also be a reference to the fact that the high-pitched talk of old men was compared to a cicada's singing, as evidenced in a passage from the Iliad. The ancient Greeks would use a cicada, the most musical of insects, sitting on a harp as an emblem of music. Cicadas were also believed to be able to survive off of dew alone, a substance closely associated with Eos.

==== Cephalus ====
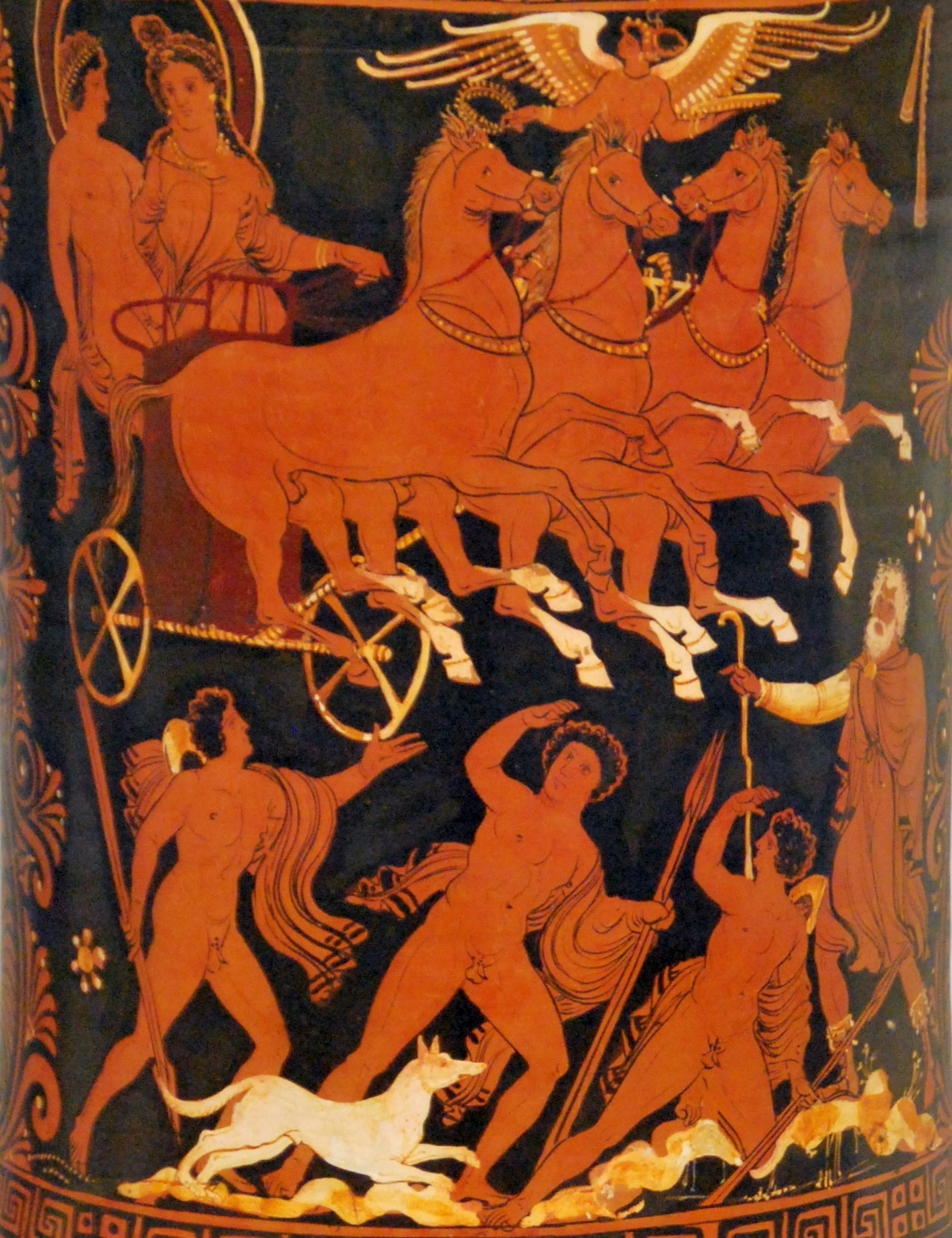
The rape of Cephalus by Eos, Apulian red-figure Loutrophoros, ca. 330 BC

The abduction of Cephalus had special appeal for an Athenian audience because Cephalus was a local boy, and so this myth element appeared frequently in Attic vase-paintings and was exported with them. In the literary myths, Eos snatched Cephalus against his will when he was hunting and took him to Syria. Although Cephalus was already married to Procris, Eos bore him three sons, including Phaethon and Hesperus, and in some versions the little-attested Aoos who went on to become king of Cyprus, but he then began pining for Procris, causing a disgruntled Eos to return him to Procris, but not before sowing the seeds of doubt in his mind, telling him that it was highly unlikely that Procris had stayed faithful to him this entire time.

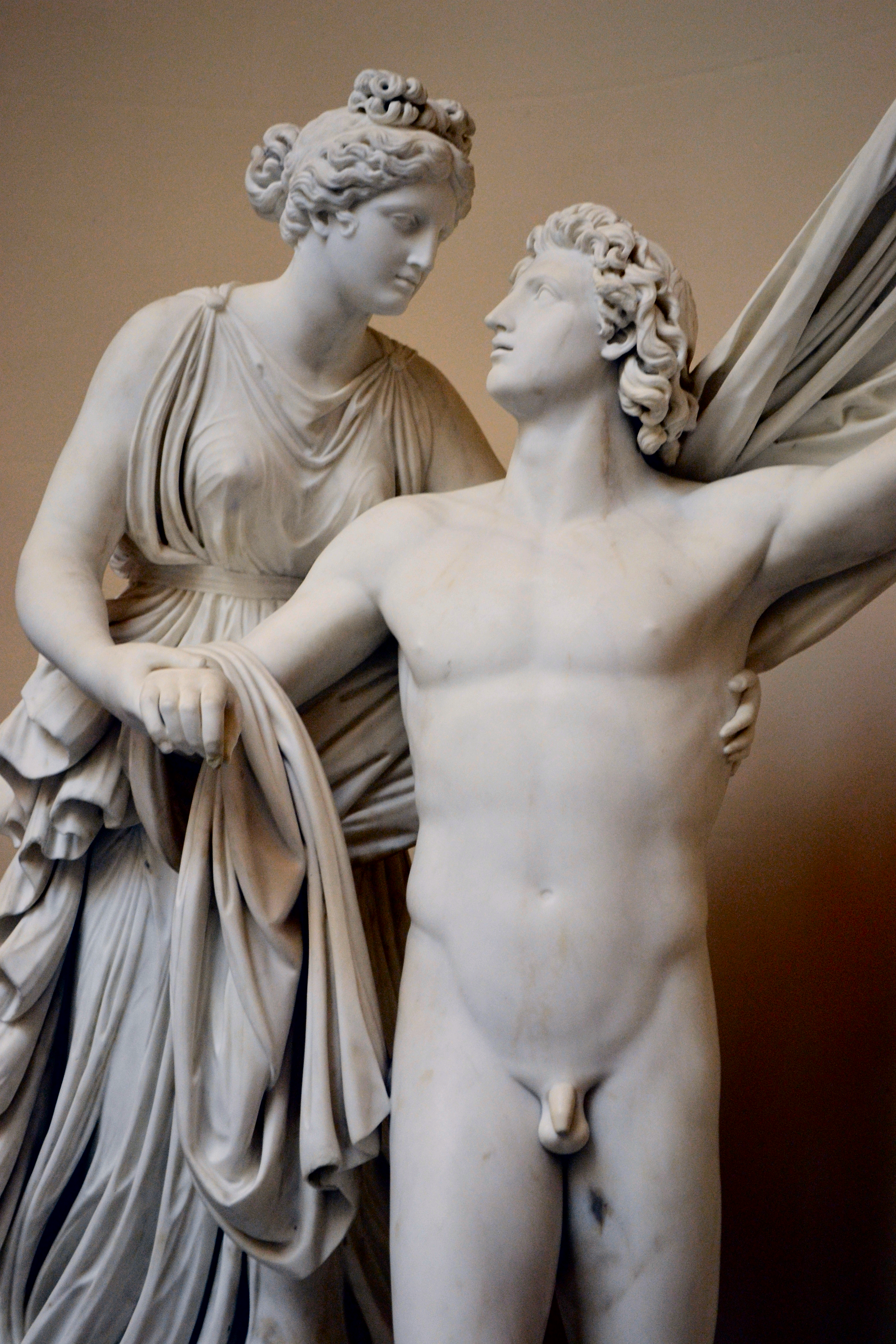
Cephalus and Aurora, John Flaxman, 1789–90, Lady Lever Art Gallery.

Cephalus, troubled by her words, asked Eos to change his form into that of a stranger's, in order to secretly put Procris's love for him to the test. Cephalus, now disguised, propositioned Procris, who at first declined but eventually gave in when he offered her money. He was hurt by her betrayal, and she left him in shame, but eventually they got back together. This time however it was Procris's turn to doubt her husband's fidelity; while hunting, he would often call upon the breeze ('Aura' in Latin, sounding similar to Eos's Roman equivalent Aurora) to refresh his body. Upon hearing that, Procris followed and spied on him. Cephalus, mistaking her for some wild animal, threw his spear at her, killing his wife. The second-century CE traveller Pausanias knew of the story of Cephalus's abduction too, though he calls Eos by the name of Hemera, goddess of day.

Hyginus omits the kidnapping from the story, and has Cephalus reject Eos out of fidelity to Procris when she begs him to have sex with her. Eos then says to Cephalus that she would not want him to break his vows if Procris herself has not either, and alters his appearance and gives him gifts to trick Procris. Cephalus then goes to Procris as a stranger, and she agrees to lay with him, thereupon Eos removes the enchantment from Cephalus, revealing his identity. Procris, knowing she has been deceived by Eos, flees; she is eventually reunited with Cephalus, but still fearful of Eos, follows him when he goes out hunting, and ends up being accidentally killed by him.

Antoninus Liberalis also largely follows the same tradition in his rendition of the myth, though his text contains a lacuna, jumping from Eos's abduction of Cephalus to him having doubts over Procris. The oldest extant account of the myth is attributed to Pherecydes, and the elements it contains were all kept by later poets; in his account however Eos plays no role in the myth. That being said, artistic evidence of Eos abducting a man that can be identified as Cephalus goes as far back as the early fifth century BC.

=== Role in wars ===
==== Gigantomachy ====
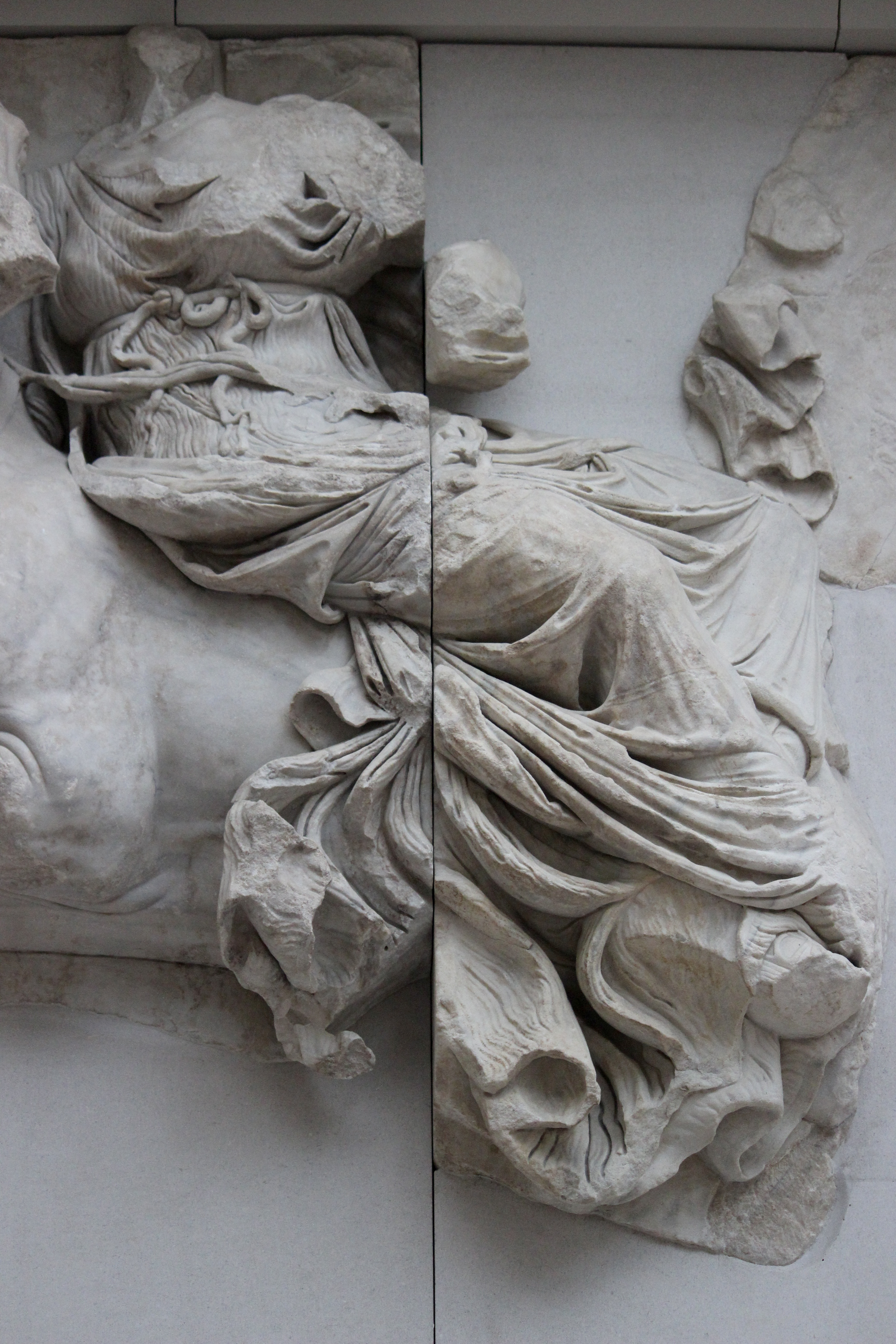
Eos riding sidesaddle, detail of the Gigantomachy frieze, Pergamon Altar, Pergamon museum, Berlin

Eos played a small role in the battle of the earthborn Giants against the gods, known as the Gigantomachy, who rose in rebellion. When their mother, the earth goddess Gaia learned of a prophecy that the giants would perish at the hand of a mortal, Gaia sought to find a herb that would protect them from all harm; thus Zeus ordered Eos, as well as her siblings Selene and Helios not to shine so that she would not be able to seek for it, and harvested all of the plant for himself, denying Gaia the chance to make the Giants indestructible. Moreover, Eos is seen fighting against the Giants in the south frieze of the Pergamon Altar, which depicts the Gigantomachy, where she rides hither on either a horse or a mule right ahead of Helios, swinging herself on the back of her mount while a Giant already lies on the ground underneath her; a robe wound around her hips serves as her saddle-cloth. She is joined in fight against the Giants by her siblings, her mother Theia, and possibly, conjectured due to the disembodied wing to the right of Eos's shoulder, the goddess Hemera.

==== Trojan War ====
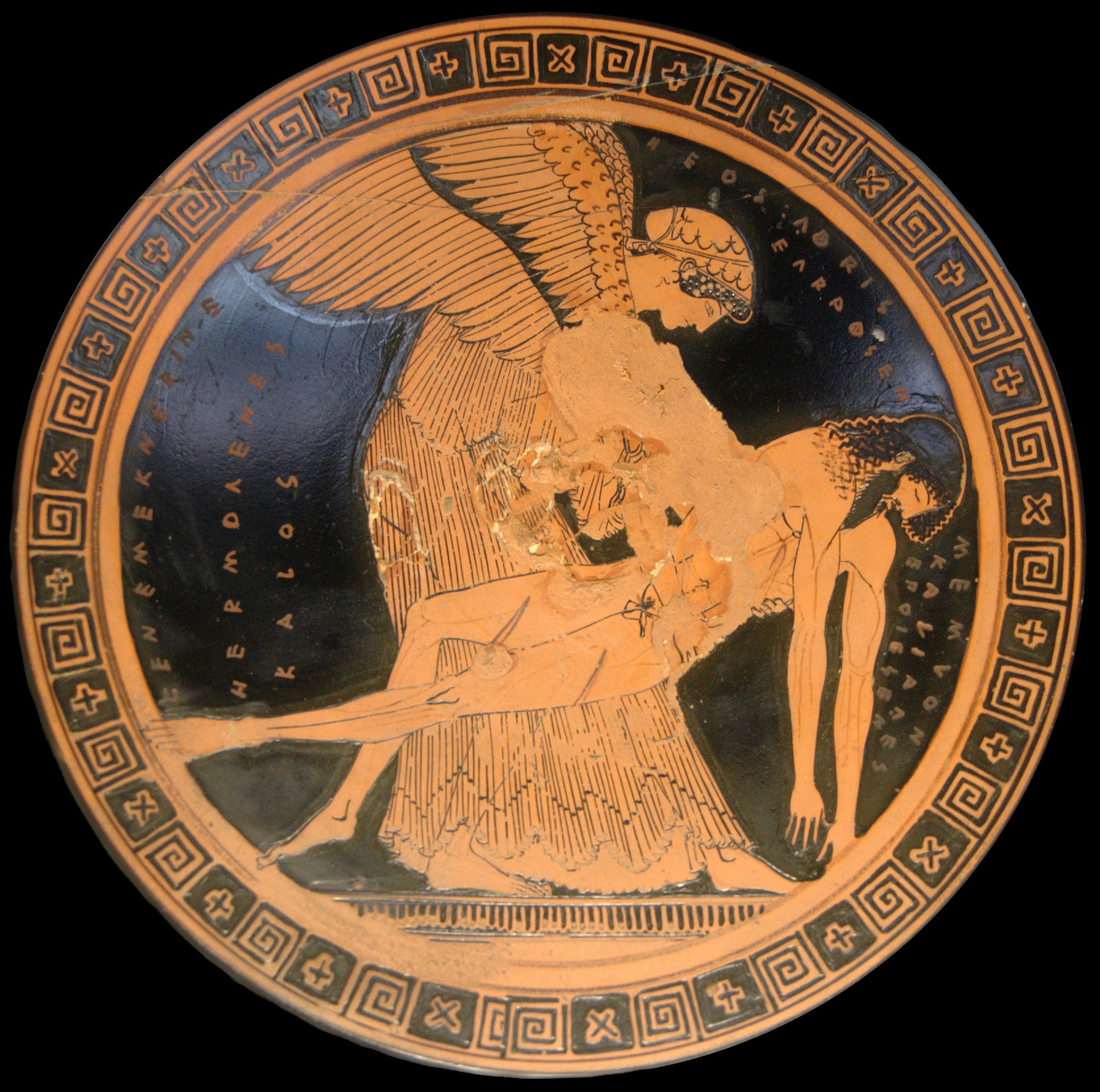
Eos and the slain Memnon on an Attic red-figure cup, ca. 490–480 BCE, the so-called "Memnon Pietà" found at Capua (Louvre).

According to Hesiod, by her lover Tithonus, Eos had two sons, Memnon and Emathion. Memnon, king of Aethiopia, joined the Trojans in the Trojan War and fought against Achilles in battle. Much like Thetis, the mother of Achilles, did before her, Eos asked the smithing god Hephaestus with tears in her eyes to forge an armor for Memnon, and he, moved, did as told.Pausanias mentions images of Thetis and Eos both begging Zeus on behalf of their sons. In the end, it was Achilles who triumphed and slew Memnon in battle.

Mourning greatly over the death of her son, Eos made the light of her brother Helios to fade and begged Nyx, the goddess of the night, to come out earlier, so she could be able to freely steal her son's body undetected by the armies. After his death, Eos, perhaps with the help of Hypnos (Sleep) and Thanatos (Death), transported Memnon's dead body back to Aethiopia; she also asked Zeus to make her son immortal, and he granted her wish. Eos's role in the Trojan War saga mirrors that of Thetis herself; both are goddesses married to aging old men, both see their mortal sons die on the battlefield, and both arrange an afterlife/immortality of sorts for said sons.

== Iconography ==
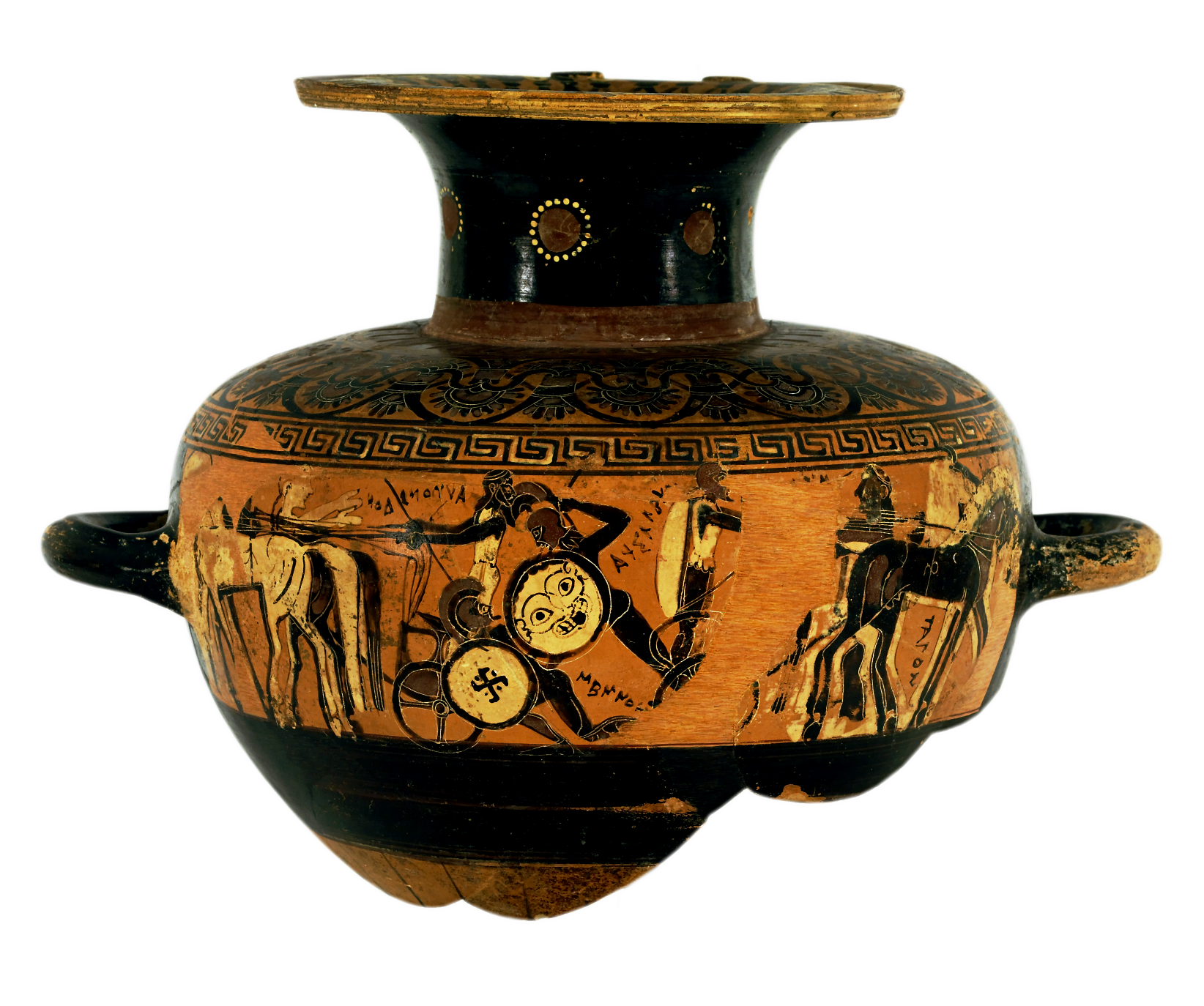
The fight of Achilles and Memnon, in the presence of their mothers Thetis and Eos, late Corinthian Black-Figure hydria, circa 575-550 BC, now in the Walters Art Museum.

Eos was imagined as a woman wearing a saffron mantle as she spread dew from an upturned urn, or with a torch in hand, riding a chariot. Greek and Italian vases show Eos/Aurora on a chariot preceding Helios, as the morning star Eosphorus flies with her; she is winged, wearing a fine pleated tunic and mantle. Eos is not an uncommon figure, especially on red-figure vases; as a single figure she appears rising from the sea in, or driving, a four-horse chariot like her brother Helios, sometimes carrying two hydriae from which she pours morning dew. Because Hermes's rod had the power to both induce sleep to mortals and wake them up, some times he is seen preceding the chariot of Eos (and that of Helios) as the new day breaks.

Although the romantic adventures of Eos is a common subject in pottery, so far as it is known, no vase depicts her with Orion or Cleitus, known lovers of hers, instead those vases fall into groups; those that depict Eos with a young hunter identified as Cephalus, and those that depict Eos with a youth holding a lyre, identified as Tithonus. Sometimes those vases bear inscriptions, and on a few the hunter is identified as Tithonus, while the lyre-player is Cephalus. Perhaps the earliest representation of this theme is found on a red-figure rhyton, a statuette-vase, from circa 480-470 BC in which Eos is depicted carrying of a naked boy, perhaps Cephalus, her wings spread and her feet barely touching the ground. The image of Eos pursuing Tithonus was eerily repetitive in ancient art, as was that of erotic pursuit in general; Tithonus was drawn running off to the right in terror, or trying to clobber with a lyre or a spear the pursuing Eos, indicating the terrifying aspect of a mortal man being taken by a goddess. The image of Zeus, the active erastes, pursuing Ganymede, the passive eromenos, was also common, but in the case of Eos, the female figure was put in the dominant position.

Other depictions of mythological scenes that include Eos are Memnon's battle with Achilles and Eos's pleading of Zeus for his safety, her seizing of Memnon's dead body, and the apotheosis of Alcmene (the mother of Heracles). Among Theia and Hyperion's children, she is the only one depicted with wings, as neither her brother nor her sister ever sport some in art.

== Cult and temples ==
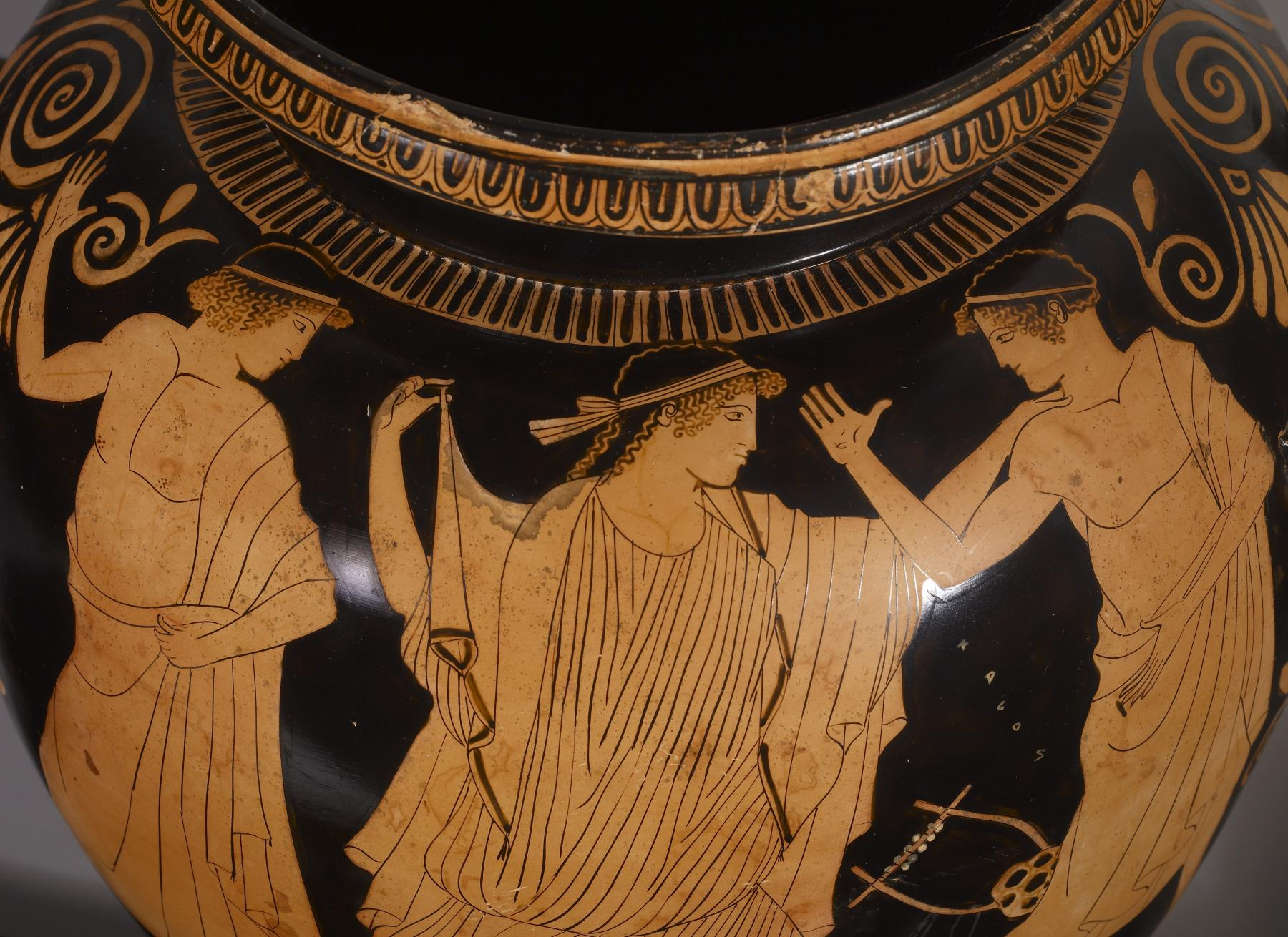
Eos with two young men, red-figure stamnos, ca 470–460 BC, now in the Walters Art Museum.

Eos, along with her brother and sister, is an Indo-European deity, side-lined by the non-IE newcomers to the pantheon; James Davidson argues that apparently persisting on the sidelines was a primary function for them, to be the minor gods that the major gods were juxtaposed to, thus helping to keep the Greek religion Greek. However, whereas her brother and sister did receive minor cults, and in Helios's case even major ones, Eos does not seem to have been the focus of any worship at all. Thus there are no known temples, shrines, or altars to Eos. That being said, Ovid seems to allude to the existence of at least two shrines of Eos, as he describes them in plural, albeit few, in the lines:

‘Least I may be of all the goddesses the golden heavens hold – in all the world my shrines are rarest.’

— Aurora to Jupiter.

Although this could simply be an understated way for Eos to say that she has no temples or shrines whatsoever, nevertheless Ovid may therefore have known of at least two such shrines. However, if Eos did indeed have a handful of shrines and altars in ancient Greece or Rome, no knowledge of them remains.

The only traces of the goddess's worship can be found at Athens, where wineless offerings (or nephalia) were made to Eos, along with other celestial gods and goddesses, including Eos's siblings Helios and Selene, as well as Aphrodite Urania, Mnemosyne, the Muses, and the nymphs. It is possible that the goddess addressed as Orthria and Aotis in a fragment by Alcman is Eos; this is highly debated, but if true, it could mean that Eos was worshipped in some capacity in Sparta during the Archaic period.

== Identifications ==
=== Etruscan ===
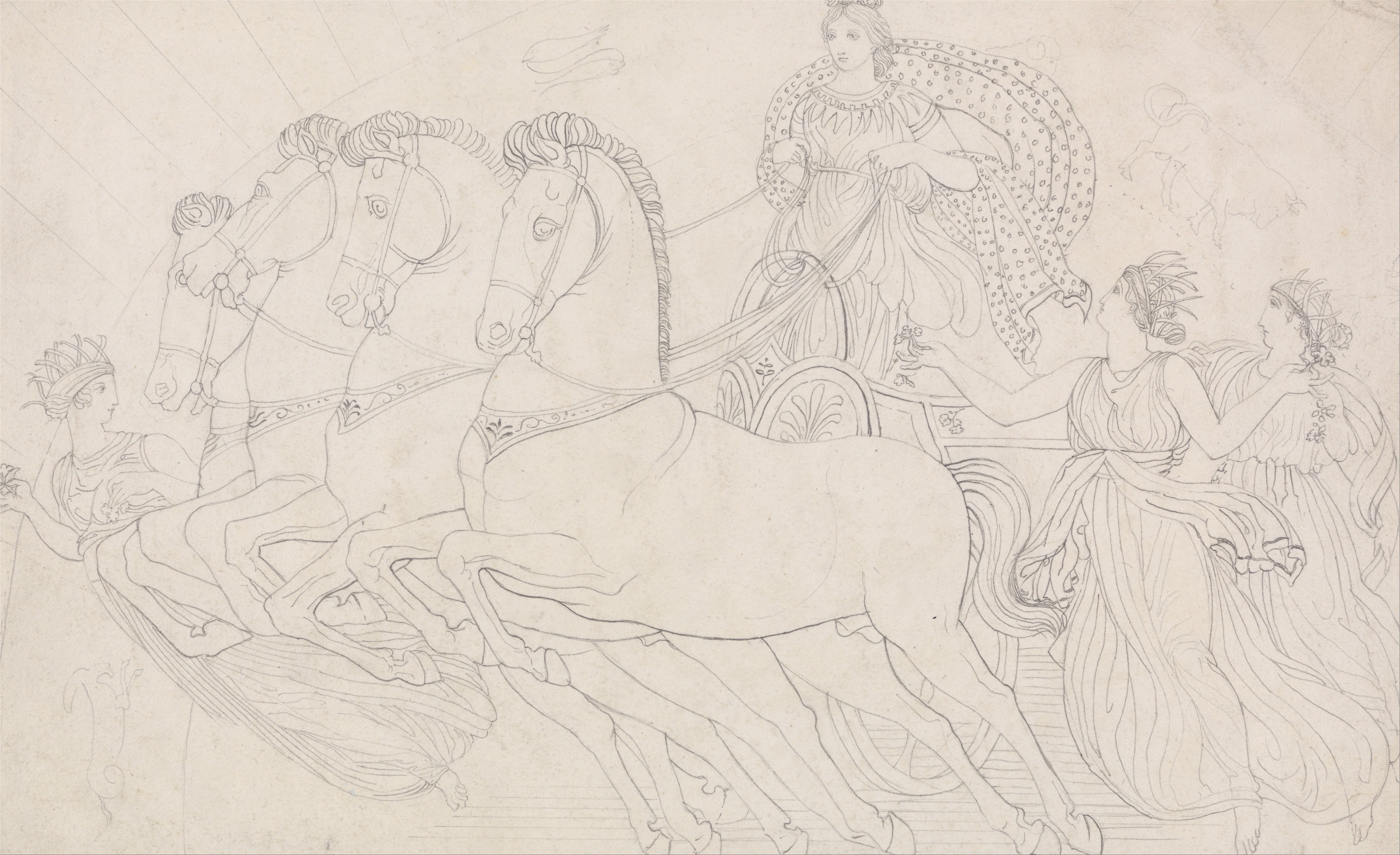
Eos the Morn, engraving by John Flaxman.

Among the Etruscans, the generative dawn-goddess was Thesan. Depictions of the dawn-goddess with a young lover became popular in Etruria in the fifth century, probably inspired by imported Greek vase-painting. Though Etruscans preferred to show the goddess as a nurturer (Kourotrophos) rather than an abductor of young men, the late Archaic sculptural acroterion from Etruscan Cære, now in Berlin, showing the goddess in archaic running pose adapted from the Greeks, and bearing a boy in her arms, has commonly been identified as Eos and Cephalus. On an Etruscan mirror Thesan is shown carrying off a young man, whose name is inscribed as Tinthu.

=== Roman ===
The Roman equivalent of Eos is Aurora, also a cognate showing the characteristic Latin rhotacism. Dawn became associated in Roman cult with Matuta, later known as Mater Matuta. She was also associated with the sea harbors and ports, and had a temple on the Forum Boarium. On June 11, the Matralia was celebrated at that temple in honor of Mater Matuta; this festival was only for women during their first marriage.

=== Hemera ===
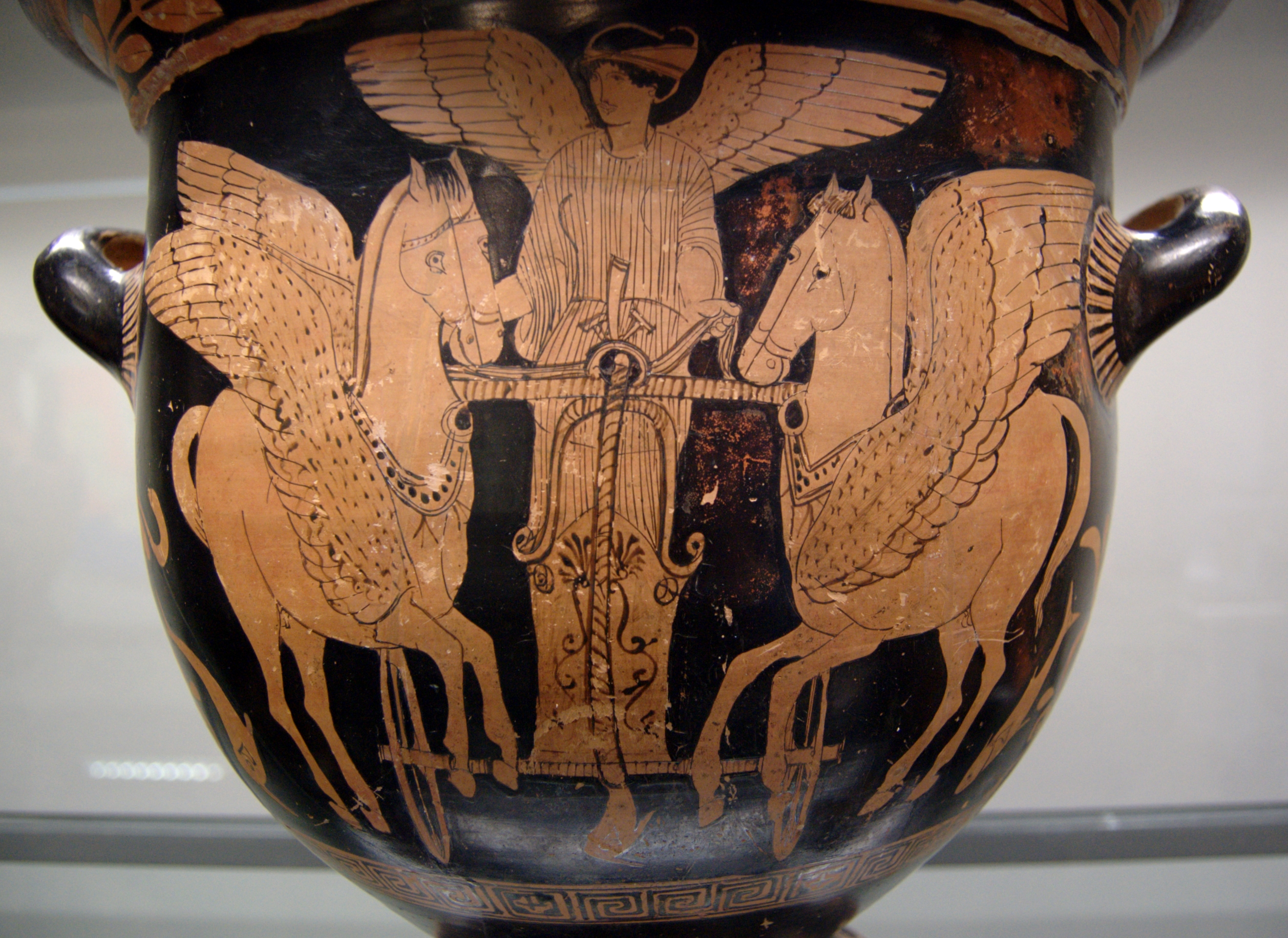
Eos in her chariot flying over the sea, red-figure krater from Southern Italy, 430–420 BC, Staatliche Antikensammlungen

Although distinct deities in early works such as Hesiod's Theogony, later the tragic poets completely identified Eos with Hemera, the primordial goddess of the day; each of the three great Athenian tragedians—Euripides, Aeschylus and Sophocles—used "Hemera" for the goddess who abducts Tithonus or drives a chariot drawn by white horses at daybreak in some work.

Both goddesses were said to be daughters of Nyx (Night), albeit Eos was much more commonly the daughter of Hyperion by his wife. Pausanias, when describing depictions of Eos's myths at Athens and Amyclae, he calls Eos by the name of Hemera. A scholion on the Odyssey mentions the abduction of the hunter Orion by "Hemera" (Eos in Homer). Eos, in contrast to Helios and Selene and more similarly to Hemera and Hemera's mother Nyx, embodies a part of the day and night cycle, instead of a celestial body. The Greek word "eos", meaning dawn, was some times used by writers to refer to the entire duration of the day, not just the morning.

Likewise, Eos was often referred to as Tito, another archaic word meaning day, and feminine equivalent to Titan, which is a common epithet of her brother Helios denoting his role as the creator of the day. Unlike Eos however, Hemera is little more than a name in Greek literature, with few and far between references about her and with no unique mythology outside of her parentage and the few stories appropriated from Eos.

== Gallery ==
Eos in art

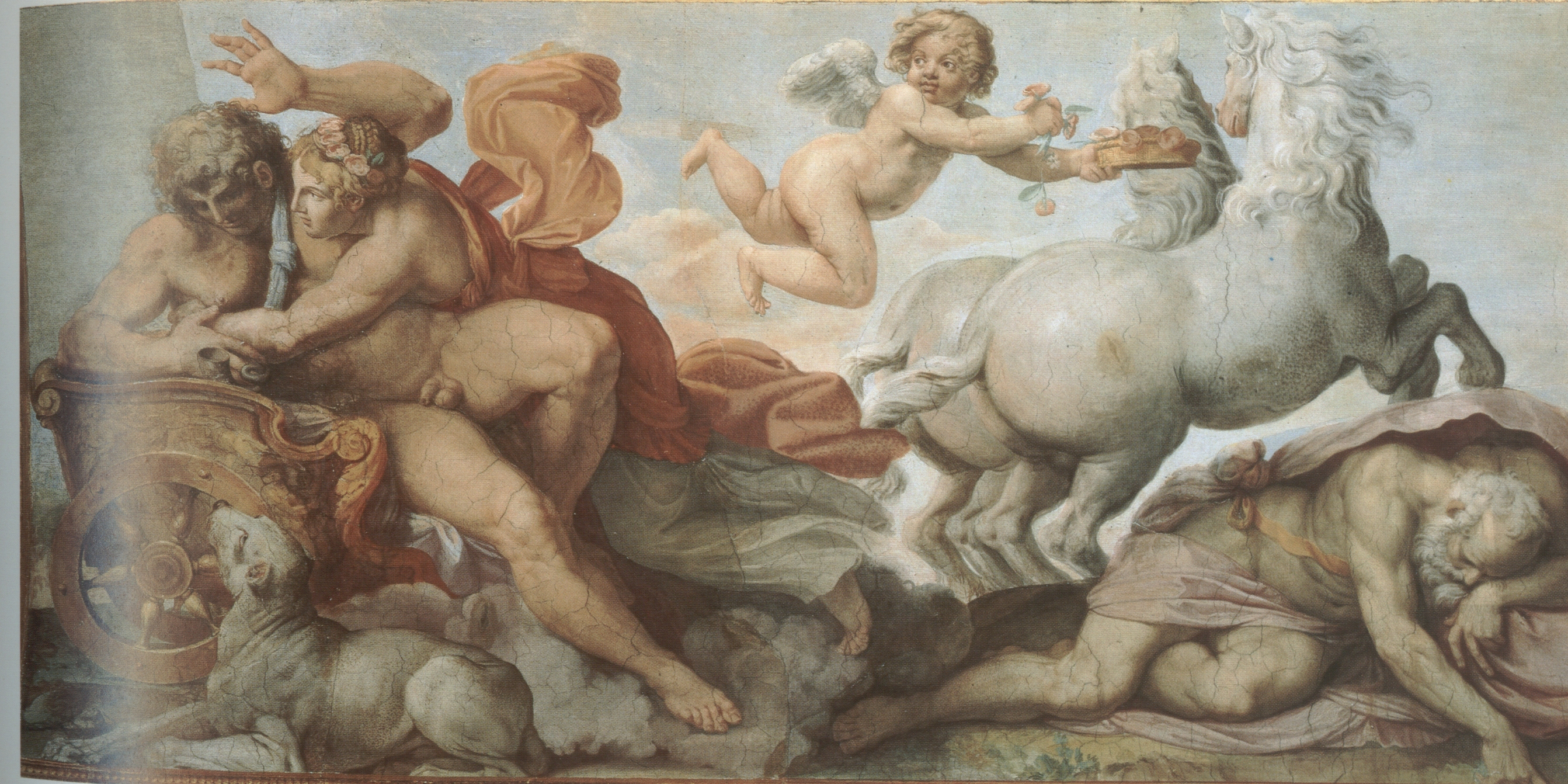
Aurora and Cephalus from The Loves of the Gods fresco.

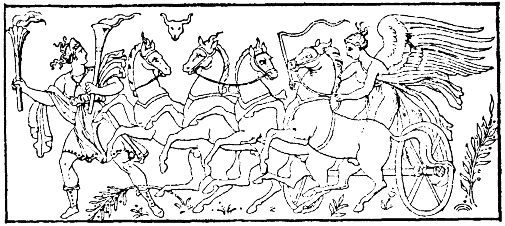
Eos driving a four-horse chariot, from an antique vase.

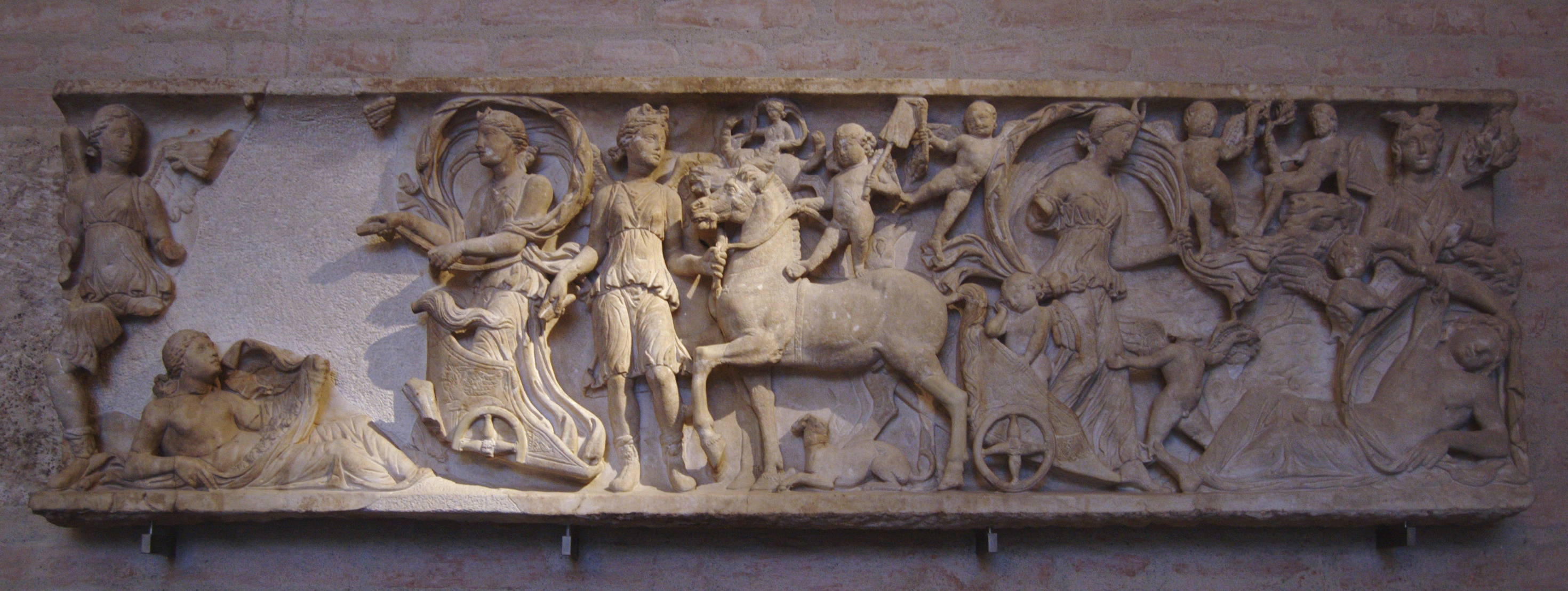
Eos in the sarcophagus of Selene and Endymion.

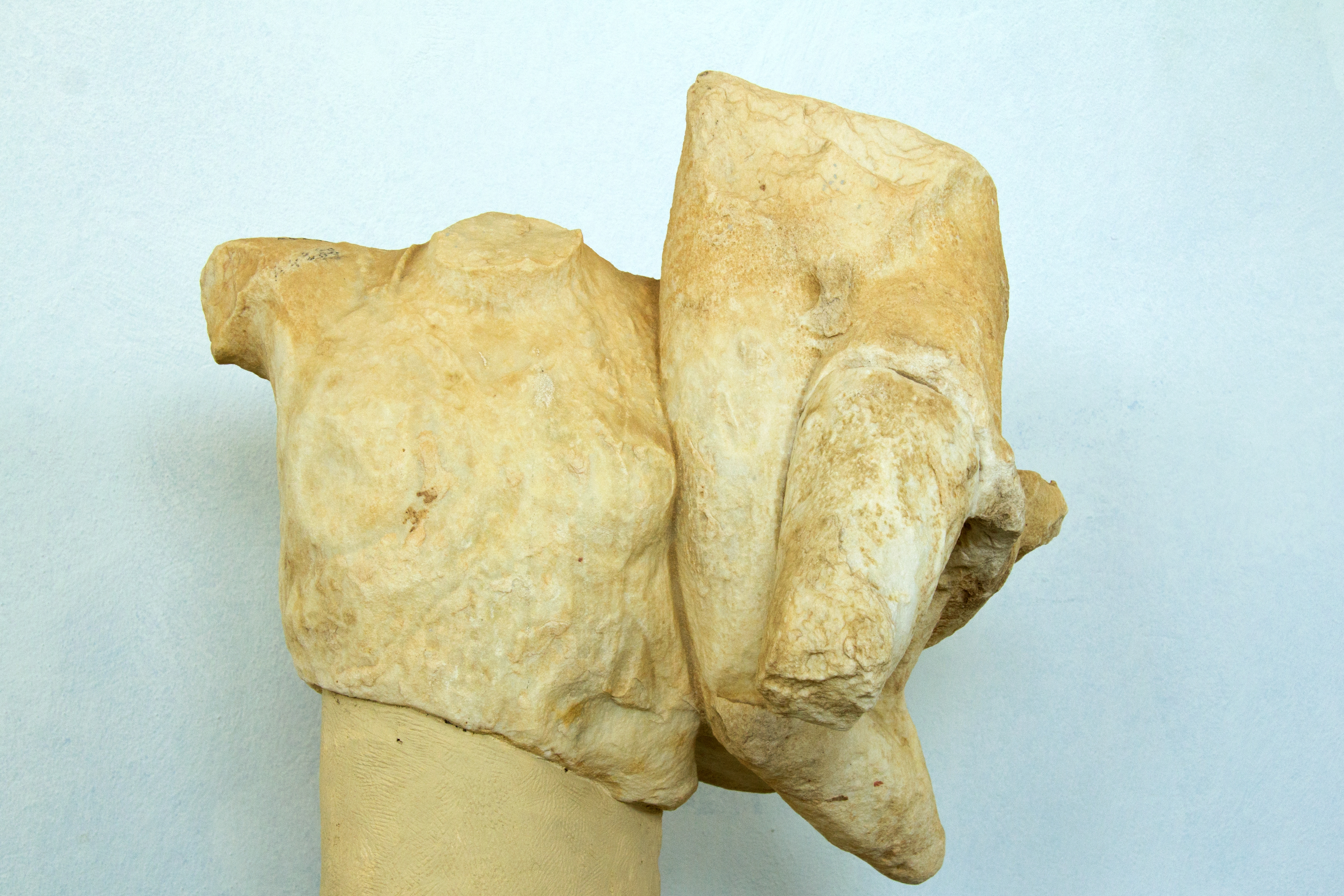
Fragments of Eos carrying off Cephalus, from Delos.

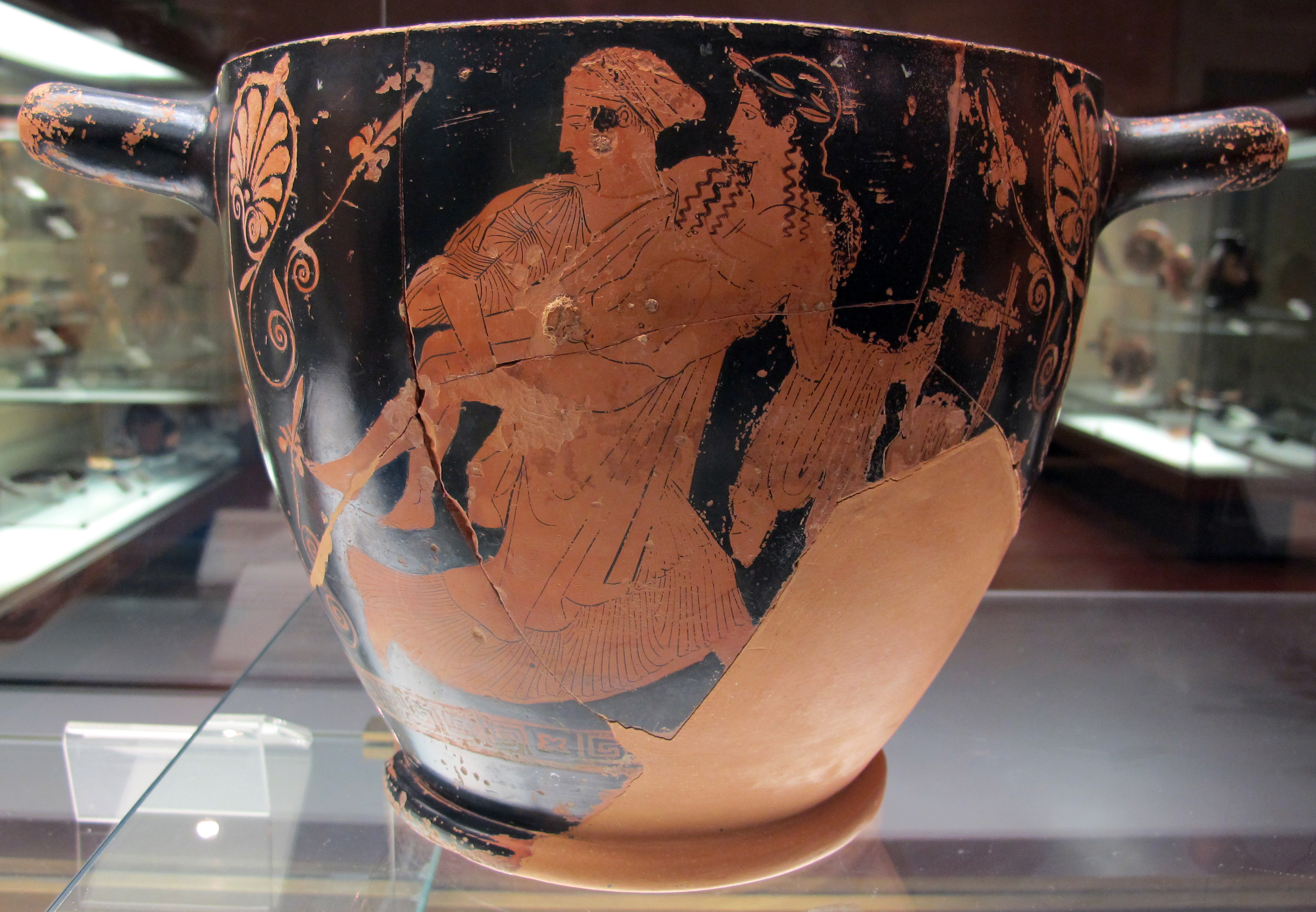
Eos abducts Tithonus, Archaeological Museum of Florence.

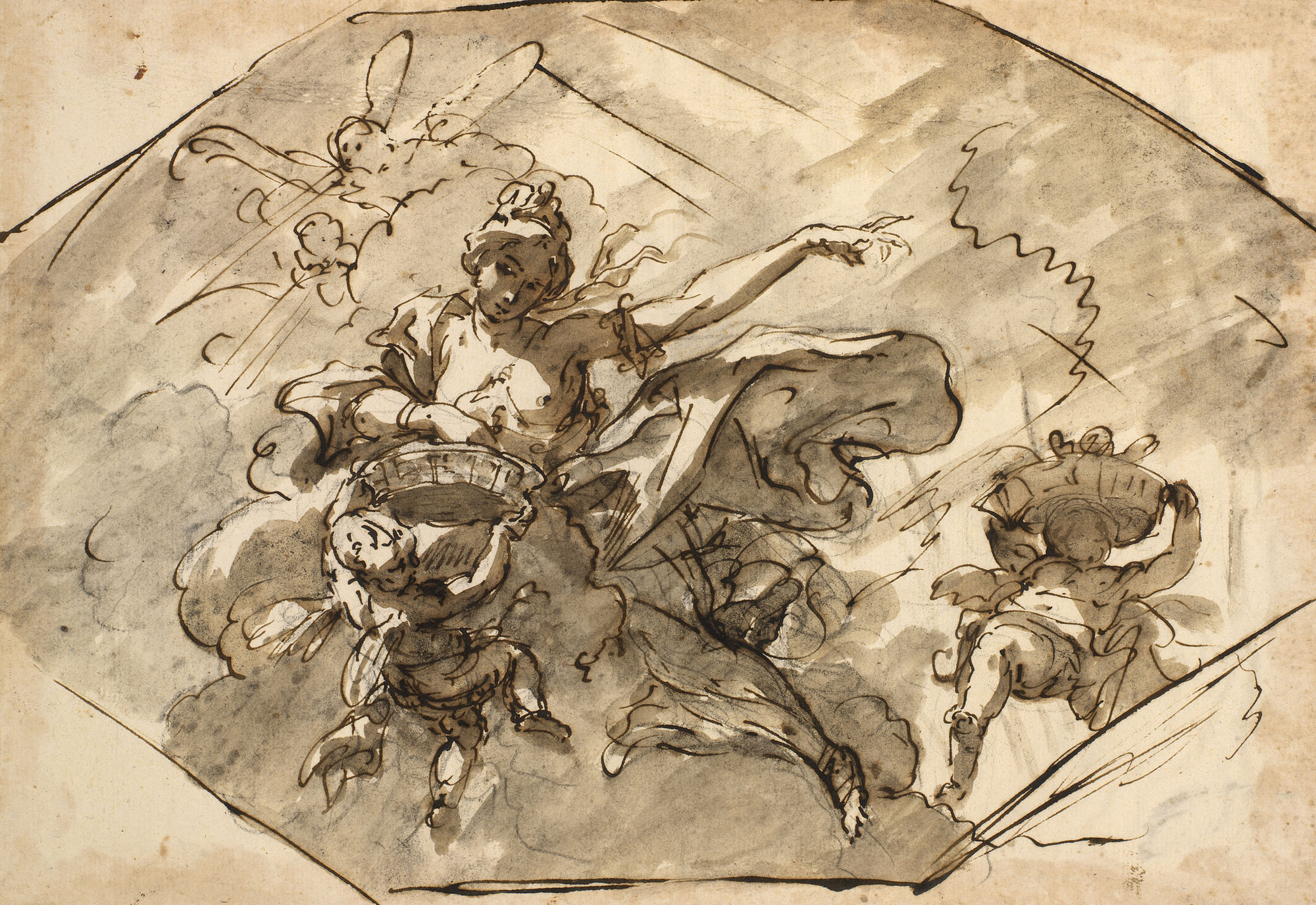
Eos and Tithonus, by Sebastiano Ricci.

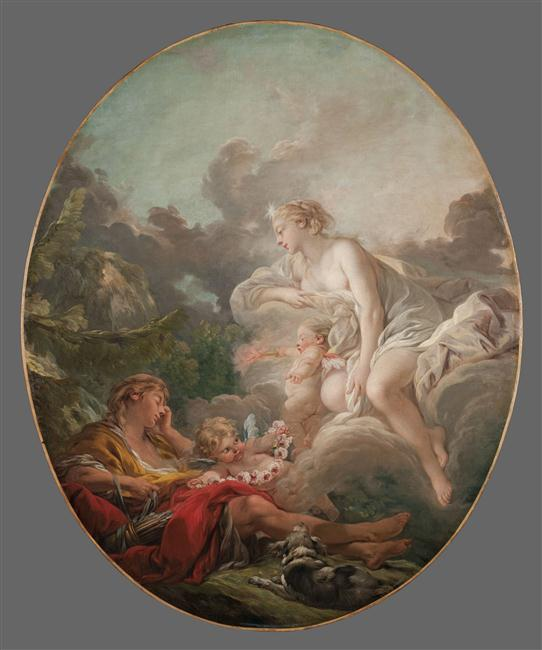
Céphale and Aurore, François Boucher.

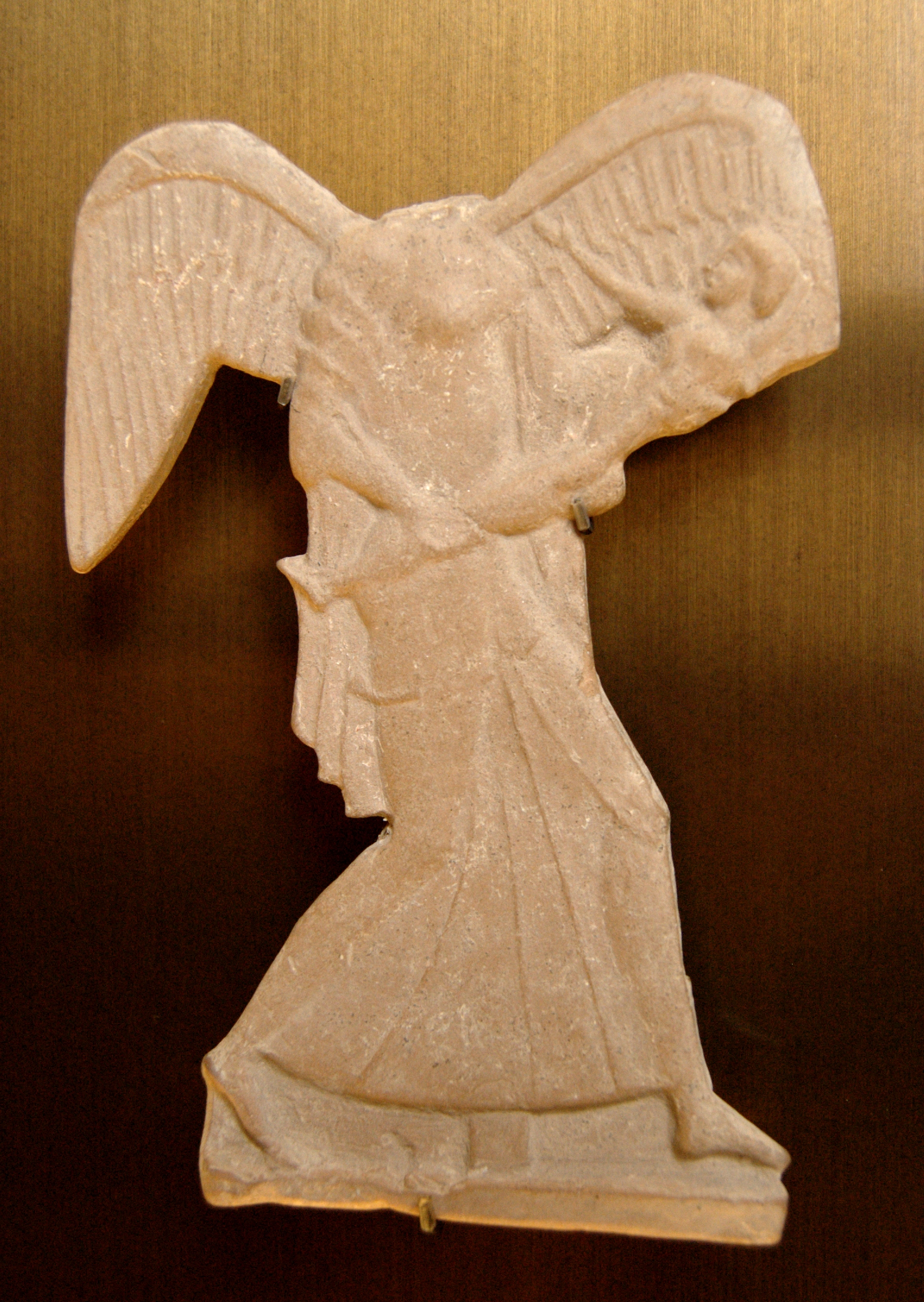
Eos carrying off a man in a relief from Milos.

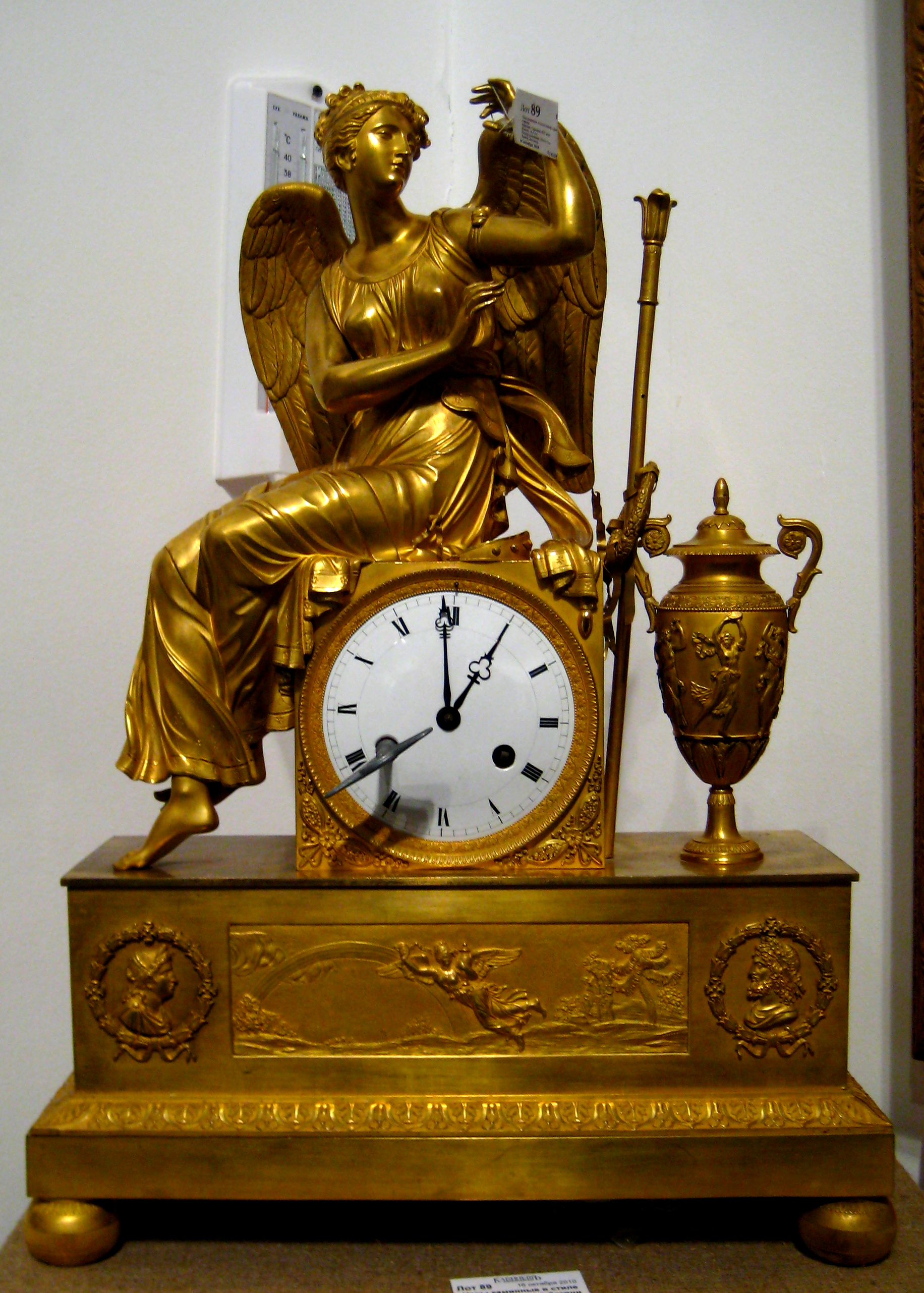
A French clock with Eos.

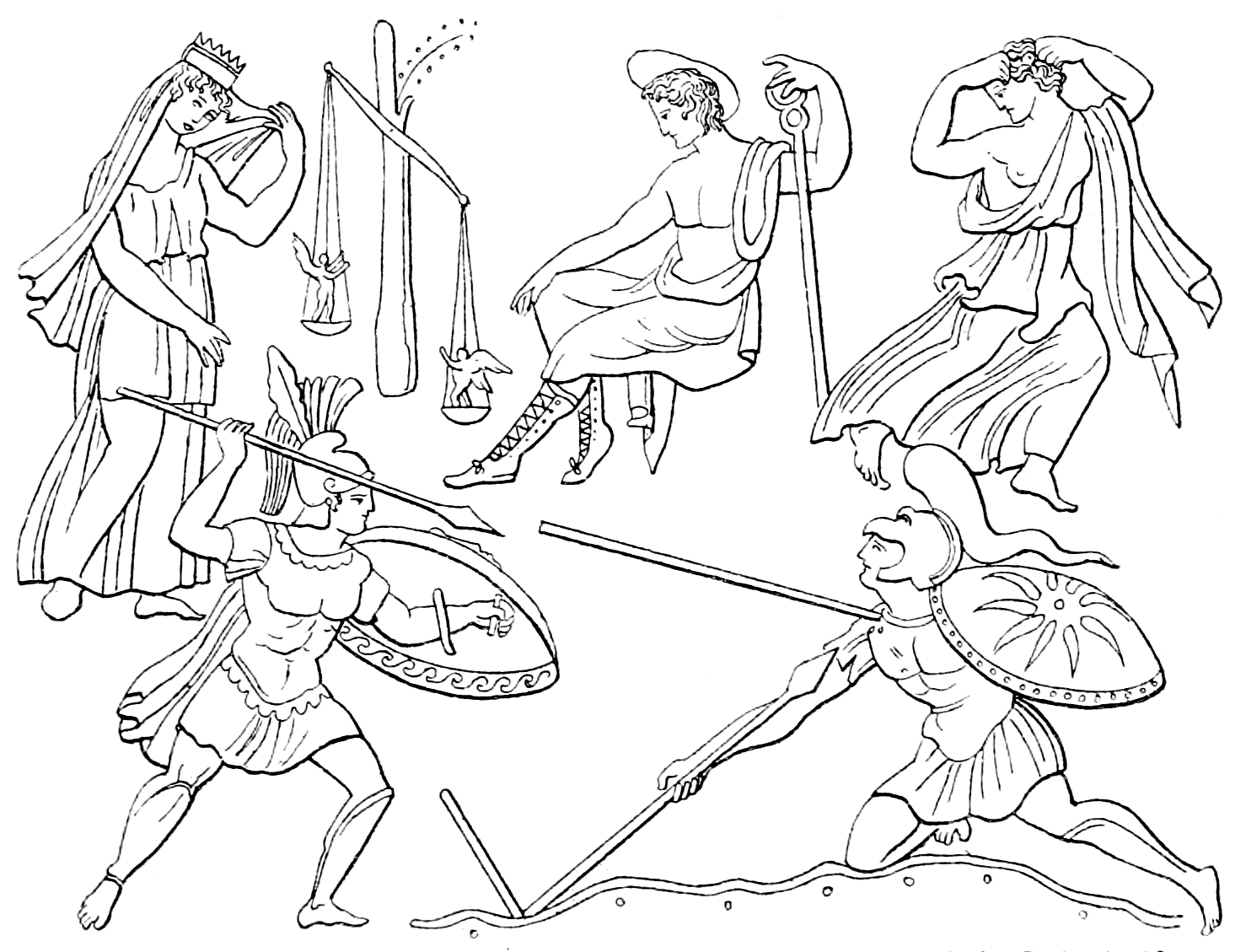
Eos watches the battle between Memnon and Achilles.

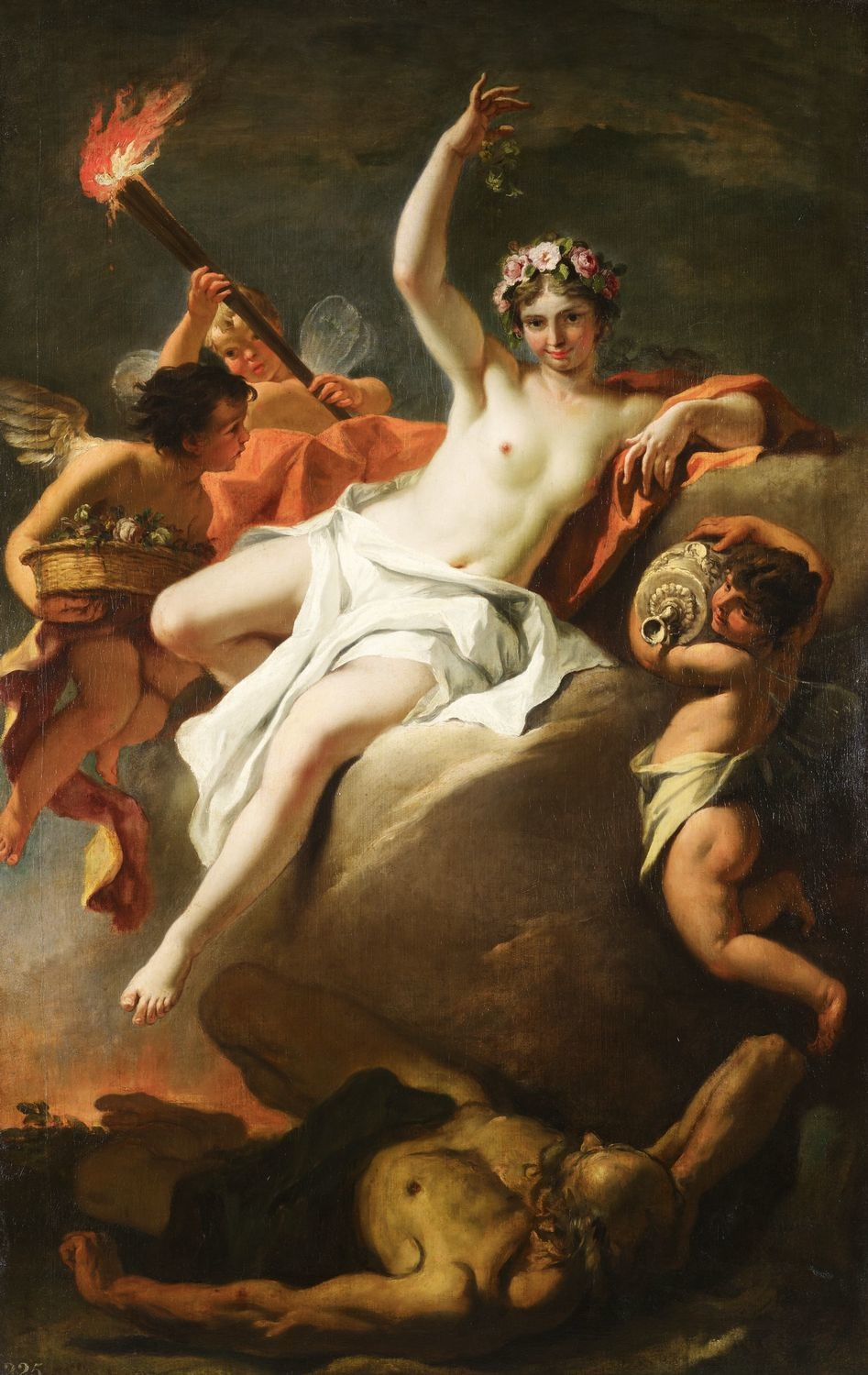
Eos and Tithonus by Sebastiano Ricci.

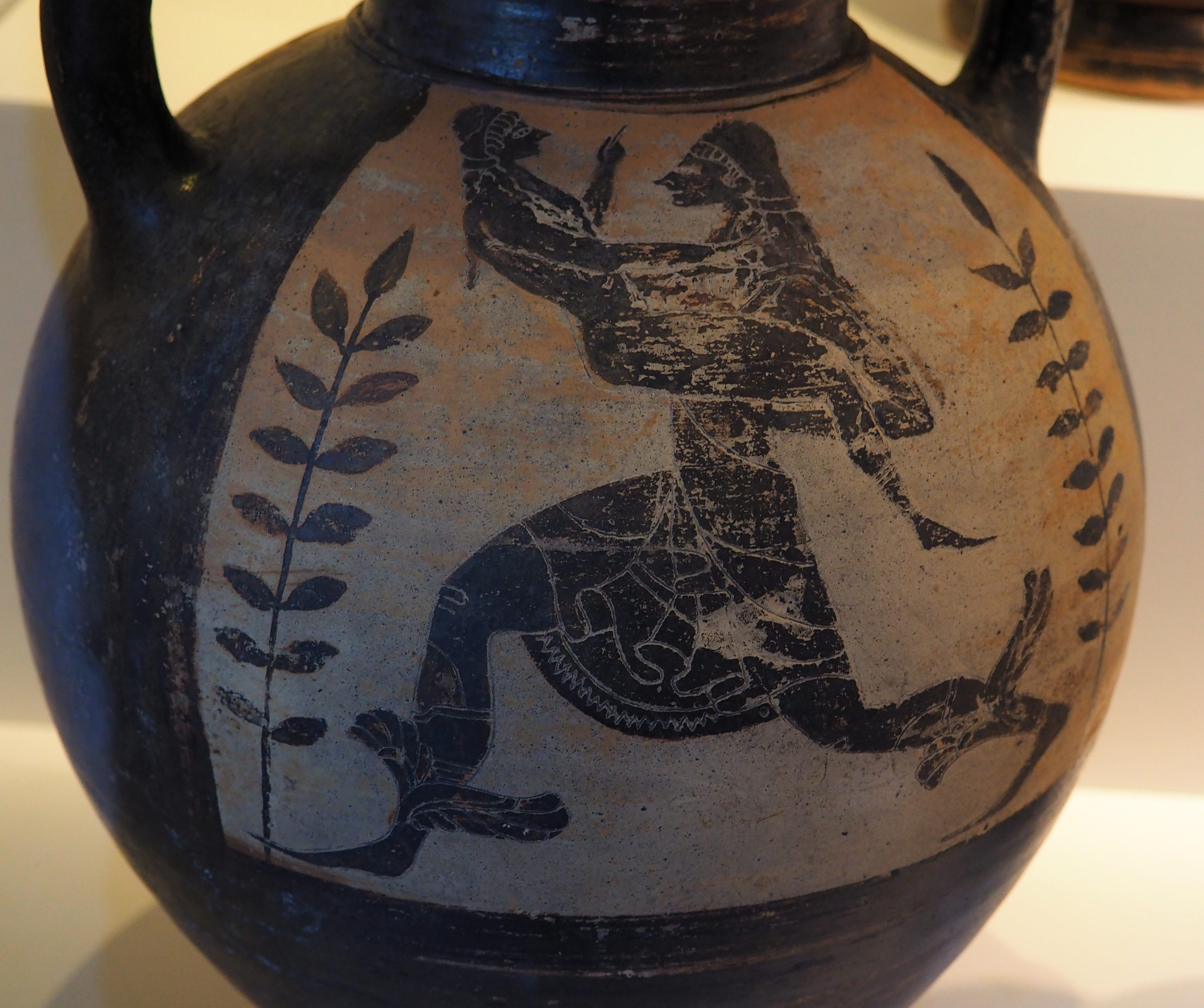
Etruscan vase of Thesan (Eos) abducting Tinthu (Tithonus), circa 525–500 BC.

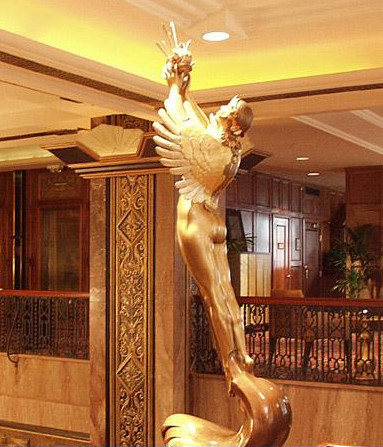
Goddess of Dawn, Jorgen Dreyer (1932)

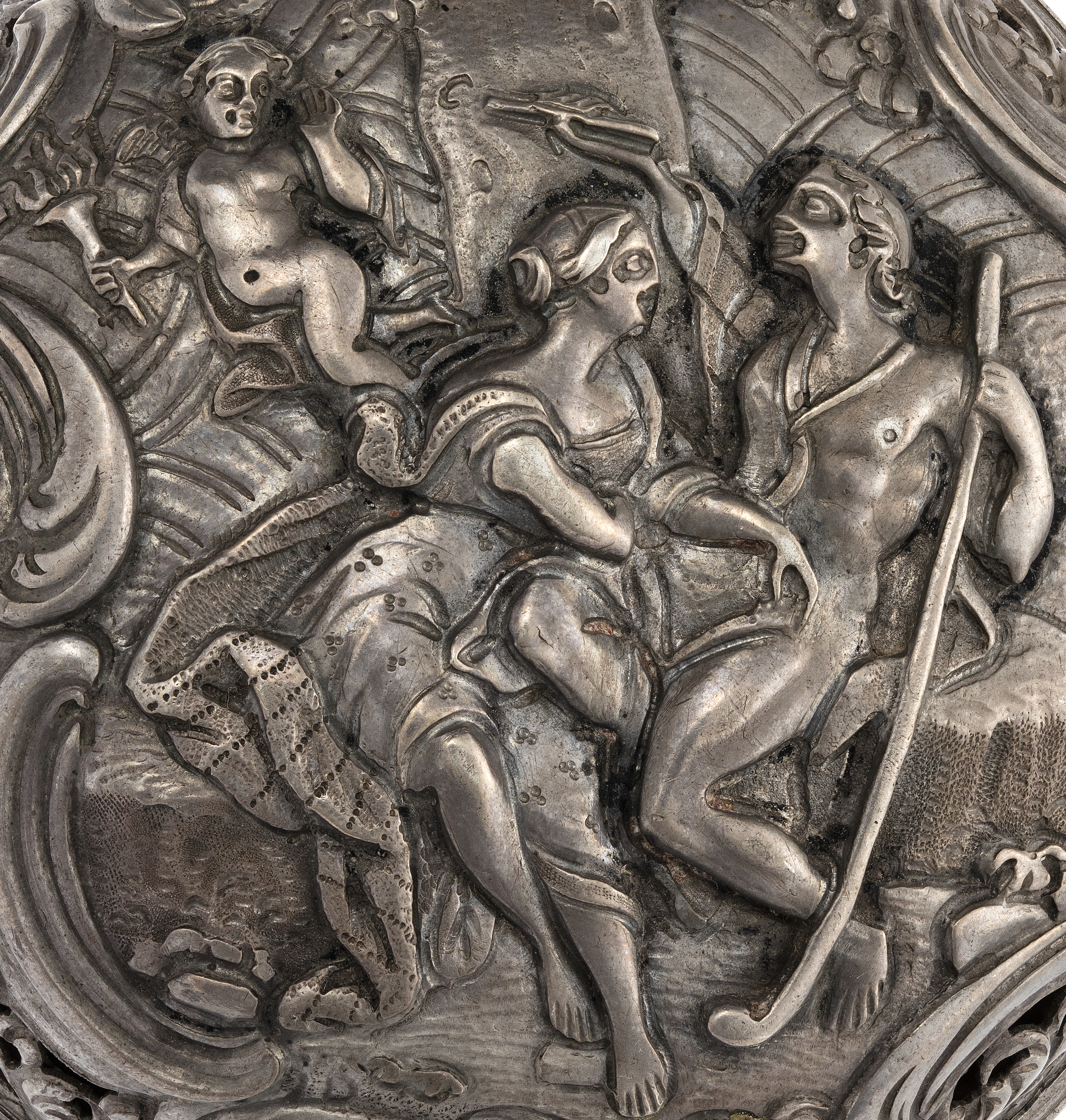
Pocket watch with silver case with Eos and Cephalus (detail), 18th cent.

== Genealogy ==
Eos's family tree

Uranus	Gaia	Pontus
Oceanus	Tethys	Hyperion	Theia	Crius	Eurybia
The Rivers	The Oceanids	Helios	Selene	Eos	Astraeus	Pallas	Perses
The Anemoi	Astraea	The Stars
Cronus	Rhea	Coeus	Phoebe
Hestia	Hera	Hades	Zeus	Leto	Asteria
Demeter	Poseidon
Iapetus	Clymene (or Asia)	Mnemosyne	(Zeus)	Themis
Atlas	Menoetius	Prometheus	Epimetheus	The Muses	The Horae

== See also ==
- Aquarius
- Cumaean Sibyl, a mortal who was granted an extended lifetime but not eternal youth
- List of solar deities

== Bibliography ==
=== Primary sources ===
- Antoninus Liberalis, The Metamorphoses of Antoninus Liberalis translated by Francis Celoria (Routledge 1992). Online version at the Topos Text Project.
- Aratus Solensis, Phaenomena translated by G. R. Mair. Loeb Classical Library Volume 129. London: William Heinemann, 1921. Online version at the Topos Text Project.
- Aratus Solensis, Phaenomena. G. R. Mair. London: William Heinemann; New York: G.P. Putnam's Sons. 1921. Greek text available at the Perseus Digital Library.
- Diodorus Siculus, The Library of History translated by Charles Henry Oldfather. Twelve volumes. Loeb Classical Library. Cambridge, Massachusetts: Harvard University Press; London: William Heinemann, Ltd. 1989. Vol. 3. Books 4.59–8. Online version at Bill Thayer's Web Site
- Diodorus Siculus, Bibliotheca Historica. Vol 1-2. Immanel Bekker. Ludwig Dindorf. Friedrich Vogel. in aedibus B. G. Teubneri. Leipzig. 1888–1890. Greek text available at the Perseus Digital Library.
- Gaius Julius Hyginus, Astronomica from The Myths of Hyginus translated and edited by Mary Grant. University of Kansas Publications in Humanistic Studies. Online version at the Topos Text Project.
- Gaius Julius Hyginus, Fabulae from The Myths of Hyginus translated and edited by Mary Grant. University of Kansas Publications in Humanistic Studies. Online version at the Topos Text Project.
- Gaius Valerius Flaccus, Argonautica translated by Mozley, J H. Loeb Classical Library Volume 286. Cambridge, MA, Harvard University Press; London, William Heinemann Ltd. 1928. Online version at theoi.com.
- Gaius Valerius Flaccus, Argonauticon. Otto Kramer. Leipzig. Teubner. 1913. Latin text available at the Perseus Digital Library.
- Hesiod, Theogony from The Homeric Hymns and Homerica with an English Translation by Hugh G. Evelyn-White, Cambridge, MA., Harvard University Press; London, William Heinemann Ltd. 1914. Online version at the Perseus Digital Library. Greek text available from the same website.
- Homer, The Iliad with an English Translation by A.T. Murray, Ph.D. in two volumes. Cambridge, MA., Harvard University Press; London, William Heinemann, Ltd. 1924. Online version at the Perseus Digital Library.
- Homer, Homeri Opera in five volumes. Oxford, Oxford University Press. 1920. Greek text available at the Perseus Digital Library.
- Homer, The Odyssey with an English Translation by A.T. Murray, Ph.D. in two volumes. Cambridge, MA., Harvard University Press; London, William Heinemann, Ltd. 1919. Online version at the Perseus Digital Library. Greek text available from the same website.
- Homeric Hymns, Homeric Apocrypha, Lives of Homer, edited and translated by Martin L. West, the Loeb Classical Library 496, Harvard University Press, 2003, London, England, ISBN 0-674-99606-2.
- Mimnermus in Greek Elegiac Poetry: From the Seventh to the Fifth Centuries BC, edited and translated by Douglas E. Gerber, Loeb Classical Library No. 258, Cambridge, Massachusetts, Harvard University Press, 1999. ISBN 978-0-674-99582-6. Online version at Harvard University Press.
- Nonnus of Panopolis, Dionysiaca translated by William Henry Denham Rouse (1863–1950), from the Loeb Classical Library, Cambridge, MA, Harvard University Press, 1940. Online version at the Topos Text Project.
- Nonnus of Panopolis, Dionysiaca. 3 Vols. W.H.D. Rouse. Cambridge, MA., Harvard University Press; London, William Heinemann, Ltd. 1940–1942. Greek text available at the Perseus Digital Library.
- Pausanias, Description of Greece with an English Translation by W.H.S. Jones, Litt.D., and H.A. Ormerod, M.A., in 4 Volumes. Cambridge, MA, Harvard University Press; London, William Heinemann Ltd. 1918. Online version at the Perseus Digital Library
- Pausanias, Graeciae Descriptio. 3 vols. Leipzig, Teubner. 1903. Greek text available at the Perseus Digital Library.
- Pindar, Odes translated by Diane Arnson Svarlien. 1990. Online version at the Perseus Digital Library.
- Pindar, The Odes of Pindar including the Principal Fragments with an Introduction and an English Translation by Sir John Sandys, Litt.D., FBA. Cambridge, MA., Harvard University Press; London, William Heinemann Ltd. 1937. Greek text available at the Perseus Digital Library.
- Pseudo-Apollodorus, The Library with an English Translation by Sir James George Frazer, F.B.A., F.R.S. in 2 Volumes, Cambridge, MA, Harvard University Press; London, William Heinemann Ltd. 1921. Online version at the Perseus Digital Library. Greek text available from the same website.
- Propertius, Elegies in Roman Erotic Elegy: Selections from Tibullus, Propertius, Ovid, and Sulpicia, translated, with an Introduction, Notes, and Glossary by Jon Corelis (Salzburg Studies in English Literature Poetic Drama & Poetic Theory 128). Full text available online at romanelegyonline Archived 2021-10-23 at the Wayback Machine.
- Publius Ovidius Naso, Fasti translated by James G. Frazer. Online version at the Topos Text Project.
- Publius Ovidius Naso, Fasti. Sir James George Frazer. London; Cambridge, MA. William Heinemann Ltd.; Harvard University Press. 1933. Latin text available at the Perseus Digital Library.
- Publius Ovidius Naso, Metamorphoses translated by Brookes More (1859–1942). Boston, Cornhill Publishing Co. 1922. Online version at the Perseus Digital Library.
- Publius Ovidius Naso, Metamorphoses. Hugo Magnus. Gotha (Germany). Friedr. Andr. Perthes. 1892. Latin text available at the Perseus Digital Library.
- Quintus Smyrnaeus, The Fall of Troy translated by Way. A. S. Loeb Classical Library Volume 19. London: William Heinemann, 1913. Online version at theoi.com
- Quintus Smyrnaeus, The Fall of Troy. Arthur S. Way. London: William Heinemann; New York: G.P. Putnam's Sons. 1913. Greek text available at the Perseus Digital Library.
- The Homeric Hymns and Homerica with an English Translation by Hugh G. Evelyn-White. Homeric Hymns. Cambridge, MA., Harvard University Press; London, William Heinemann Ltd. 1914. Online version at the Perseus Digital Library. Greek text available from the same website.

=== Secondary sources ===
- Athanassakis, Apostolos N., and Benjamin M. Wolkow, The Orphic Hymns, Johns Hopkins University Press; owlerirst Printing edition (May 29, 2013). ISBN 978-1-4214-0882-8. Google Books.
- Bell, Robert E. (1991). Women of Classical Mythology: A Biographical Dictionary. ABC-Clio. ISBN 9780874365818.
- Burkert, Walter (1982), Greek Religion.
- Cohen, Beth (2006). "Outline as a Special Technique in Black- and Red-figure Vase-painting". The Colors of Clay: Special Techniques in Athenian Vases. Getty Publications. ISBN 978-0-89236-942-3.
- Campbell, David A., Greek Lyric, Volume I: Sappho and Alcaeus, Loeb Classical Library No. 142, Cambridge, Massachusetts, Harvard University Press, 1990. ISBN 0-674-99157-5. Online version at Harvard University Press.
- Corinne Ondine Pache, A Moment's Ornament: The Poetics of Nympholepsy in Ancient Greece. Oxford University Press, 2011. ISBN 978-0-19-533936-9
- Currie, Bruno, Pindar and the Cult of Heroes, Oxford University Press, 2005, ISBN 978-0-19-927724-7. Google books.
- Cyrino, Monica S. (2010), Aphrodite, Gods and Heroes of the Ancient World, New York and London: Routledge, ISBN 978-0-415-77523-6. Google books.
- Davidson, James, "Time and Greek Religion", in A Companion to Greek Religion, edited by Daniel Ogden, John Wiley & Sons, 2010, ISBN 9781444334173.
- Dickmann-Boedeker, Deborah (1974). Aphrodite's Entry Into Greek Epic. Leiden, the Netherlands: Brill Publications. ISBN 90-04-03946-5.
- Dumézil, Georges (1934), Ouranos-Vàruna: Ètude de mythologie compáree indo-européene, Paris: Maisonneuve.
- Ferrari, Gloria, Alcman and the Cosmos of Sparta, University of Chicago Press, 2008, ISBN 978-0-226-66867-3.
- Grimal, Pierre, The Dictionary of Classical Mythology, Wiley-Blackwell, 1996, ISBN 978-0-631-20102-1. "Eos" p. 146
- Greene, Ellen; Paxton, Joseph, Reading Sappho: Contemporary Approaches, University of California Press, 1996, ISBN 0-520-20195-7.
- Hansen, William, Handbook of Classical Mythology, ABC-CLIO, 2004. ISBN 978-1576072264.
- Jackson, Peter (2002). "Light from Distant Asterisks. Towards a Description of the Indo-European Religious Heritage". Numen. 49 (1): 61–102. doi:10.1163/15685270252772777. ISSN 0029-5973. JSTOR 3270472.
- Janda, Michael (2010), Die Musik nach dem Chaos: der Schöpfungsmythos der europäischen Vorzeit, Innsbruck: Institut für Sprachen und Literaturen, ISBN 978-3851242270
- Keightley, Thomas, The Mythology of Ancient Greece and Italy, G. Bell and Sons, 1877.
- Kerenyi, Karl (1951). The Gods of the Greeks. Thames and Hudson.
- Kölligan, Daniel (2007). "Aphrodite of the Dawn: Indo-European Heritage in Greek Divine Epithets and Theonyms". Letras Clássicas. 11 (11): 105–34. doi:10.11606/issn.2358-3150.v0i11p105-134.
- Mallory, James P.; Adams, Douglas Q. (1997). Encyclopedia of Indo-European Culture. London: Routledge. ISBN 978-1-884964-98-5.
- Meagher, Robert E., The Meaning of Helen: In Search of an Ancient Icon, Bolchazy-Carducci Publishers, 2002. ISBN 9780865165106.
- Miller, Gary (2014). Ancient Greek Dialects and Early Authors: Introduction to the Dialect Mixture in Homer, with Notes on Lyric and Herodotus. De Gruyter. ISBN 978-1-61451-493-0.
- Nagy, Gregory, Greek Mythology and Poetics, Cornell University Press, 1990, ISBN 0-8014-8048-5.
- Oakley, John H.; Palagia, Olga, Athenian Potters and Painters Volume II, Oxbow Books, 2009, ISBN 978-1-84217-350-3. Google books.
- Picón, Carlos A.; Hemingway, Seán, Pergamon and the Hellenistic Kingdoms of the Ancient World, Yale University Press, 2016, ISBN 978-1-58839-587-0.
- Price, Jonathan J.; Zelnick-Abramovitz, Rachel, Text and Intertext in Greek Epic and Drama: Essays in Honor of Margalit Finkelberg, Routledge, 2021, ISBN 978-0-367-11063-5. Google books.
- Reitzammer, Laurialan, The Athenian Adonia in Context: The Adonis Festival as Cultural Practice. University of Wisconsin Press, 2016. ISBN 9780299308209
- Roberts, Helene E., Encyclopedia of Comparative Iconography: Themes Depicted in Works of Art. Volume I and II, Fitzroy Dearborn Publishers, London, Chicago, 1998. ISBN 1-57958-009-2
- Savignoni L. 1899. "On Representations of Helios and of Selene", The Journal of Hellenic Studies 19: pp. 265–272.
- Schmidt, Evamaria, The Great Altar of Pergamon, 1962, Edition Leipzig.
- Smith, William; Dictionary of Greek and Roman Biography and Mythology, London (1873). John Murray: printed by Spottiswoode and Co., New-Street Square and Parliament Street.
- Stoll, Heinrich Wilhelm, Handbook of the religion and mythology of the Greeks, With a Short Account of The Religious System of the Romans, tr. by R.B. Paul, and ed. by T.K. Arnold, London, Francis & John Rivington, 1852.
- Tsagalis Christos; Markantonatos Andreas, The Winnowing Oar - New Perspectives in Homeric Studies, De Gruyter, German National Library, 2017, ISBN 978-3-11-054335-3.
- Walters, Henry Beauchamp, History of ancient pottery, Greek, Etruscan, and Roman volume II, based on the work of Samuel Birch, 1905, London, J. Murray, New York.
- West, M. L. (2000), "The Name of Aphrodite", Glotta, 76 (1./2. H), Göttingen, Germany: Vandenhoeck & Ruprecht (GmbH & Co. KG): 134–38, JSTOR 40267103
