= Cephalus (son of Hermes) =

Figure from Greek mythology

In Greek mythology, Cephalus (/ˈsɛfələs/; Ancient Greek: Κέφαλος, Képhalos) was a member of the Athenian royal family as the son of Princess Herse and Hermes.

== Family ==
In some accounts, Cephalus was said to be the son of Hermes by Creusa or of Pandion I. According to Apollodorus, Cephalus was loved by Eos and carried off to Syria, where they had a son named Tithonus, who had a son named Phaethon, who had a son named Astynous, who had a son named Sandocus.
