= Nephalia =

Type of Hellenic religious offerings

In the Hellenic religion, nephalia (Ancient Greek: νηφάλια, nēphália, 'calm'; Ancient Greek pronunciation: [neː.pʰá.li.a]) was the religious name for libations, in which wine was not offered or the use of wine was explicitly forbidden. Liquids, such as water, milk, honey or oil in any combination, were used with a mixture of honey and water or milk (μελίκρατον, melíkraton), being one of the most common nēphália offerings. Nephalia were performed as both independent rituals and in conjunction with other sacrifices, such as animal sacrifices. The use of nēphália is documented in the works of Aeschylus and Porphyry.

== Etymology ==
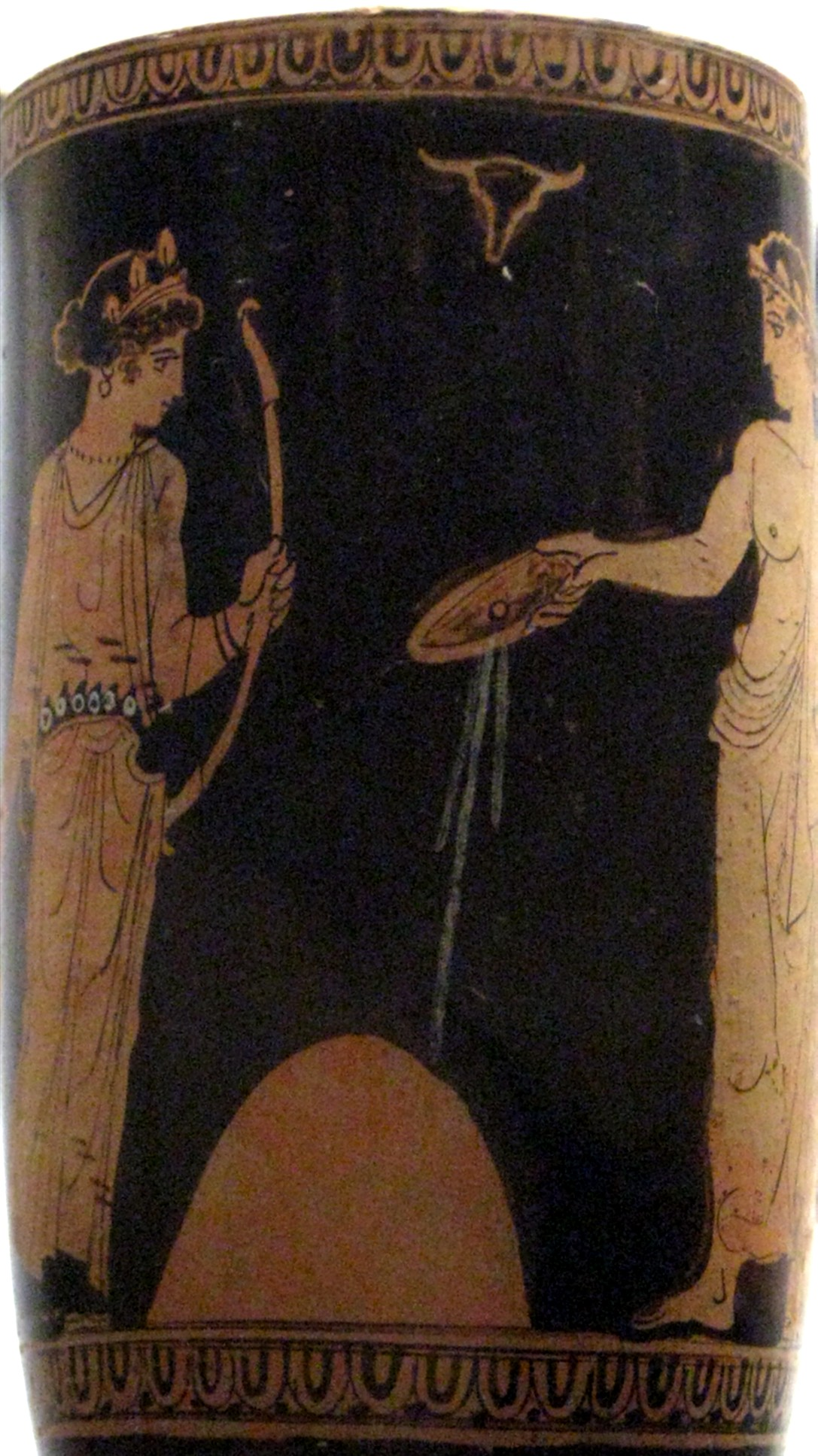
Apollo pouring a libation from a phiale onto the omphalos, with his sister Artemis attending; a bucranium hangs above

Nephalia (Ancient Greek: νηφάλια, nēfália, 'calm') is believed to originate from nēfálios (νηφάλιος), itself derived from the verb nḗphō (νήφω), meaning to be sober or to drink no wine (and, by extension, to be self-controlled).

The term nephalism in English dates back to 1862, referring to the practice of completely abstaining from all alcohol. The verb nēphalieúō (νηφαλιεύω) means to offer nephalia libations, as in alcohol-free offerings.

There is a documented history of honey-based libations (μελίσπονδα, melísponda), including libations of mead (μέθυ, méthy) or other honey-based drinks (μελίτειον, melíteion).

== Libations in Ancient Greece ==
Spondê (Ancient Greek: σπονδή, [spondɛ̌ː]) was a central and vital aspect of ancient Greek religion, and one of the simplest and most common forms of religious practice. It is one of the basic religious acts which defined piety in ancient Greek culture, dating back to the Bronze Age and even prehistoric Greece. Libations were a part of daily life, and the pious might perform them every day in the morning and evening, as well as to begin meals. A libation most often consisted of mixed wine and water, but could also be unmixed wine, honey, oil, water, or milk.

The typical form of libation, spondȇ, is the ritualized pouring of wine from a jug or bowl held in the hand. The most common ritual was to pour the liquid from an oinochoē into a phiale. After the wine was poured from the phiale, the remainder of the oinochoē's contents were drunk by the celebrant. A libation was poured any time wine was to be drunk, a practice which was recorded as early as the Homeric epics. The etiquette of the symposium required that when the first bowl (krater) of wine was served, a libation was made to Zeus and the Olympian gods. Heroes received a libation from the second krater served, and Zeús Téleios (Ζεύς Tέλειος, lit. 'Zeus who Finishes') from the third, which was supposed to be the last. An alternative practice offered a libation from the first bowl to the Agathos Daimon and from the third bowl to Hermes. An individual at the symposium could also make an invocation of and libation to a god of his choice.

Libation generally accompanied prayer. The Greeks stood when they prayed, either with their arms uplifted or in the act of libation with the right arm extended to hold the phiale.

In animal sacrifice, wine is poured onto the offered animal as part of the ritual sacrifice and preparation, and then onto the ash and flames. Such scenes are commonly depicted in Greek art, including either the sacrificers or the gods themselves holding the phiale.

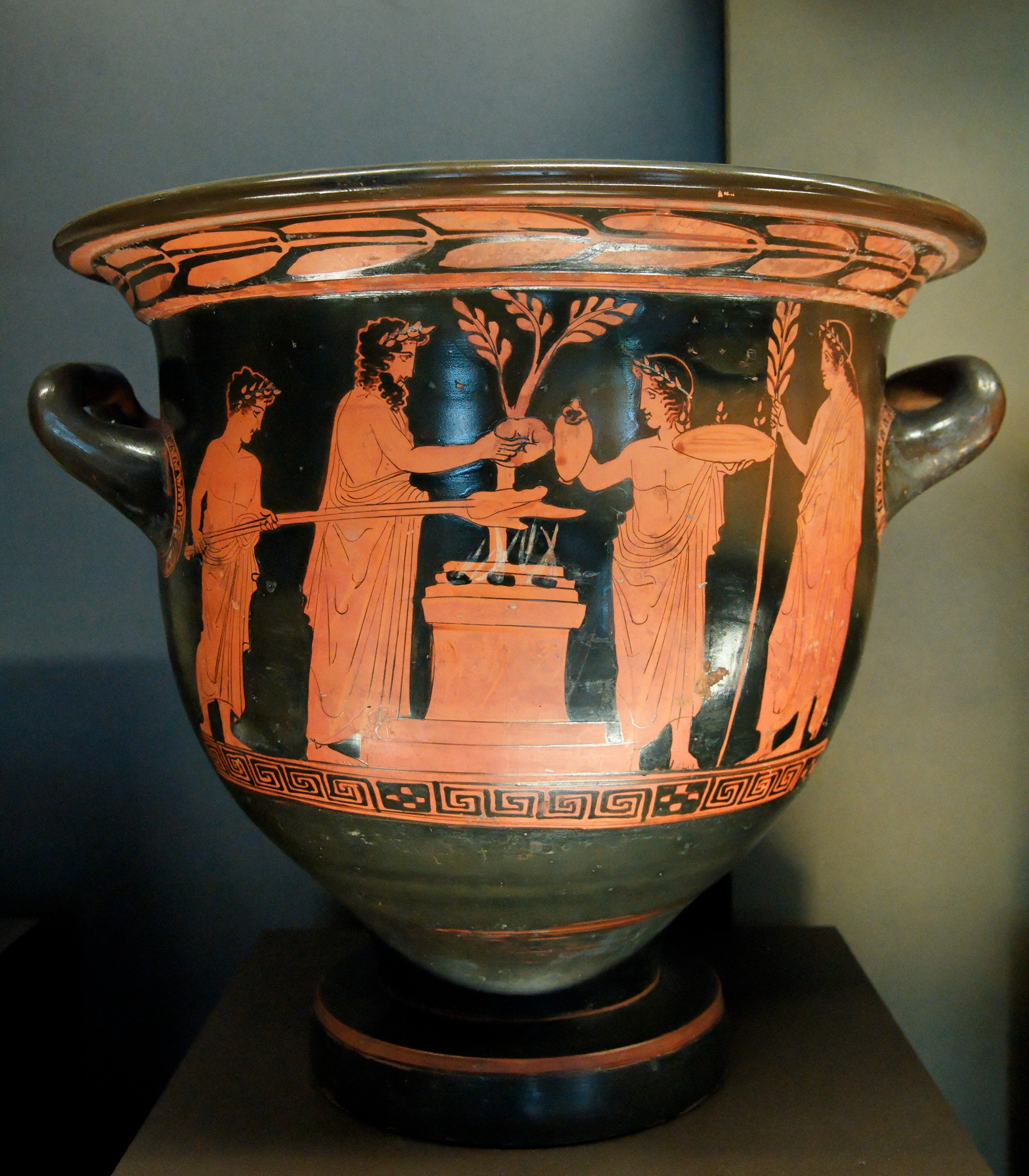
Scene of sacrifice, with a libation poured from a jug (Pothos Painter, Attic red-figure krater, 430–420 BC)

The Greek verb spéndō (σπένδω), meaning 'pour a libation' or 'conclude a pact', derives from the Indo-European root *spend-, 'make an offering, perform a rite, engage oneself by a ritual act'. The noun form, spondȇ (plural: spondaí), simply means 'libation'. In the middle voice, the verb means 'enter into an agreement', in the sense that the gods are called to guarantee action. While blood sacrifice was performed to begin a war; spondaí marked the conclusion of hostilities and is often thus used to mean 'armistice, treaty'. The formula "we the polis have made libation" was a declaration of peace or the "Truce of God," which was observed also when the various city-states came together for the Panhellenic Games, the Olympic Games, or the festivals of the Eleusinian Mysteries. This form of libation is "bloodless, gentle, irrevocable, and final."

Libations poured onto the earth were intended as offerings for the dead and the chthonic gods. In the Nekyia (Book 11) in the Odyssey, Odysseus digs an offering pit around which he pours in order honey, wine, and water. For the form of libation called choē (χεῦμα, cheuma, 'that which is poured'; from IE *gheu-), a larger vessel is tipped over and emptied onto the ground for the chthonic gods, who may also receive spondaic libations. Divined mortals might receive blood libations if they had participated in the bloodshed of war, for instance Brasidas the Spartan. In rituals of caring for the dead at their tombs, libations would include milk and honey.

The Libation Bearers is the English title of the center tragedy from the Orestes Trilogy of Aeschylus, in reference to the offerings Electra brings to the tomb of her dead father Agamemnon. Sophocles gives one of the most detailed descriptions of libation in Greek literature in Oedipus at Colonus, performed as atonement in the grove of the Eumenides:

First, water is fetched from a freshly flowing spring; cauldrons which stand in the sanctuary are garlanded with wool and filled with water and honey; turning towards the east, the sacrificer tips the vessels towards the west; the olive branches which he has been holding in his hand he now strews on the ground at the place where the earth has drunk in the libation; and with a silent prayer he departs, not looking back.

Hero of Alexandria described a method of constructing "an altar such that, when a fire is raised on it, figures at the side shall offer libations", the mechanism being the forcing of liquid through pipes in the figures by the expansion of the air inside the altar when heated by the fire.
