= Trompe-l'œil (mural) =

Artwork by Maria Bettina Cogliatti

Coordinates: 47.16968°N 8.5138°E

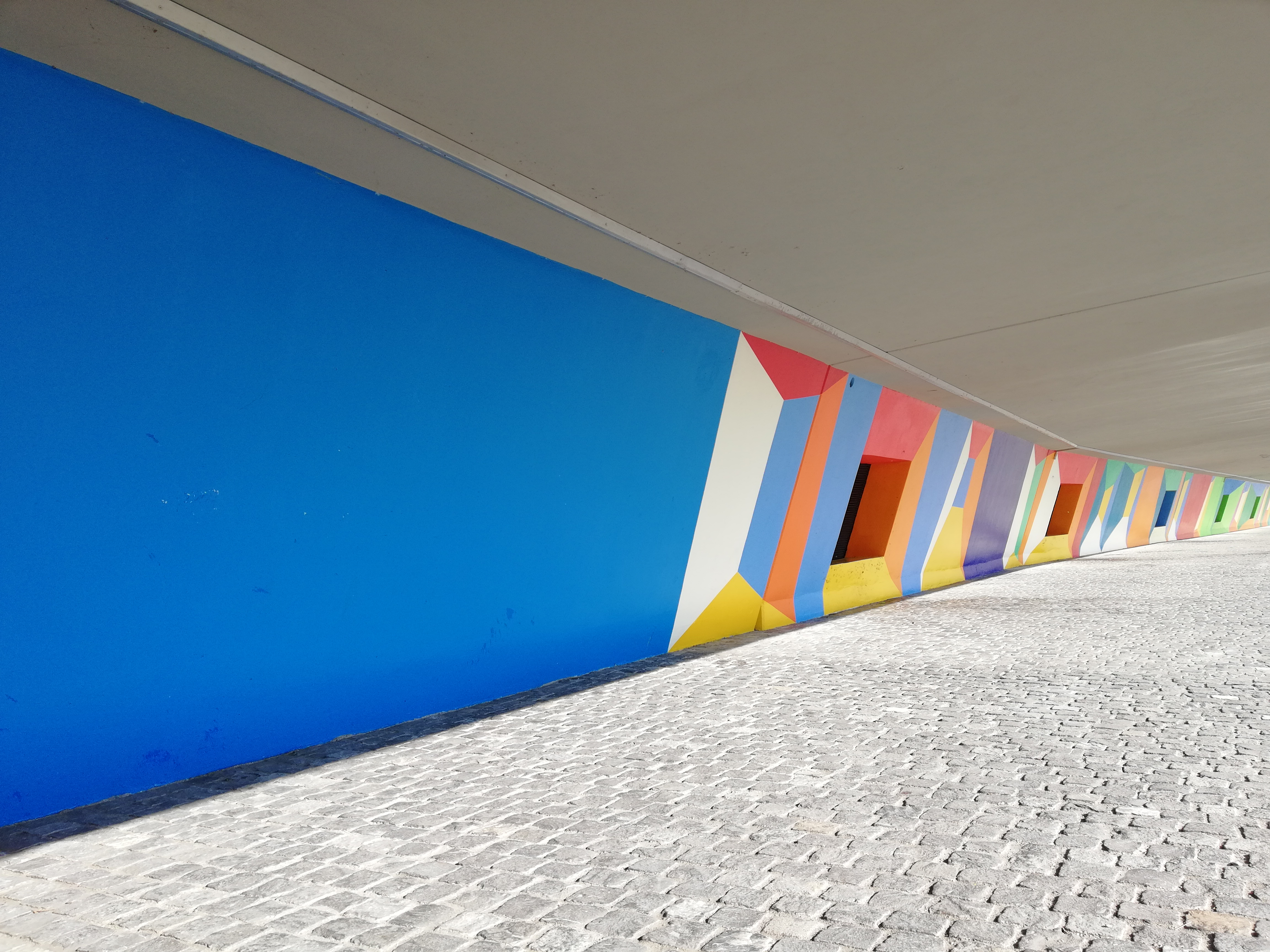
- The mural in April 2019
- Artist: M. B. Cogliatti
- Year: 1998
- Type: Mural
- Medium: acrylic paint
- Movement: Color field
- Designation: On behalf of the municipal government of Zug
- Condition: Renovated
- Location: Zug

Trompe-l'œil is a 112-meter-long color field painting created in 1998 by Maria Bettina Cogliatti. It overlooks the Katastrophenbucht ("disaster bay") in Zug, Switzerland.

== Description ==
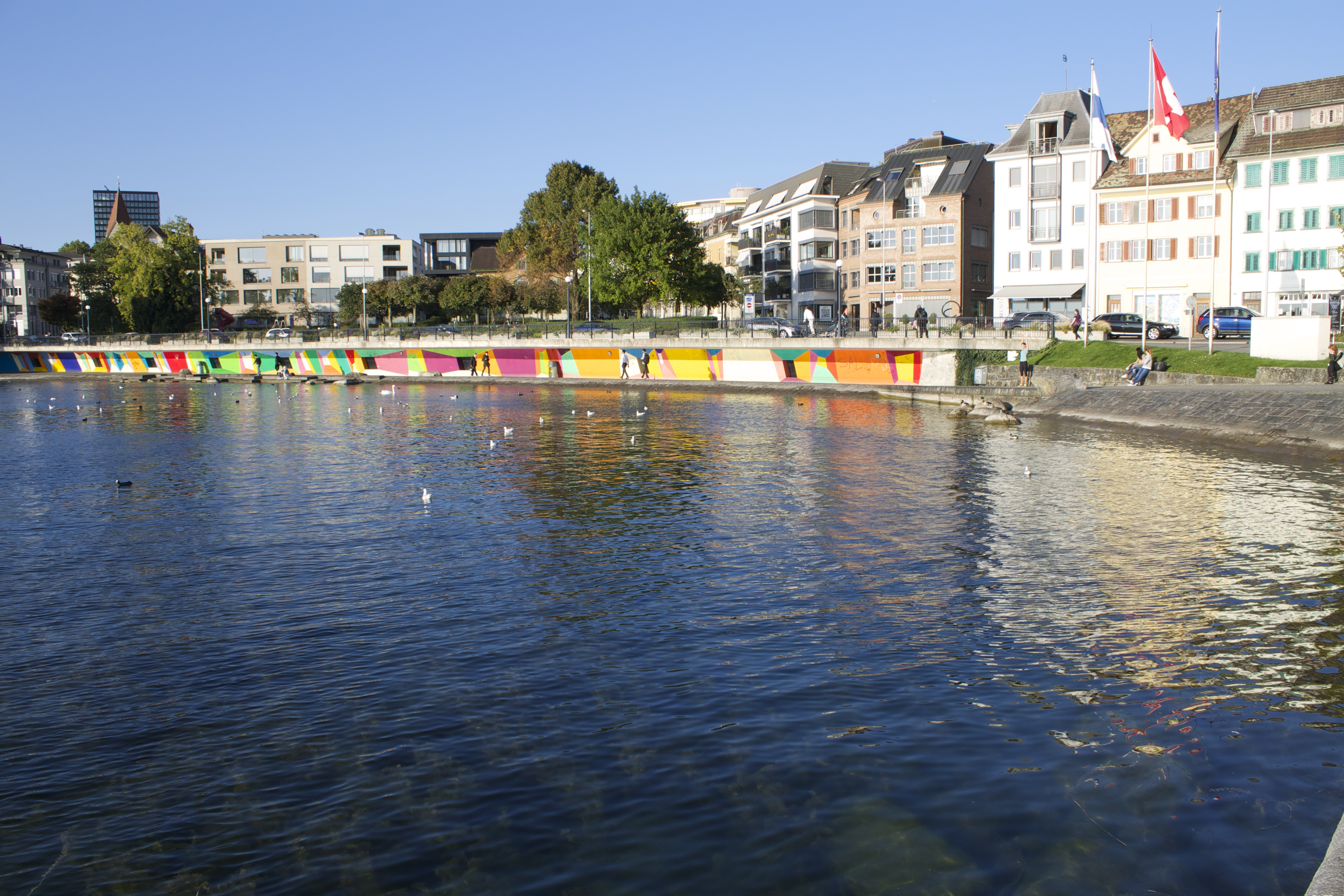
Trompe-l'œil and the Katastrophenbucht, from Rigiecke park

Cogliatti painted Trompe-l'œil in 1998 with acrylic paint on the concrete wall of the Zug Vorstadtbrücke bridge.

In this artwork, she juxtaposed three warm and two cold color fields (or vice versa). 21 color tones are set in contrast to one another in such a way that the colors run from warm yellow-orange on the side of the Vorstadtquai to rich purple, green and red, and finally towards the Alpenquai into a cool blue. Thus, they simulate a colored sky, from dusk to dawn. Cogliatti arranged the colored surfaces in order to create illusionistic interruptions, niches and windows in the wall and thus create an imaginary living space, a “colorful city”.

Trompe-l'œil complements the color of the colorful Vorstadt houses that are still standing (since the 1887 Vorstadtkatastrophe) and thus brings the sunken row of houses to new life. "The colorful reflections from the wall to the ceiling and to the floor create an aquarium feeling on hot days ..." The sequence of colors is also reminiscent of the course of the day, from dusk to dawn. "The large open areas on the mural [...] form an ideal platform for various messages." "There is a place in Zug that leads directly into the soul of young people. A kind of physical Facebook [...] - the great colorful wall in the disaster bay, between Rössliwiese and Alpenquai."

== History ==
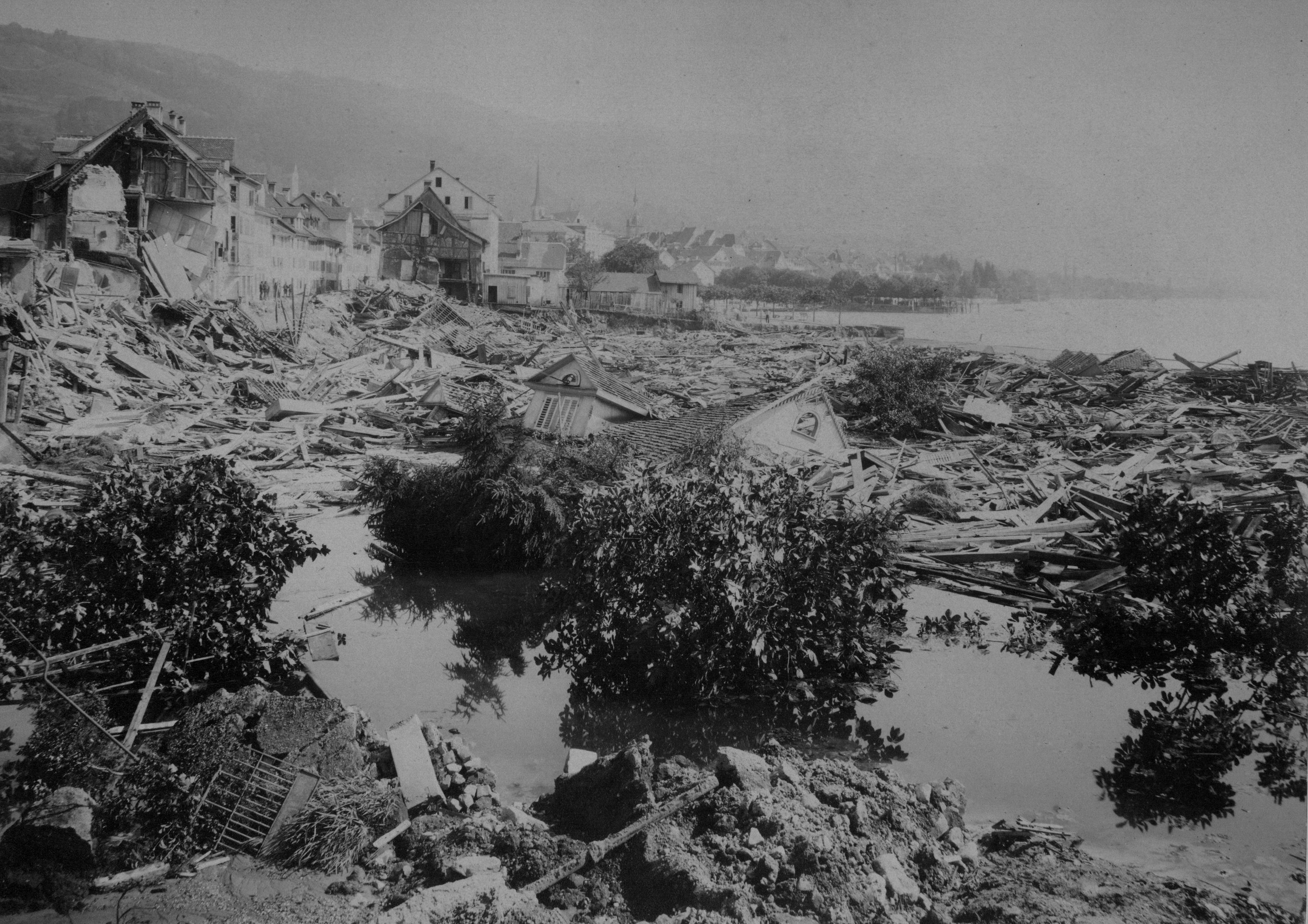
Future site of Trompe-l'œil, immediately after the 1887 disaster (lakeshore collapse) that created the namesake bay

In the 1970s, Hans Potthof painted the 112-meter concrete wall of the Vorstadtbrücke bridge with the assistance of children; but graffiti destroyed the painting during decades.

In 1995, Cogliatti instructed 55 children to paint the same concrete wall on behalf of the Zuger Schul– und Stadtbauamt (″Zug school and municipal building authorities″). The leitmotif theme for the painting work was "Living space", the painting was mainly in shades of blue – allusions to the houses that had sunk into the lake there in 1887. The wall painting was inaugurated on July 6, 1995, one day after the complete renovation of the Rigiplatz above, which is reminiscent of the same disaster.

After the painting had been repeatedly covered in graffiti, the city commissioned Cogliatti to redesign the wall in 1998. With the help of a flat painter and over a period of approximately 140 hours, the artist implemented “her own sculptural and color visions”. One of Cogliatti's artistic goals, among others, was to use painterly techniques to create the impression of a third dimension. She therefore gave her work the name Trompe-l'œil, which means "optical illusion"; for this, the dominance of the window hatches in the wall had to be broken. Cogliatti completed the work in early August 1998.
