= Eos (painting) =

Painting by Evelyn De Morgan

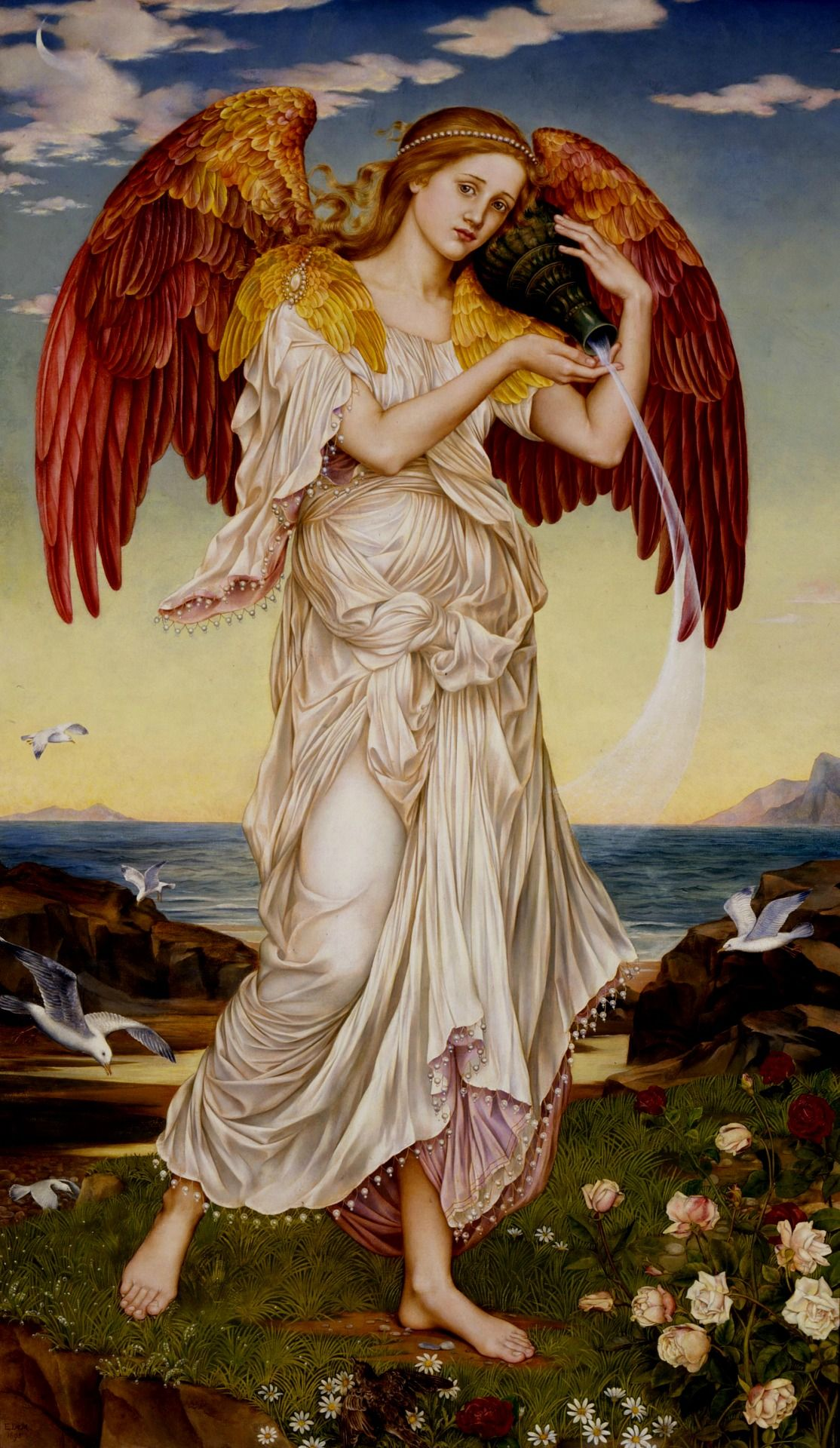
- Artist: Evelyn De Morgan
- Year: 1895
- Medium: Oil on canvas
- Location: Columbia Museum of Art, Columbia

Eos is an oil on canvas painting by the English artist Evelyn De Morgan, from 1895. done in a Pre-Raphaelite style. It is held in the Columbia Museum of Art, in Columbia, South Carolina.

It depicts Eos, Greek goddess of the dawn and of love, standing on a seashore, surrounded by birds and flowers and pouring water from a jug.

== See also ==
- Aurora and Cephalus, a 1733 painting by François Boucher which portrays Aurora, the Roman form of Eos
