= William Scarborough =

William Scarborough may refer to:

- William Scarborough (politician) (born c. 1945), member of the New York State Assembly
- William Harrison Scarborough (1812–1871), American painter
- William Sanders Scarborough (1852–1926), African American classical scholar
- William K. Scarborough, professor of history

== See also ==
- William Scarbrough, American sea captain
