= Dawn =

Time that marks the beginning of twilight before sunrise

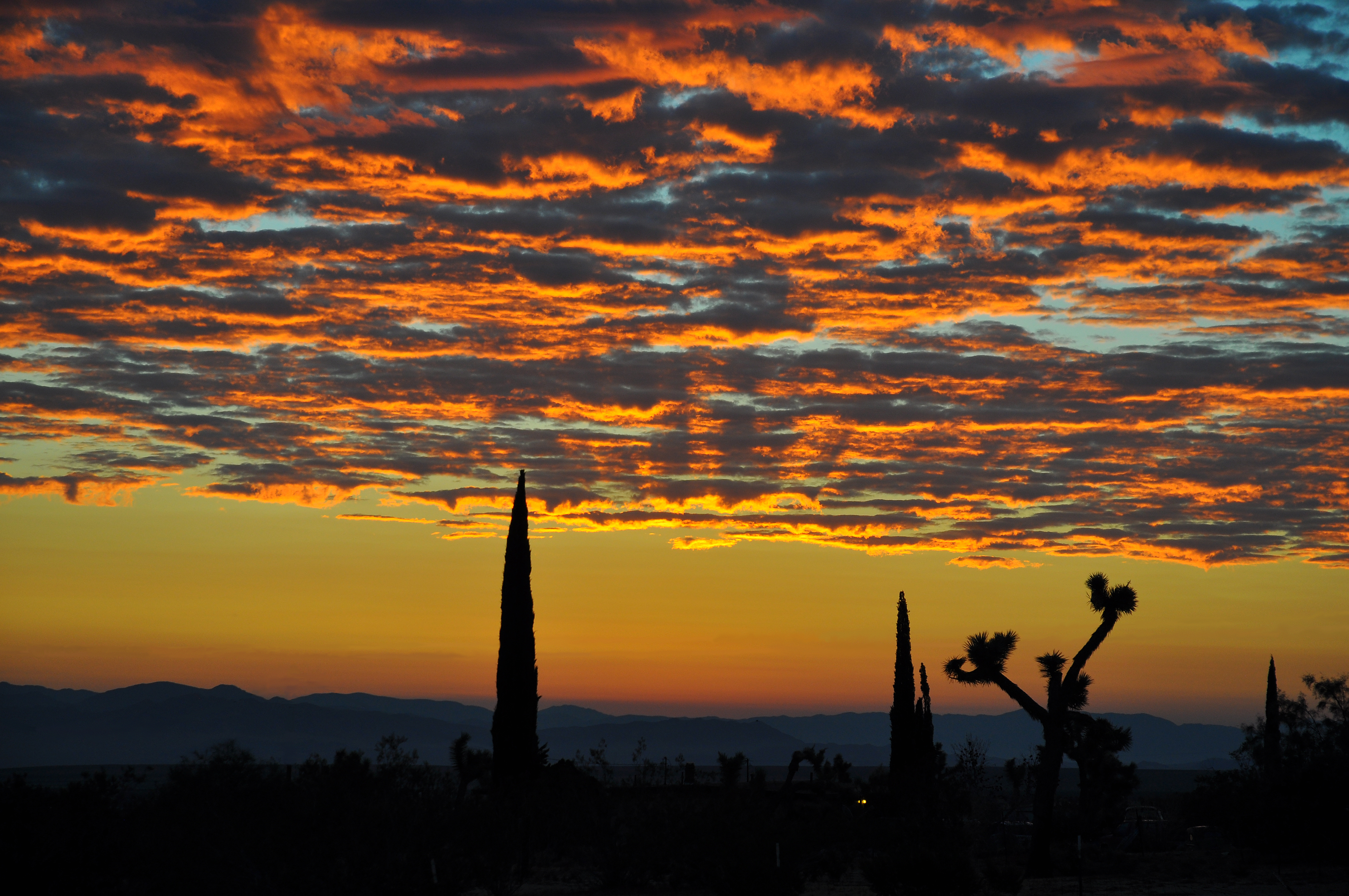
Late summer dawn over the Mojave Desert, California

Dawn is sometimes considered the beginning of morning twilight, the period of twilight, or the time of sunrise.

Dawn is the time that marks the beginning of twilight before sunrise. It is recognized by the appearance of indirect daylight being scattered in Earth's atmosphere, when the centre of the Sun's disc has reached 18° below the observer's horizon. This morning twilight period will last until sunrise (when the Sun's upper limb breaks the horizon), when direct daylight outshines the diffused light.

Civil, nautical, and astronomical dawn, when defined as the beginning time of the corresponding twilight

== Etymology ==
"Dawn" derives from the Old English verb dagian, "to become day".

== Types of dawn ==
Dawn begins with the first sight of lightness in the morning, and continues until the Sun breaks the horizon. The morning twilight is divided in three phases, which are determined by the angular distance of the centre of the Sun (degrees below the horizon) in the morning. These are astronomical, nautical and civil twilight.

=== Astronomical dawn ===
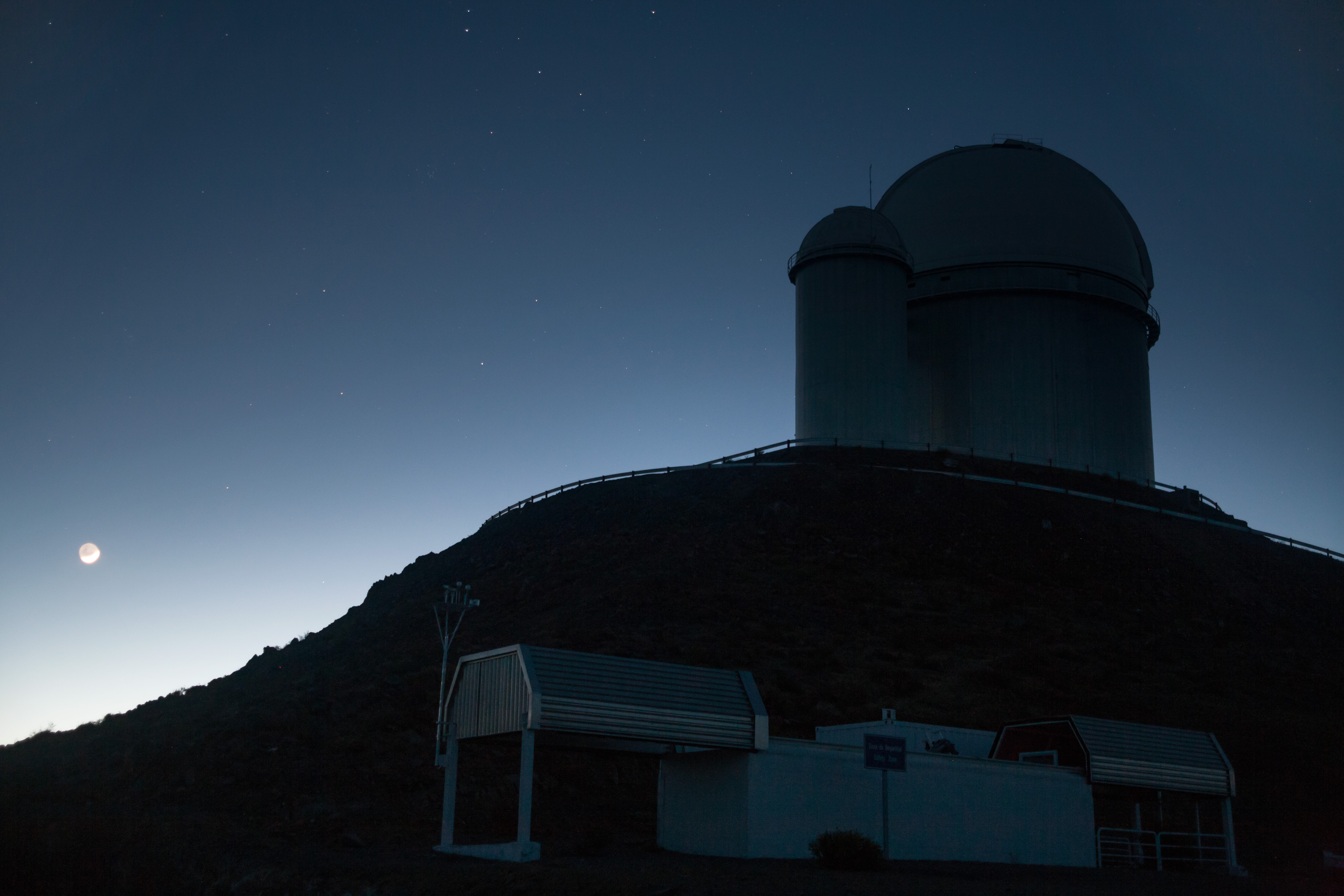
Dawn at La Silla Observatory, Chile

Astronomical dawn begins when the center of the Sun is 18 degrees below the horizon in the morning. Astronomical twilight follows instantly until the center of the Sun is 12 degrees below the horizon. At this point, a very small portion of the Sun's rays illuminate the sky and the fainter stars begin to disappear. Astronomical dawn is often indistinguishable from night, especially in areas with light pollution. Astronomical dawn marks the beginning of astronomical twilight, which lasts until nautical dawn.

=== Nautical dawn ===
Nautical twilight begins when there is enough light for sailors to distinguish the horizon at sea, but the sky is still too dark to perform outdoor activities. It begins when the center of the Sun is 12 degrees below the horizon in the morning. Nautical dawn marks the start of nautical twilight, which lasts until civil dawn.

=== Civil dawn ===
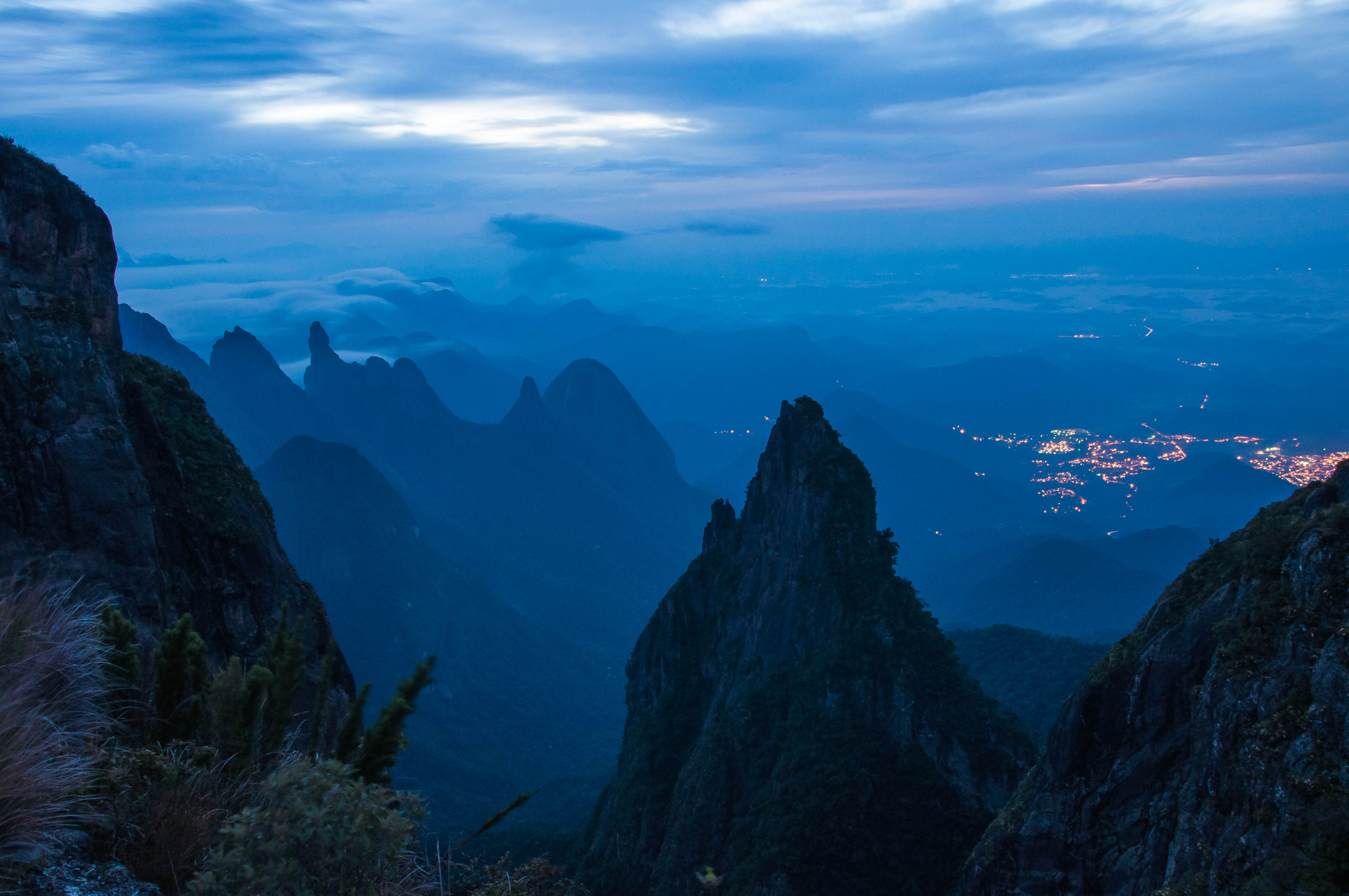
Dawn over Serra dos Órgãos National Park, Rio de Janeiro state, Brazil

Civil dawn begins when there is enough light for most objects to be distinguishable, so that some outdoor activities can commence. It occurs when the center of the Sun is 6 degrees below the horizon in the morning.

When the sky is clear, it is blue colored, and if there are clouds or haze, then bronze, orange and yellow colors are seen. Some bright stars and planets such as Venus and Jupiter are still visible to the naked eye at civil dawn. This moment marks the start of civil twilight, which lasts until sunrise.

== Effects of latitude ==
The duration of the morning twilight (i.e. between astronomical dawn and sunrise) varies greatly depending on the observer's latitude: from a little over 70 minutes at the Equator, to many hours in the polar regions.

== Mythology and religion ==
In Islam, Zodiacal Light is referred to as False Dawn (Al-Fajr Al-Kadhib, Arabic الفجر الكاذب) and Astronomical dawn is called True Dawn (Al-Fajr As-Sadiq, Arabic الفجر الصادق), and it is the time of first prayer of the day, and the beginning of the daily fast during Ramadan.

Many Indo-European mythologies have a dawn goddess, separate from the male Solar deity, her name deriving from PIE *h_{2}ausos-, derivations of which include Greek Eos, Roman Aurora and Indian Ushas. Also related is Lithuanian Aušrinė, and possibly a Germanic *Austrōn- (whence the term Easter).

The Hindu dawn deity Ushas is female, whereas Surya, the Sun, and Aruṇa, the Sun's charioteer, are male. Ushas is one of the most prominent Rigvedic deities. The time of dawn is also referred to as the brahmamuhurta (Brahma is the god of creation and muhurta is a Hindu time of the day), and is considered an ideal time to perform spiritual activities, including meditation and yoga. In some parts of India, both Usha and Pratyusha (dusk) are worshipped along with the Sun during the festival of Chhath.

Jesus in the Bible is often symbolized by dawn in the morning, also when Jesus rose on the third day it happened during the morning.

== In art ==
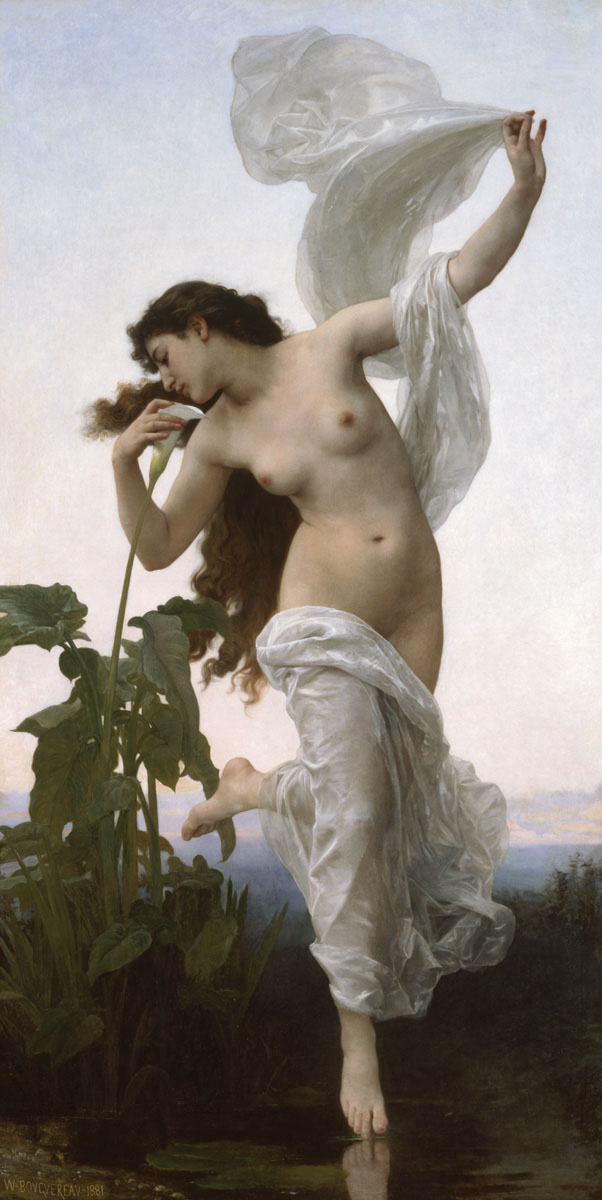
L'Aurore by William-Adolphe Bouguereau, 1881

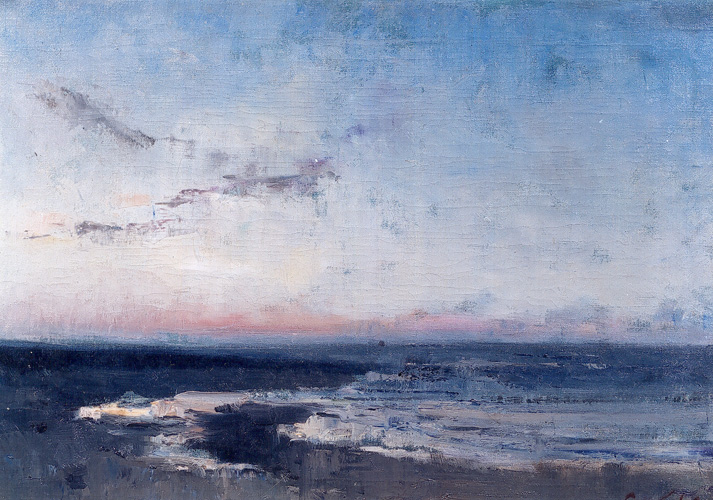
L'aurore, Mer du Nord by Guillaume Vogels, c. 1877

== In literature ==
- Homer uses the stock epithet "rosy-fingered Dawn" frequently in The Iliad and The Odyssey
- An aubade (Occitan Alba, German Tagelied) is a song about lovers having to separate at daybreak
- Aurora Musis amica (Dawn is a friend to the Muse), in Epigrammata Disticha Poetarum Latinorum, Veterum et Recentum, Nobiliora (1642) by Barthold Nihus
- The Dawn, volume 1 on Jean-Christophe written by Romain Rolland
- Dawn, a novel written by Henry Rider Haggard, published in 1884
- "Dawn", a poem written by Rupert Brooke published in The Collected Poems of Rupert Brooke
- "Dawn", a poem written by Richard Aldington
- "Dawn", a poem written by Emily Dickinson
- "Dawn", a poem written by Francis Ledwidge
- "Dawn", a poem written by John Masefield
- "Dawn", a poem written by William Carlos Williams
- I Greet the Dawn: Poems, a book of poetry written by Paul Laurence Dunbar, published January 1, 1978, by Atheneum Books
- "Dawn", a four-line poem from Lyrics of Lowly Life, a book of poetry written by Paul Laurence Dunbar, originally published in 1896. This poem was published again in The Complete Poems of Paul Laurence Dunbar, the 1913 collection of his work--

An angel, robed in spotless white,

Bent down and kissed the sleeping Night.

Night woke to blush; the sprite was gone.

Men saw the blush and called it Dawn.

-Dawn by Paul Laurence Dunbar

== See also ==
- Dawn chorus (electromagnetic)
- Dawn phenomenon
- Dusk
- Sky
- Sunrise
- Sunset
- Twilight
