= Hans Potthof =

Swiss canoeist

Hans Potthof (January 24, 1911 – March 29, 2003) was a Swiss painter as well as a sprint canoeist who competed in the late 1930s.

Potthof completed in the K-1 1000 m event at the 1936 Summer Olympics, but was eliminated in the heats.

He later was a painter and graphic artist; he painted landscapes and figures, and created drawings, lithographs, murals, mosaics and stained glass. His mural on the Katastrophenbucht, created in the 1970s, was remarkable: the painting existed until 1998.
