= Dusk (Bouguereau) =

1882 painting by William-Adolphe Bouguereau

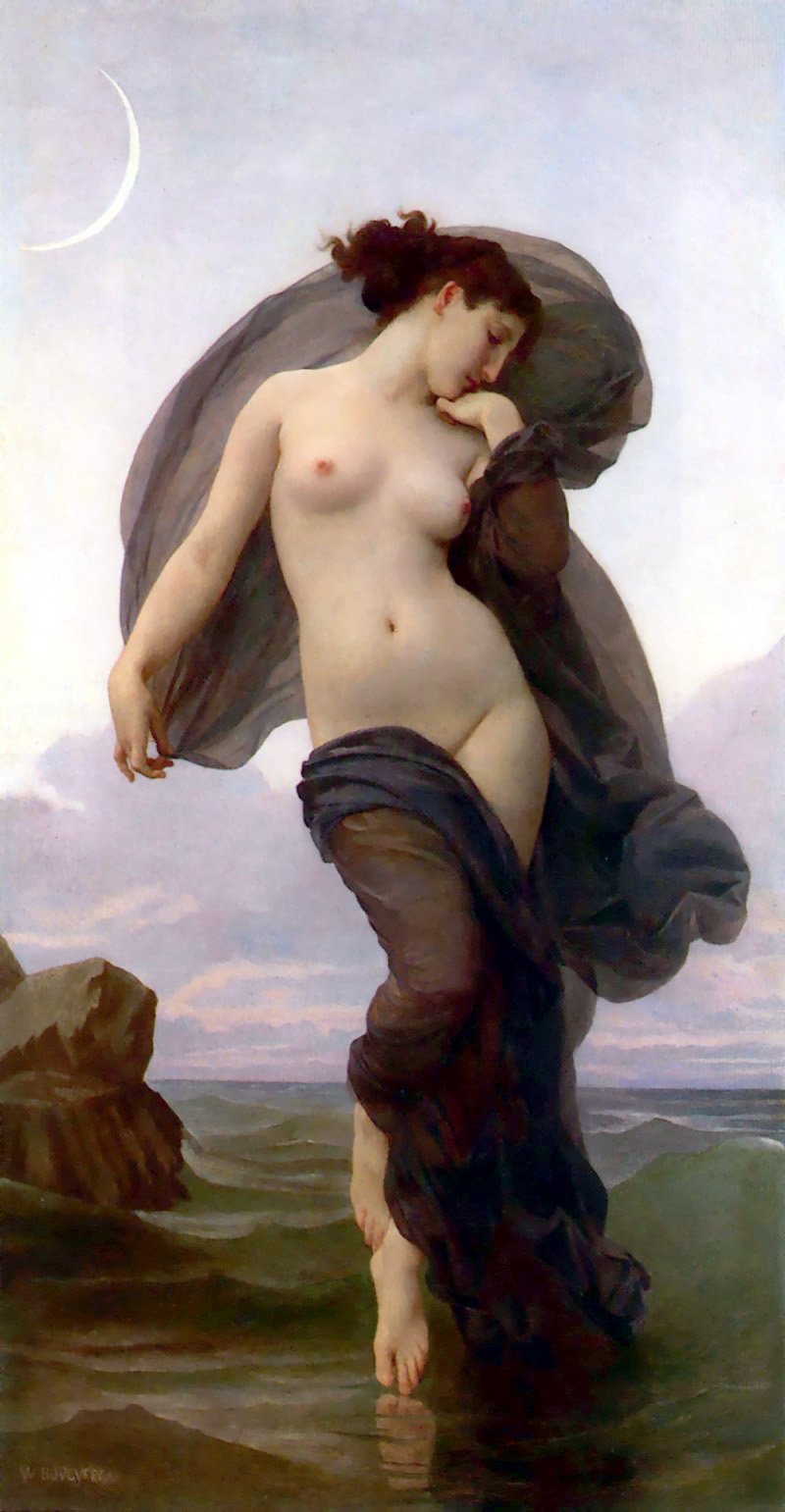
- Artist: William-Adolphe Bouguereau
- Year: 1882
- Medium: Oil on canvas
- Dimensions: 207.5 cm × 108 cm (81.7 in × 43 in)
- Location: Museo Nacional de Bellas Artes de La Habana, La Habana, Cuba

Dusk (Le Crépuscule) is an 1882 painting by William-Adolphe Bouguereau, now in the collection of the Havana's Museum of Fine Arts, in Cuba.

This is one of the series of canvases representing the four Times of Day: the others were Dawn in 1882; Night in 1883; and Day in 1884.

== See also ==
- William-Adolphe Bouguereau gallery
