= Aurora and Cephalus (Boucher) =

1733 painting by François Boucher

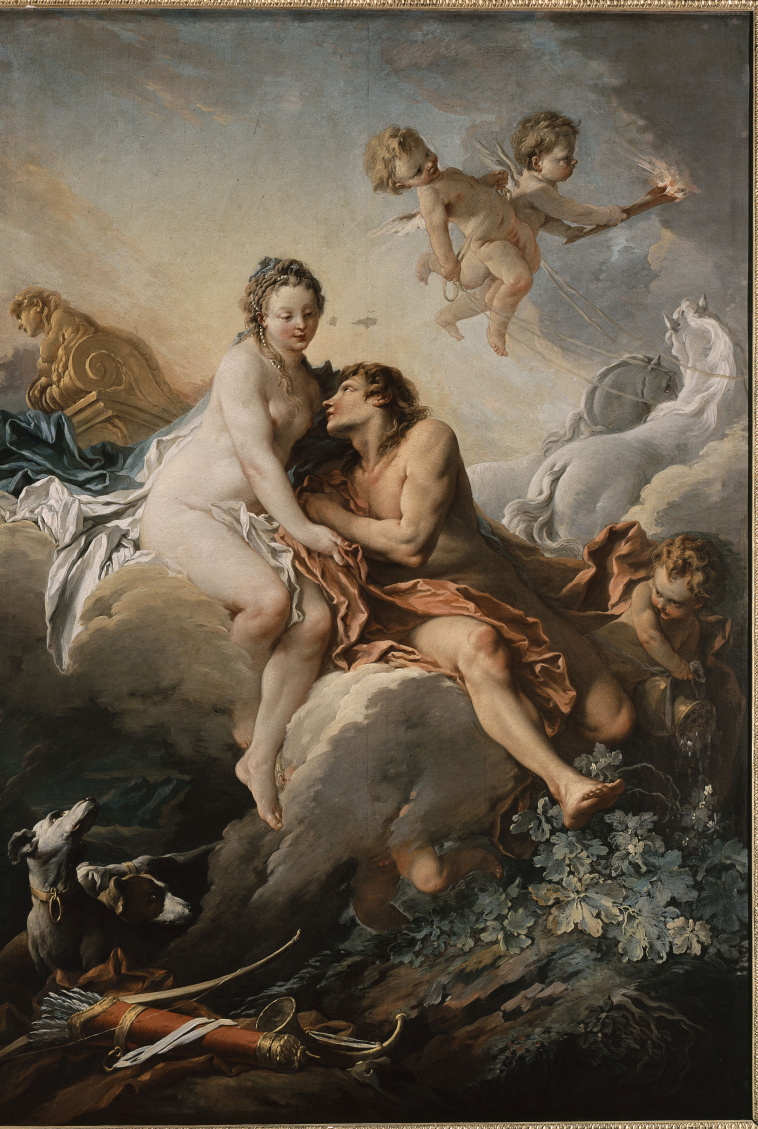
Aurora and Cephalus (1733) by François Boucher

Aurora and Cephalus is a 1733 oil-on-canvas painting by François Boucher, signed by the artist and now in the Musée des Beaux-Arts de Nancy. It shows Cephalus and Aurora (the Roman form of Eos) from Book VII of Ovid's Metamorphoses.

== History ==
Boucher produced it after his return from Italy and it was commissioned by François Derbais, advocate to the Parlement of Paris, for his hôtel particulier on rue de la Poissonnière in Paris, as a pendant to Venus Asking Vulcan for Weapons for Aeneas (1732, Louvre). Derbais' descendants sold both works, which came back on the market together in the posthumous sale of Watelet's collection on 12 June 1786. They were bought by Paillet for the French royal collection in the Louvre for 3121 livres.

In 1801, while the Louvre was known as the Central Museum of Arts, Aurora and Cephalus was one of thirty works it selected to decorate the Château de Lunéville for the signing of the Treaty of Lunéville between France and Austria. At the request of the Meurthe département the Boucher and twelve other paintings were permanently placed in the museum at Nancy even before the passing of the décret Chaptal on 1 September 1801, seen as the foundation date for France's regional museums.

== Display history ==
=== Nancy ===
- Art français au temps de Stanislas, June–September 1955
- De l'an II au sacre de Napoléon. Le premier musée de Nancy, 23 November 2001 – 4 March 2002

=== Elsewhere ===
- Trois siècles de peinture française. XVIe – XVIIIe. Geneva, Musée Rath, 1 July – 16 October 1949
- La femme dans l'art français. Bruxelles, Palais des Beaux-Arts, March–May 1953
- Masterpieces of french painting through five centuries (1400–1900). New Orleans, Isaac Delgado Museum of Art, 17 October 1953 – 10 January 1954
- European masters of the eighteenth century. London, Royal Academy of Arts, winter exhibition 1954–55
- Chefs-d’œuvre du Musée de Nancy. Liège, Musée des Beaux-Arts, 24 December 1964 – 24 January 1965
- De Watteau à David. Peintures et dessins des musées de province français. Bruxelles, Palais des Beaux-Arts, 27 September – 30 November 1975
- François Boucher. 1703 – 1770. New York, The Metropolitan Museum of Art, 17 February – 4 May 1986
- De Tintoret à Manet. Chefs d’œuvre du Musée des Beaux-Arts de Nancy. Japan, 1994
- De Barocci a Modigliani. Le collezioni del Musée des Beaux-Arts di Nancy. Parma, Palazzo Ducale di Colorno, 1 March – 1 June 1997

== See also ==
- Eos, a 1895 painting by Evelyn De Morgan which depicts the Greek equivalent of Aurora, Eos
