= Columbia Museum of Art =

Museum in South Carolina, United States

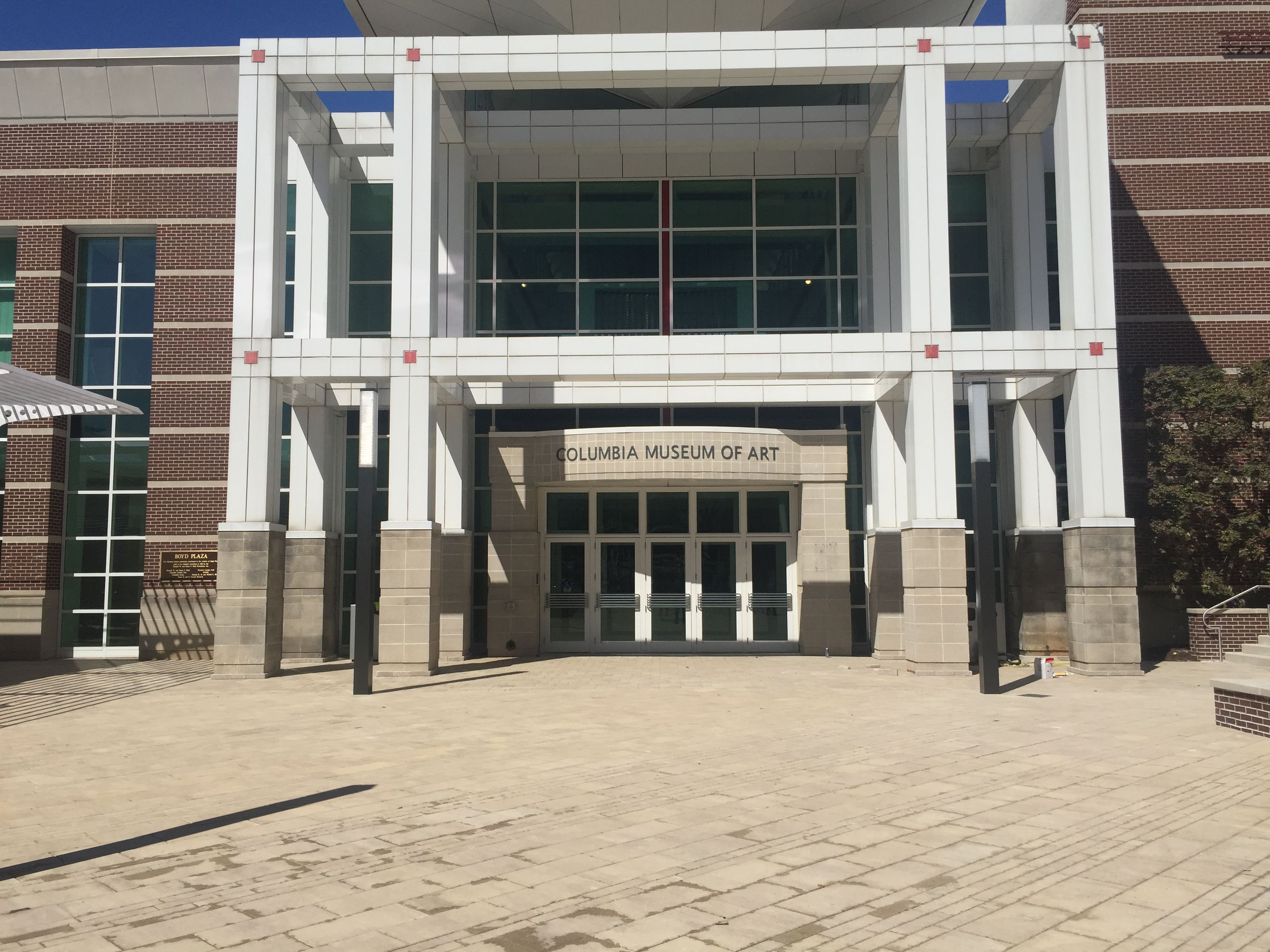
- Entrance pictured in 2019
- Location: Columbia, South Carolina; United States
- Coordinates: 34°0′21″N 81°2′10″W
- Type: Art museum
- Director: Della Watkins
- Website: columbiamuseum.org

The Columbia Museum of Art is an art museum in the American city of Columbia, South Carolina.

== History ==
The Columbia Museum of Art was originally in the 1908 private residence of the city's Taylor family. Located on Senate Street in Columbia, adjacent to the campus of the University of South Carolina and three blocks from the South Carolina State House, the Taylor House, through the addition of gallery wings and a round planetarium, became the home of the Columbia Museum of Art for almost 50 years. Subsequently, the Taylor House was added to the National Register of Historic Places in 1982.

When the museum was founded in 1950, the first-exhibited art collection consisted of the gifts and bequests of local collectors and ten Old Master paintings, several by Joshua Reynolds, Scipione Pulzone, Juan de Pareja, and Artus Wolffort.

The circumstances appreciably changed in 1954, when the museum was included among the 95 institutions nationwide selected to receive donations of Renaissance and Baroque art from the Samuel H. Kress Foundation. Designated as a regional center by the Kress Foundation, the Columbia Museum of Art and Science received, over the next 20 years, 78 examples of fine and decorative art from the Renaissance and Baroque periods.

== 1998 building and collections ==
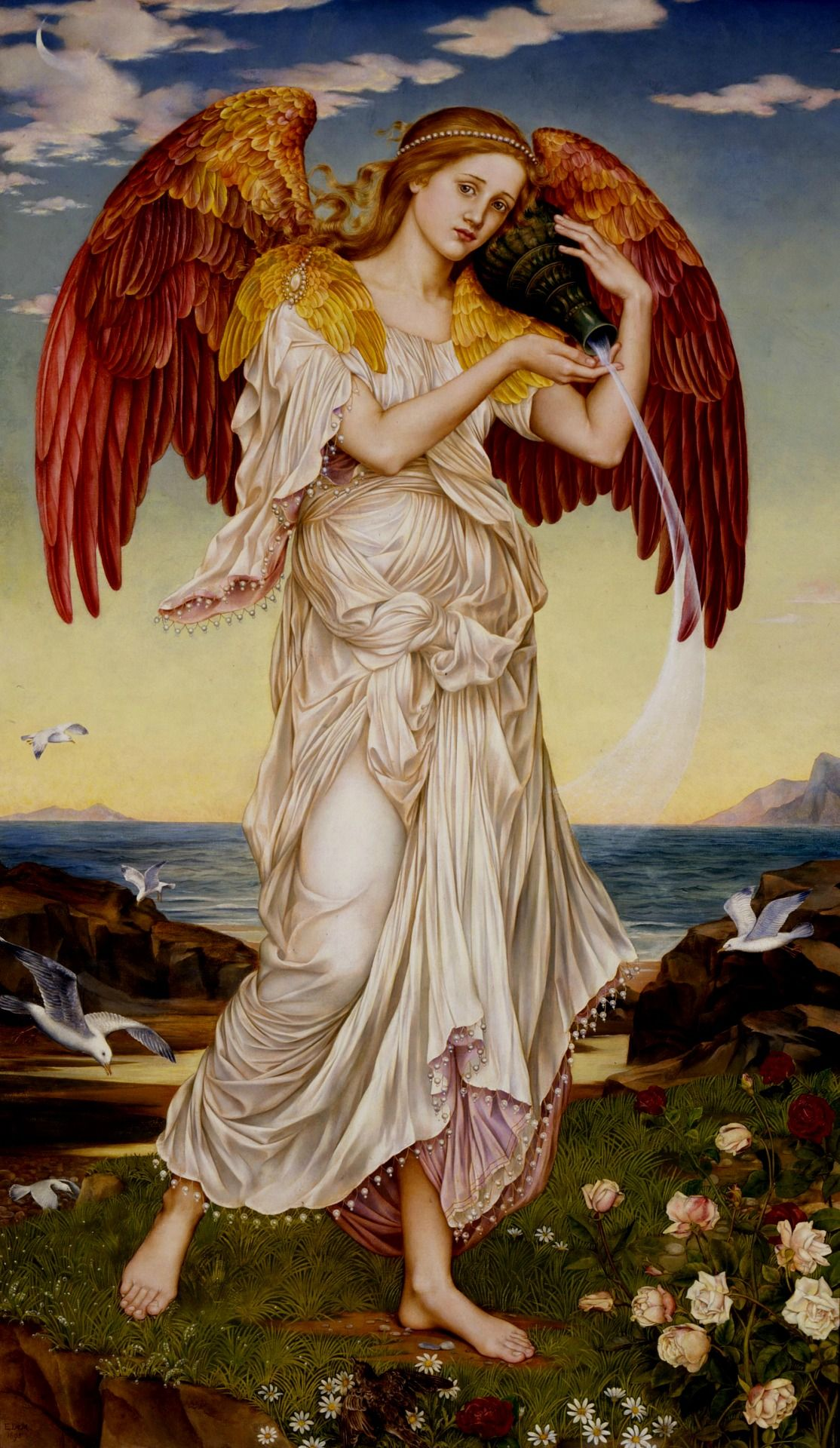
Eos, by Evelyn De Morgan, 1895

Following the opening of the South Carolina State Museum in 1988, the Columbia Museum of Art and Science eliminated its science component to focus its interests and resources on the role of an art museum. Despite the additional gallery space made available by the removal of the science displays and the planetarium, by the 1990s the museum had outgrown the Taylor House complex and the 7,000 sq. ft. (650m^{2}) exhibition space there.

The site eventually chosen for a new museum building was at the intersection of Main and Hampton Streets. This location was occupied by two adjacent department stores (Belk and Macy's) that then stood deserted. The Belk building was partially demolished to allow for the creation of a public space and sculpture garden, called Boyd Plaza, in front of the new museum. (The rear portion of the Belk building became the framework on which the TD Bank building was built). The 2017 plaza renovation was a gift to the city from the Darnall W. and Susan F. Boyd Foundation Inc. The structural skeleton of the other department-store building, Macy's, provided the steel framework around which the new building was constructed. Designed by architects Bobby Lyles and Ashby Gressette of the Columbia-based firm of Stevens & Wilkinson, the new museum opened to the public in 1998 with 22,000 sq. ft. (2,055m^{2}) of gallery space and 30,000 sq. ft. (2,787m^{2}) for future utilization.

The exterior of the new museum building, although postmodern in style and mirroring the former Macy's facade, preserves its earlier appearance through the use of brick veneer and the entrance portico of the institution's Taylor House past. The brick-paved Boyd Plaza includes the sculptures Upright Motive No. 8 (c. 1955-1956) by Henry Moore, Apollo Cascade (2007) by Robert Carroll, and Jali XXXVII (2013) by Steven Naifeh.

The glass entry doors of the museum open into the Robinson Jr. atrium and Dubose-Preston Reception Hall, which extends to the full two-story height of the building. The inverted-truss roof design allows natural light. Since 2010, the atrium has included a 14-ft. (4.27m) chandelier composed of bundled strands of red, orange, and gold glass by Dale Chihuly, commissioned by The Contemporaries, the museum's young professional group. Adjacent to the atrium is a 164-seat auditorium; the first-floor galleries are on the far side. Four of these galleries accommodate changing exhibitions and two more display selections of modern and contemporary art from the permanent collection.

Twenty galleries on the second floor contain a timeline of the history of European and American art from antiquity to the modern era. A small but significant collection of art and artifacts from the ancient Mediterranean world is presented in the first gallery. Included in antiquities are examples of early Greek ceramics from the R.V.D. Magoffin Collection, a large black-figured Greek lekythos acquired in 1973, the Robert L. Hanlin Collection of 4th-century BCE Greek vases from Southern Italy, Roman glass from the George C. Brauer Collection, and a collection of 12 Greco-Roman marble sculptures donated by Dr. Robert Y. Turner in 2002. The Turner marbles include a headless standing statue of Hygeia and 11 Roman portrait heads.

Old Master European paintings and sculpture from the Renaissance and Baroque periods, including art from Kress collection, are also presented. At the former Taylor House, the Kress collection was separated from the rest of the museum's collection; in the new building, the Kress works are integrated into the whole, aiming for chronological continuity and a smoother progression through the history of Western art. Artists represented include:

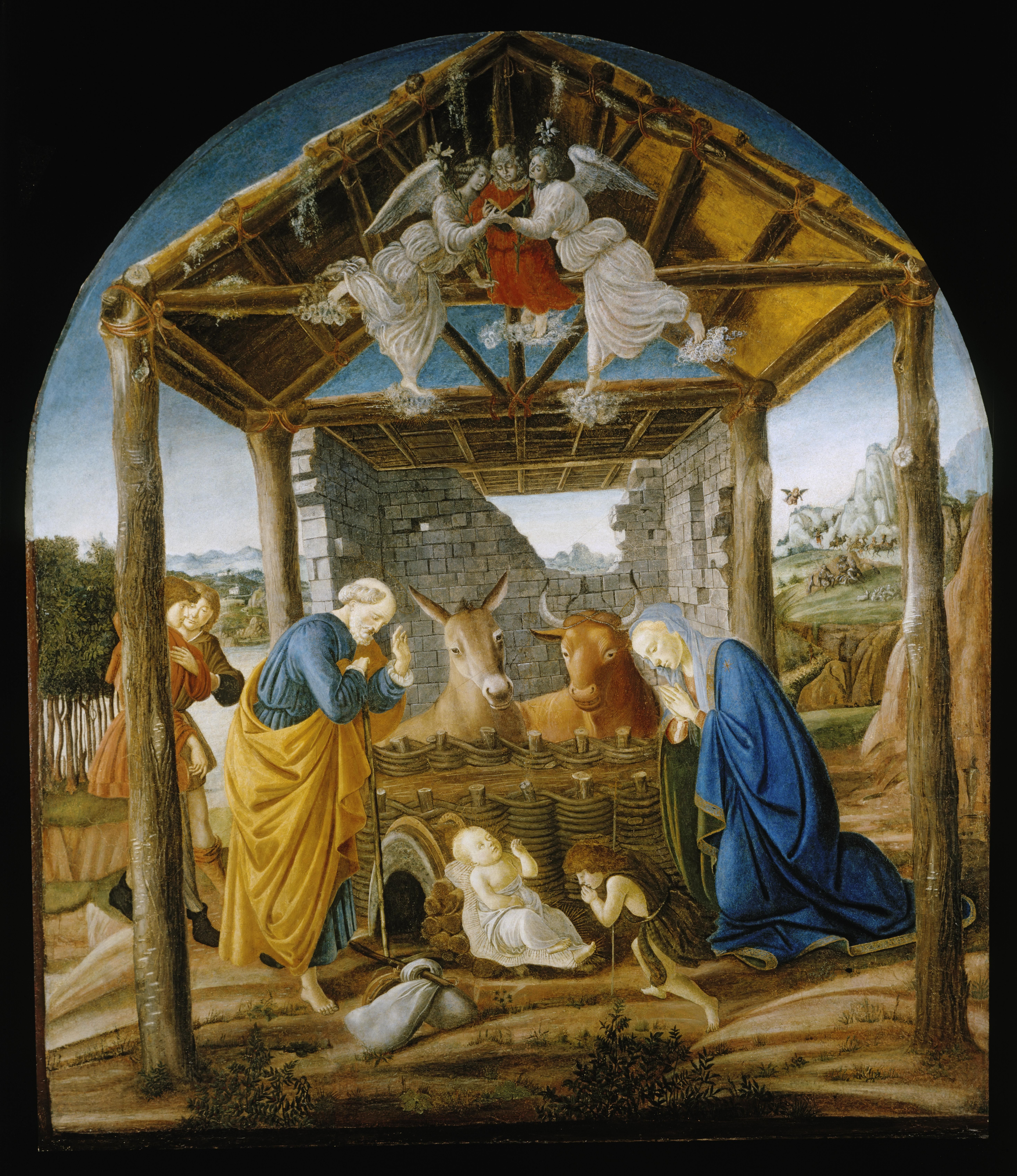
Botticelli's Nativity (1475)

- Bernardo Daddi
- Sandro Botticelli (with his only fresco in an American collection)
- Ambrosius Benson
- Andrea Solario
- Francesco Parmigianino
- Jacopo Tintoretto
- Bernardo Strozzi
- Salvatore Rosa
- Guido Cagnacci
- Jacob van Ruisdael
- Alessandro Magnasco
- Jusepe de Ribera
- François Boucher
- Joshua Reynolds
- George Romney
- Benjamin Wilson
- Giovanni Canaletto
- Francesco Guardi

The sequence of the European tradition was interrupted in 2009 by the introduction of gallery space for displaying Chinese works of art donated in 2003 and 2007 by Dr. Robert Y. Turner>ref?. It surveys Chinese art from ca. 2000 BCE to 1400 CE (Xiajiadian culture to Yuan dynasty) as tomb sculptures from the Tang dynasty. European and American paintings, sculpture, furniture, and decorative arts from the 18th to the 20th centuries occupy the remaining galleries on this level. This portion of the museum's collection includes paintings by:

- Gilbert Stuart
- Thomas Sully
- William Scarborough
- Albert Fitch Bellows
- Washington Allston
- William Merritt Chase
- Claude Monet

Furniture includes pieces by Duncan Phyfe, Gustav Stickley, and Louis Majorelle; silver by the Hayden brothers of Charleston; stained glass by Daniel Cottier and the Tiffany Studios; and ceramics from Newcomb College. Special collections housed at the museum include drawings in the Dorothy and Herbert Vogel Collection and Bunzlauer pottery from Eastern Germany.

In 2019, the museum exhibited work by Jasper Johns and his collection of paintings by modern artists such as Andy Warhol and Roy Lichtenstein. (He attended USC from 1947 to 1948 and grew up in South Carolina. Johns spent several years living with his aunt Gladys on Lake Murray, which is why there's a children's program at the museum called Gladys' Gang.) The museum also had the exhibition "Charcoal drawings by Georgia O'Keeffe from 1915" in 2016; she taught at Columbia College in late 1915. It has also had exhibitions by Matisse, Dalí, and Norman Rockwell. Others have included "Turner to Cézanne (with Van Gogh)" in 2009, "Monet to Matisse" in 2013, and a 20-ft. (610 cm) Jackson Pollock mural in 2019. There was the photography exhibition "Who Shot Rock & Roll: A Photographic History, 1955 to the Present" in 2010.

== Other institutions ==
- List of art museums
- List of museums in South Carolina

== Bibliography ==
- Charles R. Mack, European Art in the Columbia Museum of Art. Volume I: The Thirteenth Through the Sixteenth Century, Columbia: University of South Carolina Press, 2009, pp. 12–14
- Robert Ochs, The Columbia Art Association, 1915–1975. The Columbia Museum of Art, 1950–1975: A History, Columbia: Columbia Museums of Art and Science, 1975, pp. 5–35,
- Columbia Museum of Art Visitors Guide, published July 12, 1998, as a supplement to The State newspaper.
