= Aurora (mythology) =

Goddess of dawn in Roman mythology

- Personification of dawn
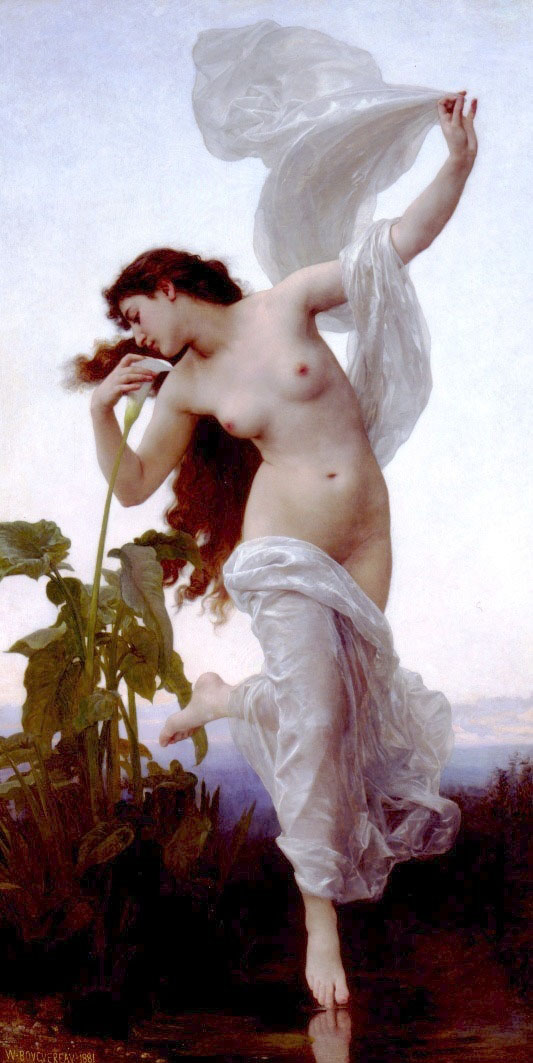
- L'Aurore by William-Adolphe Bouguereau (1881)
- Abode: Sky
- Symbol: Chariot, saffron, cicada

Genealogy
- Siblings: Sol and Luna
- Consort: Astraeus, Tithonus
- Children: Anemoi

Equivalents
- Greek: Eos

In Roman mythology, Aurora (/ɔːˈrɔːrə/ or /əˈrɔːrə/; Latin: Aurōra, Latin pronunciation: [au̯ˈroːra]) is the goddess and personification of the dawn. Aurora is the Latin word for dawn, and she appeared frequently in Latin literature.

Like the Greek Eos and Rigvedic Ushas, Aurora continues the name of an earlier Indo-European dawn goddess, Hausos.

== Name ==
Aurora stems from Proto-Italic *ausōs, and ultimately from Proto-Indo-European *h_{a}éusōs, the "dawn" conceived as divine entity. It has cognates in the goddesses Ēṓs, Uṣas, Aušrinė, Auseklis and Ēastre.

== Roman mythology ==
In Roman mythology, Aurora renews herself every morning and flies across the sky, announcing the arrival of the Sun. Her parentage was flexible. The poet Ovid named her as the daughter of the Titan Hyperion, but also referred to her as Pallantis, signifying she was the daughter of Pallas. She has two siblings, a brother— Sol, the Sun— and a sister— Luna, the Moon. Roman writers rarely imitated Hesiod and later Greek poets by naming Aurora as the mother of the Anemoi (the Winds), who were the offspring of Astraeus, the father of the stars.

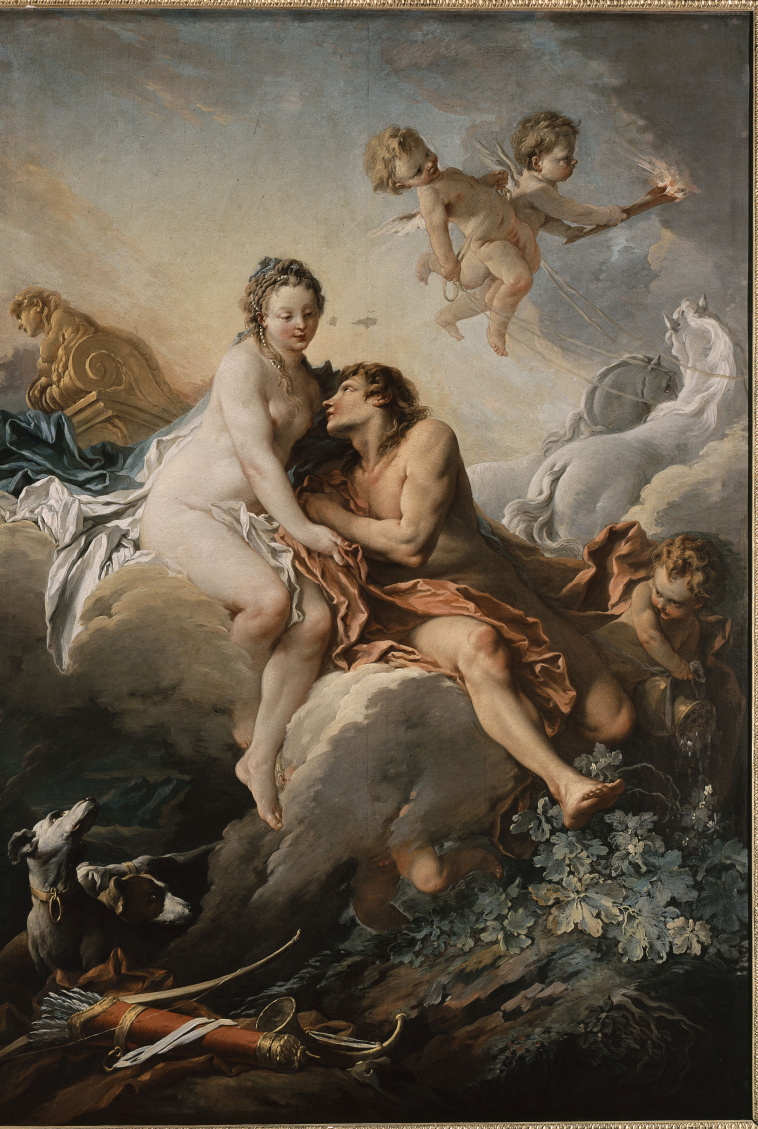
Aurora and Cephalus, 1733, by François Boucher

Most commonly, Aurora appears in erotic poetry with one of her mortal lovers. A myth taken from the Greek by Roman poets tells that one of her lovers was the prince of Troy, Tithonus. Tithonus was a mortal, and would therefore age and die. Wanting to be with her lover for all eternity, Aurora asked Jupiter to grant immortality to Tithonus. Jupiter granted her wish, but she failed to ask for eternal youth to accompany his immortality, and he continued to age, eventually becoming forever old. Aurora turned him into a cicada.

== In Roman literature ==
Ovid's Heroides (16.201-202), Paris names his well-known family members, among which Aurora's lover as follows:

A Phrygian was the husband of Aurora, yet she, the goddess who appoints the last road of night, carried him away

Virgil mentions in the fourth book of his Aeneid:

Aurora now had left her saffron bed, And beams of early light the heav'ns o'erspread

Rutilius Claudius Namatianus mentions in his 5th century poem De reditu suo:

Saffron Aurora had brought forward her fair-weather team: the breeze offshore tells us to haul the sail-yards up.

== In popular culture ==
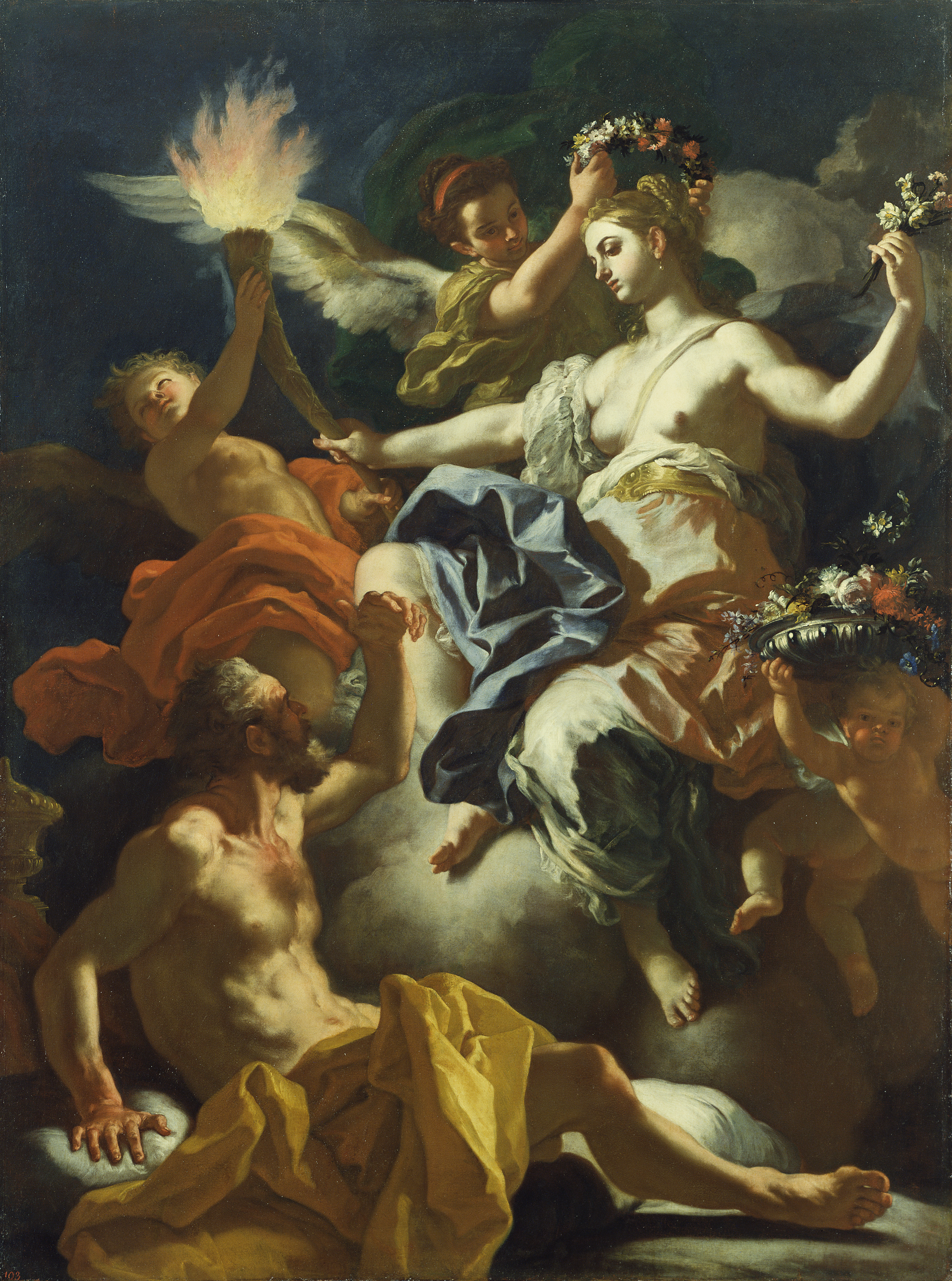
Aurora Taking Leave of Tithonus 1704, by Francesco Solimena

Aurora has been referenced and depicted frequently in literature, poetry, theater, and music.

- In Shakespeare's Romeo and Juliet, Lord Montague describes the Sun drawing the curtains of night away from Aurora's bed.
- Aurora and Flora, the goddess of spring, are depicted interacting with Neptune in the traditional Irish folk song "Lord Courtown."
- The 18th century African-American poet Phillis Wheatley referenced the relationship between Aurora and Tithonus in "On Imagination."
- In Chapter 8 of Charlotte Brontë's Villette, when Madame Beck fires her old Governess first thing in the morning, Lucy Snowe compares her to Aurora.
- Alfred, Lord Tennyson described Aurora as glimmering, with sweet, bright eyes and red cheeks in his poem "Tithonus."
- The 20th-century Polish poet Zbigniew Herbert wrote about Aurora's grandchildren in "Kwestia Smaku." In the poem they are ugly, but will eventually grow to be beautiful.
- The first and strongest of the 50 Spacer worlds in The Caves of Steel and subsequent novels by Isaac Asimov is named after the goddess Aurora. Its capital city is Eos.
- Icelandic singer-songwriter Björk describes the goddess in the song "Aurora" on her Vespertine album.

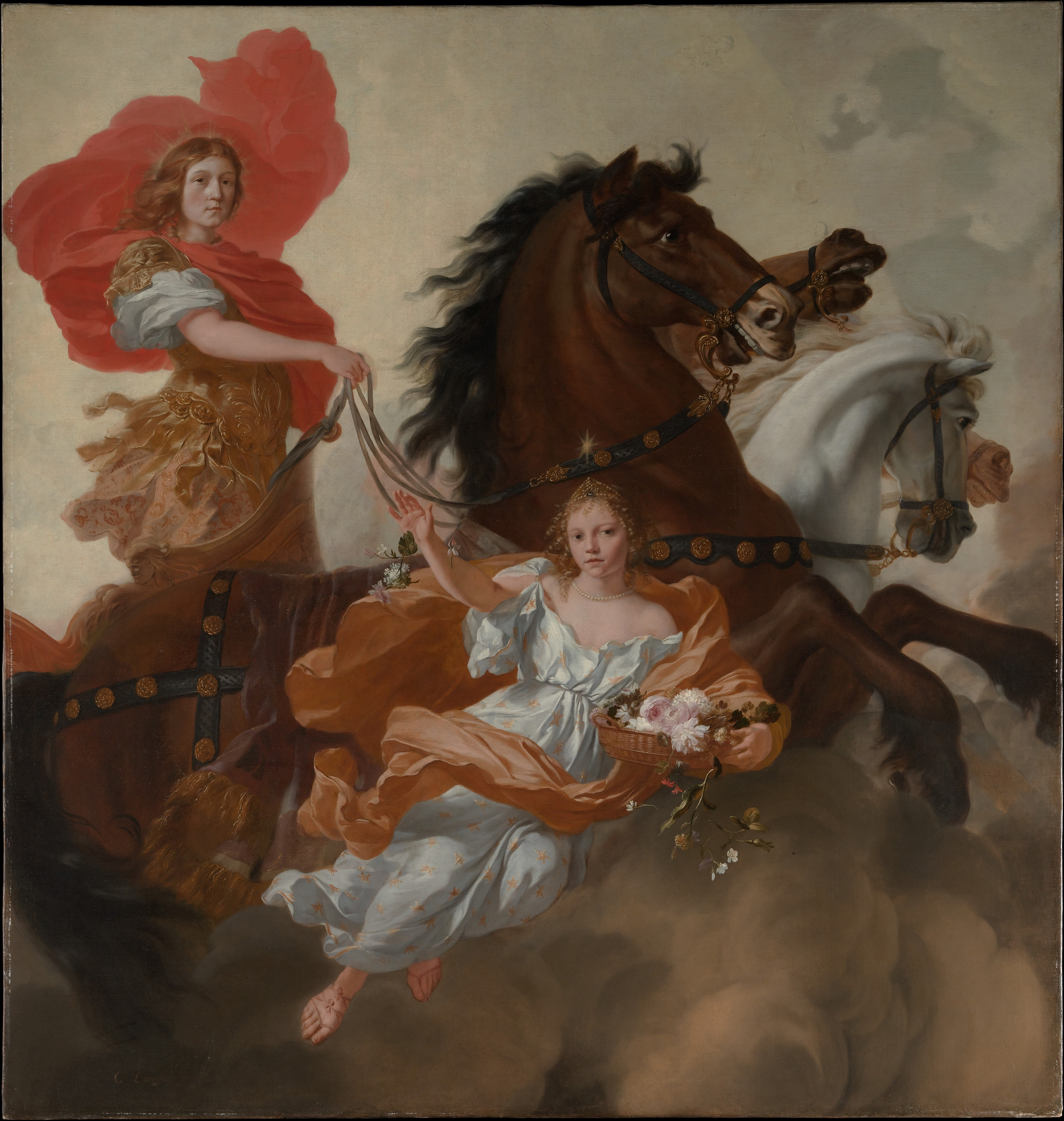
Apollo and Aurora, 1671 by Gerard de Lairesse

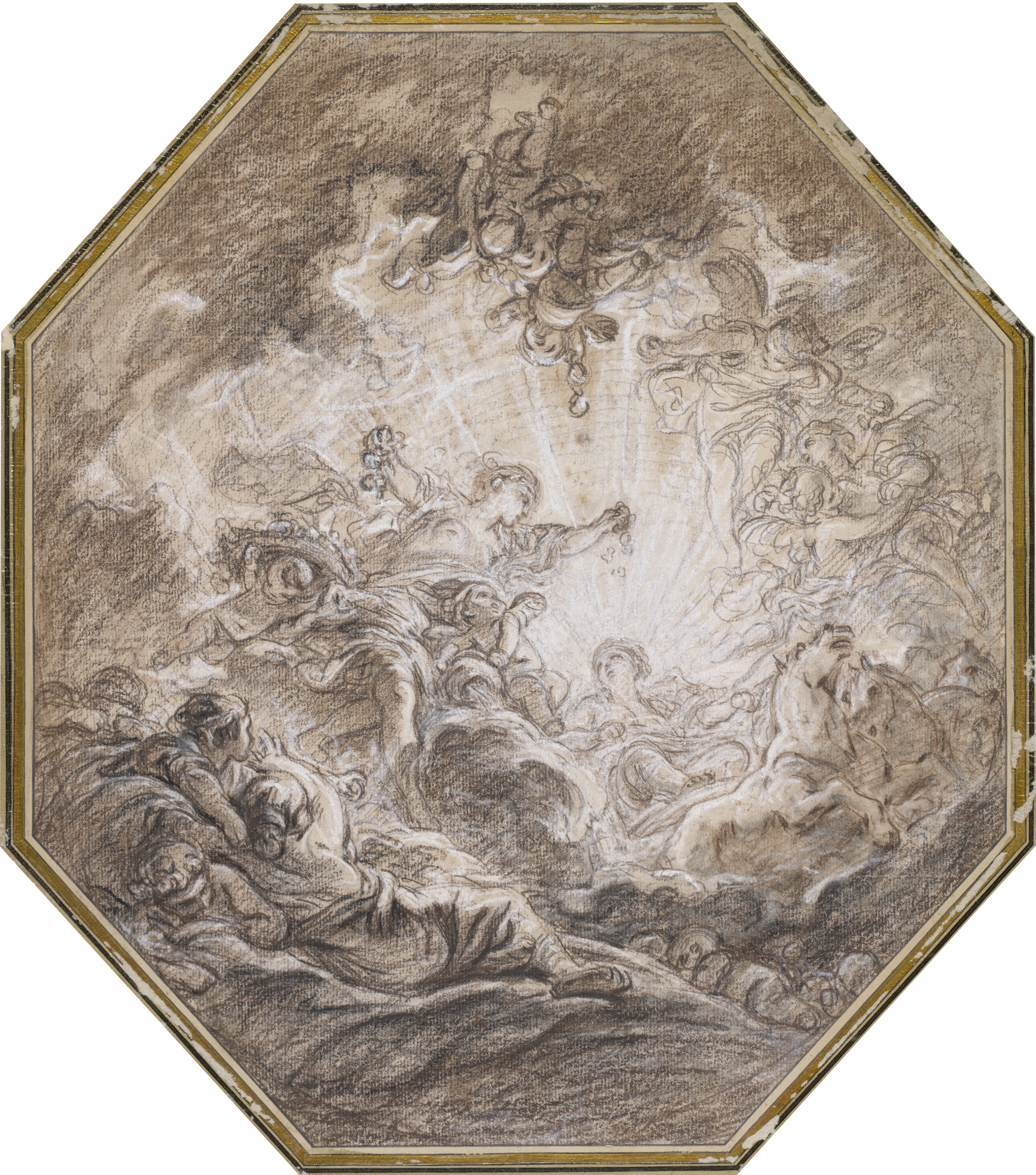
Aurora Heralding the Arrival of the Morning Sun, c. 1765, by François Boucher

== Depiction in art ==
- Aurora, fresco by Guido Reni (1614) in Palazzo Pallavicini-Rospigliosi, Rome
- Aurora (Artemisia Gentileschi) (c.1625-1627)
- Aurora by Guercino (1591–1666)
- The Countess de Brac as Aurōra by Jean-Marc Nattier (1685–1766)
- Aurora e Titone by Francesco de Mura (1696–1782)
- Aurra and Cephalus, by Anne-Louis Girodet de Roussy-Trioson (1767–1824)
- The Gates of Dawn by Herbert James Draper (1863–1920)
- Aurōora and Cephalus by Pierre-Narcisse Guérin (1774–1833)
- Aurora by Odilon Redon (1840–1916).
- Aurore by Denys Puech (1854–1942).

== See also ==
- Dawn goddess
- Eos
- List of solar deities
- Mater Matuta
- Memnon (mythology)
- Zorya
