= William Harrison Scarborough =

American painter

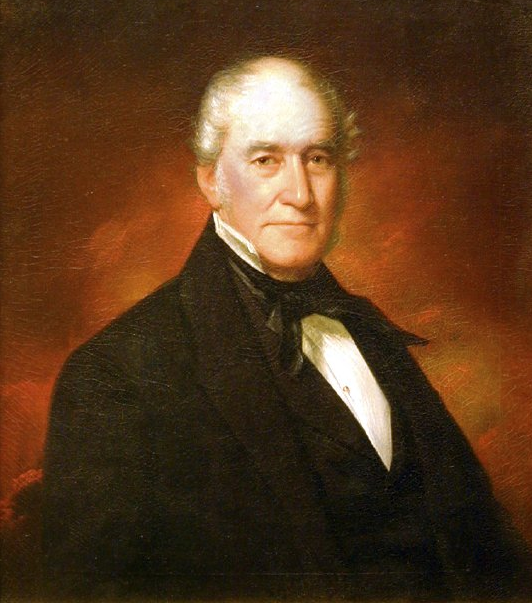
Portrait of Thomas Bennett, Jr., by William Harrison Scarborough

William Harrison Scarborough (November 7, 1812 – August 16, 1871) was an American painter, active mainly as a portraitist. A native of Tennessee, he spent much of his career in South Carolina.

Scarborough was born in Dover, Tennessee to John and Sally Bosworth Scarborough, whose family origins were in Scarborough, Yorkshire. He often employed a family coat of arms dating back to the Wars of the Roses; one art historian noted that he "sealed his letters with a white rose as a memento of the sympathies of his family in days gone by." His father allowed him to travel on an educational trip when he was 16; the only paintings he had seen up until that point were those in the local tavern. Around 1828, he began the study of medicine in Cincinnati, but soon decided to become an artist instead, and he is known to have worked with Horace Harding and Henry Inman in that city. He may also have come to know Dr. Daniel Drake at the same time. He underwent more thorough training in Nashville under the tutelage of John C. Grimes in 1830. He is also known to have studied and worked in Florence, Tuscumbia, Cortland, and Athens, Alabama; Kingston, Rogersville, and Knoxville, Tennessee; and Georgia. In 1838, he is recorded as working in Lynchburg, Virginia.

Scarborough married Sarah Ann Gaines in Dover on October 8, 1833. She died in childbirth on March 29, 1835, and he and his infant son John left Tennessee for Alabama before settling in Charleston, South Carolina in 1836. It was in Charleston that he was provided with his first commissions when planter and lawyer John Miller asked him to paint some of his seven daughters; the artist married one of the seven, Miranda Eliza, on November 28, 1838, and the couple lived with her parents for a time before moving. Scarborough had opened a studio in Cheraw, South Carolina in 1836, and his father-in-law's connections soon ensured a steady stream of patronage there from families such as the DuBoses, Murrells, Furmans, and Lides. This dried up by 1843, and the artist and his wife relocated to Columbia, where he would remain for the rest of his life.

Scarborough soon became the preeminent portrait painter in Columbia. Barely a year after he arrived in the city, he received his most important commission to date when he was requested by the Committee of the Clariosophic Society of South Carolina College to paint John C. Calhoun; so successful was the portrait that it was requisitioned by Calhoun's son Andrew, and the Society was forced to commission another for its quarters. Other sitters included James Chesnut and Wade Hampton. He continued traveling, visiting Charleston and Nashville on business and touring Europe, stopping in London, Paris, and Rome, in 1857. He is known to have produced portrait miniatures during his career as well, although few are extant; a pair are currently in the collection of the Metropolitan Museum of Art. He also kept meticulous account books, listing his sitters and the proceeds he received from his work. Prices for his paintings could reach upwards of $100. He is said to have worked rapidly, alternating between portraits during the day and often finishing two in a week; he seldom signed his pictures.

Scarborough continued painting to the end of his life; at his death, he had completed over 230 portraits and left an estate valued at $20,000, a substantial sum for the period. He was initially interred in the churchyard of Trinity Episcopal Cathedral but was removed some years later when his wife went to live with a daughter in Ridge Spring. She had him reinterred in the Ridge Spring Cemetery, intending to be buried by his side after her death; ironically, she died on a visit to her son in Morrilton, Arkansas, and was buried there instead.

Portraits by Scarborough today are found in the collections of the Metropolitan Museum of Art, the Morris Museum of Art, the Gibbes Museum of Art, the Columbia Museum of Art, and the University of South Carolina, among other institutions. Wofford College owns a pen-and-ink drawing of Benjamin Wofford, the school's founder. A self-portrait is held by the Florence Museum in Florence, South Carolina. The Columbia Museum of Art also holds a landscape painting by the artist, depicting the falls of the Reedy River in Greenville, South Carolina and dating to a sojourn in that town in 1840; a handful of other landscapes and still-life paintings have been identified, but the vast majority of his output is in the field of portraiture.
