= Katastrophenbucht =

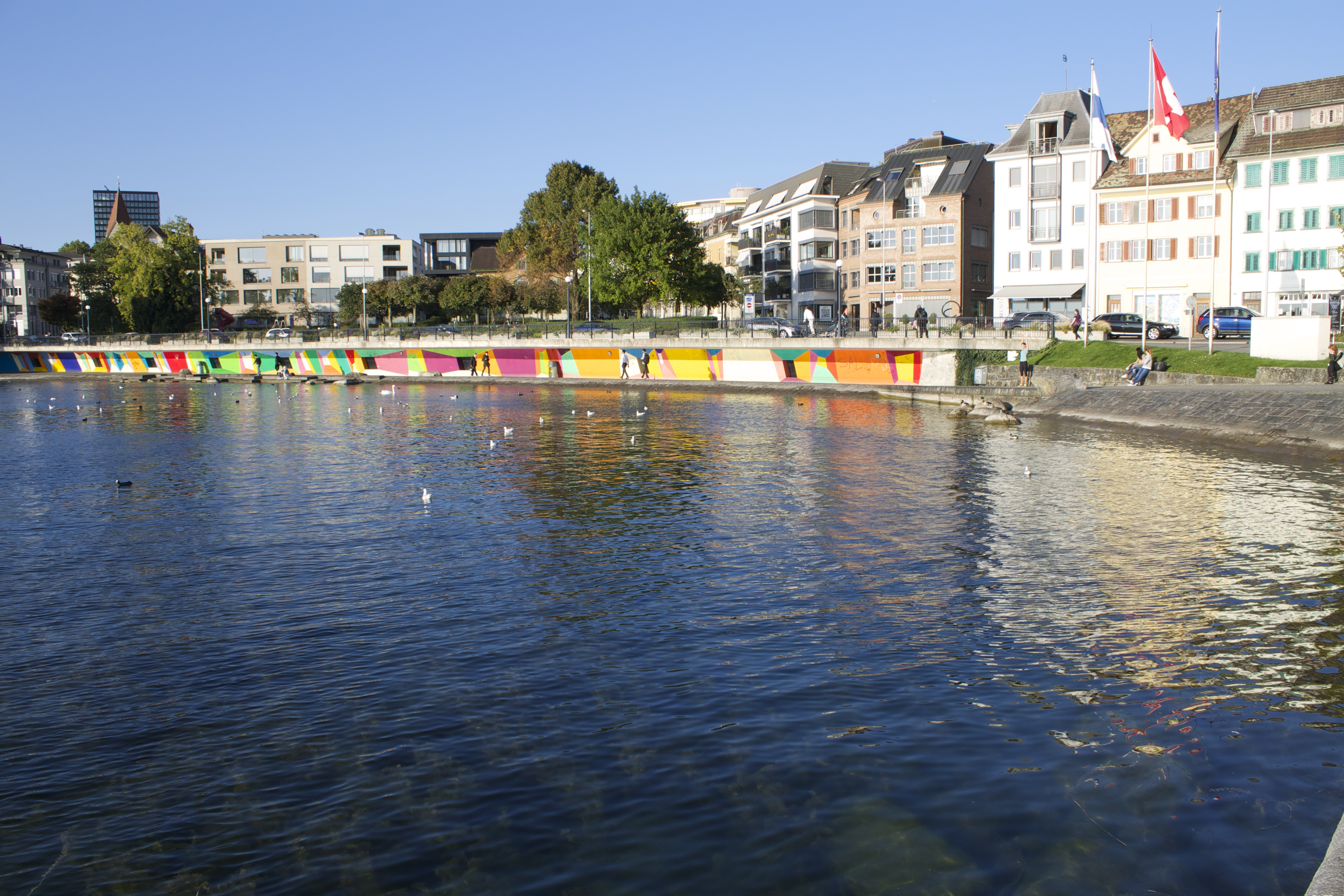
- The Katastrophenbucht from Rigiecke

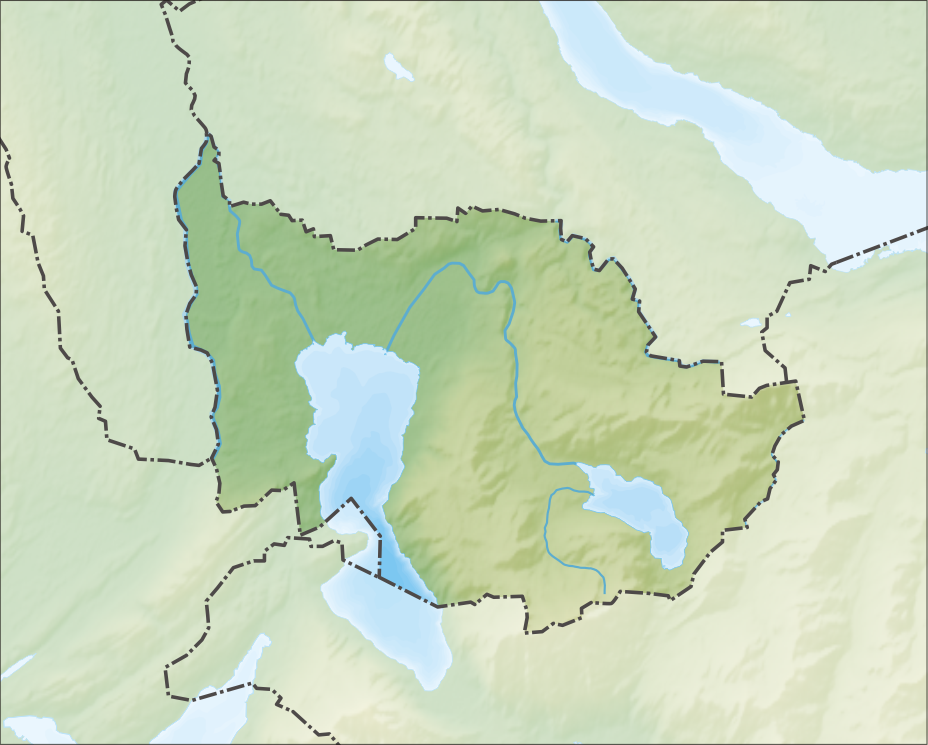
- Location of the Katastrophenbucht Katastrophenbucht (Switzerland) Katastrophenbucht (Italy) Katastrophenbucht (Alps)
- Interactive map of Katastrophenbucht
- Location: Zug, Switzerland
- Coordinates: 47°10.2′N 8°30.8′E
- Type: Bay
- Etymology: Katastrophe meaning "disaster", referring to a ground seepage killing 11 persons in 1887
- Part of: Lake Zug
- Max. length: max. 150 m (0.093 mi)
- Max. width: max. 70 m (0.043 mi)
- Surface area: 0.01 km^{2} (0.0039 sq mi)
- Shore length^{1}: 0.29 km (0.18 mi)
- Settlements: Zug
- ^{1} Shore length is not a well-defined measure.

The Katastrophenbucht (″disaster bay″) is a bay on Lake Zug in the city of Zug. Its name derives from a catastrophe in a shore part called Vorstadt, in which the lake shore broke on 5 July 1887 and flooded residential buildings.

== Description ==
The Katastrophenbucht is about 150 meters long and extends about 70 meters into the shore. It covers the area of the bridge Vorstadtbrücke, which is flanked to the west of the landing stage Zug Bahnhofsteg of the Zugersee Schifffahrt, and to the east of the Rigiecke. It is part of the boulevard Vorstadt.

In 1998, Maria Bettina Cogliatti designed the 112-meter-long bay front with Trompe-l'œil, a color field painting: three warm and two cold color fields (or vice versa) face each other. Twenty-one hues have been contrasted in such a way that the colors of warm yellow-orange on the side of the Vorstadtquai, into violet, green and red, and finally the direction of the Alpenquai run into a cool blue. Cogliatti arranged the colored surfaces together to create illusionist interruptions, niches and windows in the wall, creating an imaginary living and living space, a ″colorful city″.

Behind the bay is the Rigiplatz, whose artistic conception by Anton Egloff (1995) is also reminiscent of the 1887 catastrophe.

== History ==
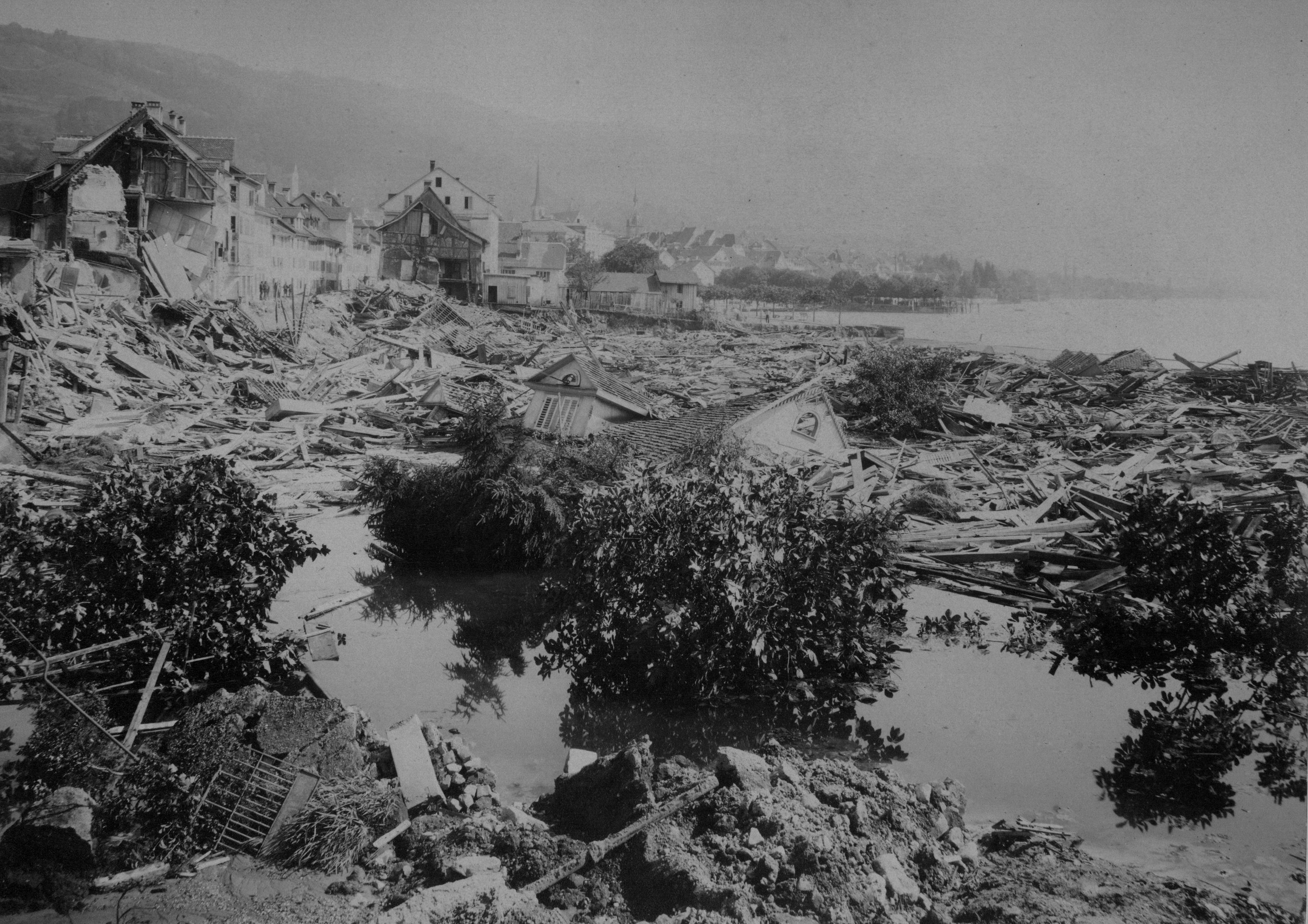
The 1887 disaster: roofs of sunken houses

The Vorstadt (an ancient suburb of Zug) was built on geotechnically unstable sea chalk. The East-West Railway Company wanted to realize a quaiproject there from the 1860s. The project contract went to the engineer Franz Karl Stadlin, Karl Pestalozzi prepared a first report for this project, and the construction projects of the Quaianlage were politically discussed for decades. In the 1880s, the works began. Cracks on the shore prompted the city council to instruct the engineers Albert Heim and Robert Moser with a technical analysis, which was completed in July 1884; their report strongly criticized the project. Because of the influence of the municipal minister of construction Clemens Henggeler, the critical report of Heim and Moser were hardly discussed in the city council, and the work was continued.

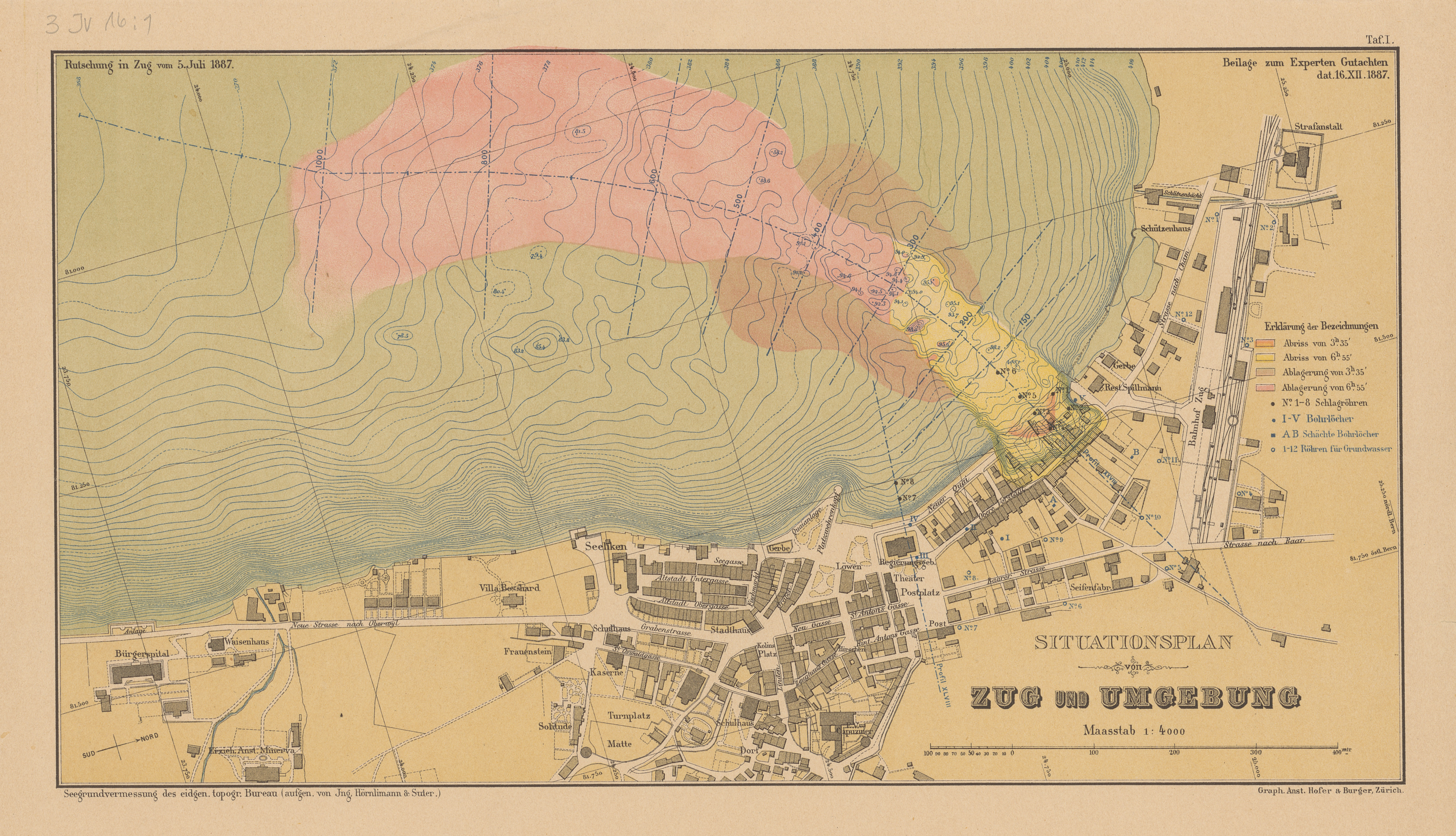
Map of the Katastrophenbucht after the 1887 disaster

On the day of the catastrophe, 5 July 1887, the subsoil lost its strength at the site of the Quai. In the afternoon, several buildings collapsed on the shore, several people died. A second flooding followed in the evening: Shortly before seven o'clock the walls of the suburb of Zug Vorstadt faltered, the inhabitants fled in panic as the houses collapsed and sank in the lake. In total, eleven people died, about 650 people were homeless, and 35 buildings were destroyed. A bay about 150 meters long opened up, which reached about 70 meters into the land. In the bay roofs of sunken houses looked out, household goods, beams and furniture swam in the lake. The breakthrough caused a huge wave, which washed a steamship ashore.

After a few days, disaster tourism began; onlookers, who came from far away, were driven on ships to the demolition zone for 40 Centimes.

In the northern area of the disaster zone, a memorial stone with a poem by Isabelle Kaiser remembers since 1887 to the disaster. Following the disaster, the Rigiplatz was realized by Robert Moser in 1891. In addition, the surrounding houses were demolished at the "Neue Quai" and created the Rössliwiese for security reasons.

In the Cantonal Archives of the Canton of Zug there are numerous documents on the Katastrophenbucht.
