= Dawn (Bouguereau) =

1881 painting by William-Adolphe Bouguereau

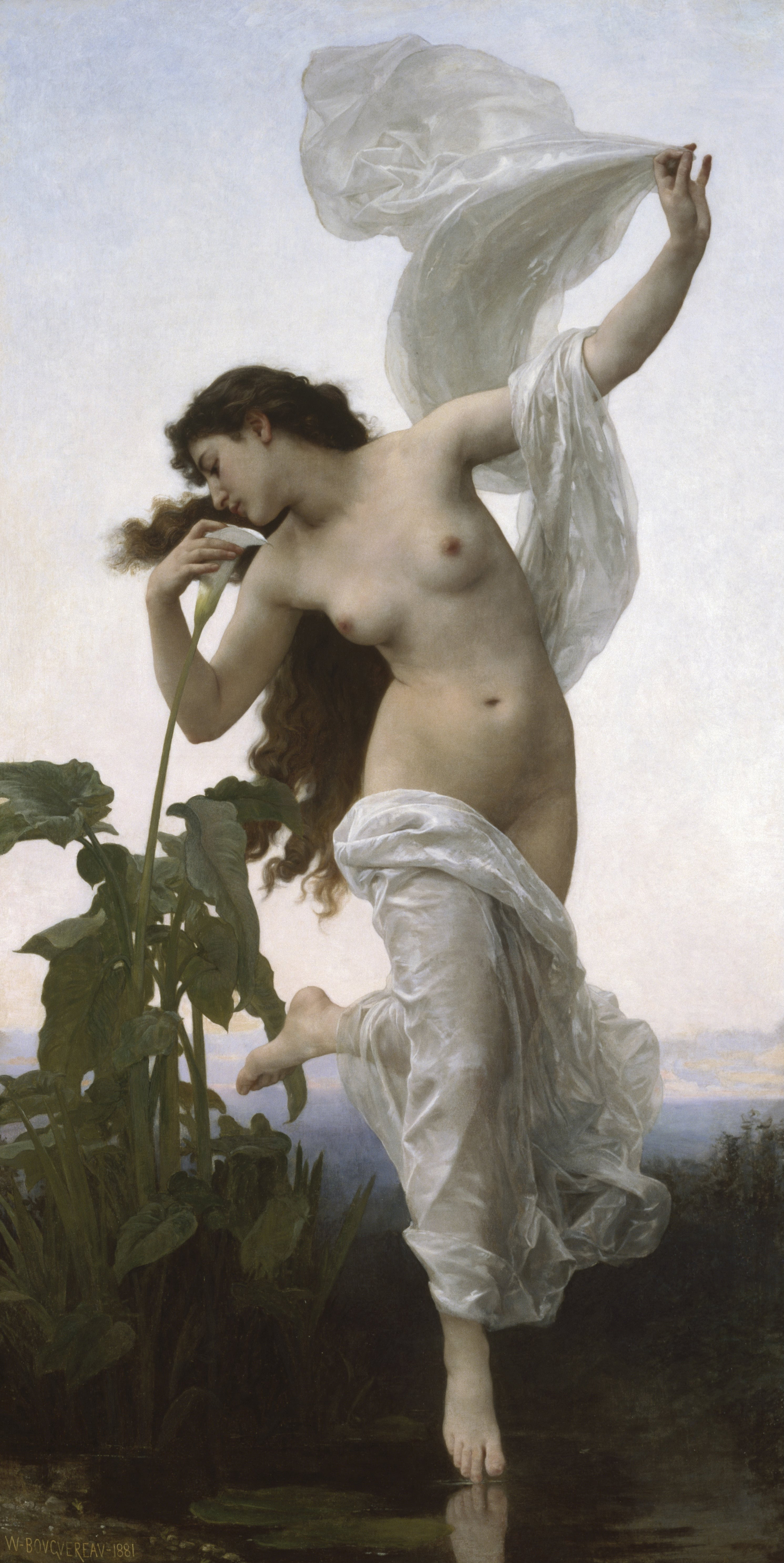
- Artist: William-Adolphe Bouguereau
- Year: 1881
- Medium: Oil on canvas
- Dimensions: 214.9 cm × 107 cm (84.6 in × 42 in)
- Location: Birmingham Museum of Art; Birmingham, Alabama

Dawn (French: L'Aurore), also known as the Girl with a Lily, is an oil-on-canvas painting created in 1881 by the French artist William-Adolphe Bouguereau. It was one of his most notable works. Its dimensions are 214.9 × 107 cm. This is the first in a series of canvases representing the four Times of Day: the others were Dusk in 1882; Night in 1883; and Day in 1884.

It is now in the Birmingham Museum of Art.
