= Etruscan sea-faring =

The Etruscans engaged in trade and conflict with the rest of the ancient Mediterranean on land and on the water. Though the physical evidence of their water crafts is sparse and the written evidence is non-existent, there is still evidence of their sea-faring through artistic depictions and Etruscan trade goods found in places only viable by water. Pieces like the Aristonothos Krater, the Tomb of the Boat, and smaller bits of graffiti on pottery support evidence also found in shipwrecks about trade and other daily Etruscan maritime life.

== Depictions of boats in Etruscan art ==
There is a lack of written documentation of Etruscan maritime vessels, so most of the finer details come from depictions on pottery, depictions on tomb walls, and small models found in tombs.

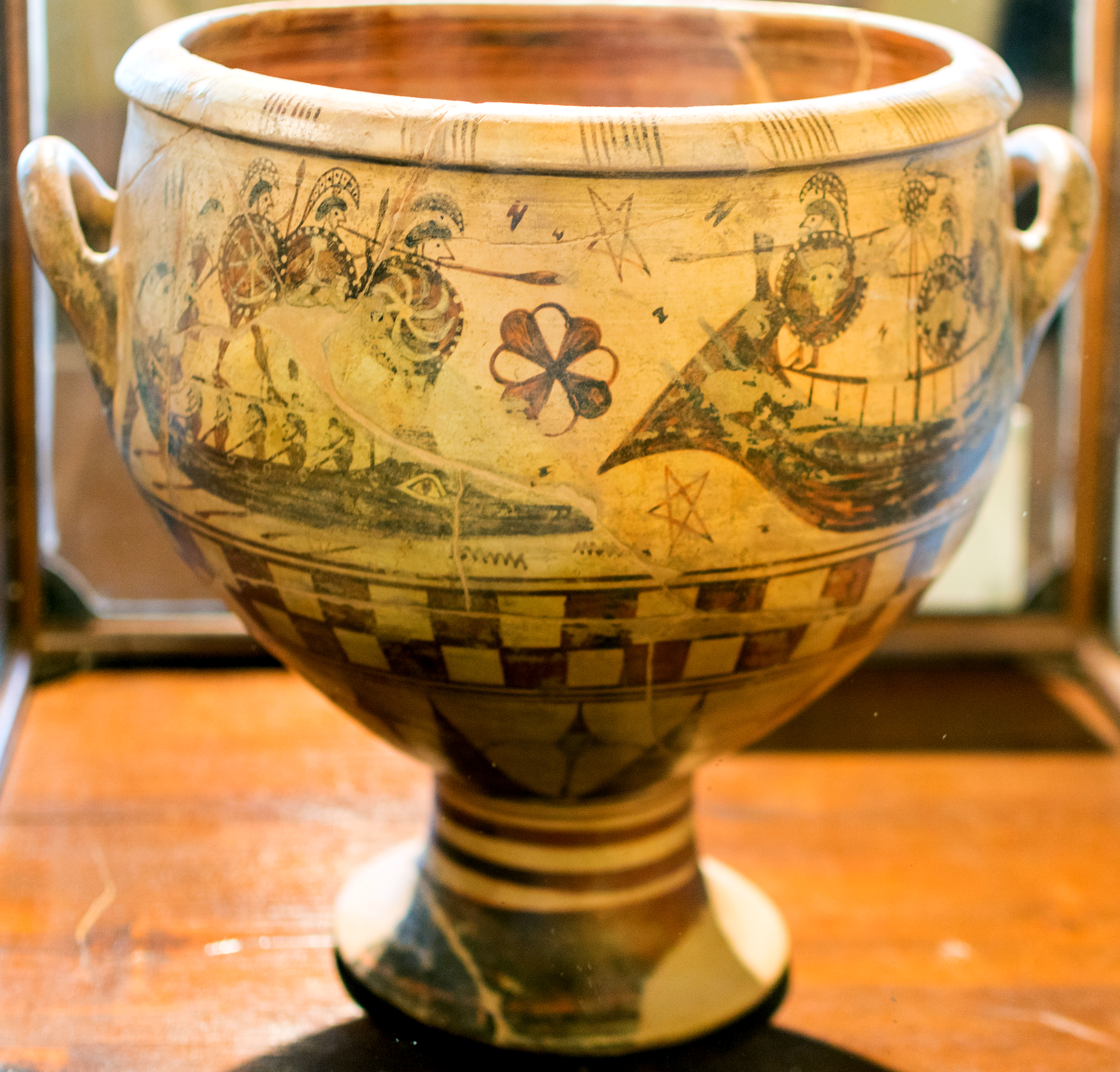
Aristonothos Krater, on the side which depicts a battle at sea

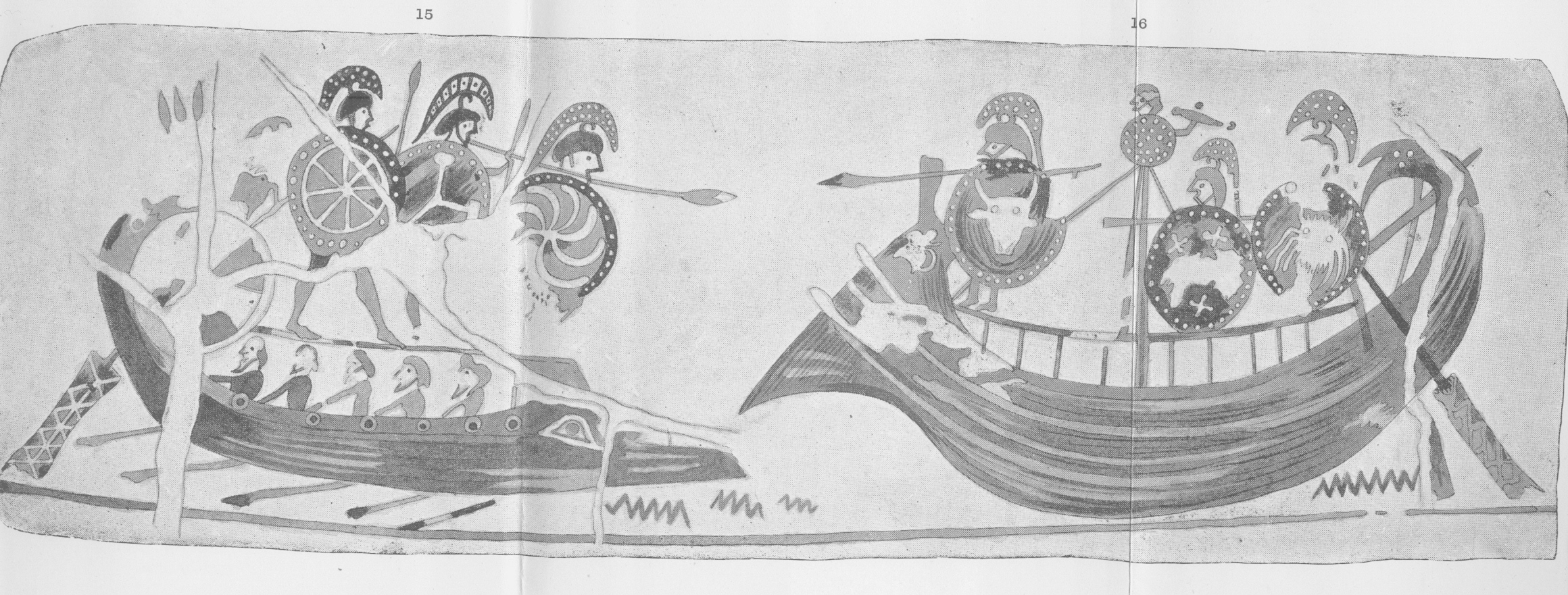
Aristonothos Krater image, laid flat

=== The Aristonothos Krater ===
The Aristonothos (Aristomphos) Krater is a krater found in a necropolis in Caere, dated to the mid 7th century BCE. It depicts on one side, the Greek myth of Odysseus and the Cyclops, and on the other, a battle between a Greek warship and another vessel. The Greek ship, depicted on the left, has a high curving stern and a detailed eye painted onto the bow. The other ship is of unknown origin but is hypothesized to be an Etruscan trading vessel. It has a mast but no sail, a deck with wooden supports, and three warriors standing, ready for battle.

Based on the color and type of clay of which the krater is made, it seems to have been manufactured in Caere where it was eventually found. The style of the krater differs from mid-7th century mainland Greece of that time, but somewhat resembles the pottery of Argos at that time. Argos was not known for being colonizers or bringing their goods elsewhere, however it is generally agreed that Argive potters probably did move around and eventually settled in the south of Italy. The shape and style of the krater reflect a mixture of Greek and western influences, and most scholars agree that it was made by a Greek potter living in Caere.

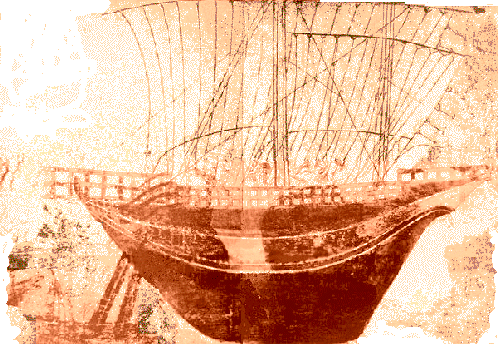
Ship on the wall of the Tomb of the Ship

=== Tomba della Nave ===
The Tomba della Nave (Tomb of the Boat) is a tomb in the Monterozzi necropolis in Tarquinia which, on the left wall, depicts a large Etruscan merchant sailing vessel. A smaller single-masted vessel accompanies the large two-masted vessel, and both are surrounded by smaller boats. This is the only depiction of a merchant ship and a port seen in the Tarquinian necropoleis.

The large ship has a round hull and rigging similar to a depiction of a Greek merchant vessel seen on an Attic cup from the late 6th century BCE. The tomb itself is dated to the beginning of the 5th century BCE.

=== Hydria of the Micali painter ===
Currently sitting in the British museum, the Hydria of the Micali painter, dated to the end of the 6th century BCE, depicts an Etruscan naval battle. The ship itself has many similarities to Greek ships at the time, with the keel extending into a boar's head at the bow, right above which is painted an eye.

=== Other depictions ===
The Tragliatella Oinochoe is an oinochoe found in a necropolis in Tragliatella, east of Caere. It depicts on it what appears to be a family and other figures as well as an Etruscan boat, pictured vertically. The meaning of the images on the oinochoe are debated to be either reflexive of Etruscan family beliefs or depictions from Greek mythology.

There are miniature clay models of 9th-8th century BCE Etruscan boats found in tombs in Caere and Tarquinia. The oldest models are of smaller, probably monoxylon craft, and the newer models are more complex, with multiple deck levels, masts, and ornamentation. Some of these models have, at one or both extremities of the craft, modeled heads of ducks. Some of these models have holes in them resembling oar ports. Some have a base that extends beyond the craft, likely portraying the keel and its cutwater.

== Appearance and function ==
A few recognizable shipwrecks have been found, and their contents and construction have provided information about how they were made and used, both supporting artistic depictions and including more intricate details.

=== Shipwrecks ===
The La Love shipwreck found off the coast of Cap d'Antibes provides a fair picture of what goods Etruscan cargo ships would be carrying into other regions of the Mediterranean. Presumably hailing from the mainland, around Caere, it held more than 180 amphorae, stored in staggered rows, around eighty other ceramic and bucchero pieces, and three stone anchor stocks. This was a mid-sized ship, at around fifteen meters long. The Grand Ribaud F shipwreck, found off of the Giens peninsula, was a similar type of ship, but it held an estimated 1,000 amphorae along with some bronze basins and discs and some other Etrsucan ceramic pieces from Caere. This was a fairly large ship, at or more than 25 meters long, capable of carrying up to 40 tons. This type of ship was typical in that it carried a single type of product from its origin to another region to be traded.

Other ships carried multiple types of products. Surviving examples of these include the Giglio, which was on the larger side of these types of ships, and the Bon Porté 1, which were both named for the islands off of which they were each discovered. The Giglio carried amphorae, Greek and Etruscan ceramics, copper, iron, and lead ingots, and a bronze Corinthian helmet. By its size and build, it seems likely that the Giglio engaged in cross-Mediterranean trade charters. The Bon Porté 1 was a smaller ship, around 10 meters in length, and was more likely to charter coastal trade routes. It carried amphorae of Etruscan and Massalian origin, and was found to be a Massalian ship engaging in local distribution trade. The two ships were identical in all but their size.

=== Ship construction ===
The Bon Porté 1 was a ship constructed entirely with stitching. The wooden frame was first set out and held in place by tree nails, then layers of waterproof fabric were laid down over it and stitched to the frame. The holes were then covered up with pegs and the interior was painted with a wax and pitch mixture to ensure complete water resistance and protect the stitching. The Jules Verne 9 was identical to the Bon Porté 1, but was employed for other local work, including coral fishing. Both were constructed in a Massalian shipyard using techniques commonly found in Greek shipyards all over the Mediterranean. A majority of ship building techniques in the Mediterranean were not limited to one region, and the origins of most shipwrecks are somewhat debated.

Later ships, including the Jules Verne 7, employed more mortise and tenon joints, leaving the sewn parts to extremities of the hull.

One of the earliest examples of a depiction of an Etruscan boat was on a vase from Veii, from the beginning of the 7th century BCE. It has curling motifs on the bow and on the top of the mast, and has an upward curve on the stern. It shows a mixed propulsion system, with the oars out and the sail furled. There are lines indicating rigging made up of more than one type of fitting, including stays, shrouds, and braces. It has two quarter rudders on the stern and a point coming from the bow, interpreted to be a ram.

Rams were not uncommon in the Mediterranean, and there have been detachable bronze rams found in the area. The stempost of a ship would have a convex area where a ram could be attached and fastened. On a funerary urn from Volterra, there is a depiction of a three-pronged ram on the stern of a ship. That type of ram was also seen on other pieces of Etruscan pottery, and is also theorized to be mythological like the rest of the stories depicted on these pieces, but the frequency in which that motif comes up makes it likely rooted in some reality.

== Etruscan sea-farers ==
Etruscan ships were crewed by different groups of people for different reasons. The main use, and the one for which there is the most evidence, was trade. There was also an Etruscan naval presence and written accounts of naval battles between the Etruscans, with the help of their allies, and the other inhabitants of the Mediterranean. Etruscan pirates are a controversial topic among scholars, who use the evidence supporting the idea that they existed and the contesting evidence used to argue that they didn't, or at the very least, didn't exist in the capacity about which they were written.

=== Trade ===
At the beginning of the 6th century BCE, a new phase, later called the emporium phase began. Along with the new trade routes to Massalia and Gravisca, thanks to Phocaen merchants, came changes to organization of both trade routes and destinations. Before this shift, people of the higher classes would personally control the trade having to do with their land and goods. That role was then passed to professional navigators, usually of a lower class, who used this maritime trade responsibility as a means of social advancement. Since elites were no longer responsible for organizing trade routes, more cities established marked sections for trade filled with lower class workers and foreigners having come to sell their goods.

=== Military ===
Though mainly used for trade, there were also times when an Etruscan naval presence was necessary. Battles like the one near Alalia and the one near Cumae had the Etruscans fighting on the water. The Battle of Alalia, fought off the shore of Corsica over the city, Alalia, was fought between the Etruscans, with help from the Carthaginians, and the Greeks. The Greeks had already colonized Alalia, but when another wave of colonists, having just fought the Persians, came to the island trying to live there. When they were refused by the Greeks who already lived there, they set up in ships, attacking the Etruscan port cities of Pisa and Populonia. The Etruscans invoked a treaty made with the Carthaginians, and their navies combined to fight these ransacking Greek ships, ultimately losing.

=== Pirates ===
Along with military and other political conflicts, it is said that there were restrictions and stoppages to certain trade routes on account of piracy. This is a debated topic, possibly originating in the Homeric hymn to Dionysus which, from lines 6-12, reads

There soon approached a ship with sturdy benches—
Bad fortune brought Etruscan pirates near
Over the wine-dark sea, and when they saw him,
They nudged each other, rushed ashore, and caught him.
They threw him in their boat, gleefully thinking
He was the son of heaven-nurtured rulers
They set about to tie him with their hard ropes.

An Attic red-figure cup displays this scene, depicting what is inferred as a typical Greek pirate ship. However, the techniques seen in Etruscan ship building lean more towards defense, as is the case with merchant ships, than offense, as would be the case for pirates. Pirates, in order to have the capability of seeking out merchant ships and intercepting them, need to use ships faster than merchant ships, like warships.

It's also thought that the scene depicted on the Aristothonos Krater could be a depiction of an encounter between Etruscan pirates and a Greek warship. Additionally, there were big ports around the Mediterranean that handled a lot of marine traffic, specifically in Carthage, that could have been a kind of refuge for Etruscan and Greek pirates.
