= Tapsennia gens =

Ancient Roman family

The gens Tapsennia was an obscure plebeian family at ancient Rome. No members of this gens occur in history, but several are known from an inscription dating from the middle of the first century, under the early empire.

== Origin ==
The nomen Tapsenna is clearly of Etruscan derivation, as shown by the distinctly Etruscan termination -enna in its masculine form. The inscription mentioning several members of this family is from Teanum Sidicinum in northern Campania, a region that had been colonized by the Etruscans at a very early period, although it is not impossible that the Tapsennae settled there at a later time.

== Branches and cognomina ==
The only cognomen associated with the Tapsennae known from epigraphy is Proculus, originally a praenomen that had fallen out of use in Republican times, but was later revived as a surname. From its form, Proculus seems to be a diminutive of Procus, a very ancient word for a prince, or in later times, a suitor. although a popular explanation in later times was that the name was given to a child born while his father was abroad.

== Members ==
This list includes abbreviated praenomina. For an explanation of this practice, see filiation.

- Lucius Tapsenna, the father of Publius, and grandfather of Publius Tapsenna Proculus and Quintus Tapsenna.
- Publius Tapsenna L. f., the father of Publius Tapsenna Proculus and Quintus Tapsenna, was buried in a mid-first-century family sepulchre built at Teanum Sidicinum in Campania by his son, Publius.
- Publius Tapsenna P. f. L. n. Proculus, a veteran of the tenth cohort of the Praetorian Guard, died at the age of thirty-two. He built a family sepulchre at Teanum Sidicinum for himself, his wife, Pettia Urbana, his father, Publius, and brother, Quintus.
- Quintus Tapsenna P. f. L. n., the brother of Publius Tapsenna Proculus, in whose mid-first-century family sepulchre at Teanum Sidicinum he was buried.

== See also ==
- List of Roman gentes

== Bibliography ==
- Paulus Diaconus, Epitome de Sex. Pompeio Festo de Significatu Verborum (Epitome of Festus' De Significatu Verborum).
- Theodor Mommsen et alii, Corpus Inscriptionum Latinarum (The Body of Latin Inscriptions, abbreviated CIL), Berlin-Brandenburgische Akademie der Wissenschaften (1853–present).
- Dictionary of Greek and Roman Geography, William Smith, ed., Little, Brown and Company, Boston (1854).
- Charlton T. Lewis and Charles Short, A Latin Dictionary, Clarendon Press, Oxford (1879).
- George Davis Chase, "The Origin of Roman Praenomina", in Harvard Studies in Classical Philology, vol. VIII, pp. 103–184 (1897).
- Harper's Dictionary of Classical Literature and Antiquities, Harry Thurston Peck, ed. (Second Edition, 1897).
