= Etruscan civilization =

Pre-Roman civilization of Etruria (9th–1st century BC)

Etruscans: 𐌀𐌍𐌍𐌄𐌔𐌀𐌓; Rasenna
- 900 BC – 27 BC
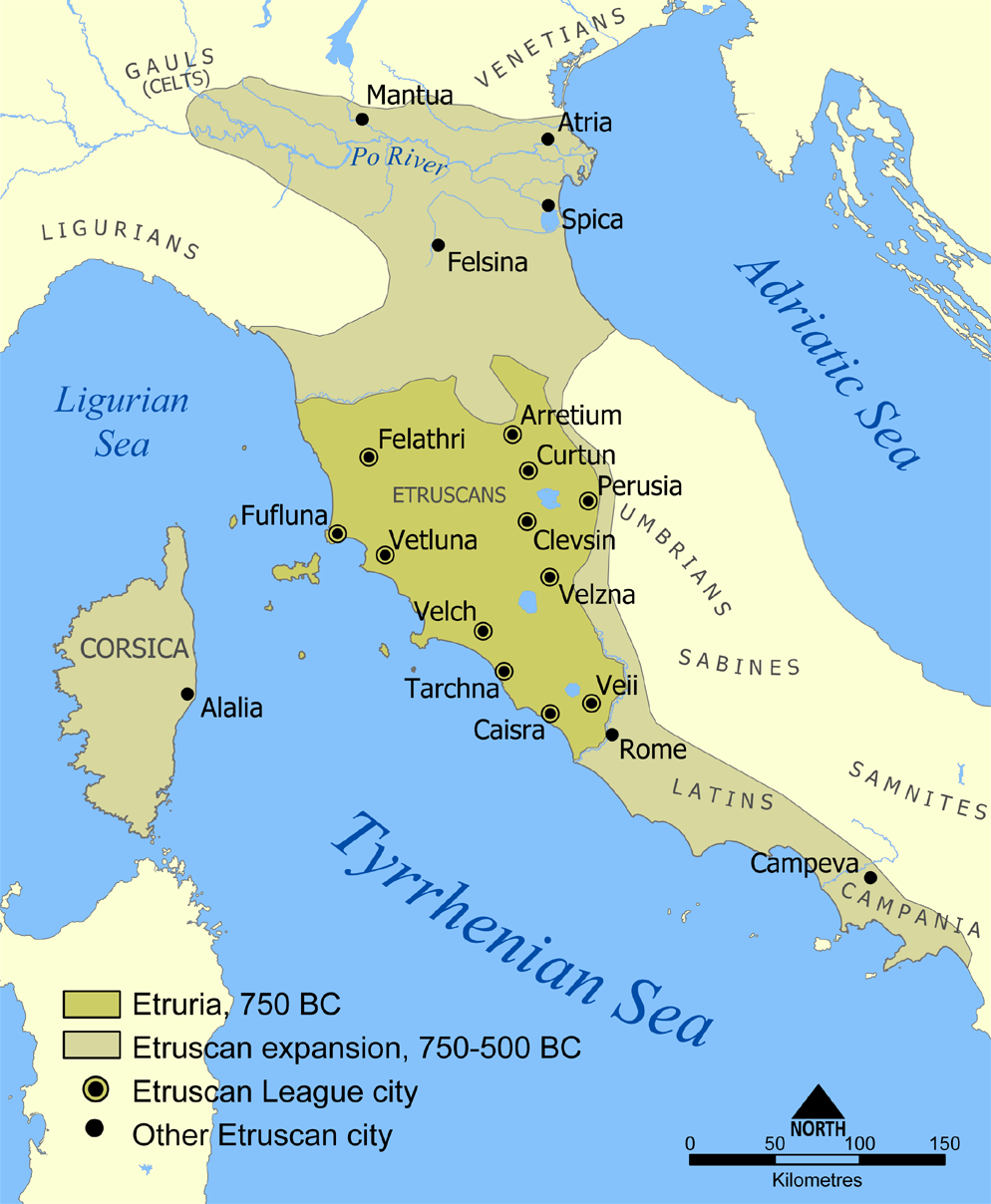
- Extent of Etruscan civilization and the twelve Etruscan League cities
- Status: City-states
- Common languages: Etruscan
- Religion: Etruscan
- Government: Chiefdom
- Legislature: Etruscan League
- Historical era: Iron Age, Ancient history
  - Villanovan culture: 900 BC
  - Last Etruscan cities formally absorbed by Rome: 27 BC
- Currency: Etruscan coinage (5th century BC onward)
Preceded by	Succeeded by
Proto-Villanovan culture	Roman Republic
- Today part of: Italy; Vatican City; San Marino; Corsica

The Etruscans (/ɪˈtrʌskən/ ih-TRUSK-ən) created a civilization in Etruria, in ancient Italy, with a common language and culture, and formed a federation of city-states. After adjacent lands had been conquered, its territory covered, at its greatest extent, roughly what is now Tuscany, western Umbria and northern Lazio, as well as what are now the Po Valley, Emilia-Romagna, south-eastern Lombardy, southern Veneto and western Campania.

A large body of literature has flourished on the origins of the Etruscans, and the consensus among modern scholars is that the Etruscans were an indigenous population. The earliest evidence of a culture that is identifiably Etruscan dates from about 900 BC. This is the period of the Iron Age Villanovan culture, considered to be the earliest phase of Etruscan civilization, which itself developed from the previous late Bronze Age Proto-Villanovan culture in the same region, part of the central European Urnfield culture system.

The territorial extent of Etruscan civilization reached its maximum around 500 BC, shortly after the Roman Kingdom became the Roman Republic. Beginning in the late 4th century BC, it succumbed to the expanding Rome during the Roman–Etruscan Wars; Etruscans were granted Roman citizenship in 90 BC, and by 27 BC the whole Etruscan territory was incorporated into the newly established Roman Empire.

Its culture flourished in three confederacies of cities: Etruria (Tuscany, Latium and Umbria); the Po Valley, including the eastern Alps; and Campania. The league in northern Italy is mentioned by Livy in his Ab Urbe Condita. In the Etruscan political system, authority resided with individual cities and likely with individual families. At the height of Etruscan power, elite Etruscan families grew very rich through trade with the Celts to the north and the Greeks to the south, and they filled their large family tombs with imported luxuries.

The earliest known examples of Etruscan writing are inscriptions found in southern Etruria that date to around 700 BC. The Etruscans developed a system of writing derived from the Euboean alphabet, which was used in the Magna Graecia coastal areas in Southern Italy. The Etruscan language remains only partly understood, making modern understanding of their society and culture heavily dependent on much later and generally disapproving Roman and Greek sources.

== Legend and history ==
=== Ethnonym and etymology ===
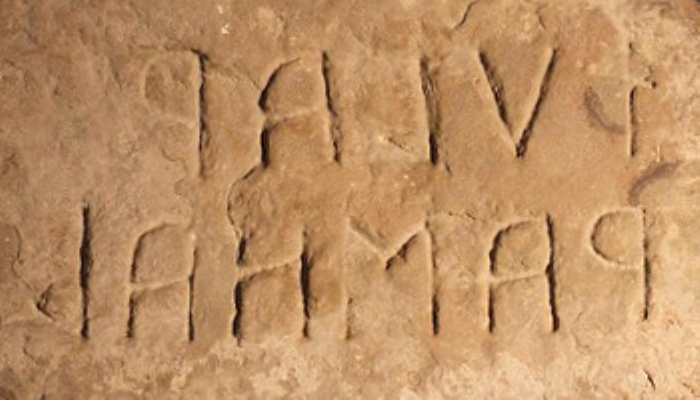
Boundary stone from Cortona Etruscan: Tular Rasnal English: Boundary of the People

According to Dionysius of Halicarnassus, the Etruscans called themselves Rasenna (Greek Ῥασέννα), a stem from the Etruscan rasna (𐌛𐌀𐌔𐌍𐌀), "the people". Evidence of inscriptions as tular rasnal (𐌕𐌖𐌋𐌀𐌛 𐌛𐌀𐌔𐌍𐌀𐌋, "boundary of the people") or mechlum rasnal (𐌌𐌄𐌙𐌋 𐌛𐌀𐌔𐌍𐌀𐌋, "community of the people") attest to its autonym usage. The Tyrsenian etymology, however, remains unknown.

In Attic Greek, the Etruscans were known as Tyrrhenians (Τυρρηνοί, Tyrrhēnoi, earlier Τυρσηνοί Tyrsēnoi), from which the Romans derived the names Tyrrhēnī, Tyrrhēnia (Etruria), and Mare Tyrrhēnum (Tyrrhenian Sea).

The ancient Romans referred to the Etruscans as the Tuscī or Etruscī (singular Tuscus). Their Roman name is the origin of the terms Toscana, which refers to their heartland, and Etruria, which can refer to their wider region. The term Tusci is thought by linguists to have been the Umbrian word for Etruscan, based on an inscription on an ancient bronze tablet from a nearby region. The inscription contains the phrase turskum ... nomen, literally "the Tuscan name". Based on knowledge of Umbrian grammar, linguists can infer that the base form of the word turskum is *Tursci, which would, through metathesis and a word-initial epenthesis, be likely to lead to the form, E-trus-ci.

As for the original meaning of the root, *Turs-, a widely cited hypothesis is that it, like the Latin turris, means "tower" and comes from the ancient Greek word for tower: τύρσις, likely a loan into Greek. In this hypothesis, the Tusci were called the "people who build towers" or "the tower builders". This proposed etymology is made the more plausible because the Etruscans preferred to build their towns on high precipices reinforced by walls. Alternatively, Giuliano and Larissa Bonfante have speculated that Etruscan houses may have seemed like towers to the simple Latins. The proposed etymology has a long history, with Dionysius of Halicarnassus having observed in the first century BC, "[T]here is no reason that the Greeks should not have called [the Etruscans] by this name, both from their living in towers and from the name of one of their rulers." In his recent Etymological Dictionary of Greek, Robert Beekes claims the Greek word is a "loanword from a Mediterranean language", a hypothesis that goes back to an article by Paul Kretschmer in Glotta from 1934.

=== Origins ===
==== Ancient sources ====
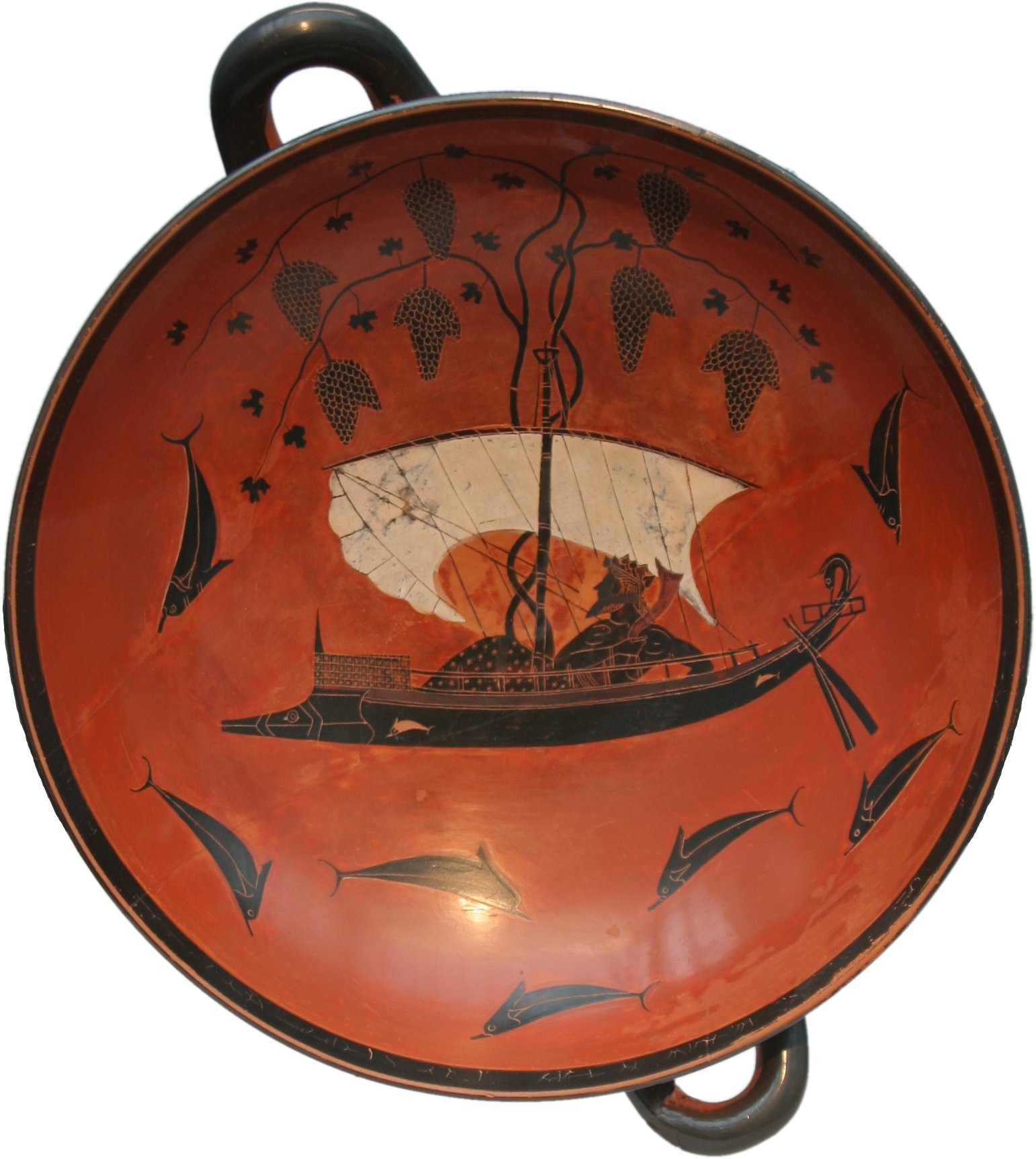
The Dionysus Cup, a kylix painted by the Athenian Exekias ca. 530 BCE, showing the narrative of Dionysus's capture by Tyrrhenian pirates and transfiguration of them into dolphins in the seventh Homeric Hymn

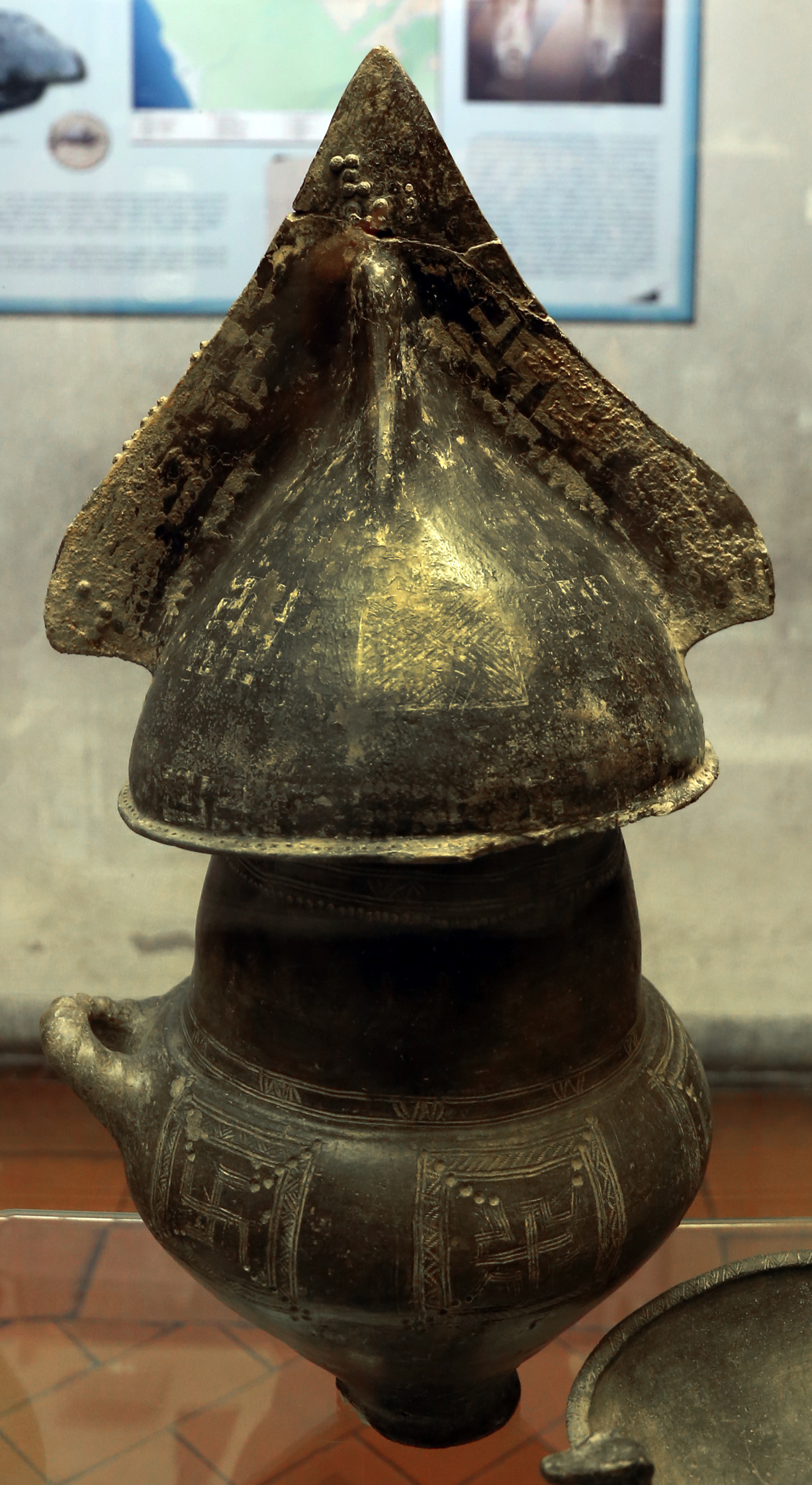
Biconical cinerary urn with crest-shaped helmet lid, 9th–8th century BC, from Monterozzi (Fontanaccia), Tarquinia, Tarquinia National Museum

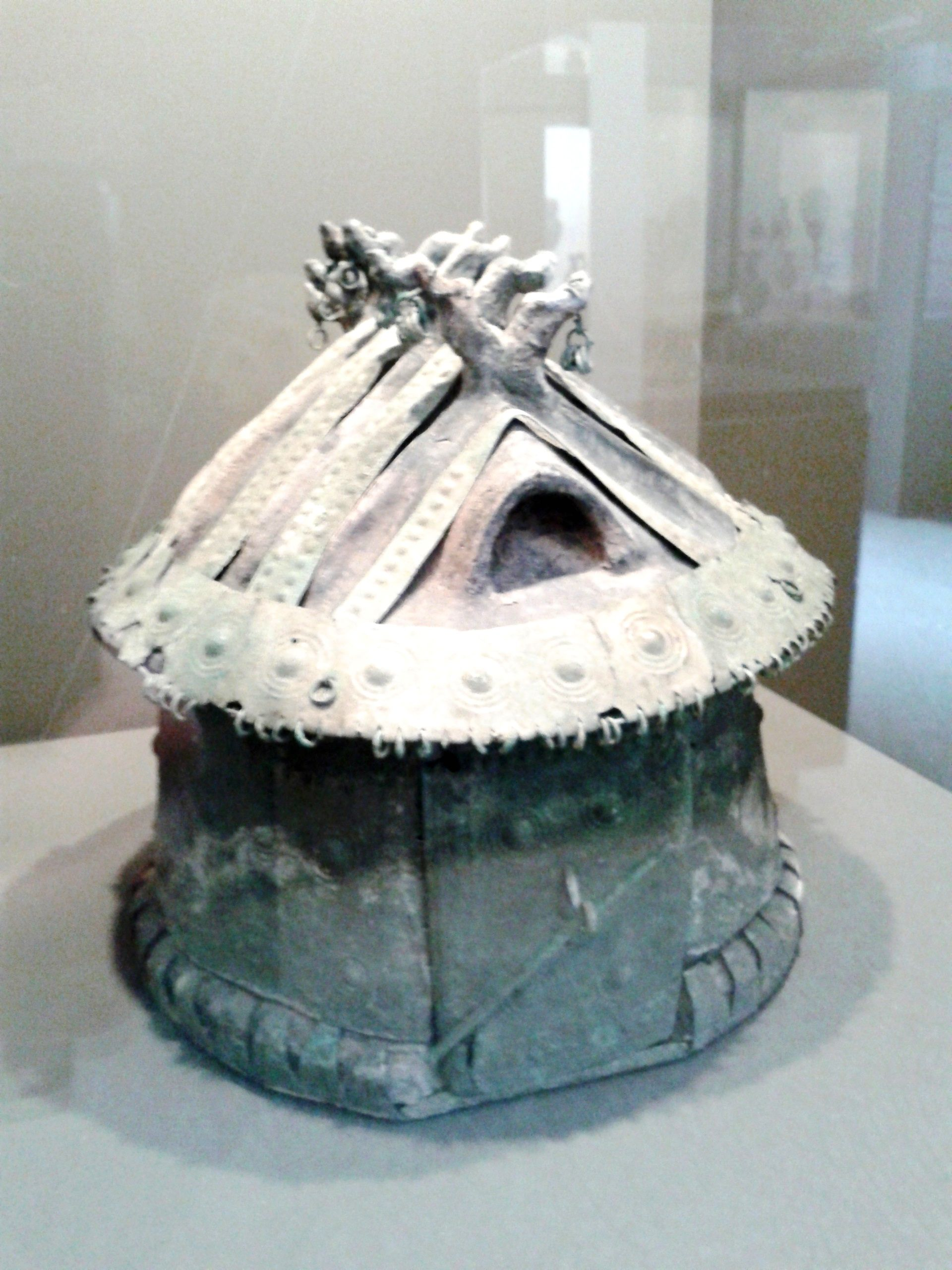
Urn in the shape of a hut, which represents the typical Etruscan house of the Villanovan phase, 8th century BC, from Vulci, Musée d'art et d'histoire de Genève

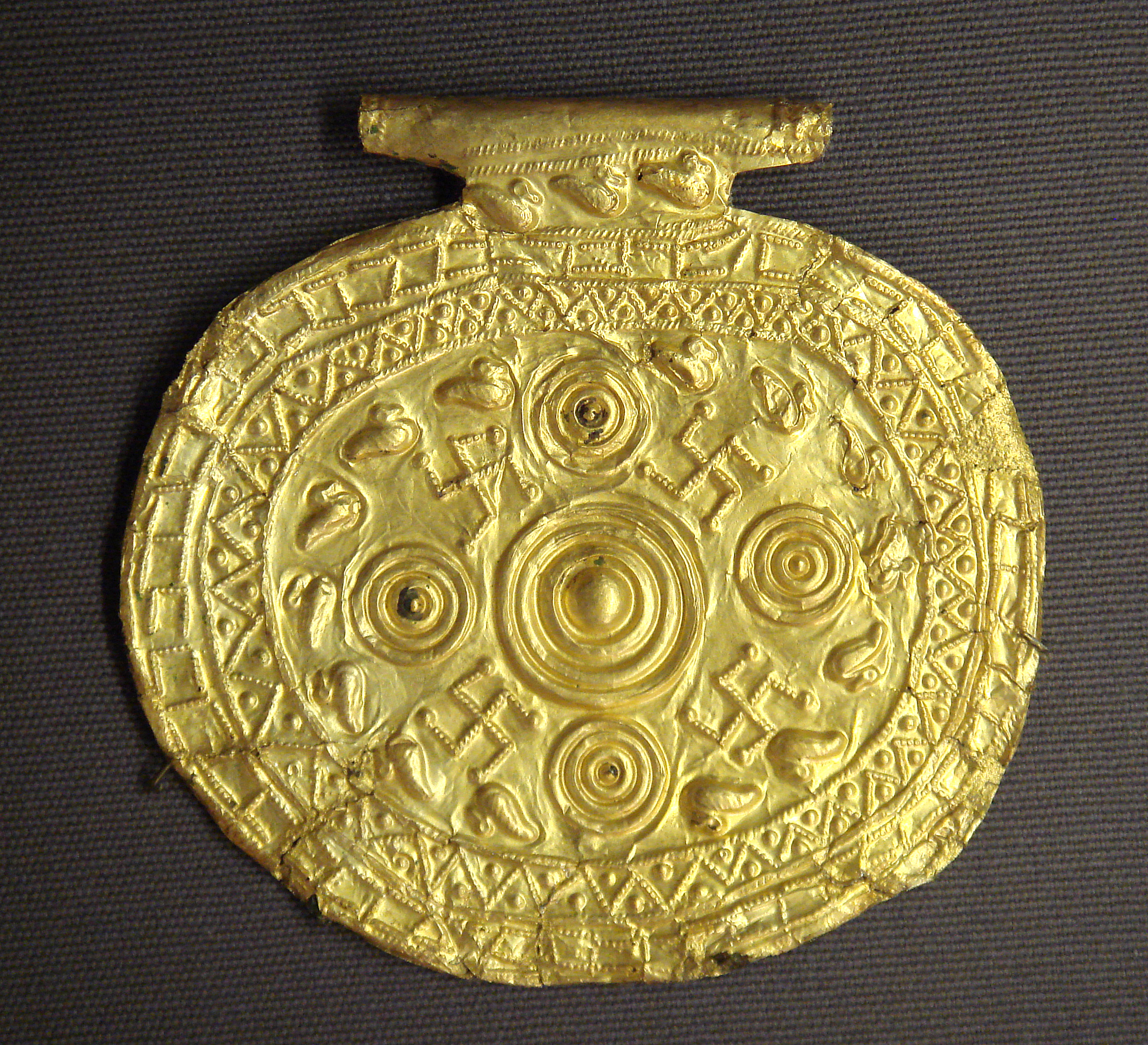
Etruscan pendant with a large equilateral cross of concentric circles flanked by four small right-facing swastikas among its symbols from Bolsena, Italy, 700–650 BC. Louvre

Literary and historical texts in the Etruscan language have not survived, and the language itself is only partially understood by modern scholars. This makes modern understanding of their society and culture heavily dependent on much later and generally disapproving Roman and Greek sources. These ancient writers differed in their theories about the origin of the Etruscan people. Some have suggested that they were indigenous to central Italy, while others have hypothesized that they were Pelasgians.

The first Greek author to mention the Etruscans, whom the Ancient Greeks called Tyrrhenians, was the 8th-century BC poet Hesiod in his work the Theogony. He mentioned them as residing in central Italy alongside the Latins. The 7th-century BC Homeric Hymn to Dionysus referred to them as pirates.

In the 5th century BC, some Greek writers began to associate "Tyrrhenians" and Pelasgians, with some using these terms merely as generic labels for "non-Greeks" and for the supposed indigenous ancestors of the Greeks. The logographer Hellanicus of Lesbos, derived the Tyrrhenians from a Pelasgian migration from Thessaly that colonized the region he called Tyrrhenia. Myrsilus of Lesbos, as quoted by Dionysius of Halicarnassus, proposed the reverse account: the Tyrrhenians originated in Italy and, after leaving their homeland, became known as Pelargi (later identified with the Pelasgians) as they migrated into Greece and other regions.

Herodotus also placed the origins of the Tyrrhenians in the East. In an account explicitly attributed to the Lydians themselves, part of the people of Lydia, led by Tyrrhenus, son of king Atys, emigrated by sea and settled in central Italy, where they took their leader's name.

The emigrants went down to Smyrna and built ships, and sailed away in search of a livelihood. After passing many nations, they came to the land of the Ombricans, where they built cities and have lived ever since. They no longer called themselves Lydians, but after the name of the king's son who led them out, they called themselves Tyrrhenians.

Later Greek authors combined and reworked these stories, often inconsistently. Thucydides and Strabo associated the Tyrrhenians with the Pelasgians of Lemnos, and Strabo had the Pelasgians of Lemnos and Imbros follow Tyrrhenus to Italy. In this literature "Tyrrhenian", like "Pelasgian", was a fluid label applied to various non-Greek peoples of the northern Aegean, such as a group near Creston in Macedonia mentioned by Herodotus and the mixed "Pelasgian Tyrrhenian" population of the Athos peninsula described by Thucydides; these notices reflect the vagueness of the ethnonyms rather than any documented migration of the Etruscans.

A separate strand of the question is linguistic. The Lemnos stele is inscribed in a language structurally close to Etruscan, which has led modern scholars to posit a Tyrsenian language family linking Etruscan, Lemnian and the Alpine Raetic. This is a matter of language classification, however, and does not in itself confirm the ancient migration narratives: the nature, direction and date of the connection remain debated.

However, the 1st-century BC historian Dionysius of Halicarnassus, a Greek living in Rome, dismissed many of the ancient theories of other Greek historians and postulated that the Etruscans were indigenous people who had always lived in Etruria and were different from both the Pelasgians and the Lydians. Dionysius noted that the 5th-century historian Xanthus of Lydia, who was originally from Sardis and was regarded as an important source and authority for the history of Lydia, never suggested a Lydian origin of the Etruscans and never named Tyrrhenus as a ruler of the Lydians.

For this reason, therefore, I am persuaded that the Pelasgians are a different people from the Tyrrhenians. And I do not believe, either, that the Tyrrhenians were a colony of the Lydians; for they do not use the same language as the latter, nor can it be alleged that, though they no longer speak a similar tongue, they still retain some other indications of their mother country. For they neither worship the same gods as the Lydians nor make use of similar laws or institutions, but in these very respects they differ more from the Lydians than from the Pelasgians. Indeed, those probably come nearest to the truth who declare that the nation migrated from nowhere else, but was native to the country, since it is found to be a very ancient nation and to agree with no other either in its language or in its manner of living.

The credibility of Dionysius of Halicarnassus is arguably bolstered by the fact that he was the first ancient writer to report the endonym of the Etruscans: Rasenna.

The Romans, however, give them other names: from the country they once inhabited, named Etruria, they call them Etruscans, and from their knowledge of the ceremonies relating to divine worship, in which they excel others, they now call them, rather inaccurately, Tusci, but formerly, with the same accuracy as the Greeks, they called them Thyrscoï [an earlier form of Tusci]. Their own name for themselves, however, is the same as that of one of their leaders, Rasenna.

Similarly, the 1st-century BC historian Livy, in his Ab Urbe Condita Libri, said that the Rhaetians were Etruscans who had been driven into the mountains by the invading Gauls, and he asserted that the inhabitants of Raetia were of Etruscan origin.

The Alpine tribes have also, no doubt, the same origin (of the Etruscans), especially the Raetians; who have been rendered so savage by the very nature of the country as to retain nothing of their ancient character save the sound of their speech, and even that is corrupted.

The first-century historian Pliny the Elder also put the Etruscans in the context of the Rhaetian people to the north, and wrote in his Natural History (AD 79):

Adjoining these the (Alpine) Noricans are the Raeti and Vindelici. All are divided into a number of states. The Raeti are believed to be people of Tuscan race driven out by the Gauls, their leader was named Raetus.

==== Archaeological evidence and modern Etruscology ====
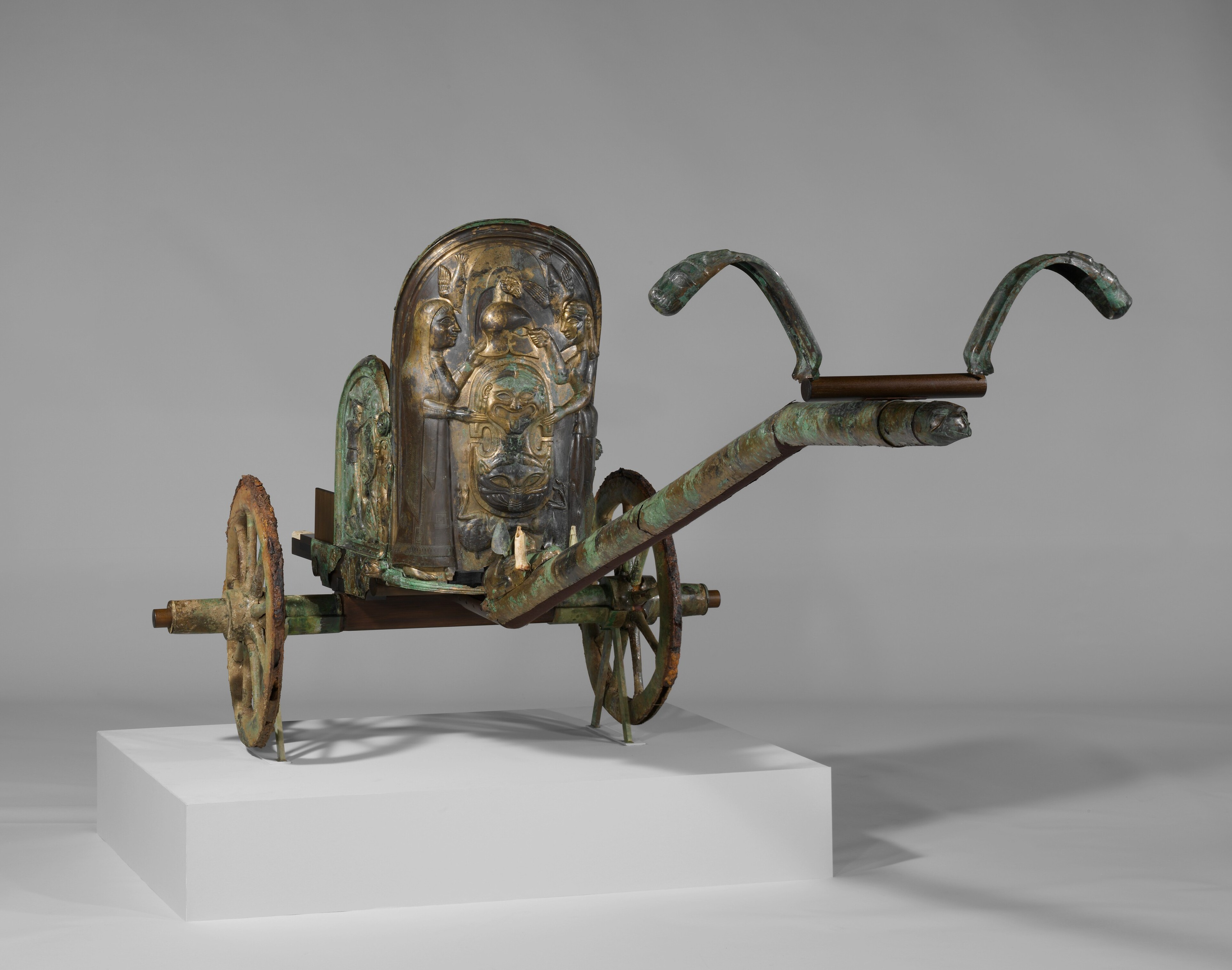
Monteleone chariot, one of the world's great archaeological finds, 2nd quarter of the 6th century BC

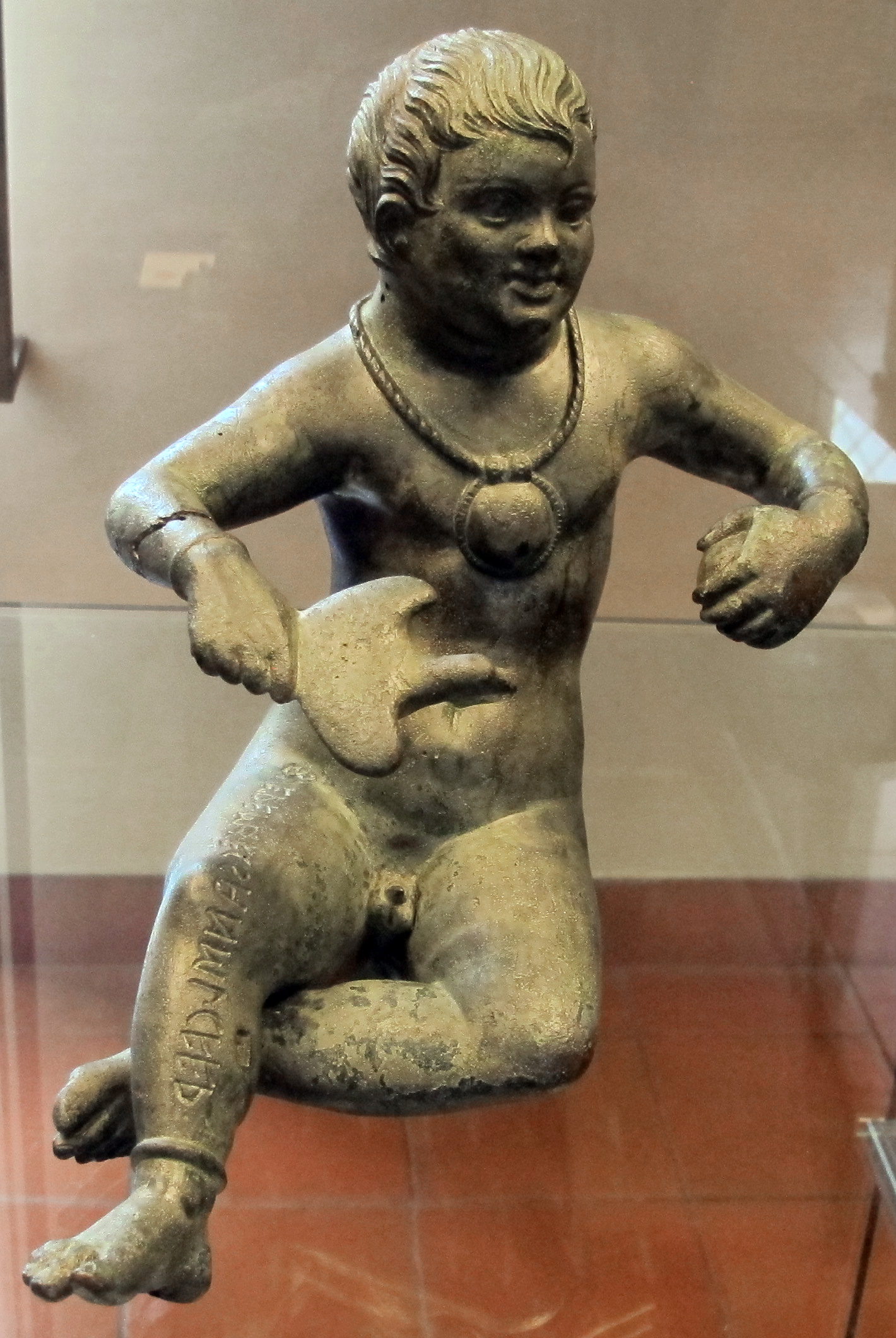
Putto Graziani, hollow-cast bronze on which is engraved the Etruscan inscription "To the god Tec Sans as a gift" (Tec Sans was the protectress of childhood), 3-2nd century BC, Rome, Museo Gregoriano Etrusco

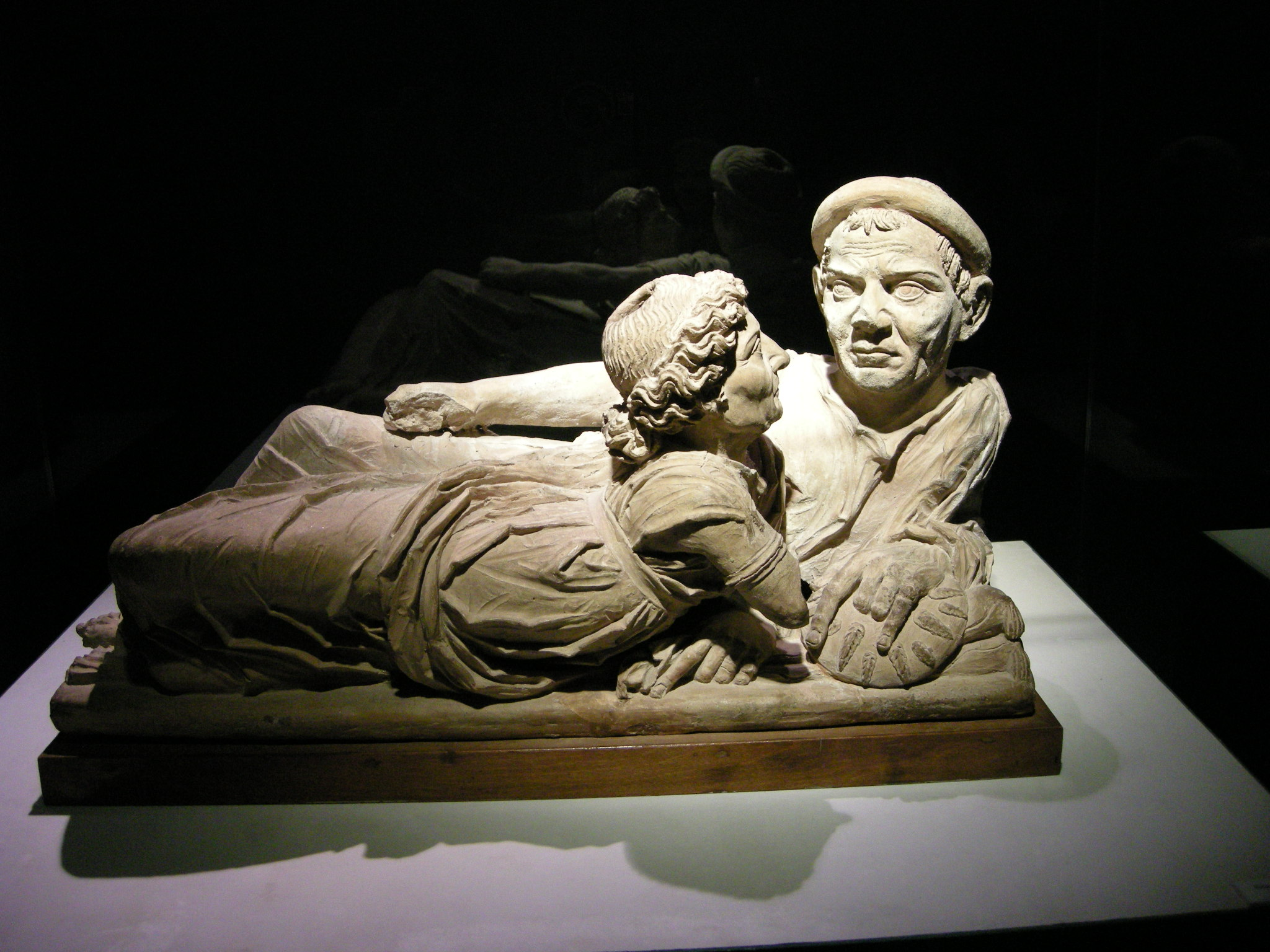
Sarcophagus of the Spouses, about 1st century BC, Volterra, Museo etrusco Guarnacci

The question of the Etruscans' origins has long been a subject of interest and debate among historians. In modern times, all the evidence gathered by prehistoric and protohistoric archaeologists, anthropologists, and Etruscologists points to an autochthonous origin of the Etruscans. There is no archaeological or linguistic evidence of a migration of the Lydians or Pelasgians into Etruria. Modern Etruscologists and archaeologists, such as Massimo Pallottino (1947), have shown that early historians' assumptions and assertions on the subject were groundless. In 2000, the Etruscologist Dominique Briquel explained in detail why he believes that ancient Greek narratives on Etruscan origins should not even count as historical documents. He argues that the ancient story of the Etruscans' "Lydian origins" was a deliberate, politically motivated fabrication, and that ancient Greeks inferred a connection between the Tyrrhenians and the Pelasgians solely on the basis of certain Greek and local traditions and because there had been trade between the Etruscans and Greeks. He noted that, even if these stories include historical facts suggesting contact, such contact is more plausibly traceable to cultural exchange than to migration.

Several archaeologists specializing in Prehistory and Protohistory who have analyzed Bronze Age and Iron Age remains that were excavated in the territory of historical Etruria have pointed out that no evidence has been found, related either to material culture or to social practices, to support a migration theory. The most marked and radical change that has been archaeologically attested in the area is the adoption, starting in about the 12th century BC, of the funeral rite of incineration in terracotta urns, a Continental European practice derived from the Urnfield culture; nothing about it suggests an ethnic contribution from Asia Minor or the Near East.

A 2012 survey of the previous 30 years' archaeological findings based on excavations of the major Etruscan cities showed a continuity of culture from the last phase of the Bronze Age (13th–11th century BC) to the Iron Age (10th–9th century BC). This is evidence that the Etruscan civilization, which emerged around 900 BC, was built by people whose ancestors had inhabited that region for at least the previous 200 years. Based on this cultural continuity, there is now a consensus among archaeologists that Proto-Etruscan culture developed, during the last phase of the Bronze Age, from the indigenous Proto-Villanovan culture and that the subsequent Iron Age Villanovan culture is most accurately described as an early phase of the Etruscan civilization. It is possible that there were contacts between northern-central Italy and the Mycenaean world at the end of the Bronze Age, but contacts between the inhabitants of Etruria and inhabitants of Greece, Aegean Sea Islands, Asia Minor, and the Near East are attested only centuries later, when Etruscan civilization was already flourishing and Etruscan ethnogenesis was well established. The first of these attested contacts relate to the Greek colonies in Southern Italy and Phoenician-Punic colonies in Sardinia, and the consequent orientalizing period.

One of the most common mistakes for a long time, even among some scholars of the past, has been to associate the later Orientalizing period of Etruscan civilization with the question of its origins. Orientalization was an artistic and cultural phenomenon that spread among the Greeks themselves and throughout much of the central and western Mediterranean, not only in Etruria. The Etruscan orientalizing period was due, as has been amply demonstrated by archaeologists, to contacts with the Greeks and the Eastern Mediterranean and not to mass migrations. The facial features (the profile, almond-shaped eyes, large nose) in the frescoes and sculptures and the depiction of reddish-brown men and light-skinned women, influenced by archaic Greek art, followed the artistic traditions from the Eastern Mediterranean that had spread even among the Greeks themselves, and to a lesser extent also to several other civilizations in the central and western Mediterranean up to the Iberian Peninsula. Actually, many of the tombs of the Late Orientalizing and Archaic periods, such as the Tomb of the Augurs, the Tomb of the Triclinium and the Tomb of the Leopards, as well as other tombs from the archaic period in the Monterozzi necropolis in Tarquinia, were painted by Greek painters or at least foreign artists. These images have, therefore, a very limited value for a realistic representation of the Etruscan population. It was only from the end of the 4th century BC that evidence of physiognomic portraits began to be found in Etruscan art and Etruscan portraiture became more realistic.

==== Archaeogenetics ====
There have been numerous biological studies on the Etruscan origins, the oldest of which dates to the 1950s, when research was still based on blood tests of modern samples and DNA analysis (including the analysis of ancient samples) was not yet possible. Only very recently, with the development of archaeogenetics, have comprehensive studies containing the whole genome sequencing of Etruscan samples been published, including autosomal DNA and Y-DNA, autosomal DNA being the "most valuable to understand what really happened in an individual's history", as stated by geneticist David Reich, whereas previously studies were based only on mitochondrial DNA analysis, which contains less and limited information.

An archaeogenetic study focusing on Etruscan origins was published in September 2021 in the journal Science Advances and analyzed the autosomal DNA and the uniparental markers (Y-DNA and mtDNA) of 48 Iron Age individuals from Tuscany and Lazio, spanning from 800 to 1 BC and concluded that the Etruscans were autochthonous (locally indigenous) and had a genetic profile similar to their Latin neighbors. In the Etruscan individuals the ancestral component Steppe was present in the same percentages as those found in the previously analyzed Iron Age Latins, and the Etruscan DNA bore no trace of recent admixture with Anatolia and the Eastern Mediterranean. Both Etruscans and Latins were firmly part of the European cluster, west of modern Italians. The Etruscans were a mixture of WHG, EEF and Steppe ancestry; 75% of the Etruscan male individuals were found to belong to haplogroup haplogroup R1b (R1b M269), mostly represented by R1b-P312 and its derived R1b-L2 lineage (a descendant of R1b-U152) "that diffused across Europe alongside steppe-related ancestry in association with the Bell Beaker complex", whilst the most common mitochondrial DNA haplogroup among the Etruscans was H.

The conclusions of the 2021 study are in line with a 2019 study published in the journal Science that analyzed the remains of eleven Iron Age individuals from the areas around Rome, of whom four were Etruscan, one buried in Veio Grotta Gramiccia from the Villanovan era (900-800 BC) and three buried in La Mattonara Necropolis near Civitavecchia from the Orientalizing period (700-600 BC). The study concluded that Etruscans (900–600 BC) and the Latins (900–500 BC) from Latium vetus were genetically similar, with genetic differences between the examined Etruscans and Latins found to be insignificant. The Etruscan individuals and contemporary Latins were distinguished from preceding populations of Italy by the presence of c. 30% steppe ancestry. Their DNA was a mixture of two-thirds Copper Age ancestry (EEF + WHG; Etruscans ~66–72%, Latins ~62–75%) and one-third Steppe-related ancestry (Etruscans ~27–33%, Latins ~24–37%). The only sample of Y-DNA belonged to haplogroup J-M12 (J2b-L283), found in an individual dated 700-600 BC, and carried the M314 derived allele also found in a Middle Bronze Age individual from Croatia (1631–1531 BC). The four samples of mtDNA extracted belonged to haplogroups U5a1, H, T2b32, K1a4.

Among the older studies, based only on mitochondrial DNA, a mtDNA study, published in 2018 in the American Journal of Physical Anthropology compared both ancient and modern samples from Tuscany, from Prehistory, the Etruscan age, Roman age, Renaissance and the present day and concluded that the Etruscans appear to be a local population, intermediate between the prehistoric and the other samples, placing them in the temporal network between the Eneolithic Age and the Roman Age.

A couple of mitochondrial DNA studies published in 2013 in the journals PLOS One and American Journal of Physical Anthropology, based on Etruscan samples from Tuscany and Latium, concluded that the Etruscans were an indigenous population, showing that Etruscan mtDNA appears to be very close to a Neolithic population from Central Europe (Germany, Austria, Hungary) and to other Tuscan populations, strongly suggesting that the Etruscan civilization developed locally from the Villanovan culture, as supported by archaeological evidence and anthropological research, and that genetic links between Tuscany and western Anatolia date to at least 5,000 years ago during the Neolithic and the "most likely separation time between Tuscany and Western Anatolia falls around 7,600 years ago", at the time of the migrations of Early European Farmers (EEF) from Anatolia to Europe in the early Neolithic. The ancient Etruscan samples had mitochondrial DNA haplogroups (mtDNA) JT (subclades of J and T) and U5, with a minority of mtDNA H1b.

An mtDNA study published in 2004, based on about 28 samples of individuals who lived from 600 to 100 BC in Veneto, Etruria and Campania, found that the Etruscans had no significant heterogeneity and that all mitochondrial lineages observed among the Etruscan samples appear typically European or West Asian but only a few haplotypes were shared with modern populations. Allele sharing between the Etruscans and modern populations is highest among Germans (seven haplotypes in common), the Cornish from the South West of Britain (five haplotypes in common), the Turks (four haplotypes in common) and the Tuscans (two haplotypes in common). The modern populations with the shortest genetic distance from the ancient Etruscans, based solely on mtDNA and FST, were Tuscans followed by the Turks, other populations from the Mediterranean and the Cornish after. This study was much criticized by other geneticists, because "data represent severely damaged or partly contaminated mtDNA sequences" and "any comparison with modern population data must be considered quite hazardous", and by archaeologists, who argued that the study was not clear-cut and had not provided evidence that the Etruscans were an intrusive population to the European context.

In the collective volume Etruscology published in 2017, British archaeologist Phil Perkins, echoing an article of his from 2009, provides an analysis of the state of DNA studies and writes, "none of the DNA studies to date conclusively prove that [the] Etruscans were an intrusive population in Italy that originated in the Eastern Mediterranean or Anatolia" and "there are indications that the evidence of DNA can support the theory that Etruscan people are autochthonous in central Italy".

In his 2021 book A Short History of Humanity, German geneticist Johannes Krause, codirector of the Max Planck Institute for Evolutionary Anthropology in Jena, concludes that it is likely that the Etruscan language (as well as Basque, Paleo-Sardinian and Minoan) "developed on the continent in the course of the Neolithic Revolution".

=== Periodization of Etruscan civilization ===
The Etruscan civilization begins with the early Iron Age Villanovan culture, regarded as the oldest phase, that occupied a large area of northern and central Italy during the Iron Age. The Etruscans themselves dated their nation's origin to a date corresponding to the 11th or 10th century BC. The Villanovan culture emerges with the phenomenon of regionalization from the late Bronze Age culture called "Proto-Villanovan", part of the central European Urnfield culture system. In the last Villanovan phase, called the recent phase (about 770–730 BC), the Etruscans established relations of a certain consistency with the first Greek immigrants in southern Italy (in Pithecusa and then in Cuma), so much so as to initially absorb techniques and figurative models and soon more properly cultural models, with the introduction, for example, of writing, of a new way of banqueting, of a heroic funerary ideology, that is, a new aristocratic way of life, such as to profoundly change the physiognomy of Etruscan society. Thus, thanks to the growing number of contacts with the Greeks, the Etruscans entered what is called the orientalizing period. In this phase, there was a heavy influence in Greece, most of Italy and some areas of Spain, from the most advanced areas of the eastern Mediterranean and the ancient Near East. Also directly Phoenician, or otherwise Near Eastern, craftsmen, merchants and artists contributed to the spread in southern Europe of Near Eastern cultural and artistic motifs. The last three phases of Etruscan civilization are called, respectively, Archaic, Classical, and Hellenistic, which roughly correspond to the homonymous phases of the ancient Greek civilization.

==== Chronology ====
Etruscan civilization (900–27 BC)	Villanovan period (900–720 BC)	Villanovan I	900–800 BC
Etruscan civilization (900–27 BC)	Villanovan period (900–720 BC)	Villanovan II	800–720 BC
Etruscan civilization (900–27 BC)	Villanovan period (900–720 BC)	Villanovan III (Bologna area)	720–680 BC
Etruscan civilization (900–27 BC)	Villanovan period (900–720 BC)	Villanovan IV (Bologna area)	680–540 BC
Etruscan civilization (900–27 BC)	Orientalizing period (720–580 BC)	Early Orientalizing	720–680 BC
Etruscan civilization (900–27 BC)	Orientalizing period (720–580 BC)	Middle Orientalizing	680–625 BC
Etruscan civilization (900–27 BC)	Orientalizing period (720–580 BC)	Late Orientalizing	625–580 BC
Etruscan civilization (900–27 BC)	Archaic period (580–480 BC)	Archaic	580–480 BC
Etruscan civilization (900–27 BC)	Classical period (480–320 BC)	Classical	480–320 BC
Etruscan civilization (900–27 BC)	Hellenistic period (320–27 BC)	Hellenistic	320–27 BC

=== Expansion ===
Etruscan territories and major spread pathways of Etruscan products

Etruscan expansion was concentrated both in the north, beyond the Apennines, and in Campania, although the Etruscan presence in the Emilia-Romagna area, according to archaeologists, was not due to a recent expansion but to a much older presence. However, it is thought that the political structure of the Etruscan culture was similar to, albeit more aristocratic than, Magna Graecia in the south. The mining and commerce of metal, especially copper and iron, led to an enrichment of the Etruscans and to the expansion of their influence in the Italian peninsula and the western Mediterranean Sea. Here, their interests collided with those of the Greeks, especially in the sixth century BC, when Phocaeans of Italy founded colonies along the coast of Sardinia, Spain and Corsica. This led the Etruscans to ally themselves with Carthage, whose interests also collided with the Greeks.

Around 540 BC, the Battle of Alalia led to a new distribution of power in the western Mediterranean. Though the battle had no clear winner, Carthage managed to expand its sphere of influence at the Greeks' expense, and Etruria saw itself relegated to the northern Tyrrhenian Sea with full ownership of Corsica. From the first half of the 5th century BC, the new political situation meant the beginning of the Etruscan decline after losing their southern provinces. In 480 BC, Etruria's ally Carthage was defeated by a coalition of Magna Graecia cities led by Syracuse, Sicily. A few years later, in 474 BC, Syracuse's tyrant Hiero defeated the Etruscans at the Battle of Cumae. Etruria's influence over the cities of Latium and Campania weakened, and the area was taken over by Romans and Samnites.

In the 4th century BC, Etruria saw a Gallic invasion end its influence over the Po Valley and the Adriatic coast. Meanwhile, Rome had started annexing Etruscan cities. This led to the loss of the northern Etruscan provinces. During the Roman–Etruscan Wars, Etruria was conquered by Rome in the 3rd century BC.

=== Etruscan League ===
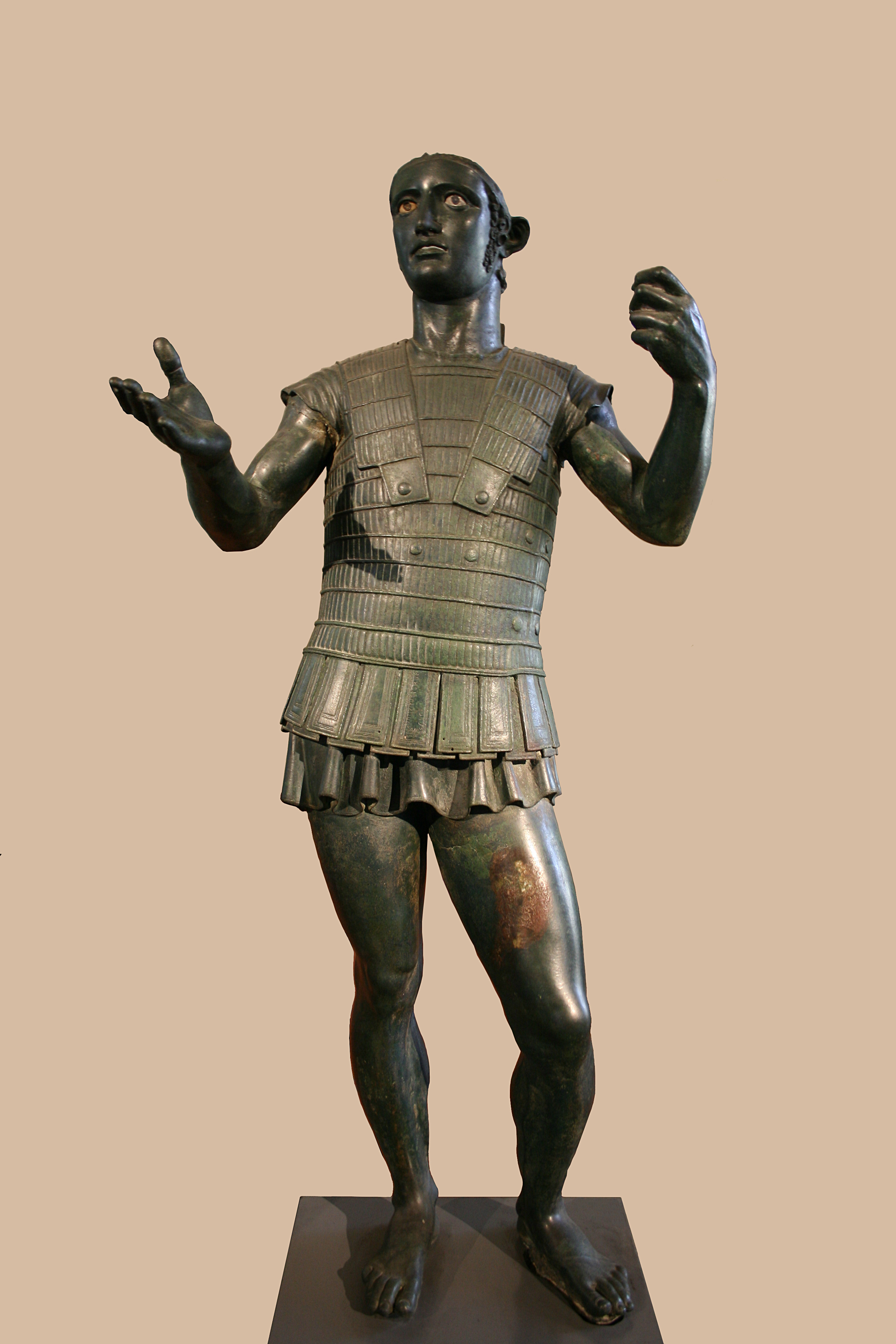
The Mars of Todi, an Etruscan bronze sculpture, c. 400 BC

According to legend, there was a period between 600 BC and 500 BC in which an alliance formed among 12 Etruscan settlements, known today as the Etruscan League, Etruscan Federation, or Dodecapolis (Ancient Greek: Δωδεκάπολις). According to a legend, the Etruscan League of 12 cities was founded by Tarchon and his brother Tyrrhenus. Tarchon lent his name to the city of Tarchna, or Tarquinnii, as it was known by the Romans. Tyrrhenus gave his name to the Tyrrhenians, the alternative name for the Etruscans. Although there is no consensus on which cities were in the league, the following list may be close to the mark: Arretium, Caisra, Clevsin, Curtun, Perusna, Pupluna, Veii, Tarchna, Vetluna, Volterra, Velzna, and Velch. Some modern authors include Rusellae. The league was mostly an economic and religious league, or a loose confederation, similar to the Greek states. During the later imperial times, when Etruria was just one of many regions controlled by Rome, the number of cities in the league increased by three. This is noted on many gravestones from the 2nd century BC onwards. According to Livy, the 12 city-states met once a year at the Fanum Voltumnae at Volsinii, where a leader was chosen to represent the league.

There were two other Etruscan leagues ("Lega dei popoli"): that of Campania, the main city of which was Capua, and the Po Valley city-states in northern Italy, which included Bologna, Spina and Adria.

=== Possible founding of Rome ===
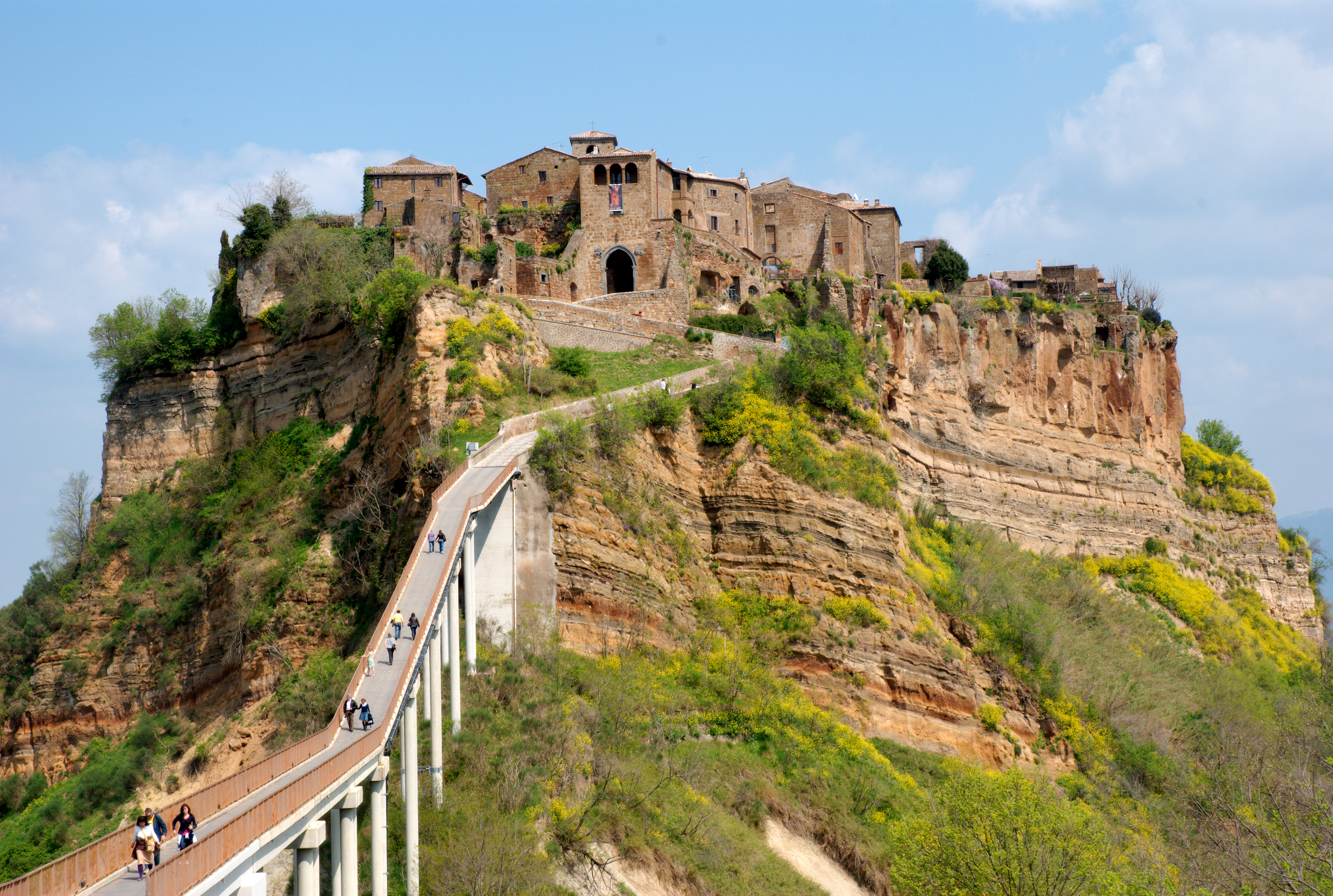
A former Etruscan walled town, Civita di Bagnoregio

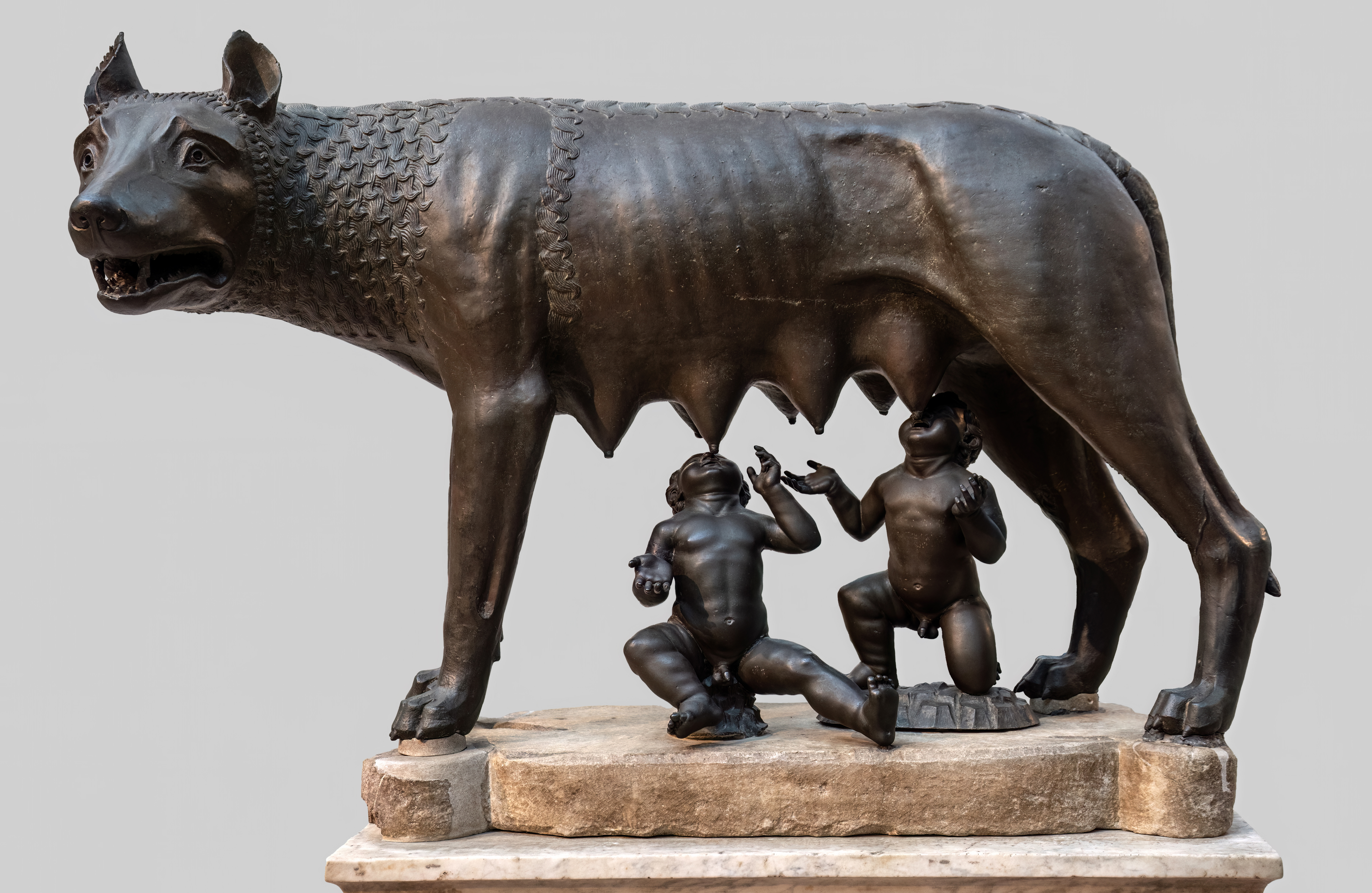
The Capitoline Wolf, long considered an Etruscan bronze, feeding the twins Romulus and Remus

Those who subscribe to a Latin foundation of Rome followed by an Etruscan invasion typically speak of an Etruscan "influence" on Roman culture – that is, cultural objects which were adopted by Rome from neighboring Etruria. The prevailing view is that Rome was founded by Latins who later merged with Etruscans. In this interpretation, Etruscan cultural objects are considered influences rather than part of a heritage. Rome was probably a small settlement until the arrival of the Etruscans, who constructed the first elements of its urban infrastructure such as the drainage system.

The main criterion for deciding whether an object originated at Rome and traveled by influence to the Etruscans, or descended to the Romans from the Etruscans, is date. Many, if not most, of the Etruscan cities were older than Rome. If one finds that a given feature was there first, it cannot have originated at Rome. A second criterion is the opinion of the ancient sources. These would indicate that certain institutions and customs came directly from the Etruscans. Rome is located on the edge of what was Etruscan territory. When Etruscan settlements turned up south of the border, it was presumed that the Etruscans spread there after the foundation of Rome, but the settlements are now known to have preceded Rome.

Etruscan settlements were frequently built on hills—the steeper the better—and surrounded by thick walls. According to Roman mythology, when Romulus and Remus founded Rome, they did so on the Palatine Hill according to Etruscan ritual; that is, they began with a pomerium or sacred ditch. Then they proceeded to the walls. Romulus was required to kill Remus when the latter jumped over the wall, breaking its magic spell (see also under Pons Sublicius). The name of Rome is attested in Etruscan in the form Ruma-χ meaning 'Roman', a form that mirrors other attested ethnonyms in that language with the same suffix -χ: Velzna-χ '(someone) from Volsinii' and Sveama-χ '(someone) from Sovana'. But this in itself does not prove Etruscan origin conclusively. If Tiberius is from θefarie, then Ruma would have been placed on the Thefar (Tiber) river. A heavily discussed topic among scholars is who was the founding population of Rome. In 390 BC, the city of Rome was attacked by the Gauls, and as a result may have lost many, though not all, of its earlier records.

Later history relates that some Etruscans lived in the Vicus Tuscus, the "Etruscan quarter", and that there was an Etruscan line of kings (albeit ones descended from a Greek, Demaratus of Corinth) that succeeded kings of Latin and Sabine origin. Etruscophile historians argue that this, together with evidence for institutions, religious elements and other cultural elements, proves that Rome was founded by Etruscans.

Under Romulus and Numa Pompilius, the people were said to have been divided into 30 curiae and three tribes. Few Etruscan words entered Latin, but the names of at least two of the tribes—Ramnes and Luceres—seem to be Etruscan. The last kings may have borne the Etruscan title lucumo, while the regalia were traditionally considered of Etruscan origin—the golden crown, the sceptre, the toga palmata (a special robe), the sella curulis (curule chair), and above all the primary symbol of state power: the fasces. The latter was a bundle of whipping rods surrounding a double-bladed axe, carried by the king's lictors. An example of the fasces are the remains of bronze rods and the axe from a tomb in Etruscan Vetulonia. This allowed archaeologists to identify the depiction of a fasces on the grave stele of Avele Feluske, who is shown as a warrior wielding the fasces. The most telling Etruscan feature is the word populus, which appears as an Etruscan deity, Fufluns.

=== Roman families of Etruscan origin ===
- Ancharia gens
- Arruntia gens
- Caecinia gens
- Caelia gens
- Caesennia gens
- Ceionia gens
- Cilnia gens
- Herminia gens – Patrician
- Erucia gens
- Lartia gens – Patrician
- Perpernia gens
- Persia gens
- Rasinia gens
- Sanquinia gens
- Spurinnia gens
- Tapsennia gens
- Tarquinia gens – Patrician (?)
- Tarquitia gens – Patrician
- Urgulania gens
- Verginia gens – Patrician
- Volumnia gens – Patrician

== Society ==
=== Government ===
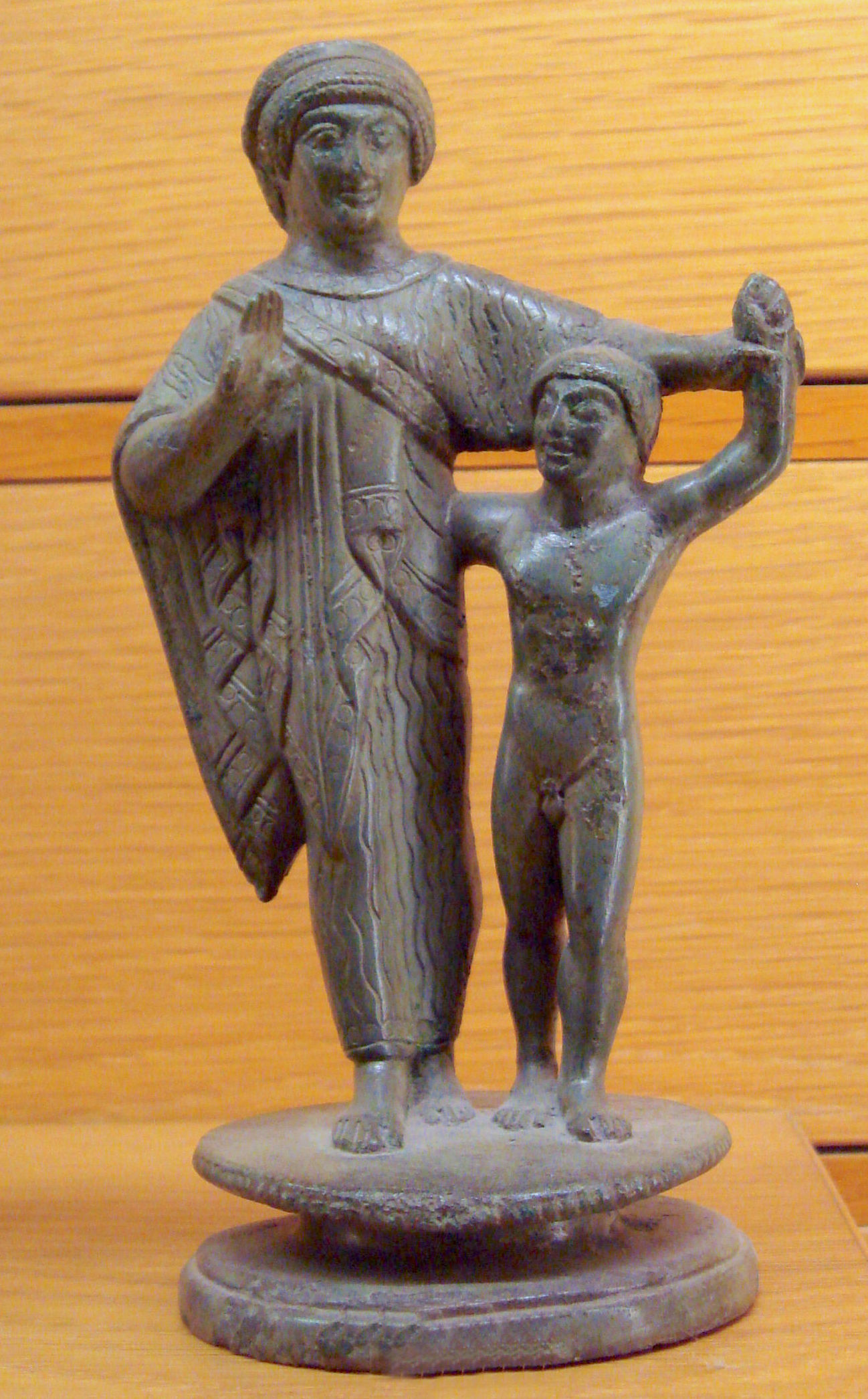
Etruscan mother and child, 500–450 BC

The historical Etruscans had achieved a state system of society, with remnants of the chiefdom and tribal forms. Rome was in a sense the first Italic state, but it began as an Etruscan one. It is believed that the Etruscan government style changed from total monarchy to oligarchic republic (as the Roman Republic) in the 6th century BC.

The government was viewed as being a central authority, ruling over all tribal and clan organizations. It retained the power of life and death; in fact, the gorgon, an ancient symbol of that power, appears as a motif in Etruscan decoration. The adherents to this state power were united by a common religion. Political unity in Etruscan society was the city-state, which was probably the referent of methlum, "district". Etruscan texts name quite a number of magistrates, without much of a hint as to their function: The camthi, the parnich, the purth, the tamera, the macstrev, and so on. The people were the mech.

==== Importance of religion in the government ====
Governments in ancient Mediterranean societies were explicitly interwoven with the religious practices of the contemporary. The Etruscan King lucomo (plural: lucumones), was considered the supreme authority and under the Etruscans' theocratic governmental approach acted as the connection between god and people. The royal title was not just limited to hereditary succession but was also given due to elite lineage, divine sanction and also wealth. This prominence of divine sanction is reflective of the importance of religion in Etruscan governments and as such, all Etruscan kingship was also believed to be under divine approval and held the final word. Roman historian Titus Livius records the story of Lucomo which reflects how the divinity was revered and understood in the Etruscan era as captured by Roman historians. Lucomo was propelled by his wife Tanaquil to acquire power in Rome due to the inability to do so in Etruscan government,(Rome is considered the first Italic state) and on their journey an eagle replaced Lucomo's cap, which was interpreted as an omen from the divine of future kingship.

That such bird had come from such a quarter of the heavens... it had lifted the ornament placed on the head of man, to restore it to the same, by direction of the gods."

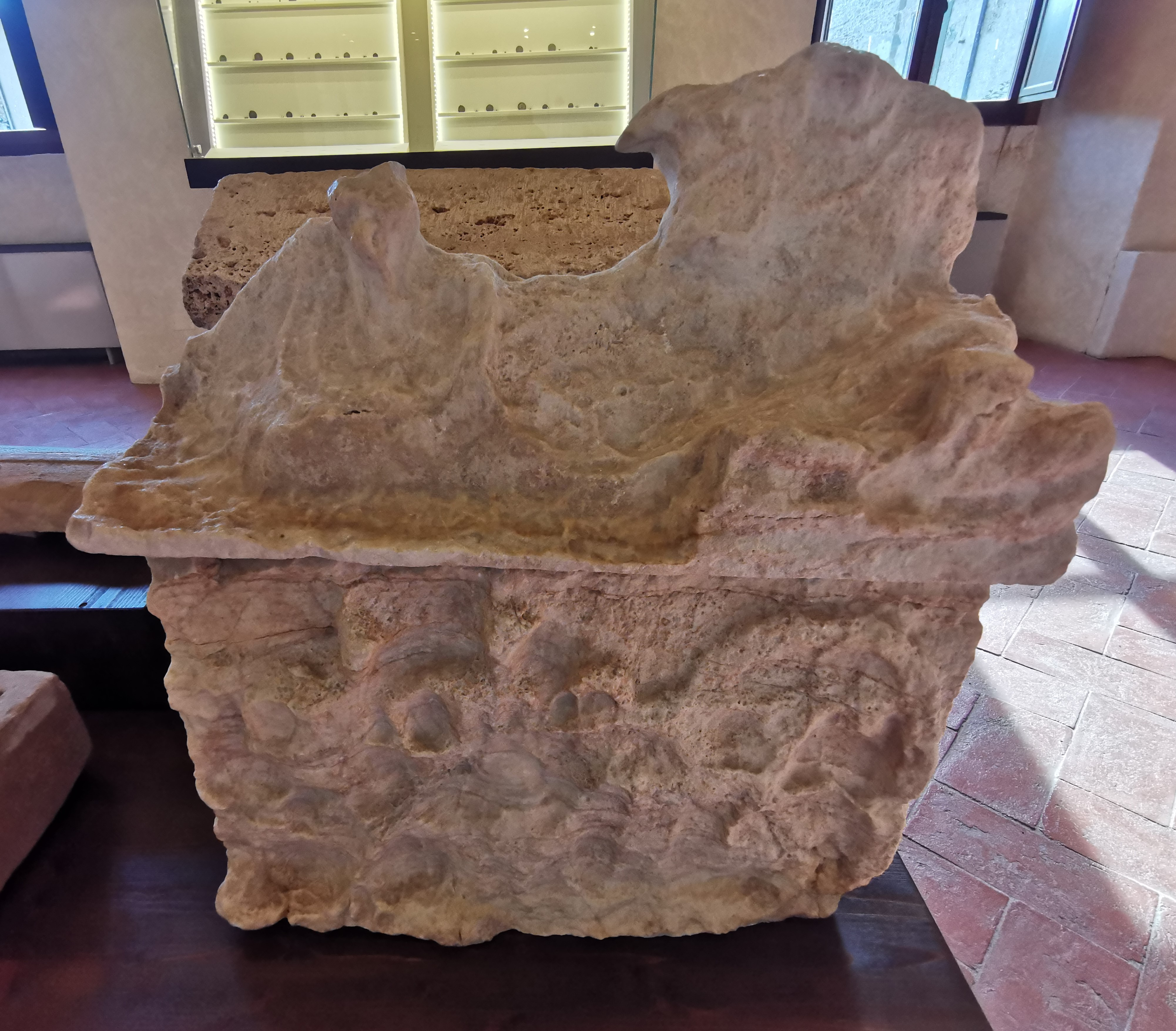
Etruscan tomb

This notion of combined political power and religious authorities held by the kingship is reinforced by Sybille Haynes, an expert on Etruscology, described the lucomo to also be "chief priest." Tombs of the royals found also are engraved with divine symbols, which can be interpreted to understand that kings in this society acted as a connection between humans and the spiritual.

While there was a transition from an absolute monarchy to a republic, religion was deeply intertwined with Etruscan political and governmental identity, as Kings and magistrates worked to ensure peace with the gods by rituals and interpretation of the divine and their will through haruspicy and augury. The haruspices were a group of pristries who by analysis of the celestial signs and animal entrails could deduce the will of the gods. The creation of city-states as Tenney Frank argued took place due to economic and natural advantages, and also due to a need for common tribal meetings in ancient polities. It allowed for a dialogue of ideas to increase communication, and desires and was headed by the zilath mechl rasnal, ("magistrate of the Etruscan people") who as modern scholars have argued functioned largely as a ceremonial leader, rather than a federal executive. Modelling a decentralised theocracy, this role further ties together the idea that Etruscan government was held through shared religious rituals and beliefs.

While Etruscan city states such as Tarquinia and Veii were established as politically autonomous, being centered around aristocratic rule and magistrates, international composition in these states were also considered progressive by scholars and historians. It is often believed, due to the abundance of Greek and Roman sources over Etruscan ones, that women were not allowed participation and enjoyment in public life; however, their society was depicted to revere female gods, and women were allowed to participate in public life. This reverence for female duties can be deduced to understand how gender-diverse spirituality was also an important aspect of Etruscan society.

Political religion also extended to the establishment of the twelve city-states, whose league was called "duodecim populi Etruriae". This league held assemblies annually and selected their zilath mechl rasna at the Fanun Voltumnae, the shrine of Voltuma. Taking place at a sanctuary dedicated to the god Voltuma. These assemblies acted as both political conferences where military and peace talks could be held as well as religious festivals. Foreign policy, related to war, and alliances, were believed to be an outcome of the will of the gods, and discussions regarding this also took place at the yearly assemblies. Mario Torelli articulates that these assemblies served the purpose of ensuing a divine sanction for the actions decided by the collective. Lastly, the importance of religion in these meetings is further emblematic by the appointment of a dictator, who was chosen based on religious rituals to then hold the same supreme authority that the King had enjoyed in early Etruscan civilisation. As such, it can be envisioned that Etruscan policy and assemblies prioritised and revered divine legitimacy, the messages from gods were treated as the ultimate authority and the government's desire to maintain a strong positive relationship is prevalent.

Religion was further embedded into the urban and geographical organisations of city states, and temples became an important political feature where decisions would be made as gods would act as a tool of legitimation. Mario Torelli, an Italian scholar of the culture of Etruscans, notes the intersection of temples as a place of worship and political power, creating the ultimate intersection cultivating an environment of sacred order.

The political and governmental strategies of the Etruscans, with their influence of religion, also left a legacy in Roman religion and statecraft. Roman annexation of Etruscan city states occurred in the 4th and 3rd century BCE, and saw the adoption of many religious-political practices. Practices such as augury and haruspicy remained especially prevalent, as Etruscan haruspices were called upon by the Roman senate reflecting the importance of religion in nation building. As much of what is known about Etruscans comes from Greek and Roman authors, due to the few written records remaining from the Etruscans, it is studied through perspectives other than their own leading to a diminished understanding of religious importance in Etruscan governance.

=== Family ===
The princely tombs were not of individuals. The inscription evidence shows that families were interred there over long periods, marking the growth of the aristocratic family as a fixed institution, parallel to the gens at Rome and perhaps even its model. The Etruscans could have used any model of the eastern Mediterranean. That the growth of this class is related to the new acquisition of wealth through trade is unquestioned. The wealthiest cities were located near the coast. At the center of the society was the married couple, tusurthir. The Etruscans were a monogamous society that emphasized pairing.

Similarly, the behavior of some wealthy women is not uniquely Etruscan. The apparent promiscuous revelry has a spiritual explanation. Swaddling and Bonfante (among others) explain that depictions of the nude embrace, or symplegma, "had the power to ward off evil", as did baring the breast, which was adopted by western culture as an apotropaic device, appearing finally on the figureheads of sailing ships as a nude female upper torso. It is also possible that Greek and Roman attitudes to the Etruscans were based on a misunderstanding of the place of women within their society. In both Greece and the earliest Republican Rome, respectable women were confined to the house and mixed-sex socialising did not occur. Thus, the freedom of women within Etruscan society could have been misunderstood as implying their sexual availability. A number of Etruscan tombs carry funerary inscriptions in the form "X son of (father) and (mother)", indicating the importance of the mother's side of the family.

=== Military ===
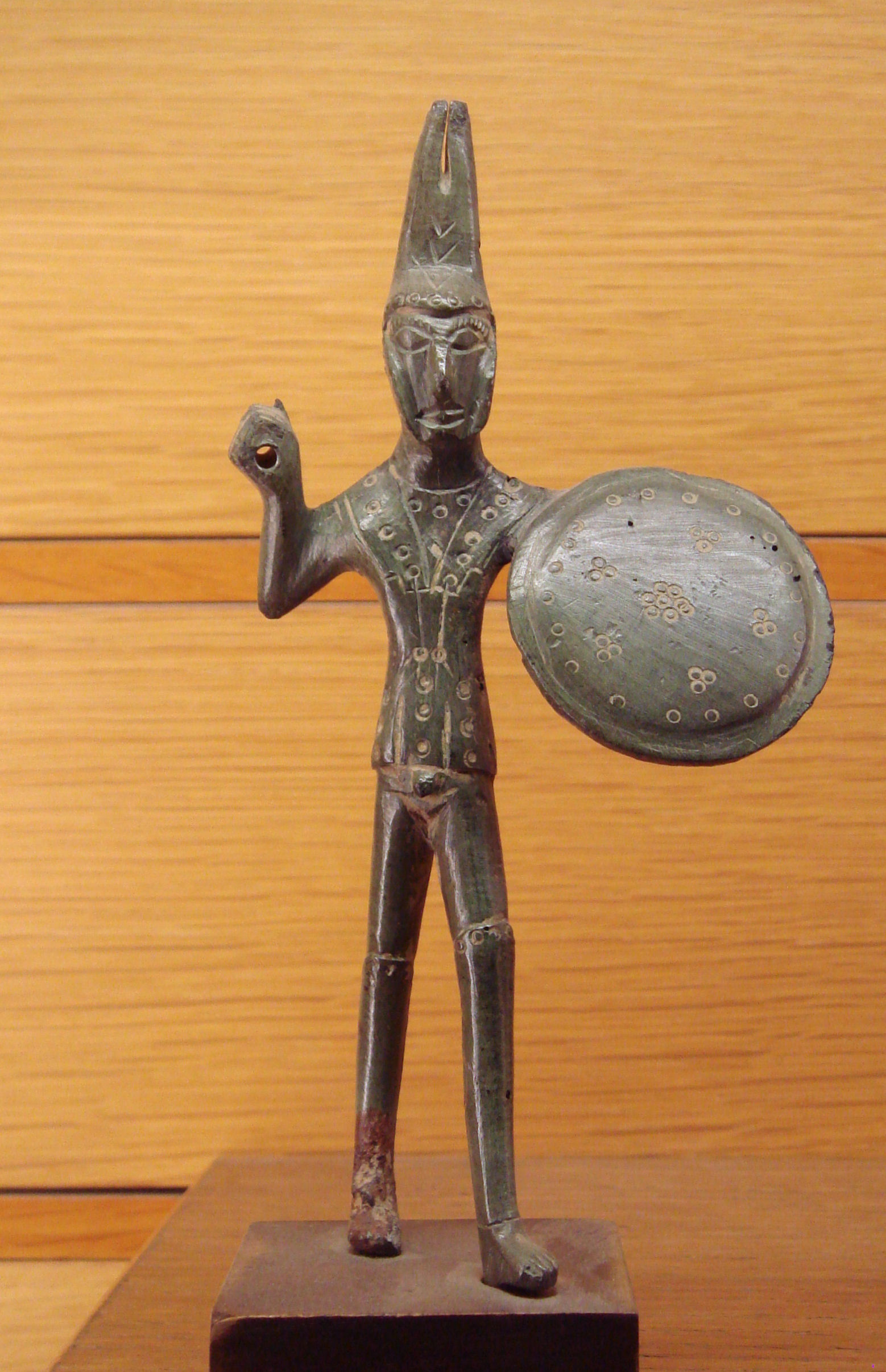
Etruscan warrior, found near Viterbo, Italy, dated c. 500 BC

The Etruscans, like the contemporary cultures of Ancient Greece and Ancient Rome, had a significant military tradition. In addition to marking the rank and power of certain individuals, warfare was a considerable economic advantage to Etruscan civilization. Like many ancient societies, the Etruscans conducted campaigns during summer months, raiding neighboring areas, attempting to gain territory and combating piracy as a means of acquiring valuable resources, such as land, prestige, goods, and slaves. It is likely that individuals taken in battle would be ransomed back to their families and clans at high cost. Prisoners could also potentially be sacrificed on tombs to honor fallen leaders of Etruscan society, not unlike the sacrifices made by Achilles for Patrocles.

- 550 BC: Etruscan-Punic coalition against Greece off the coast of Corsica
- 540 BC: Naval victory at Alalia
- 524 BC: Defeat at Cyme against the Greeks
- 510 BC: Fall of the Etruscan kingship of Lucius Tarquinius Superbus in Rome
- 508 BC: Lars Porsena besieges Rome
- 508 BC: War between Clusium and Aricia
- 482 BC: Beginning of the conflict between Veii and Rome
- 474 BC: Defeat of the Etruscans against Syracuse in the Battle of Cyme (also Cumae)
- 430 BC 406 BC: Defeat against the Samnites in Campania
- 406 BC: Siege of Veii by Rome
- 396 BC: Destruction of Veii by Rome
- from 396 BC: Invasion of the Celts into the Po Valley
- 384 BC: Plunder of Pyrgi (Santa Severa) by Dionysius I of Syracuse
- 358 BC: Alliance of Tarquinia and Cerveteri against Rome
- 310 BC: Defeat against the Romans at Lake Vadimone
- 300 BC: Pyrgi becomes a Roman colony
- 280 BC: Defeat of Vulci against Rome
- 264 BC 100 BC: Defeat of Volsinii against Rome
- 260 BC: Subjugation by the Gauls in the Po Valley
- 205 BC: Support of Scipio in the campaign against Hannibal
- 183 BC: Foundation of the Roman colony in Saturnia
- 90 BC: Granting of Roman citizenship
- 82 BC: Repression of Sulla in Etruria
- 79 BC: Capitulation of Volterra
- from 40 BC: Final Romanization of Etruria

=== Cities ===
The range of Etruscan civilization is marked by its cities. They were entirely assimilated by Italic, Celtic, or Roman ethnic groups, but the names survive from inscriptions and their ruins are of aesthetic and historic interest in most of the cities of central Italy. Etruscan cities flourished over most of Italy during the Roman Iron Age, marking the farthest extent of Etruscan civilization. They were gradually assimilated first by Italics in the south, then by Celts in the north and finally in Etruria itself by the growing Roman Republic.

That many Roman cities were formerly Etruscan was well known to all the Roman authors. Some cities were founded by Etruscans in prehistoric times, and bore entirely Etruscan names. Others were colonized by Etruscans who Etruscanized the name, usually Italic.

== Economy ==
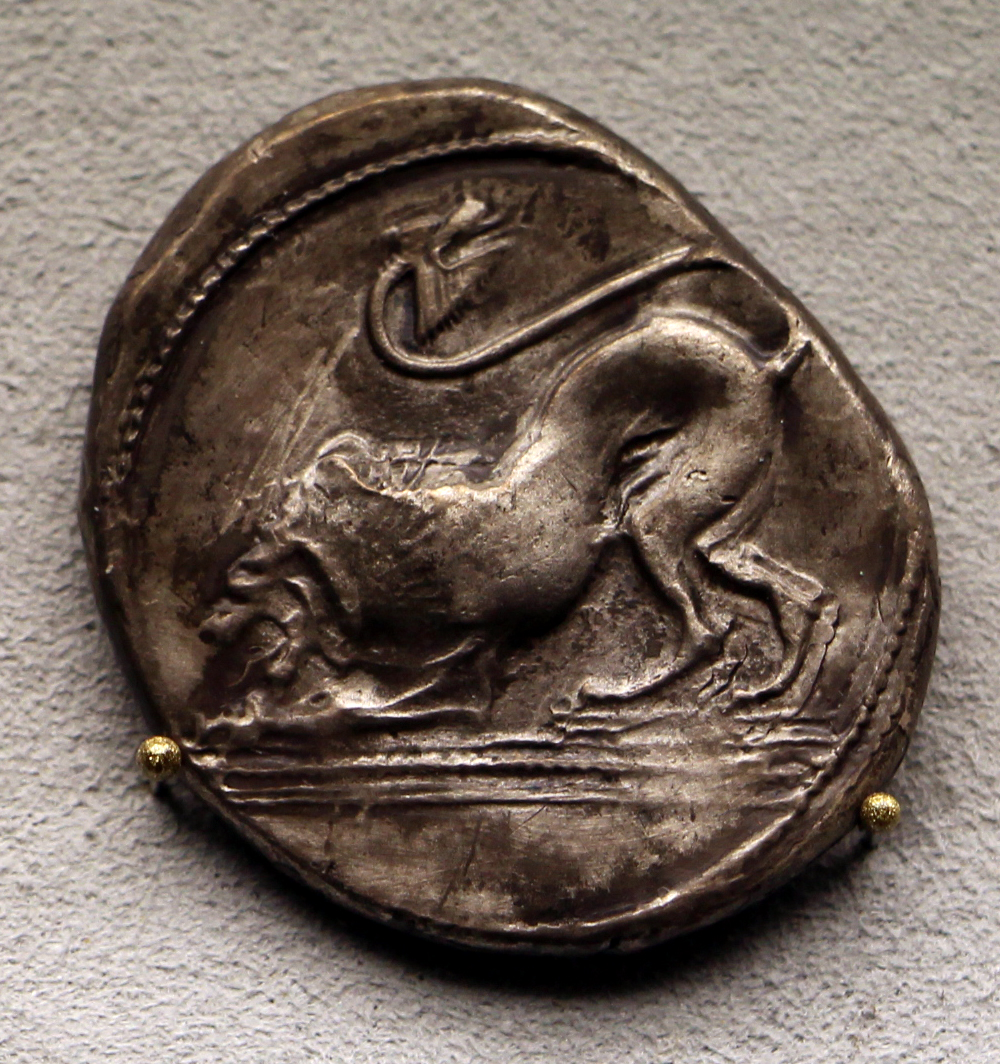
Silver tridrachm of Populonia, 5th century BC. Populonia was the principal Etruscan centre of iron mining and metalworking and one of the first Etruscan cities to mint its own coinage.

The Etruscan economy rested on three principal foundations: agriculture, the exploitation of the region's rich mineral resources together with the working of metals, and Mediterranean trade, the last favoured by the Etruscans' strategic position on the Tyrrhenian coast. Land was regarded as the fundamental source of wealth, but it was above all the mineral riches of the subsoil and the metal trade that gave the coastal cities their exceptional prosperity and drew Greek and Phoenician merchants to Etruria.

=== Agriculture ===
Roman authors repeatedly praised the fertility of Etruria and its abundant grain, in particular spelt (farro), as well as its vineyards, olive groves and figs; according to the ancient sources, cities such as Cerveteri, Roselle, Volterra, Chiusi, Perugia and Arezzo supplied large quantities of grain to Rome, both during the famines of the fifth century BC and to the army of Scipio during the Punic Wars. Irrigation and drainage were specialities of Etruscan engineers: networks of rock-cut underground channels (cuniculi), reached through vertical shafts, drained waterlogged land and carried water where it was needed, as in the territory of Veii, and such works were later continued by the Romans. From the late Archaic period large-scale reclamation and land-division schemes directed by the urban authorities reshaped the countryside, in what has been described as a process of "internal colonization", and encouraged specialized crops such as the vine and the olive, whose wine and oil were also exported.

=== Mining and metalworking ===
A distinctive source of Etruscan wealth was the metal ore of the subsoil, above all the copper and iron of the Colline Metallifere and the iron of the island of Elba. Populonia, described in the ancient sources as the port of ores and metals, became a major centre of iron smelting, and worked metal was both used locally and widely exported, Etruscan bronzes in particular being prized abroad.

=== Trade and coinage ===
From the Orientalizing and Archaic periods the Etruscan cities were closely integrated into Mediterranean exchange: they exported metals, wine and oil, the last documented by the spread of Etruscan transport amphorae, and were a major market for imported Greek pottery. Trade was channelled through coastal emporia placed under the protection of sanctuaries, such as Gravisca, the port of Tarquinia, and Pyrgi, a port of Caere; competition for these routes brought the Etruscans into alliance with Carthage against the Phocaean Greeks, as at the Battle of Alalia. The earliest Etruscan coinage, struck mainly at Populonia, dates from around the fifth century BC, but it remained a limited phenomenon and exchange long relied on bronze by weight, including the so-called ramo secco ingots.

== Culture ==
=== Religion ===
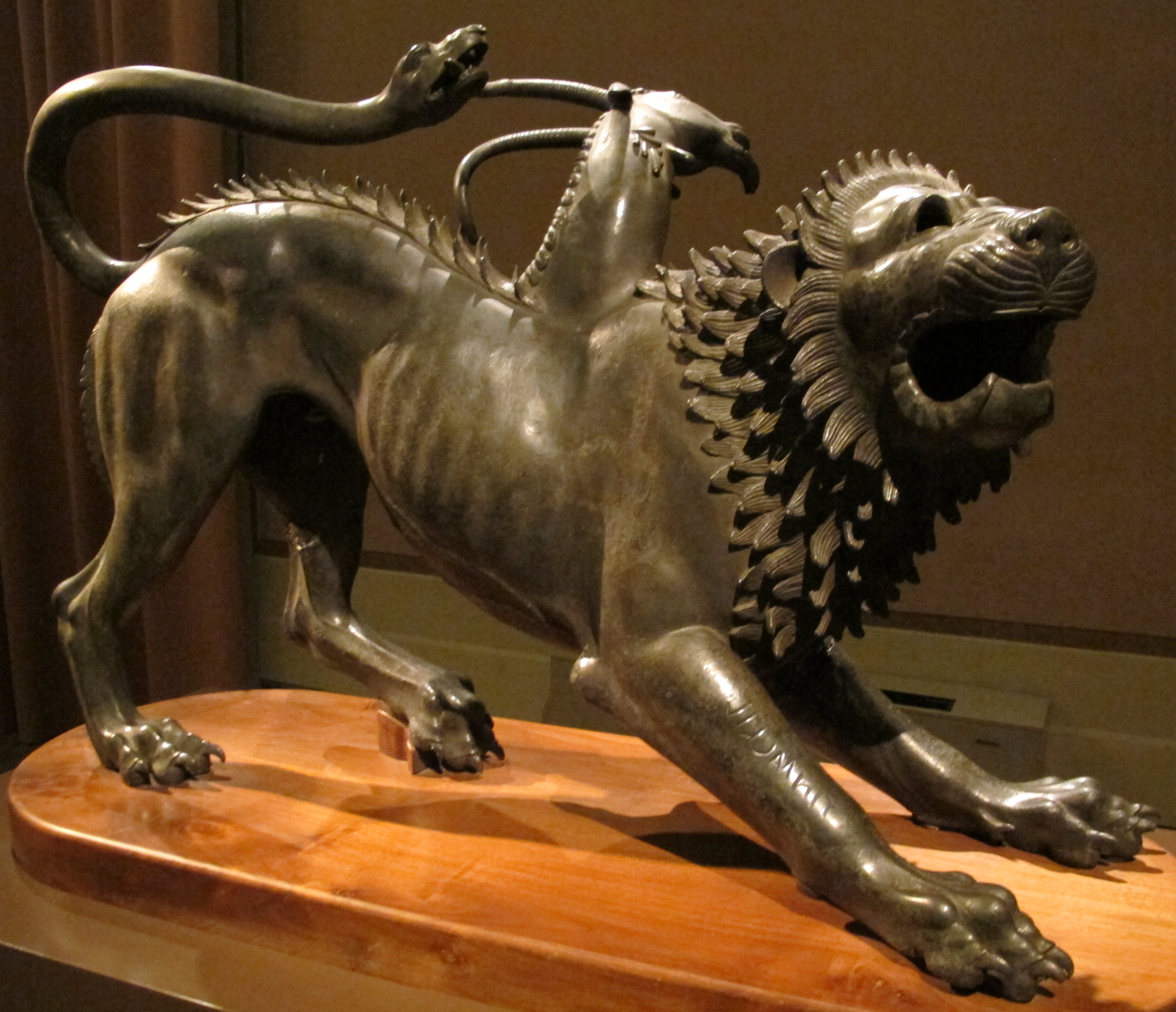
Chimera of Arezzo

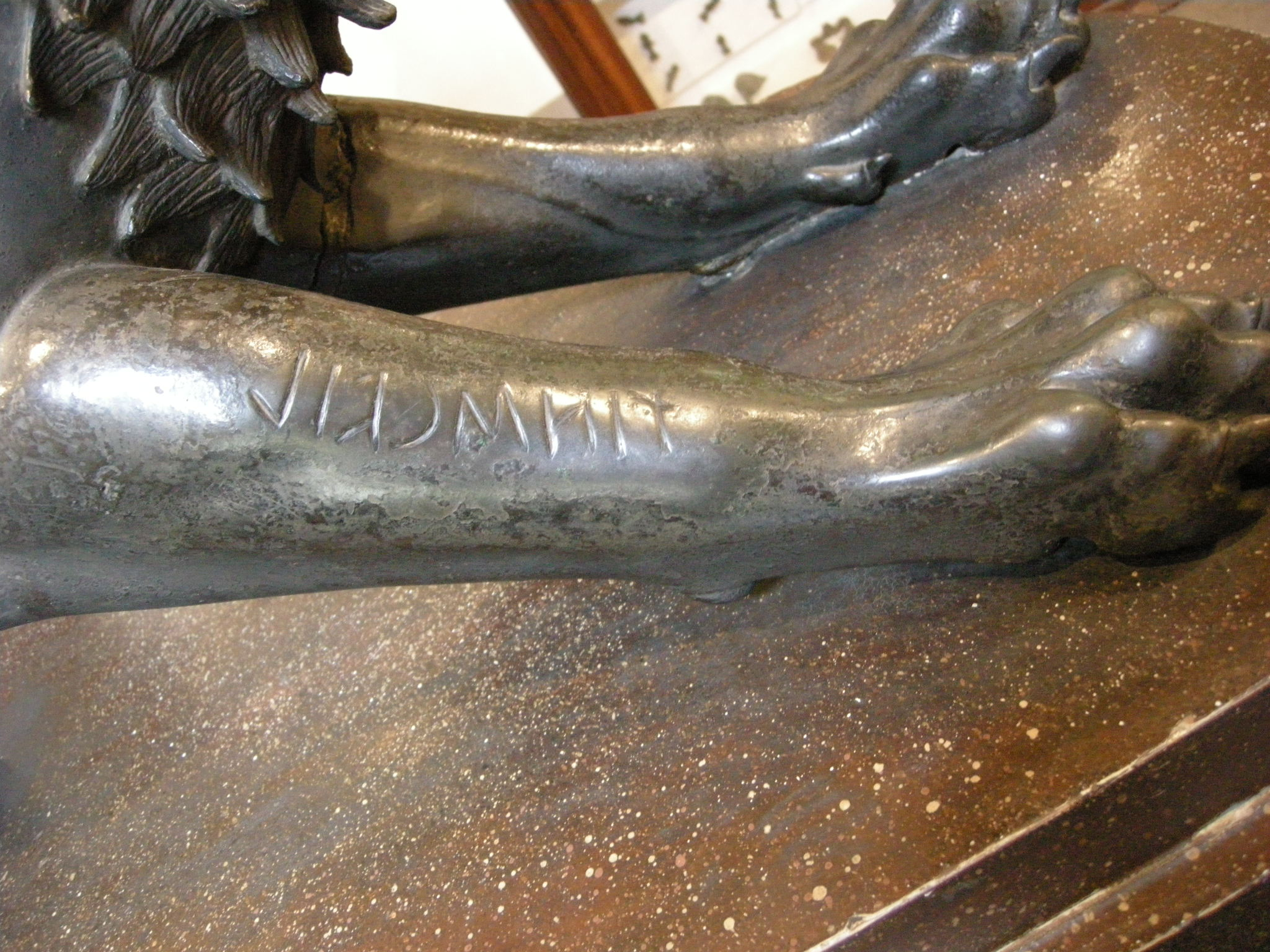
Inscription of Tinia on the Chimera's leg

The Etruscan system of belief was an immanent polytheism; that is, all visible phenomena were considered to be a manifestation of divine power and that power was subdivided into deities that acted continually on the world of man and could be dissuaded or persuaded in favor of human affairs. How to understand the will of deities, and how to behave, had been revealed to the Etruscans by two initiators, Tages, a childlike figure born from tilled land and immediately gifted with prescience, and Vegoia, a female figure. Their teachings were kept in a series of sacred books. Three layers of deities are evident in the extensive Etruscan art motifs. One appears to be divinities of an indigenous nature: Catha and Usil, the sun; Tivr, the moon; Selvans, a civil god; Turan, the goddess of love; Laran, the god of war; Leinth, the goddess of death; Maris; Thalna; Turms; and the ever-popular Fufluns, whose name is related in some way to the city of Populonia and the populus Romanus, possibly, the god of the people.

Ruling over this pantheon of lesser deities were higher ones that seem to reflect the Indo-European system: Tin or Tinia, the sky, Uni his wife (Juno), and Cel, the earth goddess. In addition, some Greek and Roman gods were inspired by the Etruscan system: Aritimi (Artemis), Menrva (Minerva), Pacha (Dionysus). The Greek heroes taken from Homer also appear extensively in art motifs.

=== Architecture ===
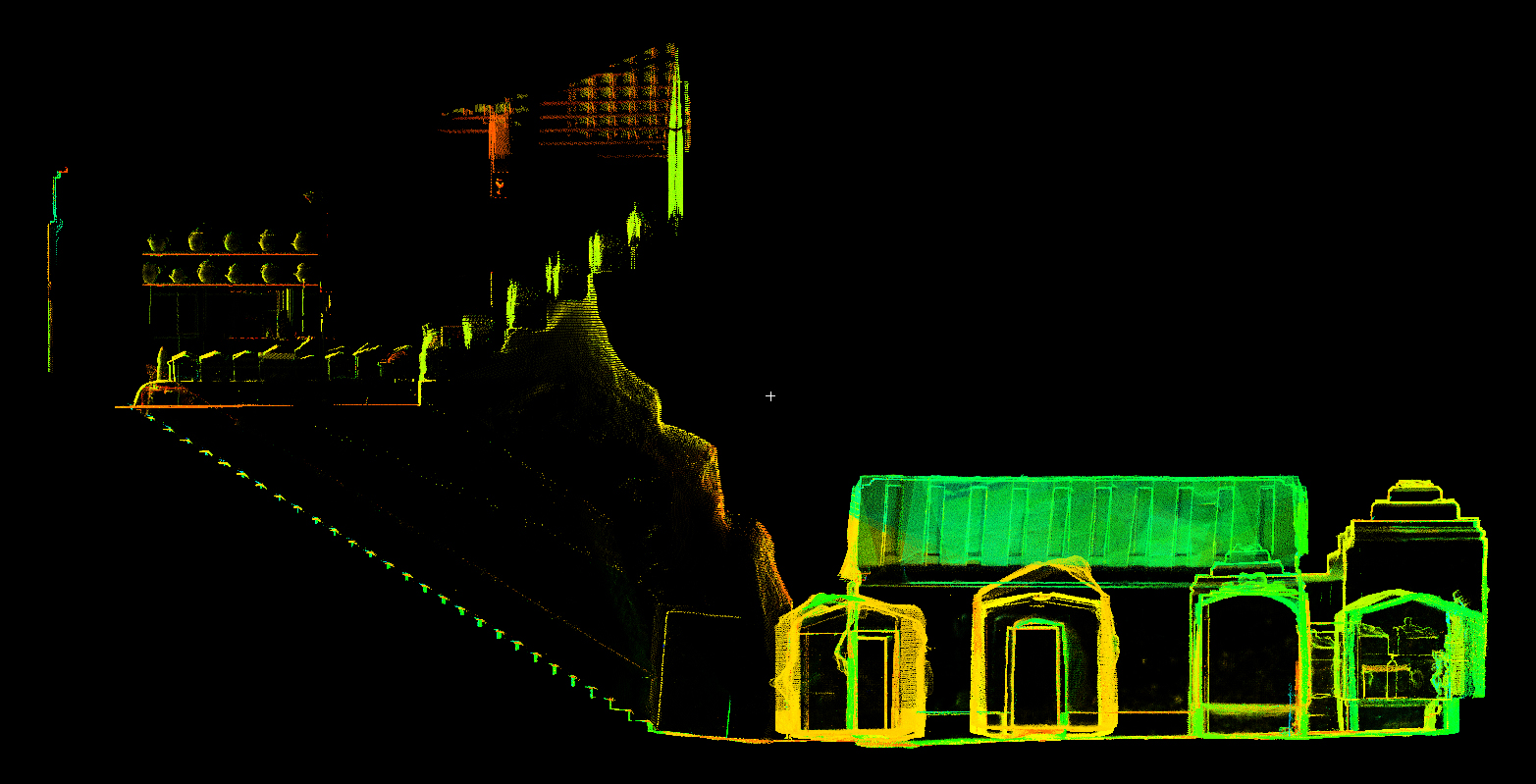
3D view, facing west, of the Etruscan Hypogeum of the Volumnis, Perugia, Italy, cut from a laser scan

Relatively little is known about the architecture of the ancient Etruscans. They adapted the native Italic styles with influence from the external appearance of Greek architecture. In turn, ancient Roman architecture began with Etruscan styles, and then accepted still further Greek influence. Roman temples show many of the same differences in form to Greek ones that Etruscan temples do, but like the Greeks, use stone, in which they closely copy Greek conventions. The houses of the wealthy were evidently often large and comfortable, but the burial chambers of tombs, often filled with grave-goods, are the nearest approach to them to survive. In the southern Etruscan area, tombs have large rock-cut chambers under a tumulus in large necropoleis, and these, together with some city walls, are the only Etruscan constructions to survive. Etruscan architecture is not generally considered as part of the body of Greco-Roman classical architecture.

=== Art and music ===
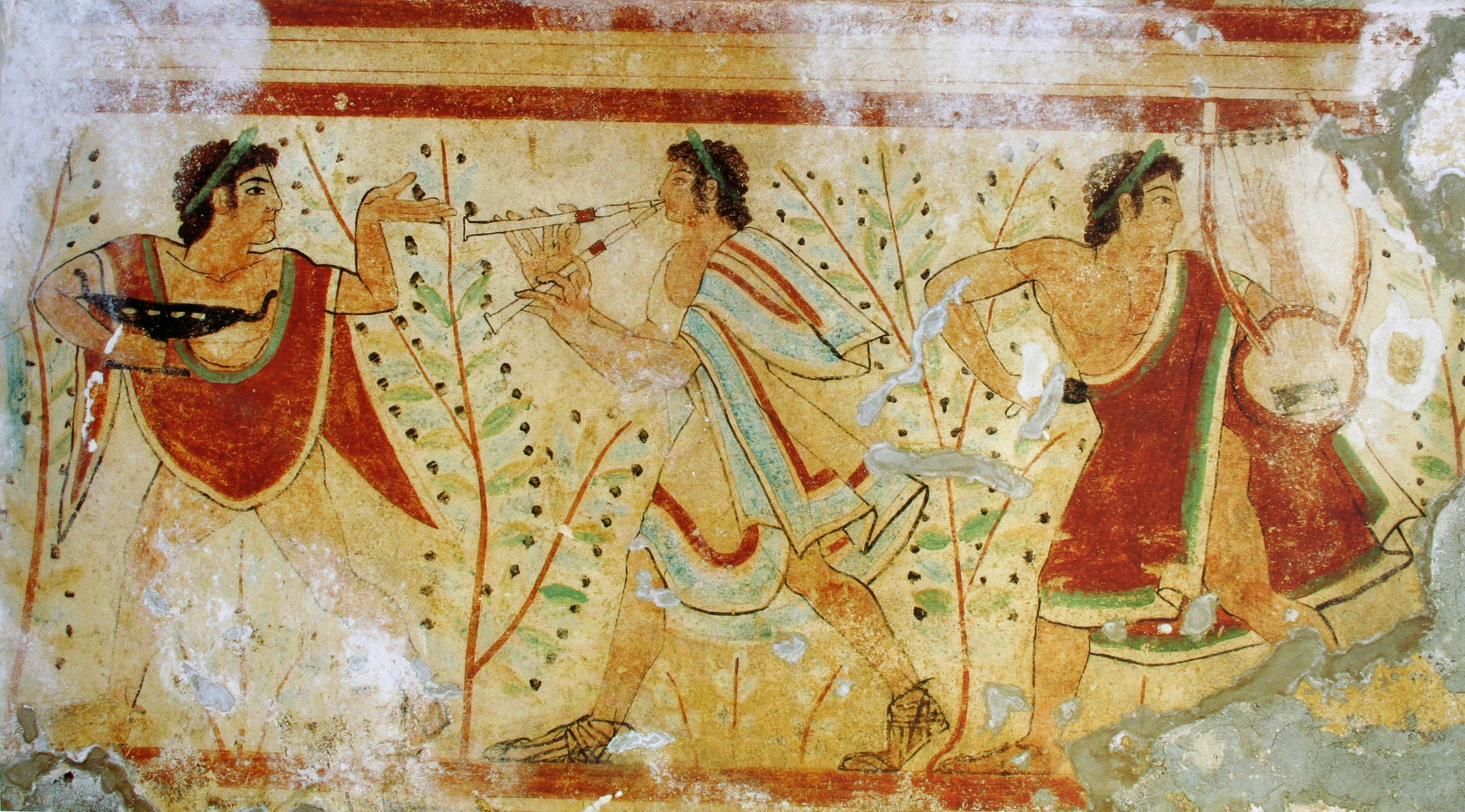
5th century BC fresco of dancers and musicians, Tomb of the Leopards, Monterozzi necropolis, Tarquinia, Italy

Etruscan art was produced by the Etruscan civilization between the 9th and 2nd centuries BC. Particularly strong in this tradition were figurative sculpture in terracotta (particularly lifesize on sarcophagi or temples), wall-painting and metalworking (especially engraved bronze mirrors). Etruscan sculpture in cast bronze was famous and widely exported, but few large examples have survived (the material was too valuable, and recycled later). In contrast to terracotta and bronze, there was apparently little Etruscan sculpture in stone, despite the Etruscans controlling fine sources of marble, including Carrara marble, which seems not to have been exploited until the Romans. Most surviving Etruscan art comes from tombs, including all the fresco wall-paintings, a minority of which show scenes of feasting and some narrative mythological subjects.

Bucchero wares in black were the early and native styles of fine Etruscan pottery. There was also a tradition of elaborate Etruscan vase painting, which sprung from its Greek equivalent; the Etruscans were the main export market for Greek vases. Etruscan temples were heavily decorated with colorfully painted terracotta antefixes and other fittings, which survive in large numbers where the wooden superstructure has vanished. Etruscan art was strongly connected to religion; the afterlife was of major importance in Etruscan art.

The Etruscan musical instruments seen in frescoes and bas-reliefs are different types of pipes, such as the plagiaulos (the pipes of Pan or Syrinx), the alabaster pipe and the famous double pipes, accompanied on percussion instruments such as the tintinnabulum, tympanum and crotales, and later by stringed instruments like the lyre and kithara.

=== Language ===
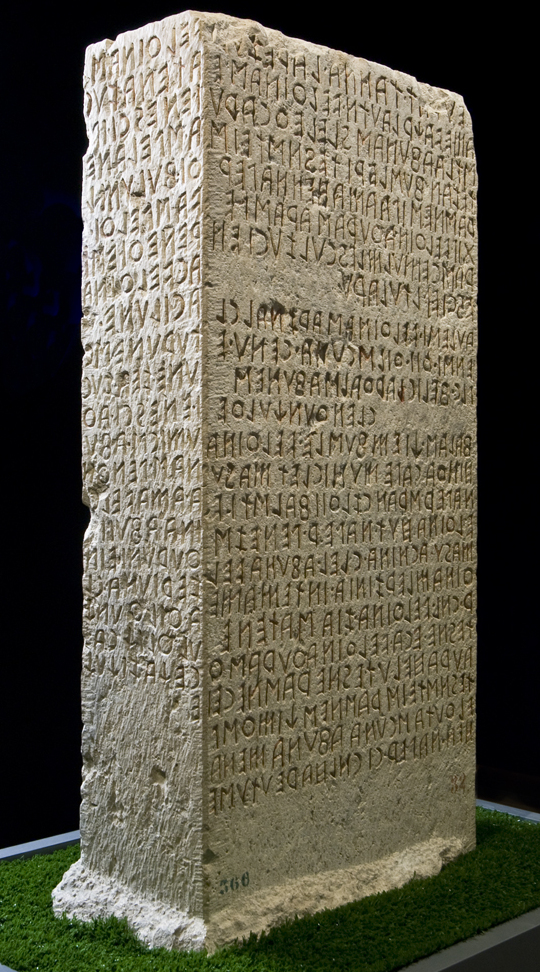
Cippus Perusinus. 3rd–2nd century BC, San Marco near Perugia

Etruscans left around 13,000 inscriptions which have been found so far, only a small minority of which are of significant length. Attested from 700 BC to AD 50, the relation of Etruscan to other languages has been a source of long-running speculation and study. The Etruscans are believed to have spoken a Pre-Indo-European and Paleo-European language, and the majority consensus is that Etruscan is related only to other members of what is called the Tyrsenian language family, which in itself is an isolate family, that is unrelated directly to other known language groups. Since Rix (1998), it is widely accepted that the Tyrsenian family groups Raetic and Lemnian are related to Etruscan.

=== Literature ===
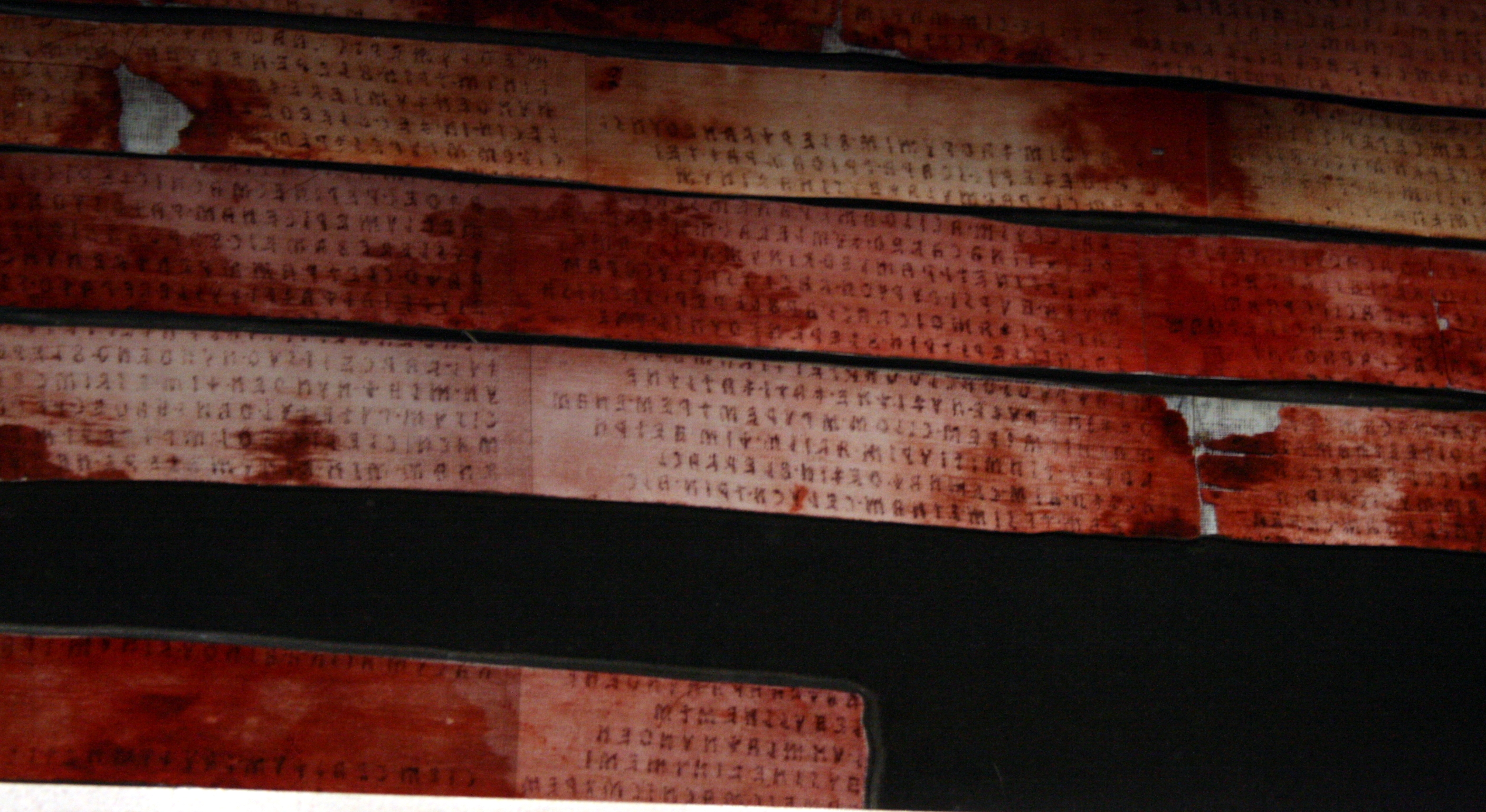
Samples of Etruscan script, from the Liber linteus

Etruscan texts, written in a space of seven centuries, use a form of the Greek alphabet due to close contact between the Etruscans and the Greek colonies at Pithecusae and Cumae in the 8th century BC (until it was no longer used, at the beginning of the 1st century AD). Etruscan inscriptions disappeared from Chiusi, Perugia and Arezzo around this time. Only a few fragments survive, religious and especially funeral texts, most of which are late (from the 4th century BC). In addition to the original texts that have survived to this day, there are a large number of quotations and allusions from classical authors. In the 1st century BC, Diodorus Siculus wrote that literary culture was one of the great achievements of the Etruscans. Little is known of it and even what is known of their language is due to the repetition of the same few words in the many inscriptions found (by way of the modern epitaphs) contrasted in bilingual or trilingual texts with Latin and Punic. Of the aforementioned genres, it is just one such that Volnio (Volnius) cited in the classical sources mentioned. With a few exceptions, such as the Liber Linteus, the only written records in the Etruscan language that remain are inscriptions, mainly funerary. The language is written in the Etruscan alphabet, a script related to the early Euboean Greek alphabet. Many thousand inscriptions in Etruscan are known, mostly epitaphs, and a few very short texts have survived, which are mainly religious. Etruscan imaginative literature is evidenced only in references by later Roman authors, but it is apparent from their visual art that the Greek myths were well known.

With the founding of Pithekussai on Ischia and Kyme (lat. Cumae) in Campania in the course of the Greek colonization, the Etruscans came under the influence of the Greek culture in the 8th century BC. The Etruscans adopted an alphabet from the western Greek colonists that came from their homeland, the Euboean Chalkis. This alphabet from Cumae is therefore also called Euboean or Chalcidian Alphabet. The oldest written records of the Etruscans date from around 700 BC.

Euboean alphabet
Letter																										
Transcription	A	B	G	D	E	V	Z	H	TH	I	K	L	M	N	X	O	P	Ś	Q	R	S	T	U	X	PH	CH

One of the oldest Etruscan written documents is found on the tablet of Marsiliana d'Albegna from the hinterland of Vulci, which is now kept in the National Archaeological Museum of Florence. A western Greek model alphabet is engraved on the edge of this wax tablet made of ivory. In accordance with later Etruscan writing habits, the letters in this model alphabet were mirrored and arranged from right to left:

Early Etruscan alphabet
Letter																										
Transcription	A	B	C	D	E	F	Z	H	TH	I	K	L	M	N	S	O	P	SH	Q	R	S	T	U	X	PH	KH

The script with these letters was first used in southern Etruria around 700 BC in the Etruscan Cisra (lat. Caere), today's Cerveteri. The science of writing quickly reached central and northern Etruria. From there, the alphabet spread from Volterra (Etr. Velathri) to Felsina, today's Bologna, and later from Chiusi (Etr. Clevsin) to the Po Valley. In southern Etruria, the writing spread from Tarquinia (Etr. Tarchna) and Veii (Etr. Veia) further south to Campania, which was controlled by the Etruscans at the time. In the following centuries the Etruscans consistently used the letters mentioned, so that the deciphering of the Etruscan inscriptions is not a problem. As in Greek, the characters were subject to regional and temporal changes. Overall, one can distinguish an archaic script from the 7th to 5th centuries from a more recent script from the 4th to 1st centuries BC, in which some characters were no longer used, including the X for a sh sound. In addition, in writing and language, the emphasis on the first syllable meant that internal vowels were not reproduced, e.g. Menrva instead of Menerva. Accordingly, linguists also distinguish between Old and New Etruscan.

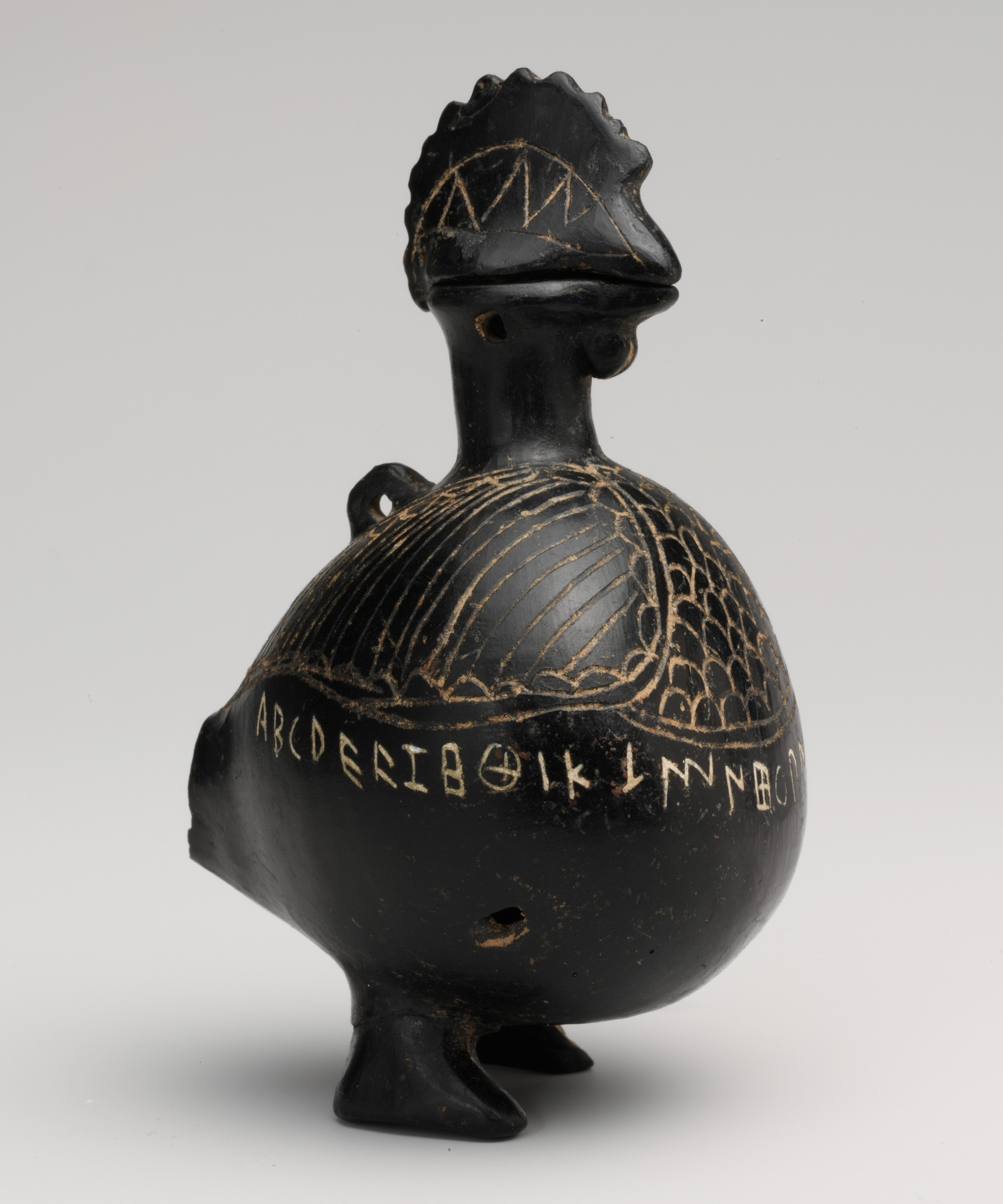
Bucchero cockerel from Viterbo. Small Etruscan bottle from 630 to 620 BCE with an early form of the alphabet

Alongside the tablet of Marsiliana d'Albegna, around 70 objects with model alphabets have been preserved from the early period. The most famous of these are:

- Alabastron from the Regolini-Galassi tomb in Cerveteri
- Bucchero amphora from Formello
- Bucchero cockerel from Viterbo
- Bucchero vessel from the necropolis of Sorbo near Cerveteri

As all four artifacts date from the 7th century B.C. come from, the alphabets are always written clockwise. The last object has the special feature that, in addition to the letters of the alphabet, almost all consonants are shown in sequence in connection with the vowels I, A, U and E (Syllabary). This syllabic writing system was probably used to practice the written characters.

The most important Etruscan written monuments that contain a large number of words include:

- Liber Linteus (Liber Linteus Zagrabiensis) – ritual text with around 1400 words
- Clay Tablet of Capua (Tabula or Tegula Capuana) – ritual text as a bustrophedon with 62 lines and around 300 words
- Tablet of Cortona (Tabula Cortonensis) – contract text with a length of 32 lines and about 200 words
- Cippus Perusinus – travertine block with 46 lines and about 125 words from near Perugia
- Pyrgi Tablets – parallel texts in Etruscan and Punic script
- Sarcophagus of Laris Pulenas – grave inscription of Laris Pulena with nine lines of text on a sarcophagus scroll
- Liver of Piacenza – model of a sheep's liver with 40 inscriptions
- Lead Plaque of Magliano – sacrificial instructions with 70 words
- Lead strip from Santa Marinella – two fragments of a sacrificial vow
- Building inscription of the tomb of San Manno near Perugia – 30-word consecration inscription
- Poupé aryballos – Clockwise dedication inscription on a bucchero bottle
- Tuscanian dice – Two dice with the numbers 1 to 6

No further Etruscan literature has survived and from the early 1st century AD, inscriptions with Etruscan characters have ceased to exist. All existing ancient Etruscan written documents are systematically collected in the Corpus Inscriptionum Etruscarum.

In the middle of the 7th century BC, the Romans adopted the Etruscan writing system and letters. In particular, they used the three different characters C, K and Q for a K sound. Z was also initially adopted into the Roman alphabet, although the affricate TS did not occur in the Latin language. Later, Z was replaced in the alphabet by the newly formed letter G, which was derived from C, and Z was finally placed at the end of the alphabet. The letters Θ, Φ and Ψ were omitted by the Romans because the corresponding aspirated sounds did not occur in their language.

The Etruscan alphabet spread across the northern and central parts of the Italian peninsula. It is assumed that the formation of the Oscan script, probably in the 6th century BC, was fundamentally influenced by Etruscan. The characters of the Umbrian, Faliscan and Venetic languages can also be traced back to Etruscan alphabets.

== See also ==
- Daily life of the Etruscans
- Fanum Voltumnae – Central sanctuary of the Etruscan league
- Etruria – Region of Central Italy
- Etruscan art – Art of the ancient Etruscan civilization
- Etruscan language – Extinct language of ancient Italy
- Etruscan origins – Theories on the ancient Italian civilization
- Etruscan religion
- Etruscan sea-faring
- List of ancient peoples of Italy
- National Etruscan Museum in Rome
- Tyrrhenians – Name used by the ancient Greeks to refer to non-Greek people
- Villanovan culture – Iron age culture in Italy
