= Combinatorial method (linguistics) =

Method used for the study of unknown languages

The combinatorial method is a method of linguistic analysis that is used to study texts which are written in an unknown language, and to study the language itself, where the unknown language has no obvious or proven well-understood close relatives, and where there are few bilingual texts which might otherwise have been used to help understand the language. It consists of three distinct analyses:

- archaeological and antiquarian analysis,
- formal-structural analysis, and
- content and context analysis.

The method relies principally on information that is available in and about the language being studied, and has most famously been used for study of the Etruscan language. It has also been used for other languages, for example by Yves Duhoux (1982) for Eteocretan. The method was first advocated by Wilhelm Deeke in his 1875 refutation of Wilhelm Corssen's attempt to demonstrate a supposed relationship between Etruscan and the Indo-European languages by the etymological method, which is based on perceived resemblances between words in the text in the unknown language and words existing in known languages.

The combinatorial method was developed to replace the etymological method because the latter bases itself on circular reasoning, in which the assumed relationship purportedly proves the interpretation of the text and vice versa, thus being inadequate for scientific study or proof. While mainstream specialists in Etruscology have long since abandoned the etymological method in favour of the slow, rigorous work of the combinatorial method, the etymological method is still popular with amateurs wishing to prove a relationship between ancient texts and an existing language.

== Archaeological-antiquarian analysis ==
Archaeological-antiquarian analysis consists of using archaeological and antiquarian methods to determine the nature of the text, such as the nature of the object bearing the inscription, and the circumstances and location of its discovery. An example of ignoring this stage would be to describe the Pyrgi Tablets as part of a temple archive, as some commentators did when the tablets were found in 1964, when quite clearly the tablets had been nailed to a wall as a notice. Part of this stage is also rigorously checking the epigraphic or palaeographic details of the inscription concerned. Vladimir Georgiev's claim that Etruscan is related to Hittite was largely based on a non-existent word esmi which had been incorrectly read from an inscription, while Mario Alinei's 2003 claim that the word iθal means "drink" and that Etruscan is thus based on Hungarian is ruled out by the fact that iθal occurs in one single inscription and does not re-occur in the many hundreds of known inscribed Etruscan symposium vessels which might be expected to contain the word "drink" if their Latin equivalents are anything to go by.

== Formal-structural analysis ==
Formal-structural analysis consists of breaking down words into their component morphemes to form a hypothesis of the structure of the language, which must be consistent with that deduced from other interpreted or partly interpreted inscriptions, and with the features that might be expected in known languages. The point of this stage is to reveal the root words and their roles in the text. While establishing the meaning of the word or morpheme is not the key goal at this stage, it can however rule out potential meanings. For example, Zacharie Mayani's claim that Etruscan θu means "two" is ruled out by the fact that θu is the only Etruscan numeral which is never found with a plural referent, and in addition it does not have a derived multiple of 10 based on it, which points to it meaning not "two" but "one".

== Content and context analysis ==
Once both the root form of a word and an idea of its role in the text and elsewhere are established, an analysis of content and context can be carried out to determine the word's part of speech, or whether it is part of a name, and if so, the sex of the person, and if an object or an action, its likely nature or general semantic area. This stage must also ensure that any proposed more definite meaning is consistent with all other instances, but must also allow for the possibility of homonyms with different meanings and morphemes with more than one purpose.

Meanings and interpretations established by the combinatorial method are not certain, for example, as meanings confirmed by a bilingual text or by a reliable ancient gloss, but are of variable reliability, and as provisional models. The understanding of the Etruscan language has gradually increased over the years, as new knowledge from the Etruscan texts themselves, and from research in other disciplines of Etruscology. Giulio Facchetti's research into Etruscan private law (2000) taken together with the publication of the text of the Cortona tablet in 1999 is an example of where this has happened.
