= Combinatorial method =

Combinatorial method may refer to:

- Combinatorial method (linguistics), a method used for the study of unknown languages
- Combinatorial principles, combinatorial methods used in combinatorics, a branch of mathematics
- Combinatorial optimization, combinatorial methods in applied mathematics and theoretical computer science used in finding an optimal object from a finite set of objects
