= Etruscan language =

Extinct language of ancient Italy

Etruscan
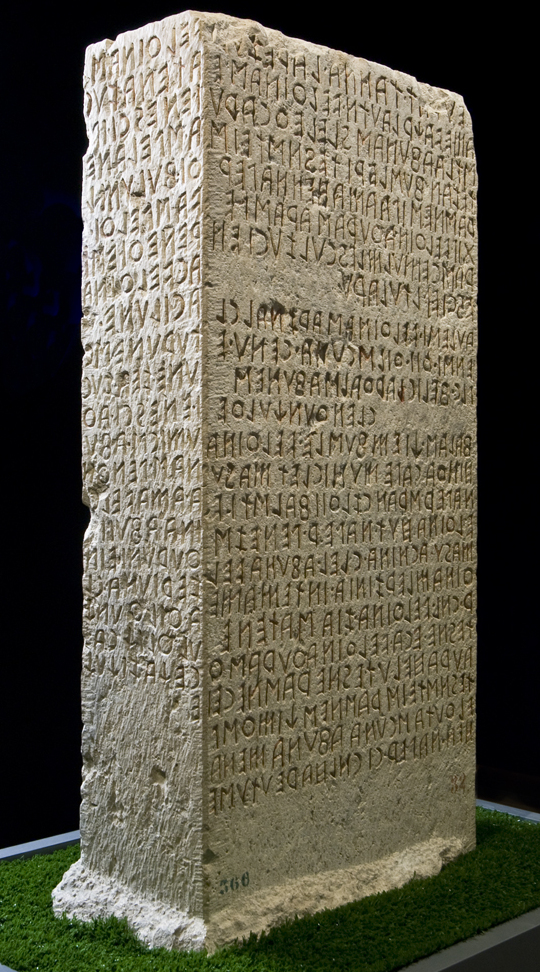
- The Cippus Perusinus, a stone tablet bearing 46 lines of incised Etruscan text, one of the longest extant Etruscan inscriptions. 3rd or 2nd century BC.
- Native to: Ancient Etruria
- Date: 700 BC
- Region: Italian Peninsula
- Ethnicity: Etruscans
- Era: attested 700 BC to AD 50
- Language family: Tyrrhenian
- Writing system: Etruscan alphabet

Language codes
- ISO 639-3: ett
- Glottolog: etru1241

Etruscan (/ɪˈtrʌskən/ ih-TRUSK-ən) was the language of the Etruscan civilization in the ancient region of Etruria, (Note: Etruria: modern Tuscany, western Umbria, northern Latium.) in Etruria Padana (Note: Etruria Padana: modern Veneto, Lombardy, Emilia-Romagna.) and Etruria Campana (Note: Etruria Campana: some areas of coastal Campania) in what is now Italy. Etruscan influenced Latin but was eventually displaced by it. Around 13,000 Etruscan inscriptions have been found so far, very few of significant length; some inscriptions bilingual in Latin, Greek, or Phoenician; and a few dozen probable loanwords in Latin. It is attested from 700 BC to 50 AD and the relation of Etruscan to other languages has been a source of long-running speculation and study. Nowadays it is generally agreed to be in the Tyrrhenian language family but it used to commonly be treated as a language isolate, although there were also a number of other lesser-known hypotheses.

The consensus among linguists and Etruscologists is that Etruscan was a Pre-Indo-European and Paleo-European language, closely related to the Raetic language that was spoken in the Alps, and to the Lemnian language, attested in a few inscriptions on Lemnos.

The Etruscan alphabet derived from the Greek alphabet, specifically from the Euboean script, which Greek colonists brought to southern Italy. Therefore linguists have been able to read the inscriptions in the sense of knowing roughly how they would have been pronounced but have not yet understood their meaning. However by using combinatory method it was possible to assign some Etruscan words to grammatical categories such as noun and verb, to identify some inflectional endings and to assign meanings to a few words of very frequent occurrence.

A comparison between the Etruscan and Greek alphabets reveals how closely the Etruscans preserved the Greek alphabet. The Etruscan alphabet contains letters that have since been dropped from the Greek alphabet, such as the digamma, sampi and qoppa.

Grammatically the language is agglutinating, with nouns and verbs showing suffixed inflectional endings and some gradation of vowels. Nouns show five cases, singular and plural numbers, with a gender distinction between animate and inanimate in pronouns.

Etruscan appears to have had a cross-linguistically common phonological system, with four phonemic vowels and an apparent contrast between aspirated and unaspirated stops. The records of the language suggest that phonetic change took place over time, with the loss and then re-establishment of word-internal vowels, possibly due to the effect of Etruscan's word-initial stress.

Etruscan religion was influenced by that of the Greeks, and many of the few surviving Etruscan-language artifacts are of votive or religious significance. The Etruscan language is also believed to be the source of certain important cultural words of Western Europe such as military and person, which do not have obvious Indo-European roots.

== History of Etruscan literacy ==
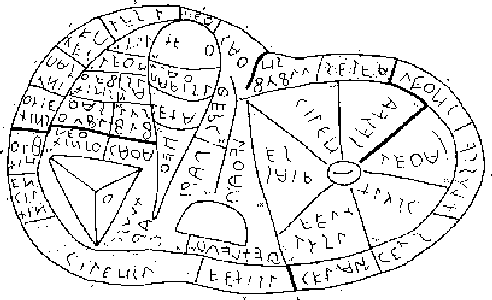
Drawing of the inscriptions on the Liver of Piacenza; see haruspex

Etruscan literacy was widespread over the Mediterranean shores, as evidenced by about 13,000 inscriptions (dedications, epitaphs, etc.), most fairly short but some of considerable length. They date from about 700 BC.

The Etruscans had a rich literature, as noted by Latin authors. Livy and Cicero were both aware that highly specialized Etruscan religious rites were codified in several sets of books written in Etruscan under the generic Latin title Etrusca Disciplina. The Libri Haruspicini dealt with divination by reading entrails from a sacrificed animal, whilst the Libri Fulgurales expounded the art of divination by observing lightning. A third set, the Libri Rituales, may have provided a key to Etruscan civilization: its wider scope embraced Etruscan standards of social and political life as well as ritual practices. According to the 4th-century AD Latin writer Maurus Servius Honoratus, a fourth set of Etruscan books existed, dealing with animal gods, but it is unlikely that any scholar living in that era could have read Etruscan. However only one book (as opposed to inscription), the Liber Linteus, survived, and only because the linen on which it was written was used as mummy wrappings.

By 30 BC Livy had noted that Etruscan was once widely taught to Roman boys but had since been replaced by the teaching of Greek, whilst Varro noted that theatrical works had once been composed in Etruscan.

=== Demise ===
The date of the extinction of Etruscan is held by scholarship to have been either in the late 1st century BC or the early 1st century AD. Freeman's analysis of inscriptional evidence implies that Etruscan was still flourishing in the 2nd century BC, still alive in the 1st century BC and surviving in at least one location in the beginning of the 1st century AD; however the replacement of Etruscan by Latin likely occurred earlier in southern regions closer to Rome.

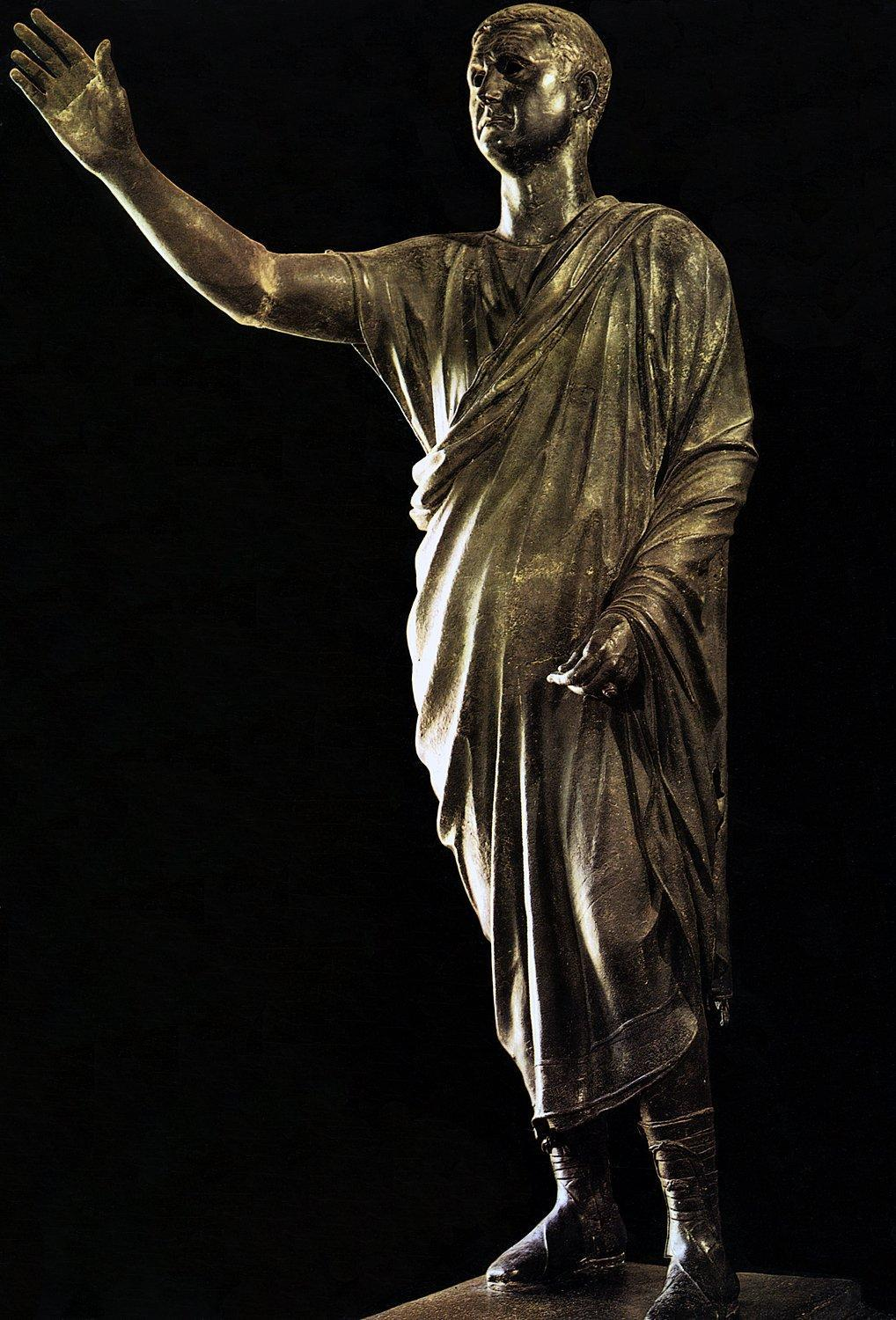

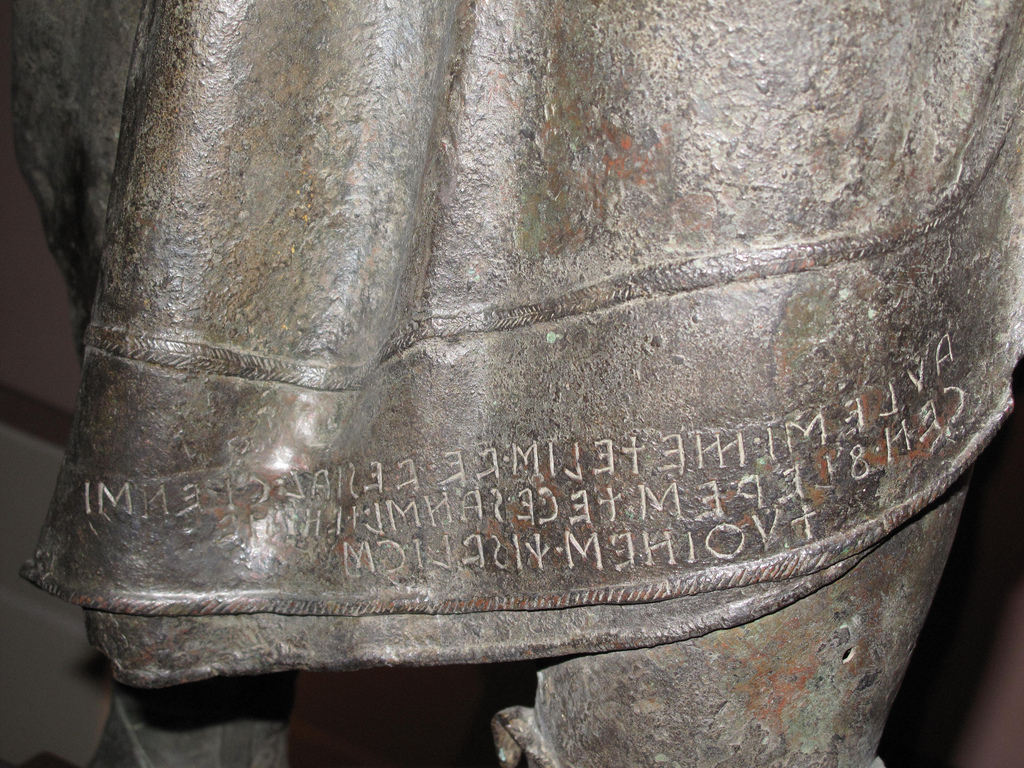
The Orator (c. 100 BC), an Etrusco-Roman bronze sculpture depicting Aule Metele (Latin: Aulus Metellus), an Etruscan man of Roman senatorial rank engaging in rhetoric, with detail of the Etruscan inscription

In southern Etruria the first Etruscan site to be Latinized was Veii, when it was destroyed and repopulated by Romans in 396 BC. Caere (Cerveteri), another southern Etruscan town on the coast 45 kilometres from Rome, appears to have shifted to Latin in the late 2nd century BC. In Tarquinia and Vulci Latin inscriptions coexisted with Etruscan inscriptions in wall paintings and grave markers for centuries, from the 3rd century BC until the early 1st century BC, after which Etruscan is replaced by the exclusive use of Latin.

In northern Etruria Etruscan inscriptions continue after they disappear in southern Etruria. At Clusium (Chiusi) tomb markings show mixed Latin and Etruscan in the first half of the 1st century BC, with cases where two subsequent generations are inscribed in Latin and then surprisingly the third, youngest generation is transcribed in Etruscan. At Perugia, monolingual monumental inscriptions in Etruscan are still seen in the first half of the 1st century BC whilst the period of bilingual inscriptions appears to have stretched from the 3rd century to the late 1st century BC. The isolated last bilinguals are found at three northern sites. Inscriptions in Arezzo include one dated to 40 BC followed by two with slightly later dates, whilst in Volterra, there is one dated to just after 40 BC and a final one dated to 10–20 AD; coins with written Etruscan near Saena (Sienna) have also been dated to 15 BC. Freeman notes that in rural areas, the language may have survived a bit longer and that survival into the late 1st century AD and beyond "cannot wholly be dismissed", especially given the revelation of Oscan writing on the walls of Pompeii.

Despite the apparent extinction of Etruscan, it appears that Etruscan religious rites continued much later, continuing to use the Etruscan names of deities and possibly with some liturgical usage of the language. In late Republican and early Augustan times various Latin sources including Cicero noted the esteemed reputation of Etruscan soothsayers. An episode where lightning struck an inscription with the name Caesar, turning it into Aesar, was interpreted to have been a premonition of the deification of Caesar because of the resemblance to Etruscan aisar, meaning 'gods', although this indicates knowledge of a single word and not the language. Centuries later and long after Etruscan is thought to have died out Ammianus Marcellinus reports that Julian the Apostate, the last pagan emperor, apparently had Etruscan soothsayers accompany him on his military campaigns with books on war, lightning and celestial events, but the language of these books is unknown. According to Zosimus, when Rome was faced with destruction by Alaric in 408 AD, the protection of nearby Etruscan towns was attributed to Etruscan pagan priests who claimed to have summoned a raging thunderstorm, and they offered their services "in the ancestral manner" to Rome as well, but the devout Christians of Rome refused the offer, preferring death to help by pagans. Freeman notes that these events may indicate that a limited theological knowledge of Etruscan may have survived among the priestly caste much longer. One 19th-century writer argued in 1892 that Etruscan deities retained an influence on early-modern Tuscan folklore.

Around 180 AD, the Latin author Aulus Gellius mentions Etruscan alongside the Gaulish language in an anecdote. Freeman notes that although Gaulish was clearly still alive during Gellius' time, his testimony may not indicate that Etruscan was still alive because the phrase could indicate a meaning of the sort of "it's all Greek (incomprehensible) to me".

At the time of its extinction, only a few educated Romans with antiquarian interests, such as Marcus Terentius Varro, could read Etruscan. The Roman emperor Claudius (10 BC – AD 54) is considered to have possibly been able to read Etruscan and wrote the Tyrrhenika, a (now lost) treatise on Etruscan history; a separate dedication made by Claudius implies a knowledge from "diverse Etruscan sources", but it is unclear if any were fluent speakers of Etruscan. Plautia Urgulanilla, the emperor's first wife, had Etruscan roots.

Etruscan had some influence on Latin, with a few dozen Etruscan words and names being borrowed by the Romans, some of which remain in modern languages, among which are possibly voltur 'vulture', tuba 'trumpet', vagina 'sheath', populus 'people'.

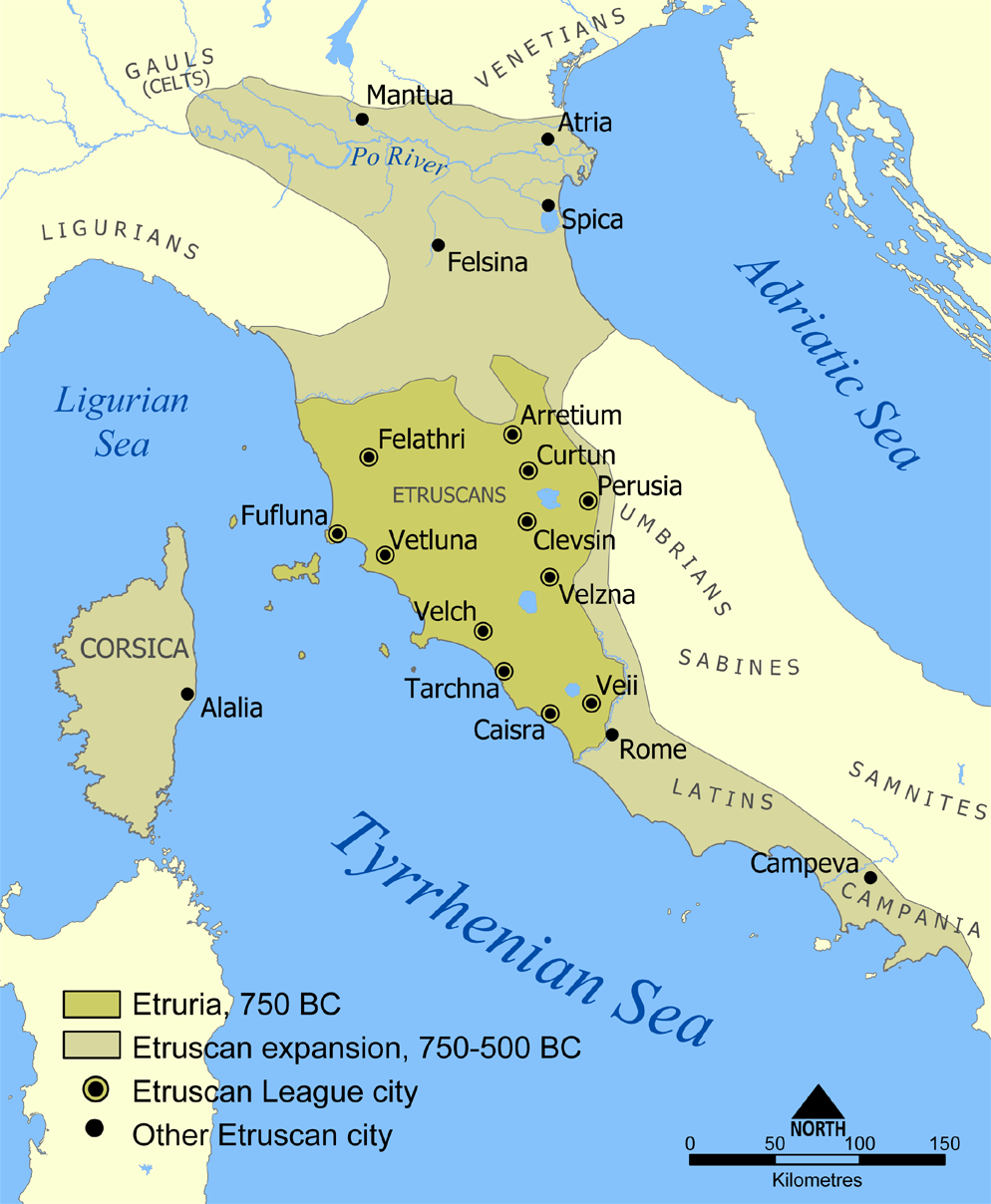
Maximum extent of Etruscan civilization and the twelve Etruscan League cities

== Geographic distribution ==
Inscriptions have been found in northwest and west-central Italy, in the region that even now bears the name of the Etruscan civilization, Tuscany (from Latin tuscī 'Etruscans'), as well as in modern Latium north of Rome, in today's Umbria west of the Tiber, in the Po Valley to the north of Etruria, and in Campania. This range may indicate a maximum Italian homeland where the language was at one time spoken.

Outside Italy, inscriptions have been found in Corsica, Gallia Narbonensis, Greece, and the Balkans. The greatest concentration of inscriptions, however, is in Italy.

== Classification ==
=== Tyrrhenian family hypothesis ===
Tyrrhenian language family tree as proposed by de Simone and Marchesini (2013)

In 1998, Helmut Rix put forward the view that Etruscan is related to other extinct languages such as Raetic, spoken in ancient times in the eastern Alps, and Lemnian, to which other scholars added the Camunic language, spoken in the Central Alps. Rix's Tyrrhenian language family has gained widespread acceptance among scholars, being confirmed by Stefan Schumacher, Norbert Oettinger, Carlo De Simone, and Simona Marchesini.

Common features between Etruscan, Raetic, and Lemnian have been found in morphology, phonology, and syntax, but only a few lexical correspondences are documented, at least partly due to the scant number of Raetic and Lemnian texts. On the other hand, the Tyrrhenian family, or Common Tyrrhenic, is often considered to be Paleo-European and to predate the arrival of Indo-European languages in southern Europe. Several scholars believe that the Lemnian language could have arrived in the Aegean Sea during the Late Bronze Age, when Mycenaean rulers recruited groups of mercenaries from Sicily, Sardinia and various parts of the Italian peninsula. Scholars such as Norbert Oettinger, Michel Gras and Carlo De Simone think that Lemnian is the testimony of an Etruscan commercial settlement on the island that took place before 700 BC, not related to the Sea Peoples.

==== Archeogenetic studies ====
A 2021 archeogenetic analysis of Etruscan individuals, who lived between 800 and 1 BC, concluded that the Etruscans were indigenous and genetically similar to the Early Iron Age Latins, and that the Etruscan language, and therefore the other languages of the Tyrrhenian family, may have been a surviving language of the ones that were widespread in Europe from at least the Neolithic period before the arrival of the Indo-European languages, as already argued by German geneticist Johannes Krause who concluded that it is likely that the Etruscan language (as well as Basque, Paleo-Sardinian and Minoan) "developed on the continent in the course of the Neolithic Revolution". The lack of recent Anatolian-related admixture and Iranian-related ancestry among the Etruscans, who genetically joined firmly to the European cluster, might also suggest that the presence of a handful of inscriptions found at Lemnos, in a language related to Etruscan and Raetic, "could represent population movements departing from the Italian peninsula".

=== Superseded theories and fringe scholarship ===
For many hundreds of years the classification of Etruscan remained problematic for historical linguists, though it was almost universally agreed upon that Etruscan was a language unlike any other in Europe. Before it gained currency as one of the Tyrrhenian languages, Etruscan was commonly treated as a language isolate. Over the centuries many hypotheses on the Etruscan language have been developed, most of which have not been accepted or have been considered highly speculative since they were published. The major consensus among scholars is that Etruscan, and therefore all the languages of the Tysenian family, is neither Indo-European nor Semitic, and may be a Pre–Indo-European and Paleo-European language. At present the major consensus is that Etruscan's only kinship is with the Raetic and Lemnian languages.

==== Pre-Greek substrate hypothesis ====
The idea of a relation between the language of the Minoan Linear A scripts was taken into consideration as the main hypothesis by Michael Ventris before he discovered that, in fact, the language behind the later Linear B script was Mycenean, a Greek dialect. It has been proposed to possibly be part of a wider Paleo-European "Aegean" language family, which would also include Minoan, Eteocretan (possibly descended from Minoan) and Eteocypriot. This has been proposed by Giulio Mauro Facchetti, a researcher who has dealt with both Etruscan and Minoan, and supported by S. Yatsemirsky, referring to some similarities between Etruscan and Lemnian on one hand, and Minoan and Eteocretan on the other. It has also been proposed that this language family is related to the pre-Indo-European languages of Anatolia, based upon place name analysis. The relationship between Etruscan and Minoan, and hypothetical unattested pre-Indo-European languages of Anatolia, is considered unfounded.

==== Anatolian Indo-European family hypothesis ====
Some have suggested that Tyrrhenian languages may yet be distantly related to early Indo-European languages, such as those of the Anatolian branch. More recently, Robert S. P. Beekes argued in 2002 that the people later known as the Lydians and Etruscans had originally lived in northwest Anatolia, with a coastline to the Sea of Marmara, whence they were driven by the Phrygians circa 1200 BC, leaving a remnant known in antiquity as the Tyrsenoi. A segment of this people moved south-west to Lydia, becoming known as the Lydians, while others sailed away to take refuge in Italy, where they became known as Etruscans. This account draws on the well-known story by Herodotus (I, 94) of the Lydian origin of the Etruscans or Tyrrhenians, famously rejected by Dionysius of Halicarnassus (book I), partly on the authority of Xanthus, a Lydian historian, who had no knowledge of the story, and partly on what he judged to be the different languages, laws, and religions of the two peoples. In 2006, Frederik Woudhuizen went further on Herodotus' traces, suggesting that Etruscan belongs to the Anatolian branch of the Indo-European family, specifically to Luwian. Woudhuizen revived a conjecture to the effect that the Tyrrhenians came from Anatolia, including Lydia, whence they were driven by the Cimmerians in the early Iron Age, 750–675 BC, leaving some colonists on Lemnos. He makes a number of comparisons of Etruscan to Luwian and asserts that Etruscan is modified Luwian. He accounts for the non-Luwian features as a Mysian influence: "deviations from Luwian [...] may plausibly be ascribed to the dialect of the indigenous population of Mysia." According to Woudhuizen, the Etruscans were initially colonizing the Latins, bringing the alphabet from Anatolia. For historical, archaeological, genetic, and linguistic reasons, a relationship between Etruscan and the Indo-European Anatolian languages (Lydian or Luwian) and the idea that the Etruscans initially colonized the Latins, bringing the alphabet from Anatolia, have not been accepted, since the account by Herodotus is no longer considered reliable.

==== Other theories ====
The interest in Etruscan antiquities and the Etruscan language found its modern origin in a book by a Renaissance Dominican friar, Annio da Viterbo, a cabalist and orientalist now remembered mainly for literary forgeries. In 1498, Annio published his antiquarian miscellany titled Antiquitatum variarum (in 17 volumes) where he put together a theory in which both the Hebrew and Etruscan languages were said to originate from a single source, the "Aramaic" spoken by Noah and his descendants, founders of the Etruscan city Viterbo.

The 19th century saw numerous attempts to reclassify Etruscan. Ideas of Semitic origins found supporters until this time. In 1858, the last attempt was made by Johann Gustav Stickel, Jena University in his Das Etruskische durch Erklärung von Inschriften und Namen als semitische Sprache erwiesen. A reviewer concluded that Stickel brought forward every possible argument which would speak for that hypothesis, but he proved the opposite of what he had attempted to do. In 1861, Robert Ellis proposed that Etruscan was related to Armenian. In 1890, Sophus Bugge published a comparative analysis of Etruscan and the Armenian language. Exactly 100 years after Ellis, a relationship with Albanian was to be advanced by Zecharia Mayani, a theory regarded today as disproven and discredited.

Several theories from the late 19th and early 20th centuries connected Etruscan to Uralic or even Altaic languages. In 1874, the British scholar Isaac Taylor brought up the idea of a genetic relationship between Etruscan and Hungarian, of which also Jules Martha would approve in his exhaustive study La langue étrusque (1913). In 1911, the French orientalist Baron Carra de Vaux suggested a connection between Etruscan and the Altaic languages. The Hungarian connection was revived by Mario Alinei, emeritus professor of Italian languages at the University of Utrecht. Alinei's proposal has been rejected by Etruscan experts such as Giulio M. Facchetti, Finno-Ugric linguist Angela Marcantonio, and by Hungarian historical linguists such as Bela Brogyanyi. Another proposal, pursued mainly by a few linguists from the former Soviet Union, suggested a relationship with Northeast Caucasian (or Nakh-Daghestanian) languages. None of these theories has been accepted nor enjoys consensus.

== Epigraphy ==
The corpus of Etruscan inscriptions is edited in the Corpus Inscriptionum Etruscarum (CIE) and Thesaurus Linguae Etruscae (TLE).

=== Bilingual text ===
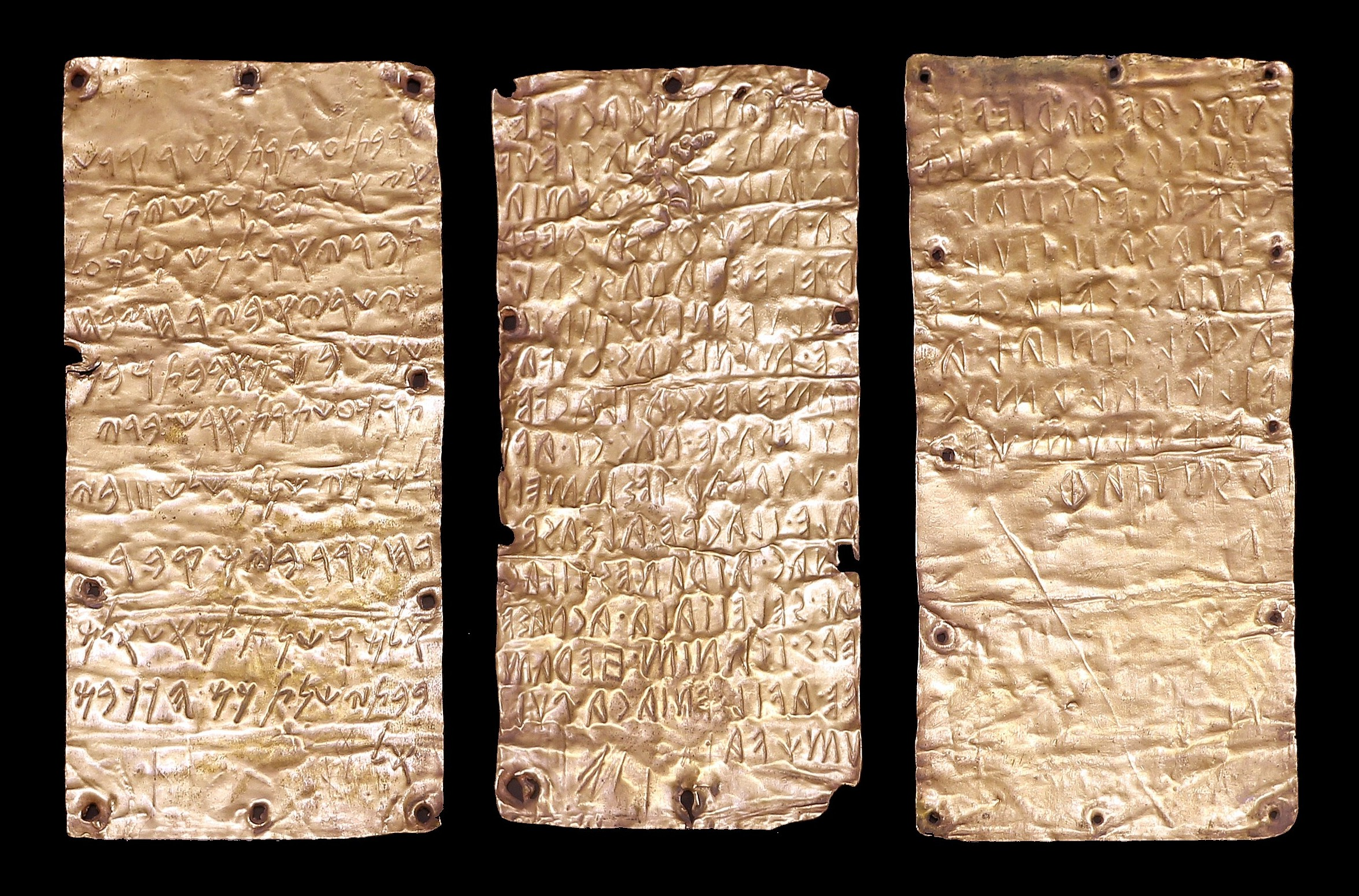
The Pyrgi Tablets, sheets of gold with a bilingual treatise in Etruscan (center and right) and Phoenician, at the Etruscan Museum in Rome

The Pyrgi Tablets are a bilingual text in Etruscan and Phoenician engraved on three gold leaves, one for the Phoenician and two for the Etruscan. The Etruscan language portion has 16 lines and 37 words. The date is roughly 500 BC.

The tablets were found in 1964 by Massimo Pallottino during an excavation at the ancient Etruscan port of Pyrgi, now Santa Severa. The only new Etruscan word that could be extracted from close analysis of the tablets was the word for 'three', ci.

=== Longer texts ===
According to Rix and his collaborators, only two unified (though fragmentary) long texts are available in Etruscan:

- The Liber Linteus Zagrabiensis, which was later used for mummy wrappings in Egypt. Roughly 1,200 words of readable (but not fully translatable) text, mainly repetitious prayers probably comprising a kind of religious calendar, yielded about 50 lexical items.
- The Tabula Capuana (the inscribed tile from Capua) has about 300 readable words in 62 lines, dating to the fifth century BC. It again seems to be a religious calendar.

Some additional longer texts are:

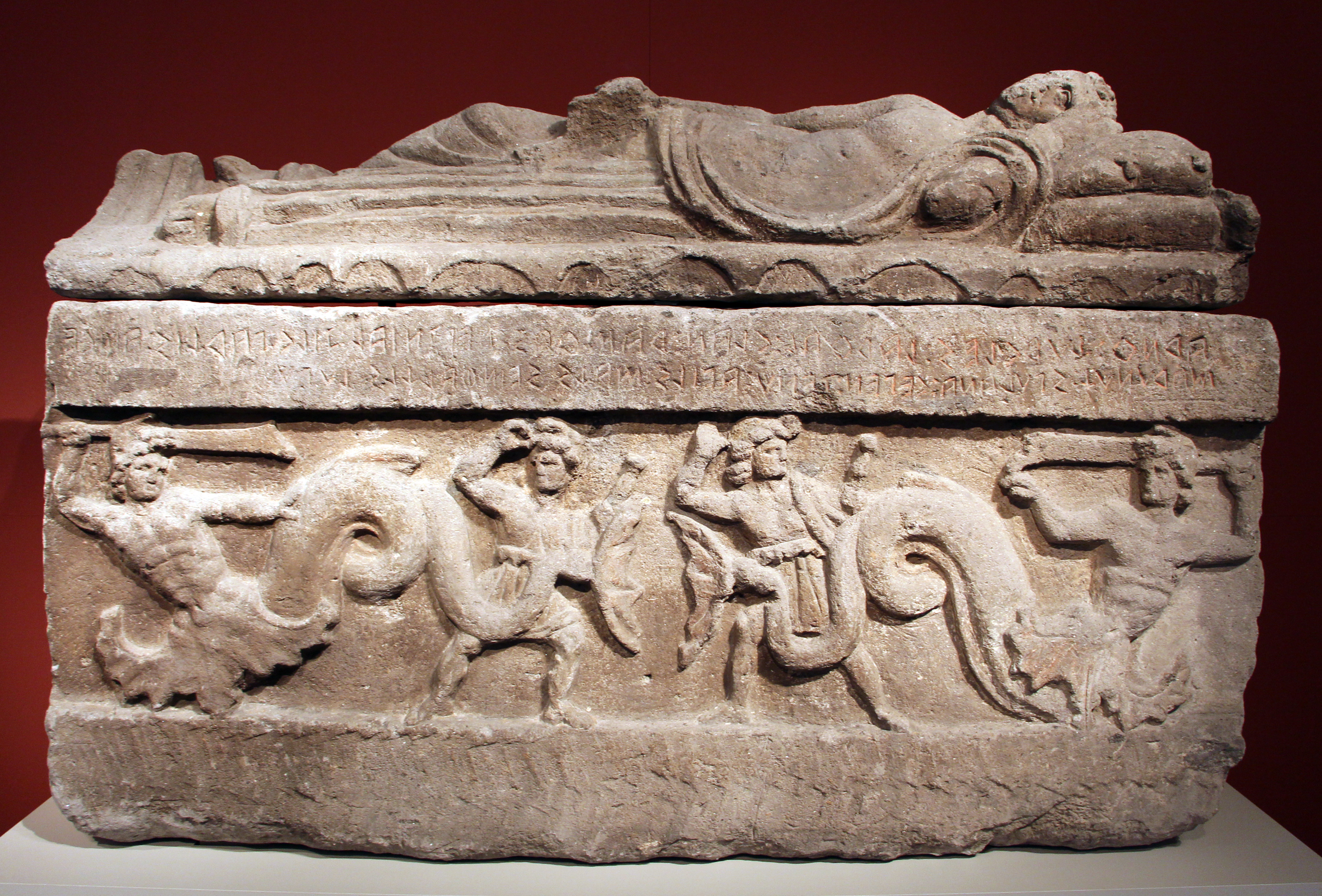
Sarcophagus of Arnth Churcles, a magistrate holding the title marunuch in Norchia (c. 300–270 BC), with the horizontal inscription between the lid and side relief

- The inscription of 59 words on the Sarcophagus of Laris Pulenas, also known as The Magistrate, dating from the third century BC, discovered in Tarquinia, now residing in Museo Nazionale Archeologico (Tarquinia, Viterbo, Lazio, Italy).
- The lead foils of Punta della Vipera have about 40 legible words having to do with ritual formulae. It is dated to about 500 BC.
- The Cippus Perusinus, a stone slab (cippus) found at Perugia, which probably functioned as a border marker, contains 46 lines and about 130 words. The cippus is assumed to be a text dedicating a legal contract between the Etruscan families of Velthina (from Perugia) and Afuna (from Chiusi), regarding the sharing or use of a property, including water rights, upon which there was a tomb belonging to the noble Velthinas.
- The Piacenza Liver, a bronze model of a sheep's liver representing the sky, has the engraved names of the gods ruling different sections.
- The Tabula Cortonensis, a bronze tablet from Cortona, is believed to record a legal contract between Cusu family and Petru Scevas and his wife concerning a real estate settlement of some sort, with about 200 words. Discovered in 1992, this new tablet contributed the word for 'lake', tisś, but not much else.
- The Vicchio stele, found in the 21st season of excavation at the Etruscan Sanctuary at Poggio Colla, is believed to be connected with the cult of the goddess Uni, with about 120 letters. Only discovered in 2016, it is still in the process of being deciphered. As an example of difficulties in reading this badly damaged monument, here is Maggiani's attempt at a transliteration and translation of a bit from the beginning of the third block of text (III, 1–3): (vacat) tinaś: θ(?)anuri: unial(?)/ ẹ ṿ ị: zal / ame (akil??) "for Tinia in the xxxx of Uni/xxxx(objects) two / must (akil ?) be..."
- The badly damaged Saint Marinella lead sheet contains traces of 80 words, only half of which can be completely read with certainty, many of which can also be found in the Liber Linteus. It was discovered during the 1963–1964 excavations at a sanctuary near Saint Marinella near Pyrgi, now in the Villa Giulia Museum in Rome.
- The Lead Plaque of Magliano contains 73 words, including many names of deities. It seems to be a series of dedications to various gods and ancestors.

=== Inscriptions on monuments ===
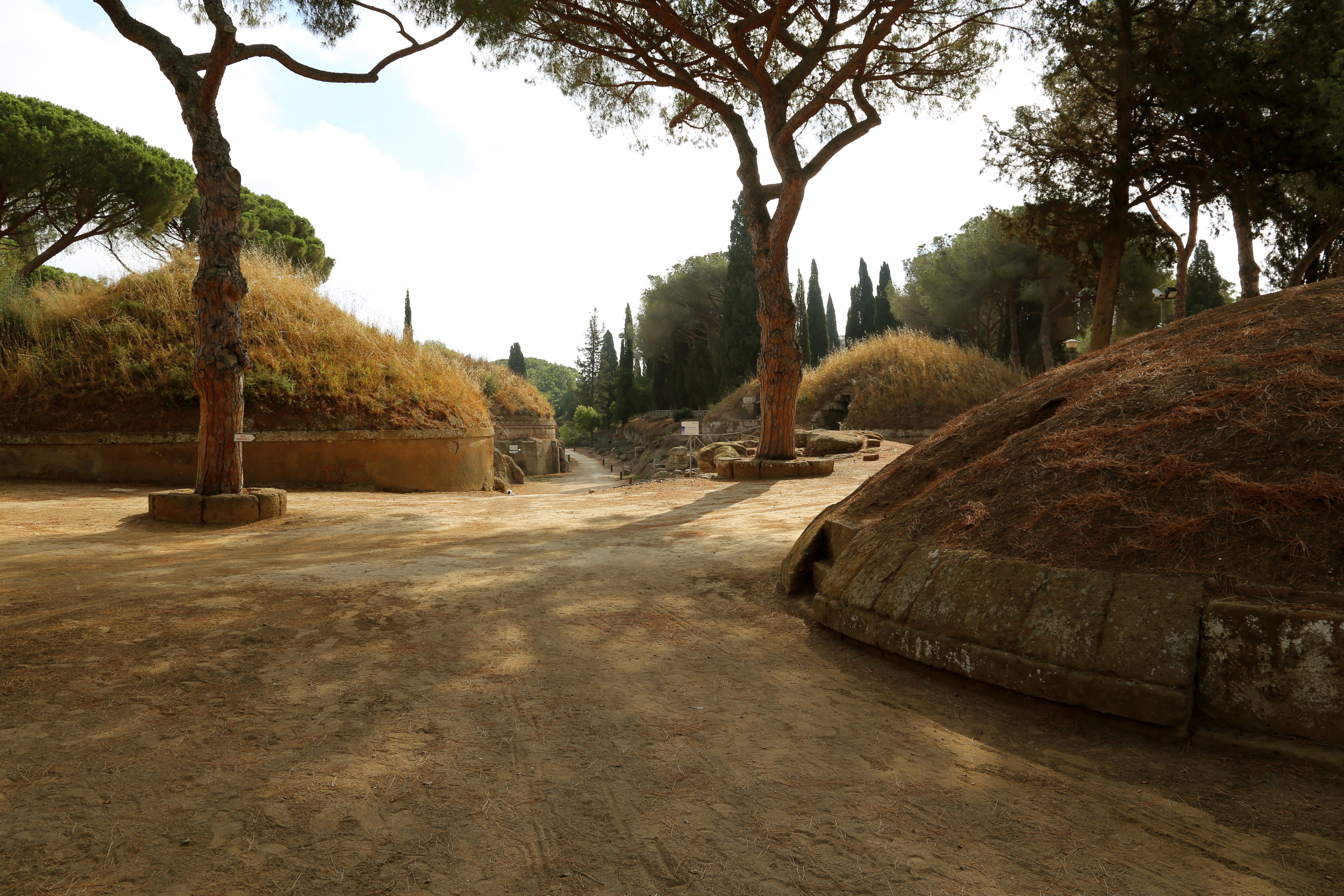
Tumulus on a street at Banditaccia, the main necropolis of Caere

The main material repository of Etruscan civilization, from the modern perspective, is its tombs, all other public and private buildings having been dismantled and the stone reused centuries ago. The tombs are the main source of Etruscan portables, provenance unknown, in collections throughout the world. Their incalculable value has created a brisk black market in Etruscan objets d'art – and equally brisk law enforcement effort, as it is illegal to remove any objects from Etruscan tombs without authorization from the Italian government.

The magnitude of the task involved in cataloguing them means that the total number of tombs is unknown. They are of many types. Especially plentiful are the hypogeal or "underground" chambers or system of chambers cut into tuff and covered by a tumulus. The interior of these tombs represents a habitation of the living stocked with furniture and favorite objects. The walls may display painted murals, the predecessor of wallpaper. Tombs identified as Etruscan date from the Villanovan period to about 100 BC, when presumably the cemeteries were abandoned in favor of Roman ones. Some of the major cemeteries are as follows:

- Caere or Cerveteri, a UNESCO site. Three complete necropoleis with streets and squares. Many hypogea are concealed beneath tumuli retained by walls; others are cut into cliffs. The Banditaccia necropolis contains more than 1,000 tumuli. Access is through a door.
- Tarquinia, Tarquinii or Corneto, a UNESCO site: Approximately 6,000 graves dating from the Villanovan (ninth and eighth centuries BC) distributed in necropoleis, the main one being the Monterozzi hypogea of the sixth–fourth centuries BC. About 200 painted tombs display murals of various scenes with call-outs and descriptions in Etruscan. Elaborately carved sarcophagi of marble, alabaster, and nenfro include identificatory and achievement inscriptions. The Tomb of Orcus at the Scatolini necropolis depicts scenes of the Spurinna family with call-outs.
- Inner walls and doors of tombs and sarcophagi, including the Golini Tomb and the Tomb of Orcus
- The Orator is a bronze statue with a dedicatory inscription of about 13 words in Etruscan
- Engraved steles (tombstones)
- Ossuaries

=== Inscriptions on portable objects ===
==== Votives ====
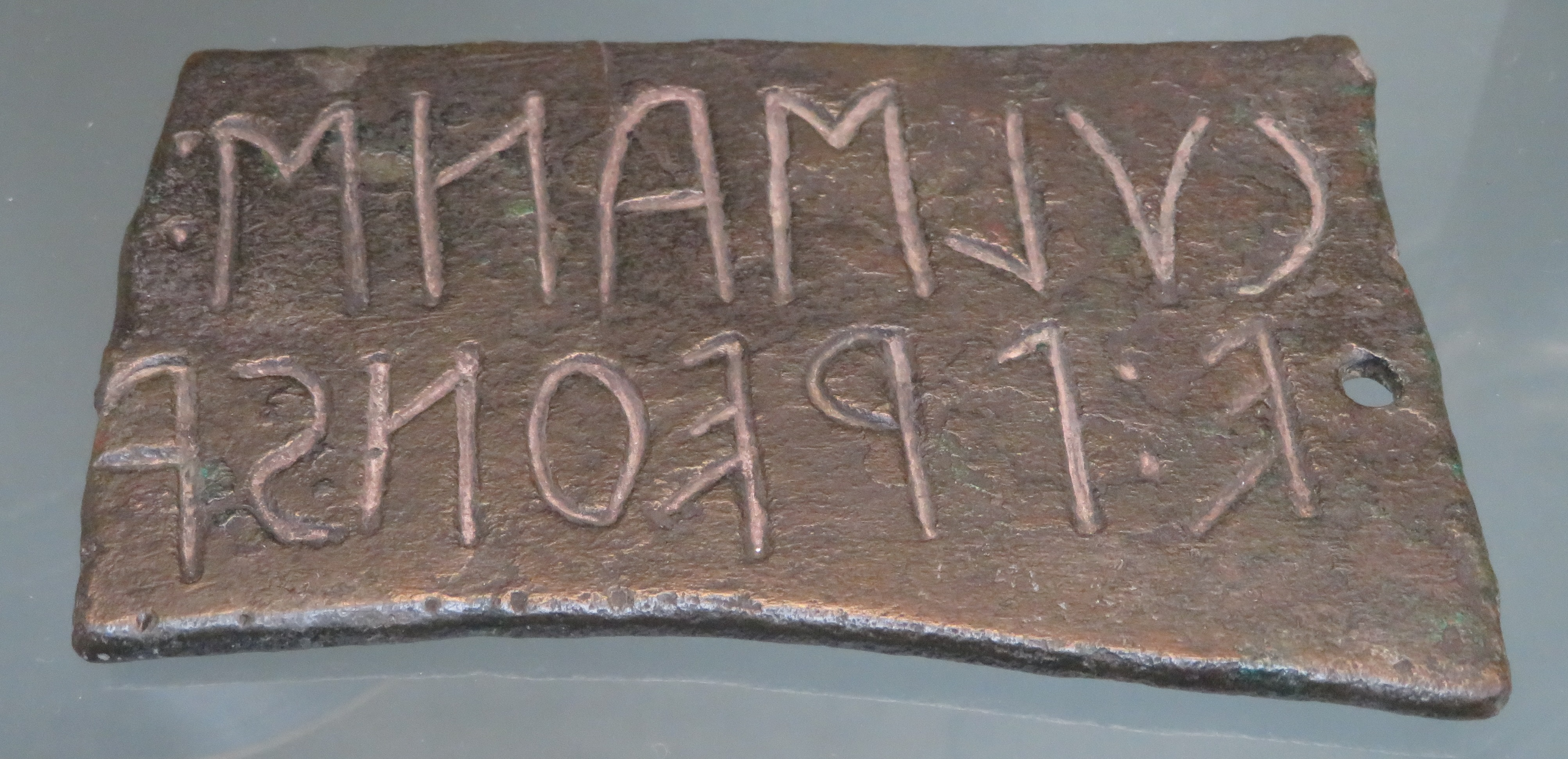
Bronze plaque (300–100 BC) with dedication to Culsans. Inscribed right-to-left is 𐌂𐌖𐌋𐌑𐌀𐌍𐌑⁚𐌄⁚𐌐𐌓𐌄𐌈𐌍𐌔𐌀 (culśanś:e:preθnsa).

One example of an early (pre-fifth century BC) votive inscription is on a bucchero oinochoe (wine vase): ṃiṇi mulvaṇịce venalia ṡlarinaṡ. en mipi kapi ṃi(r) ṇuṇai = "Venalia Ṡlarinaṡ gave me. Do not touch me (?), I (am) nunai (an offering?)." This seems to be a rare case from this early period of a female (Venalia) dedicating the votive.

==== Mirrors ====
A speculum (Latin; the Etruscan word is malena or malstria) is a circular or oval hand-mirror used predominantly by Etruscan women. Specula were cast in bronze as one piece with a tang which was fitted into a wooden, bone, or ivory handle. The reflecting surface was created by polishing the flat side. A higher percentage of tin in the mirror improved its ability to reflect. The other side was convex and featured intaglio or cameo scenes from mythology. The piece was generally ornate.

About 2,300 specula are known from collections all over the world. As they were popular plunderables, the provenance of only a minority is known. An estimated time window is 530–100 BC. Most probably came from tombs. Many bear inscriptions naming the persons depicted in the scenes, so they are often called picture bilinguals. In 1979, Massimo Pallottino, then president of the Istituto di Studi Etruschi ed Italici, initiated the Committee of the Corpus Speculorum Etruscanorum, which resolved to publish all the specula and set editorial standards for doing so. Since then, the committee has grown, acquiring local committees and representatives from most institutions owning Etruscan mirror collections. Each collection is published in its own fascicle by diverse Etruscan scholars.

==== Cistae ====
A cista (Latin for "basket") is a bronze container of circular, ovoid, or more rarely rectangular shape used by women for the storage of sundries. They are ornate, often with feet and lids to which figurines may be attached. The internal and external surfaces bear carefully crafted scenes usually from mythology, usually intaglio, or rarely part intaglio, part cameo.

Cistae date from the Roman Republic, mainly during the fourth and third centuries BC. They may bear various short inscriptions concerning the manufacturer or owner or subject matter. The writing may be Latin, Etruscan, or both. Excavations at Praeneste, a Latin city, turned up about 118 cistae, one of which has been termed "the Praeneste cista" or "the Ficoroni cista", with special reference to its Latin inscription which indicates that it was manufactured by Novios Plutius and given by Dindia Macolnia to her daughter. All of them are more accurately termed "the Praenestine cistae".

==== Rings and ringstones ====
Among the most plunderable portables from the Etruscan tombs of Etruria are the finely engraved gemstones set in patterned gold to form circular or ovoid pieces intended to go on finger rings. Around one centimeter in size, they are dated to the Etruscan apogee from the second half of the sixth to the first centuries BC. The two main theories of manufacture are native Etruscan and Greek. The materials are mainly dark red carnelian, with agate and sard entering usage from the third to the first centuries BC, along with purely gold finger rings with a hollow engraved bezel setting. The engravings, mainly cameo, but sometimes intaglio, depict scarabs at first and then scenes from Greek mythology, often with heroic personages called out in Etruscan. The gold setting of the bezel bears a border design, such as cabling.

==== Coins ====
Etruscan-minted coins can be dated between the 5th and 3rd centuries BC. Use of the 'Chalcidian' standard, based on the silver unit of 5.8 grams, indicates that this custom, like the alphabet, came from Greece. Roman coinage later supplanted Etruscan, but the basic Roman coin, the sesterce, is believed to have been based on the 2.5-denomination Etruscan coin. Etruscan coins have turned up in caches or individually in tombs and in excavations seemingly at random, and concentrated, of course, in Etruria.

Etruscan coins were in gold, silver, and bronze, the gold and silver usually having been struck on one side only. The coins often bore a denomination, sometimes a minting authority name, and a cameo motif. Gold denominations were in units of silver; silver, in units of bronze. Full or abbreviated names are mainly Pupluna (Populonia), Vatl or Veltuna (Vetulonia), Velathri (Volaterrae), Velzu or Velznani (Volsinii) and Cha for Chamars (Camars). Insignia are mainly heads of mythological characters or depictions of mythological beasts arranged in a symbolic motif: Apollo, Zeus, Culsans, Athena, Hermes, griffin, gorgon, male sphinx, hippocamp, bull, snake, eagle, or other creatures which had symbolic significance.

=== Functional categories ===
Wallace et al. include the following categories, based on the uses to which they were put, on their site: abecedaria (alphabets), artisans' texts, boundary markers, construction texts, dedications, didaskalia (instructional texts), funerary texts, legal texts, other/unclear texts, prohibitions, proprietary texts (indicating ownership), religious texts, tesserae hospitales (tokens that establish "the claim of the bearer to hospitality when travelling").

== Phonology ==
In the tables below, conventional letters used for transliterating Etruscan are accompanied by likely pronunciation in IPA symbols within the square brackets, followed by examples of the early Etruscan alphabet which would have corresponded to these sounds.

=== Vowels ===
The Etruscan vowel system consisted of four distinct vowels. The vowels o and u appear to have not been phonetically distinguished based on the nature of the writing system, as only one symbol is used to cover both in loans from Greek (e.g. Greek κώθων kōthōn > Etruscan qutun 'pitcher').

Before the front vowels ⟨c⟩ is used, while ⟨k⟩ and ⟨q⟩ are used before respectively unrounded and rounded back vowels.

Vowels
	Front	Back	
	Front	unrounded	rounded
Close	i [i]		u [u]
Open	e [e]	a [ɑ]	

=== Consonants ===
==== Table of consonants ====
	Bilabial		Dental		Palatal	Velar		Glottal
Nasal	m [m]		n [n̪]					
Plosive	p [p]	φ [pʰ]	t [t̪]	θ [t̪ʰ]		c, k, q [k]	χ [kʰ]	
Affricate			z [t̪͡s̪]					
Fricative	f [ɸ]		s [s̪]		ś [ʃ]			h [h]
Approximant			l [l̪]		i [j]	v [w]		
Rhotic			r [r̪]					

Etruscan also might have had consonants /tʃ/ and /tʃʰ/, as they might be represented in the writing by using two letters, like in the word prumaθś ('great-nephew' or 'great-grandson'). However, this theory is not widely accepted.

==== Absence of voiced stops ====
The Etruscan consonant system primarily distinguished between aspirated and non-aspirated stops. There were no voiced stops. When words from foreign languages were borrowed into Etruscan, voiced stops typically became tenuis stops; one example is Greek thriambos, which became Etruscan triumpus and Latin triumphus.

==== Syllabic theory ====
Based on standard spellings by Etruscan scribes of words without vowels or with unlikely consonant clusters (e.g. cl 'of this (gen.)' and lautn 'freeman'), it is likely that /m, n, l, r/ were sometimes syllabic sonorants (cf. English little, button). Thus cl /kl̩/ and lautn /ˈlɑwtn̩/.

Rix postulates several syllabic consonants, namely /l, r, m, n/ and palatal /lʲ, rʲ, nʲ/ as well as a labiovelar fricative /xʷ/, and some scholars such as Mauro Cristofani also view the aspirates as palatal rather than aspirated but these views are not shared by most Etruscologists. Rix supports his theories by means of variant spellings such as amφare/amφiare, larθal/larθial, aranθ/aranθiia.

== Writing system ==
=== Alphabet ===
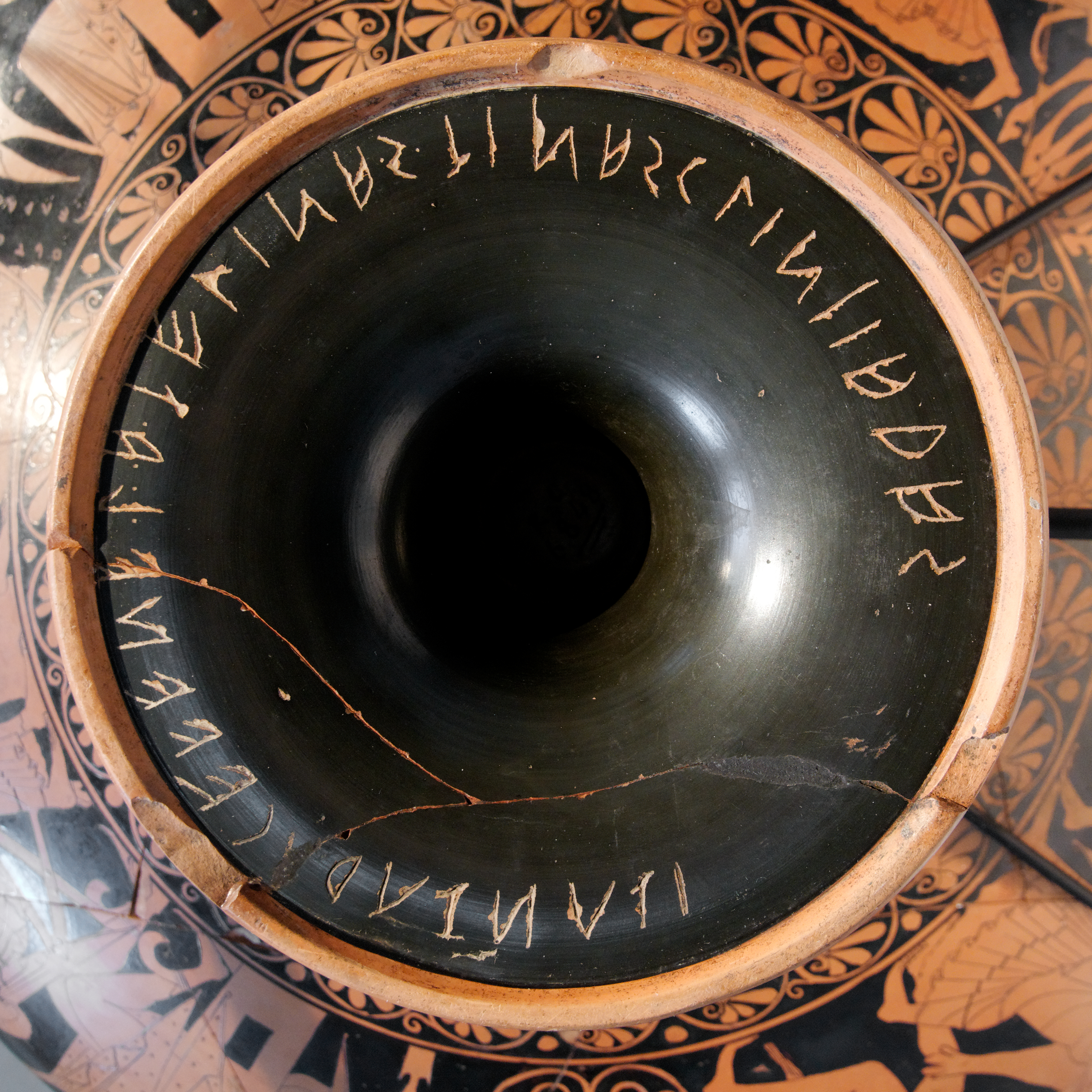
Etruscan dedication to the "sons of Tinia" (Dioscuri) made by Venel Apelinas (or Atelinas), and signed by the potter Euxitheos and the painter Oltos, on the bottom of an Attic red-figure kylix (c. 515–510 BC). Inscription: itum turnce venel apelinas tinas cliniiaras.

The Latin script owes its existence to the Etruscan alphabet, which was adapted for Latin in the form of the Old Italic script. The Etruscan alphabet employs a Euboean variant of the Greek alphabet using the letter digamma and was in all probability transmitted through Pithecusae and Cumae, two Euboean settlements in southern Italy.

The Etruscans recognized a 26-letter alphabet, which makes an early appearance incised for decoration on a small bucchero terracotta lidded vase in the shape of a cockerel at the Metropolitan Museum of Art, c. 650–600 BC. The full complement of 26 has been termed the model alphabet. The Etruscans did not use four letters of it, mainly because Etruscan did not have the voiced stops b, d and g; the o was also not used. They innovated one letter for f (𐌚).

=== Text ===
Writing was from right to left except in archaic inscriptions, which occasionally used boustrophedon. An example found at Cerveteri used left to right. In the earliest inscriptions, the words are continuous. From the 6th century BC, they are separated by a dot or a colon, which might also be used to separate syllables. Writing was phonetic; the letters represented the sounds and not conventional spellings. On the other hand, many inscriptions are highly abbreviated and often casually formed, so the identification of individual letters is sometimes difficult. Spelling might vary from city to city, probably reflecting differences of pronunciation.

=== Complex consonant clusters ===
Speech featured a heavy stress on the first syllable of a word, causing syncopation by weakening of the remaining vowels, which then were not represented in writing: Alcsntre for Alexandros, Rasna for Rasena. This speech habit is one explanation of the Etruscan "impossible" consonant clusters. Some of the consonants, especially resonants, however, may have been syllabic, accounting for some of the clusters (see below under Consonants). In other cases, the scribe sometimes inserted a vowel: Greek Hēraklēs became Hercle by syncopation and then was expanded to Herecele. Pallottino regarded this variation in vowels as "instability in the quality of vowels" and accounted for the second phase (e.g. Herecele) as "vowel harmony, i.e., of the assimilation of vowels in neighboring syllables".

=== Phases ===
The writing system had two historical phases: the archaic from the seventh to fifth centuries BC, which used the early Greek alphabet, and the later from the fourth to first centuries BC, which modified some of the letters. In the later period, syncopation increased.

The alphabet went on in modified form after the language disappeared. In addition to being the source of the Roman and early Oscan and Umbrian alphabets, it has been suggested that it passed northward into Veneto and from there through Raetia into the Germanic lands, where it became the Elder Futhark alphabet, the oldest form of the runes.

== Grammar ==
Etruscan was an agglutinative language, varying the endings of nouns, adjectives, pronouns and verbs with discrete suffixes for each syntactic function. It also had adverbs and conjunctions, whose endings did not vary.

=== Nouns ===
Etruscan substantives had five cases—nominative, accusative, genitive, dative, and locative—and two numbers: singular and a plural. Not all five cases are attested for every word. Nouns merge the nominative and accusative; pronouns do not generally merge these. Gender appears in personal names (masculine and feminine) and in pronouns (animate and inanimate); otherwise, it is not marked.

Compared to many Indo-European languages, Etruscan noun endings were more agglutinative, with some nouns bearing two or three agglutinated suffixes. For example, where Latin would have distinct nominative plural and dative plural endings, Etruscan would suffix the case ending to a plural marker: Latin nominative singular fili-us, 'son', plural fili-i, dative plural fili-is, but Etruscan clan, clen-ar and clen-ar-aśi. Moreover, Etruscan nouns could bear multiple suffixes from the case paradigm alone: that is, Etruscan exhibited Suffixaufnahme. Pallottino calls this phenomenon "morphological redetermination", which he defines as "the typical tendency ... to redetermine the syntactical function of the form by the superposition of suffixes." His example is Uni-al-θi, 'in the sanctuary of Juno', where -al is a genitive ending and -θi a locative.

Steinbauer says of Etruscan, "there can be more than one marker ... to design a case, and ... the same marker can occur for more than one case."

Nominative/accusative case
No distinction is made between nominative and accusative of nouns. The nominative/accusative could act as the subject of transitive and intransitive verbs, but also as the object of transitive verbs, and it was also used to indicate duration of time (e.g., ci avil 'for three years').

Common nouns use the unmarked root. Names of males may end in -e: Hercle (Hercules), Achle (Achilles), Tite (Titus); of females, in -i, -a, or -u: Uni (Juno), Menrva (Minerva), or Zipu. Names of gods may end in -s: Fufluns, Tins; or they may be the unmarked stem ending in a vowel or consonant: Aplu (Apollo), Paχa (Bacchus), or Turan.
Genitive case
The genitive case had two main functions in Etruscan: the usual meaning of possession (along with other forms of dependency such as family relations), and it could also mark the recipient (indirect object) in votive inscriptions.
Pallottino defines two declensions based on whether the genitive ends in -s/-ś or -l. In the -s group are most noun stems ending in a vowel or a consonant: fler/fler-ś, ramtha/ramtha-ś. In the second are names of females ending in i and names of males that end in s, th or n: ati/ati-al, Laris/Laris-al, Arnθ/Arnθ-al. After l or r -us instead of -s appears: Vel/Vel-us. Otherwise, a vowel might be placed before the ending: Arnθ-al instead of Arnθ-l.
According to Rex Wallace, "A few nouns could be inflected with both types of endings without any difference in meaning. Consider, for example, the genitives cilθσ 'fortress (?)' and cilθl. Why this should be the case is not clear."
There is a patronymic ending: -sa or -isa, 'son of', but the ordinary genitive might serve that purpose. In the genitive case, morphological redetermination becomes elaborate. Given two male names, Vel and Avle, Vel Avleś means 'Vel son of Avle'. This expression in the genitive become Vel-uś Avles-la. Pallottino's example of a three-suffix form is Arnθ-al-iśa-la.
Dative case
Besides the usual function as indirect object ('to/for'), this case could be used as the agent ('by') in passive clauses, and occasionally as a locative. Wallace uses the term 'pertinentive' for this case. The dative ending is -si: Tita/Tita-si.
Locative case
The locative ending is -θi: Tarχna/Tarχna-l-θi.
Plural number
Nouns semantically [+human] had the plural marking -ar : clan, 'son', as clenar, 'sons'. This shows both umlaut and an ending -ar. Plurals for cases other than nominative are made by agglutinating the case ending on clenar. Nouns semantically [-human] used the plural -chve or one of its variants: -cva or -va: avil 'year', avil-χva 'years'; zusle 'zusle (pig?)‐offering', zusle-va 'zusle‐offerings'.

=== Pronouns ===
Personal pronouns refer to persons; demonstrative pronouns point out English this, that, there.

==== Personal ====
The first-person personal pronoun has a nominative mi ('I') and an accusative mini ('me'). The third person has a personal form an ('he'/'she'/'they') and an inanimate in ('it'). The second person is uncertain but some scholars, such as the Bonfantes, have claimed a dative singular une ('to thee') and an accusative singular un ('thee').

==== Demonstrative ====
The demonstratives, ca and ta, are used without distinction for 'that' or 'this'. The nominative–accusative singular forms are: ica, eca, ca, ita, ta; the plural: cei, tei. There is a genitive singular: cla, tla, cal and plural clal. The accusative singular: can, cen, cn, ecn, etan, tn; plural cnl 'these/those'. Locative singular: calti, ceiθi, clθ(i), eclθi; plural caiti, ceiθi.

=== Adjectives ===
Though uninflected for number, adjectives were inflected for case, agreeing with their noun: mlaχ 'good' versus genitive mlakas 'of (the) good...'

Adjectives fall into a number of types formed from nouns with a suffix:

- quality, -u, -iu or -c: ais/ais-iu, 'god/divine'; zamaθi/zamθi-c, 'gold/golden'
- possession or reference, -na, -ne, -ni: paχa/paχa-na, 'Bacchus, Bacchic'; laut/laut-ni, 'family/familiar' (in the sense of servant)
- collective, -cva, -chva, -cve, -χve, -ia: sren/sren-cva: 'figure/figured'; etera/etera-ia, 'slave/servile'

=== Adverbs ===
Adverbs are unmarked: etnam, 'again'; θui, 'now, here'; θuni, 'at first' (compare θu 'one'). Most Indo-European adverbs are formed from the oblique cases, which become unproductive and descend to fixed forms. Cases such as the ablative are therefore called adverbial. If there is any such widespread system in Etruscan, it is not obvious from the relatively few surviving adverbs.

The negative adverb is ei (for examples, see below in Imperative moods).

=== Conjunctions ===
The two enclitic coordinate conjunctions ‐ka/‐ca/‐c 'and' and -um/‐m 'and, but' coordinated phrases and clauses, but phrases could also be coordinated without any conjunction (asyndetic).

=== Verbs ===
Verbs had an indicative mood, an imperative mood and others. Tenses were present and past. The past tense had an active voice and a passive voice.

==== Present active ====
Etruscan used a verbal root with a zero suffix or -a without distinction to number or person: ar, ar-a, 'he, she, we, you, they make'.

==== Past or preterite active ====
Adding the suffix -(a)ce' to the verb root produces an active form which has been called variously a "past", a "preterite", a "perfect". In contrast to Indo-European, this form is not marked for person. Examples: tur 'gives, dedicates' versus tur-ce 'gave, dedicated'; sval 'lives' versus sval-ce 'lived'.

==== Past passive ====
The third-person past passive is formed with -che: mena/mena-ce/mena-che, 'offers/offered/was offered'.

==== Imperative mood ====
The imperative was formed with the simple, uninflected root of the verb: tur 'dedicate!', σ́uθ 'put!', trin 'speak!' and nunθen 'invoke!').

The imperative capi 'take, steal' is found in anti‐theft inscriptions:

mi χuliχna cupe.s. .a.l.θ.r.nas .e.i minipi c̣api... (Cm 2.13; fifth century BC)
'I (am) the bowl of Cupe Althr̥na. Don't steal me!'

==== Other modals ====
Verbs with the suffix ‐a indicated the jussive mood, with the force of commanding, or exhorting (within a subjunctive framework).

ein θui ara enan
'No one should put/make (?) anything here (θui).'

Verbs ending in ‐ri referred to obligatory activities:

celi . huθiσ . zaθrumiσ . flerχva . neθunσl . σucri . θezeric
'On September twenty six, victims must be offered (?) and sacrificed (?) to Nethuns.'

==== Participles ====
Verbs formed participles in a variety of ways, among the most frequently attested being -u in lup-u 'dead' from lup- 'die'.

Participles could also be formed with ‐θ. These referred to activities that were contemporaneous with that of the main verb: trin‐θ '(while) speaking', nunθen‐θ '(while) invoking', and heχσ‐θ '(while) pouring (?)'.

=== Postpositions ===
Typical of SOV agglutinative languages, Etruscan had postpositions rather than prepositions, each governing a specific case.

=== Syntax ===
Etruscan is considered to have been a SOV language with postpositions, but the word order was not strict and the orders OVS and OSV are, in fact, more frequent in commemorative inscriptions from the archaic period, presumably as a stylistic feature of the genre. Adjectives were usually placed after the noun.

== Vocabulary ==
=== Borrowings from and to Etruscan ===
Only a few hundred words of the Etruscan vocabulary are understood with some certainty. The exact count depends on whether the different forms and the expressions are included. Below is a table of some of the words grouped by topic.

Some words with corresponding Latin or other Indo-European forms are likely loanwords to or from Etruscan. For example, neftś 'nephew', is probably from Latin (Latin nepōs, nepōtis; this is a cognate of German Neffe, Old Norse nefi). A number of words and names proposed to be of Etruscan origin survived in Latin.

In addition to words believed to have been borrowed into Etruscan from Indo-European or elsewhere, there is a corpus of words such as familia which seem to have been borrowed into Latin from the older Etruscan civilization as a superstrate influence. Some of these words still have widespread currency in English and Latin-influenced languages. Other words believed to have a possible Etruscan origin include:

arena
from arēna 'arena' < harēna, 'arena, sand' < archaic hasēna < Sabine fasēna, unknown Etruscan word as the basis for fas- with Etruscan ending -ēna.
belt
from balteus, 'sword belt'; the sole connection between this word and Etruscan is a statement by Marcus Terentius Varro that it was of Etruscan origin. All else is speculation.
market
from Latin mercātus, of obscure origin, perhaps Etruscan.
military
from Latin mīles 'soldier'; either from Etruscan or related to Greek homilos, 'assembled crowd' (compare homily).
person
from Middle English persone, from Old French persone, from Latin persōna, 'mask', probably from Etruscan phersu, 'mask'.
satellite
from Latin satelles, meaning 'bodyguard, attendant', perhaps from Etruscan satnal. Whatmough considers Latin satelles "as one of our securest Etruscan loans in Latin."

=== Etruscan vocabulary ===
==== Numerals ====
Much debate has been carried out about a possible Indo-European origin of the Etruscan cardinals. In the words of Larissa Bonfante (1990), "What these numerals show, beyond any shadow of a doubt, is the non-Indo-European nature of the Etruscan language". Conversely, other scholars, including Francisco R. Adrados, Albert Carnoy, Marcello Durante, Vladimir Georgiev, Alessandro Morandi and Massimo Pittau, have proposed a close phonetic proximity of the first ten Etruscan numerals to the corresponding numerals in other Indo-European languages.

The lower Etruscan numerals are:

Etruscan numerals
Value	Decimal interpretation	Duodecimal interpretation
1	θu [tʰu] ~ θun ~ tu ~ tun	
2	zal [t͡sal]	
3	ci [ki] ~ ki (~ χi?)	
4	śa [ʃa] ~ sa or huθ [hutʰ] ~ hut	huθ [hutʰ] ~ hut
5	maχ [makʰ] ~ *maχv-	
6	huθ [hutʰ] ~ hut or śa [ʃa] ~ sa	śa [ʃa] ~ sa
7	śemφ [ʃempʰ]	
8	*cezp [ket͡sp]	
9	nurφ- [nurpʰ]	
10	śar [ʃar] ~ zar [t͡sar]	halχ [halkʰ]
11	*θuśar [tʰuʃar] "one-ten"	?
12	*zalśar [t͡salʃar] "two-ten"	śar [ʃar] ~ zar [t͡sar] "twelve"
13	ci- śar- [kiʃar] "three-ten"	*θuśar?
14	*śaśar [ʃaʃar] or huθzar [hutʰt͡sar] "four-ten"	*zalśar?
15	*maχśar [makʰʃar] "five-ten"	ci- śar- "three-twelve"
16	huθzar- [hutʰt͡sar] or *śaśar [ʃaʃar] "six-ten"	huθzar- [hutʰt͡sar] "four-twelve"
17	ciem zaθrum [ki-em t͡satʰum] "three from twenty"	
18	eslem zaθrum [esl-em t͡satʰum] "two from twenty"	
19	θunem zaθrum [tʰun-em t͡satʰum] "one from twenty"	
20	zaθrum [t͡satʰrum] "tw-?"	
30	cealχ [tkealkʰ] "three-ty/ten"	
40	śealχ [ʃealkʰ] or *huθalχ [hutʰalkʰ] "four-ty"	*huθalχ- "four-ten"
50	muvalχ [muwalkʰ] "five-ty/ten"	
60	*huθalχ [hutʰalkʰ] or śealχ [ʃealkʰ] "six-ty"	śealχ [ʃealkʰ] "six-ten"
70	śemφalχ [ʃempʰalkʰ] "seven-ty/ten"	
80	cezpalχ [ket͡spalkʰ] "eight-ty/ten"	
90	*nurφalχ [nurpʰalkʰ] "nine-ty/ten"	
100	śimth [ʃimt] "one hundred"	

It is unclear which of semφ, cezp, and nurφ are 7, 8 and 9. Śar may also mean 'twelve', with halχ for 'ten'.

For higher numbers, it has been determined that zaθrum is 20, cealχ/*cialχ 30, *huθalχ 40, muvalχ 50, šealχ 60, and semφalχ and cezpalχ any two in the series 70–90. Śran is 100 (clearly < śar 10, just as Proto-Indo-European *dḱm̥tom- 100 is from *deḱm- 10). Further, θun-z, e-sl-z, ci-z(i) mean 'once, twice, and thrice' respectively; θun[š]na and *kisna 'first' and 'third'; θunur, zelur 'one by one', 'two by two'; and zelarve- and śarve are 'double' and 'quadruple'.

==== Core vocabulary ====
Etruscan	English
Family
apa	father
apana	paternal
papa, papacs	grandfather
ati, ativu	mother
ati nacna	grandmother
puia	wife
tusurθir	married couple
clan, clenar (plural)	son
papals, papacs	of the grandfather, grandson
sec, sech	daughter
ruva	brother
neftś, nefś, nefiś	nephew (Latin: nepot-)
prumaθ, prumaθś, prumats, prumts	great-nephew or great-grandson
nene	nurse, wet nurse
snenaθ, snenath	maid, companion
hus-	youth
husiur	children
pava	boy
taliθa	girl, in the specific sense of "marriageable girl", or a proper name (attested only once in a mirror, 400–350 BC from Vulci. Likely a proper name rendering of the accusative case of the Greek talis, Τάλις. Greek: Talitha, ταλιθα)
lautun, lautn	gens, people (IE *h₁lewdʰ-, 'people')
lautni	freedman (IE *h₁léwdʰ-eros, 'free', 'pertaining to the people')
lautniθa, lautnita	freedwoman
etera, eteri	foreigner, slave, client (Greek ἕτερος)
afr-	ancestors
nacnvaia	those who come next (that is posterity)
Society
aesar	god
Rasenna, Rasna	Etruscans?
meχl Rasnal	Etruria?, or equivalent to Latin res publica
pes	land
tul	stone
tular, tularu	boundaries
tular rasnal	public boundaries
tular spural	city boundaries
vaχr	contract
tudthi, tuθiu, tuθi, tuti	state
tuθin, tuθina	public
mech	people
meχl, meθlum	nation, league, district
spur, śpur	civitas, populus
spureni, spurana	civic
θruna	sovereignty
lucair	to rule
lauχum	king, prince
lauχumna	regal, palace
tenve, tenine, tenu, tenθas	hold office
zil, zilac, zilc, zilaχ, zilath	praetor
camthi	unknown magistrates or magistracies
ceχase	unknown magistrates or magistracies
parniχ	unknown magistrates or magistracies
macstreve	unknown magistrates or magistracies
maru, marunu, marniu, marunuχ, maruχva	unknown magistrates or magistracies
purθ, purθne	unknown magistrates or magistracies
tamera	unknown magistrates or magistracies
cepen, cipen	priest
cepen tutin	village priest?
cepen ceren	tomb priest
cepen θaurχ	tomb priest
cepen cilθ-cva	priest of the citadel-s/hilltop-s
cepen cnticn-θ	local priest?
cepen χuru	arch-priest?

Etruscan	English
Time
tin-	day; cf. Tinia
θesan	morning, day; cf. Thesan
uslane	at noon
tiur, tivr, tiu	month, moon
avil	year
ril	at the age of
Velcitna	March
c-Apre-	April
Ampile	May
Acale	June
Hermi	August or summer?
Celi	September
Chosfer	October
Masan, Masn	unknown month?
Nature
anθa	northwind, eagle (Latin: aquila)
arac	sparrow-hawk, falcon (possibly Greek ἱέραξ)
arim	monkey
capu	falcon
falatu	sky
hiuls	screech-owl
leu	lion (Latin: leo)
pulumχva	stars
thamna	horse
thevru	bull (Latin: taurus)
tisś	lake
tiu	moon
θi	water
usil	sun (Latin: sol); Cf. Usil
vers-	fire
Vessels
aska	Greek ἄσκος áskos 'wineskin'
aska eleivana	olive oil flask
cape, capi	container (perhaps Latin capio 'take' or capis 'one-handled bowl')
capra	urn
cletram	Umbrian kletra, a basin or basket
culiχna	κύλιξ, a large wine-cup
cupe	κύπη or Latin cūpa, English cup
leχtum	λήκυθος, a small bottle
leχtumuza	a small lechtum
patna	πατάνη, a bowl
pruχ, pruχum	πρόχоυς, a ewer
qutun, qutum	κώθων, a vessel of Laconia
qutumuza	small qutum
θafna	chalice
θina, tina	derived from θi 'water'
Common verbs
a-cas	to make (an offering...)
am-	to be
ar	to make sacred
ara	to dedicate
cenu	(is) obtained
cer-	to make, construct
cesu	to place, lay, deposit
lupu	to die
mal-	(over)see; reflect?
mene-	make (a dedication?)
mulu-	to offer, give
nunθe-	invoke, offer
pi-cas-	make (an offering) (compare a-cas- above)
sac-	carry out a sacred act; consecrate
ścu-	make good, finish (compare ścuna "(proper) use")
sval	to live
thamu-	establish, erect
trin-	to say
trut	officiate
tur-	to give
zin	to work, decorate
zivas	to live
ziχ-	to write, engrave

== Sample texts ==
From Tabula Capuana: (/ indicates line break; text from Alessandro Morandi Epigrafia Italica Rome, 1982, p. 40)

First section probably for March (lines 1–7):

...vacil.../2ai savcnes satiriasa.../3...[nunθ?]eri θuθcu
vacil śipir śuri leθamsul ci tartiria /4 cim cleva acasri halχ tei
vacil iceu śuni savlasie...

m/5uluri zile picasri savlasieis

vacil lunaśie vaca iχnac fuli/6nuśnes
vacil savcnes itna

muluri zile picasri iane

vacil l/7eθamsul scuvune marzac saca⋮

Start of second section for April (apirase) (starting on line 8):

iśvei tule ilucve apirase leθamsul ilucu cuiesχu perpri

cipen apires /9 racvanies huθ zusle

rithnai tul tei

snuza in te hamaiθi civeis caθnis fan/10iri
marza in te hamaiθi ital sacri utus ecunza iti alχu scuvse

riθnai tu/11 l tei

ci zusle acun siricima nunθeri
eθ iśuma zuslevai apire nunθer/i...

== See also ==
- Combinatorial method (linguistics)
- Corpus Inscriptionum Etruscarum
- Etruscan alphabet
- Etruscan civilization
- Etruscan documents
  - Liber Linteus – An Etruscan linen book that ended as mummy wraps in Egypt.
  - Tabula Cortonensis – An Etruscan inscription.
  - Cippus perusinus – An Etruscan inscription.
  - Pyrgi Tablets – Bilingual Etruscan-Phoenician golden leaves.
- Etruscan mythology
- Etruscan numerals
- Lemnian language
- List of English words of Etruscan origin
- Raetic language
- Helmut Rix
- Tyrrhenian languages

== Notes and references ==
=== Bibliography ===
- Adams, J. N. (2003). Bilingualism and the Latin Language. Cambridge University Press. ISBN 0-521-81771-4. Available for preview on Google Books.
- Agostiniani, Luciano (2013). "The Etruscan Language". In MacIntosh Turfa, Jean (ed.). The Etruscan World. Abingdon: Routledge. pp. 457–477. ISBN 978-1-138-06035-7.
- Belfiore, Valentina (2020). "Etrusco" [Etruscan]. Palaeohispanica (in Italian). 20 (20): 199–262. doi:10.36707/palaeohispanica.v0i20.382.
- Benelli, Enrico, ed. (2009). Indice lessicale. Thesaurus Linguae Etruscae. Vol. I (2nd ed.). Pisa/Rome: Fabrizio Serra Editore. ISBN 978-88-6227-135-6.
- Benelli, Enrico (2020). Etrusco. Lingua, scrittura, epigrafia [Etruscan. Language, Scipt, Epigraphy]. Aelaw Booklet (in Italian). Zaragoza: Prensas de la Universidad de Zaragoza. ISBN 978-84-1340-055-6.
- Bellelli, Vincenzo; Benelli, Enrico (2018). Gli Etruschi: la scrittura, la lingua, la società [The Etruscans: The Script, the Language, the Society] (in Italian). Rome: Carocci Editore. ISBN 978-88-430-9309-0.
- Bonfante, Giuliano; Bonfante, Larissa (2002). The Etruscan Language: an Introduction. Manchester: University of Manchester Press. ISBN 0-7190-5540-7.
- Bonfante, Larissa (1990). Etruscan. Berkeley: University of California Press. ISBN 0-520-07118-2. LCCN 90031371. OCLC 1285554699.
- Cristofani, Mauro (1979). The Etruscans: A New Investigation (Echoes of the ancient world). Orbis Pub. ISBN 0-85613-259-4.
- Cristofani, Mauro; et al. (1984). Gli Etruschi: una nuova immagine [The Etruscans: A new picture] (in Italian). Florence: Giunti Martello.
- Facchetti, Giulio M. (2000). L'enigma svelato della lingua etrusca. Rome: Newton & Compton. ISBN 978-88-8289-458-0.
- Facchetti, Giulio M. (2002). Appunti di morfologia etrusca. Con un'appendice sulle questioni delle affinità genetiche dell'etrusco. Rome: Olshcki. ISBN 978-88-222-5138-1.
- Facchetti, G. (2000) Frammenti di diritto privato etrusco Florence: Olschki.
- Hadas-Lebel, J. (2016). Les cas locaux en étrusque. Rome.
- Maras, Daniele (2013). "Numbers and reckoning: A whole civilization founded upon divisions", in The Etruscan World. Ed. Jean MacIntosh Turfa. Abingdon: Routledge, pp. 478–91.
- Pallottino, M. (ed.) (1954) Testimonia Linguae Etruscae. Firenze.
- Pallottino, Massimo (1955a). The Etruscans. Translated by Cremona, J. Harmondsworth, Middlesex: Penguin Books. LCCN 56000053. OCLC 1034661909.
- Penney, John H. (2009). "The Etruscan language and its Italic context", in Etruscan by Definition. Eds. Judith Swaddling & Philip Perkins. London: British Museum, pp. 88–93.
- Pfiffig, A.J. (1969) Die etruskische Sprache, Graz.
- Rix, Helmut (1991). Etruskische Texte. G. Narr. ISBN 3-8233-4240-1. 2 vols.
- Whatmough, M.M.T. (1997) "Studies in the Etruscan loanwords in Latin" (Biblioteca di 'Studi Etruschi' 33), Firenze.
- Rix, Helmut (1998). Rätisch und Etruskisch. Innsbruck: Institut für Sprachwissenschaft. ISBN 3-85124-670-5
- Rix, Helmut (2004). "Etruscan". In Woodard, Roger D. (ed.). The Cambridge Encyclopedia of the World's Ancient Languages. Cambridge: Cambridge University Press. pp. 943–966. ISBN 978-0-521-56256-0.
- Rodríguez Adrados, Francisco (2005). "El etrusco como indoeuropeo anatolio: viejos y nuevos argumentos" [Etruscan as an Indoeuropean Anatolian Language: Old and New Arguments]. Emerita (in Spanish). 73 (1): 45–56. doi:10.3989/emerita.2005.v73.i1.52. hdl:10261/7115.
- Steinbauer, Dieter H. (1999). Neues Handbuch des Etruskischen. Scripta Mercaturae. ISBN 3-89590-080-X.
- Torelli, Marco, ed. (2001). The Etruscans. London: Thames and Hudson. ISBN 978-0-500-51033-9.
- Wallace, Rex E. (2008). Zikh Rasna: A Manual of the Etruscan Language and Inscriptions. Beech Stave Press. ISBN 978-0-9747927-4-3.
- Wallace, Rex E. (2016). "Language, Alphabet, and Linguistic Affiliation". A Companion to the Etruscans. pp. 203–223. doi:10.1002/9781118354933.ch14. ISBN 978-1-118-35274-8.
- Wylin, Koen (2000). Il verbo etrusco. Ricerca morfosintattica delle forme usate in funzione verbale [The Etruscan Verb. Morphosyntactical Research of the Forms Used in Verbal Function] (in Italian). Rome: "L' Erma" di Bretschneider. ISBN 88-8265-084-7.
