= Robert Ellis (classicist) =

English classical scholar (c. 1820–1885)

Robert Ellis (c.1820–1885) was an English classical scholar.

== Life ==
The son of John Ellis of Peckham, Ellis was admitted a member of St. John's College, Cambridge, 9 April 1836, elected a scholar 5 November 1839, and graduated B.A. as fifth wrangler in 1840, obtaining a fellowship 20 March 1841. He took his M.A. degree in 1843, and was ordained two years later. In 1850 he commenced B.D. He vacated his fellowship by his marriage, 2 April 1872, at Meole Brace, near Shrewsbury, to Jane, daughter of Francis France of Nobold, Shropshire. He died, 20 December 1885, at 3 Higher Summerlands, Exeter, aged 65. He is chiefly known by his sharp controversy with William John Law, which ranged from 1854 to 1885, on the route followed by Hannibal in his passage of the Alps. Ellis had investigated the subject during excursions in the Alps in July 1852 and in April and May 1853.

== Works ==
- A Treatise on Hannibal's Passage of the Alps, in which his route is traced over the Little Mount Cenis, 8vo, Cambridge [printed], London, 1853. On this subject he also wrote two elaborate dissertations in December 1855 and in March 1856 in The Journal of Classical and Sacred Philology (ii, 308-29, iii. 1-34), which are entitled 'Observations on Mr. Law's "Criticism of Mr. Ellis's new Theory concerning the Route of Hannibal."'
- Contributions to the Ethnography of Italy and Greece, 8vo, London, 1858.
- The Armenian Origin of the Etruscans, 8vo, London, 1861.
- An Enquiry into the Ancient Routes between Italy and Gaul; with an examination of the Theory of Hannibal's Passage of the Alps by the Little St. Bernard, 8vo, Cambridge, 1867.
- The Asiatic Affinities of the Old Italians, 8vo, London, 1870.
- On Numerals as Signs of Primeval Unity among Mankind, 8vo, London, 1873.
- Peruvia Scythica. The Quichus Language of Peru; its derivation from Central Asia with the American Languages in general, and with the Turanian and Iberian Languages of the Old World, &c., 8vo, London, 1875.
- Etruscan Numerals, 8vo, London, 1876.
- Sources of the Etruscan and Basque Languages [with a preface by Mrs. Jane Ellis], 8vo, London, 1886.
