= Cippus Perusinus =

Etruscan stone tablet

Coordinates: 43°07′39″N 12°21′57″E

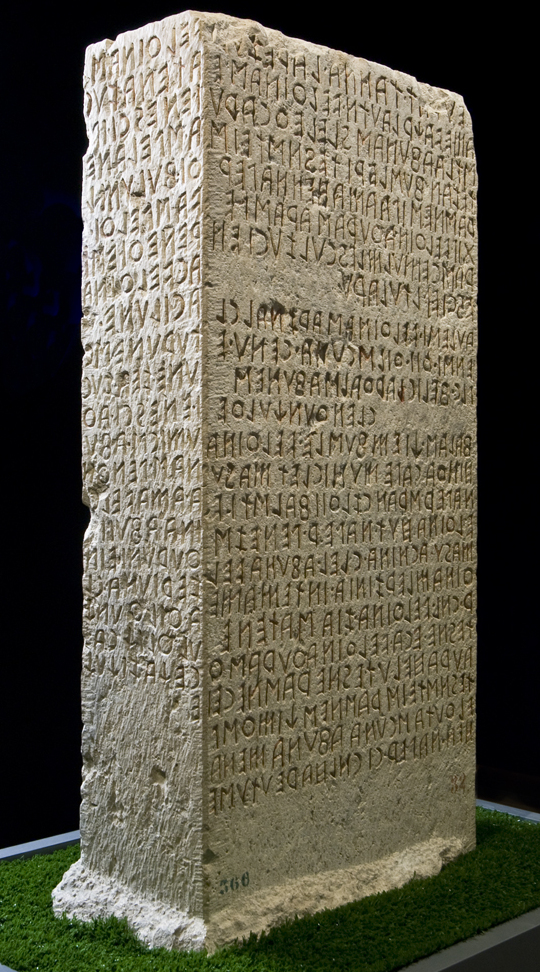
- Material: Stone
- Discovered: 1822; Perugia, Umbria, Italy
- Present location: Perugia, Umbria, Italy
- Language: Etruscan language

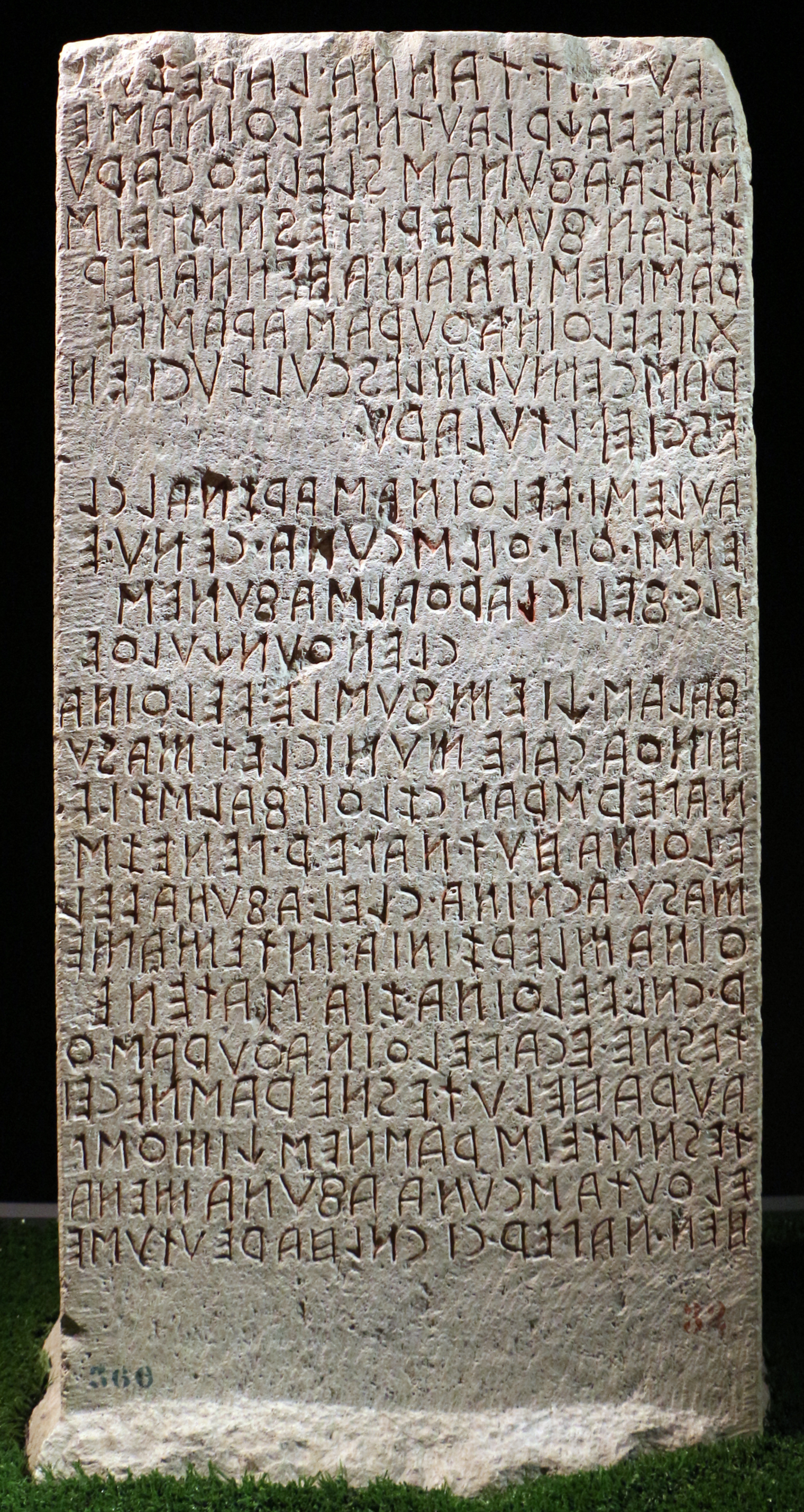
The Cippus of Perugia, 3rd or 2nd century BC

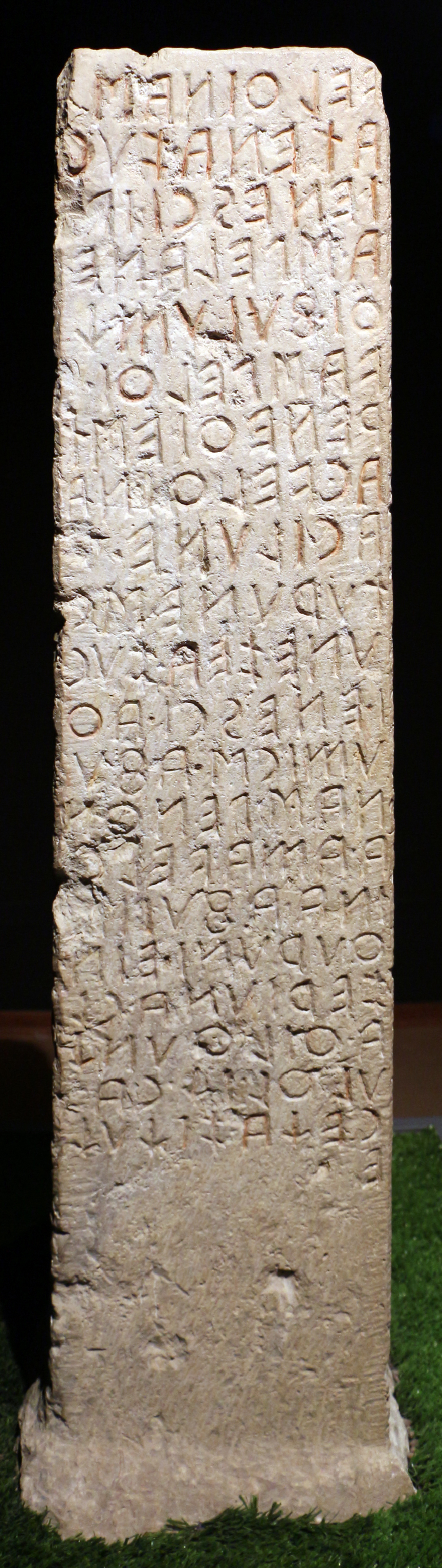
Side view

The Cippus Perusinus is a stone tablet (cippus) discovered on the hill of San Marco, in Perugia, Italy, in 1822. The tablet bears 46 lines of incised Etruscan text, about 130 words. The cippus, which seems to have been a border stone, appears to display a text dedicating a legal contract between the Etruscan families of Velthina (from Perugia) and Afuna (from Chiusi), regarding the sharing or use, including water rights, of a property upon which there was a tomb belonging to the noble Velthinas.

The date of the inscription is considered to be 3rd or 2nd century BC. The Cippus is conserved in the National Archeological Museum of Perugia.

== Original text ==
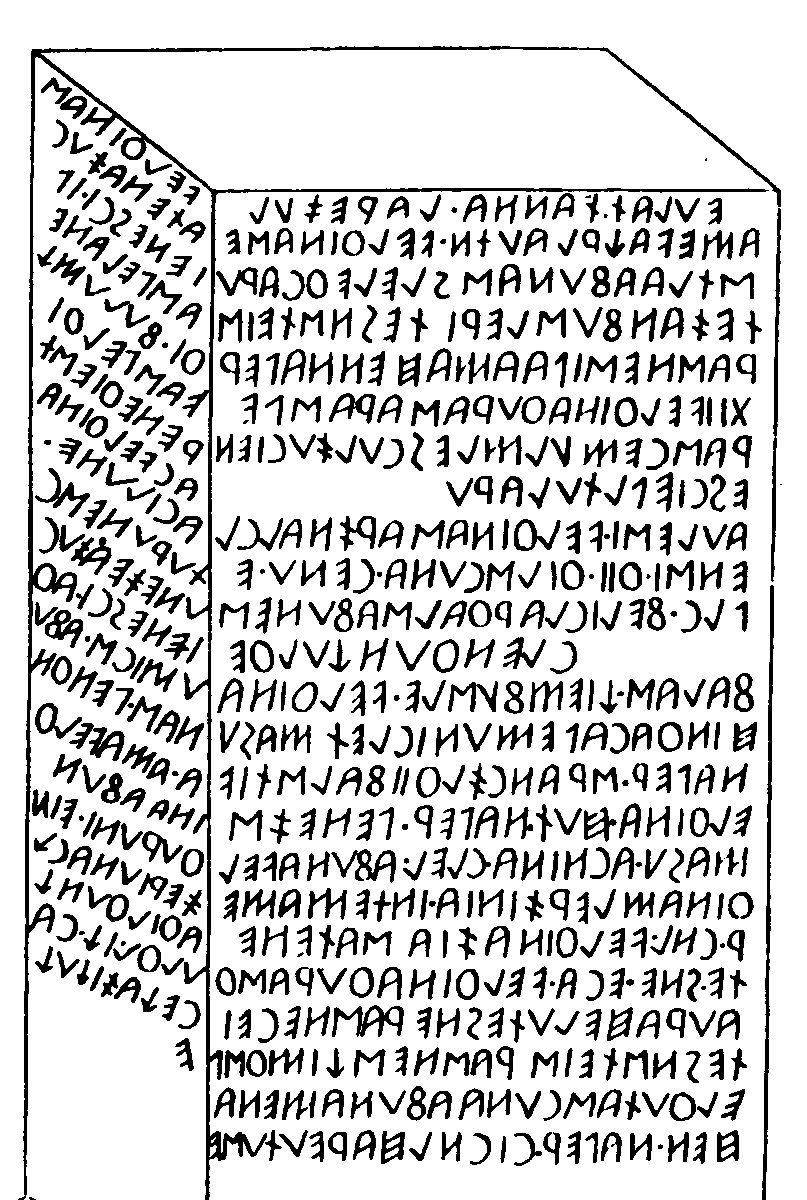
Text transcription

Formatted according to latest theory by F. Roncalli for the original lines, distorted when they were copied onto this stone. There are no capital letters in the original, but known and certain names are capitalized below. Line numbers in parentheses indicate those of the actual cippus. Word spacing is mostly hypothetical.

=== Front ===
(1) [t]eurat · tanna · La Rezu L /(2) ame vaχr lautn ·
Velθinaś e/(3)śtla Afunaś sleleθ caru/
(4) tezan fuśleri tesnś teiś /(5) raśneś ipa ama
hen naper /(6) XII ( twelve ) Velθinaθuraś araś pe/(7)raśc
emulm lescul zuci en/(8)esci epl tularu/

(9) Aulesi Velθinas Arznal cl/(10)ensi · θii · θil
ścuna · cenu e/(11)plc felic Larθalś Afuneś/

(13!) falaś χiem fuśle Velθina /(12!)[...] clen θunχulθe/
(14) hinθa cape municlet masu / (15) naper śran czl
θii falaśt V/(16)elθina hut naper penezś/
(17) masu acnina · clel · Afuna Vel/(18)θina mler
zinia inte mame/(19)r cnl Velθina zia śatene/

(20) tesne eca Velθina θuraś θ/(21)aura helu
tesne raśne cei /(22) tesnś teiś raśneś
χimθ śp/(23)el θuta ścuna Afuna mena /(24) hen
naper ci cnl hare utuśe /...

=== Tentative translation ===
From van der Meer (following Facchetti and others) with some adjustments of word order:

La(rt) Rezul, son of Lart, was the arbitrator for this (case). The family (lautn)
of Velthina took (caru) an oath (vaχr) along with one (member) from (the family) of Athuna.
May they accept (fusle-ri?) (this) as property (tezan?) according to the Etruscan law (tesnś teiś raśneś), that (there) be
12 measures (naper) of (or "for"?) the Velthina (family), both moving (through it) and crossing (it) (araś peraśc?),
(that is) in length and in width (emulm lescul), through our declaration (zuci enesci?), up to the place of (these?) boundary stone(s).
As to Aule Velthinas, son of Arznei, (and) as to the water: He (Aule) may grant (ścuna) the (drawing) of water (θil)
(which was) acquired (cenu), both for ep- and with the (appropriate?) price (feli?), by Larth Afuna.
(As for?) the stake (falaś), Velthina [NAME's?] son, by covenant (θunχulθe), holds (cape) every property (χiem fuśle) behind it (i.e. the stake).
In the sacred place, (there are) five measures (of land), their
(extent stretching) between the water and the stake. Velthina may own (acnina) six measures next to five (?).
Afuna may satisfy (mlerzinia) Velthina on these (things),
about which (things) (he is) guarantor (mamer). Velthina disposes (śatene) these things (as is) right (zia).
By law this tomb (is) the Velthina family's own tomb,
through this Etruscan disposition according to the Etruscan law.
In sum, (the agreement) allows only one carve out (śpel) (or 'exception'; literally 'cave' 'cavity'): Afuna may keep
three measures (of land) here. Across these, he (may) enter (hare?)and lead (utuśe) (livestock)...

=== Side ===
(25)...Velθina ś/(26)atena
zuc/(27)i enesci · i/(28)pa · śpelane/(29)θi · fulumχ/(30)va ·
śpelθi · /(31) reneθi · eśt/(32)ac Velθina /(34) acilune ·
turune · śc/(35)une · zea. zuc/(36)i · enesci · aθ/(37)umicś ·
Afu/(38)naś · penθn/(39)a · ama · Velθ/(40)ina · Afun(a) /(41)
θuruni · ein /(42) zeriuna · cl/(43)a · θil · θunχ/(44)ulθl ·
iχ · ca /(45) ceχa · ziχuχ/(46)e

=== Tentative translation ===
Following van der Meer, as above:

May Velthina order
through our declaration (?) that as to the grotto, the sacred objects
shall stay in the grotto at his disposal(?). And the same Velthuna shall do,
give, and make good the right (things), through our declaration(?).
The cippus (penthna) will be (the property) of the noble (athumicś) Afuna. Velthina will not prosecute (ein zeriuna) Athuna through (judicial) authority (thurune?). This is the accord concerning the water (rights),
as it is written above.

=== Notes on text ===
The last word in the text, ziχuχe means "was written".

In line 10, θi-i and θi-l are respectively dative/instrumental and genitive for "water," and according to Facchetti (and approved by Wylin) the form cenu means "(is) obtained." Wylin translates the phrase (9-11) Aulesi Velθinas Arznal clensi/ θii θil ścuna cenu e/pl-c feli-c Larθal-ś Afun-e as "'With respect to the water of Aule Velthina, son of Arznei, the use (ścuna) of water is obtained bothepl and feli by Larth Afuna." And Wylin points out that the tricolon in lines 33-34 acilune. turune. ścune probably corresponds to the Latin legal phrase facere, dare, praestare "to do, to give, and to make good," a phrase used with respect to personal obligations rather than legal rights."

Some phrases identified and partly translated by van Heems include: (1-2) eurat tanna larezul ame --"Larezul is the arbitrator tanna (of what follows?)"; (2-3) vaχr lautn Velθinaś eśtla Afunas slel eθ caru -- "An agreement of the Velthina tribe with that of Afuna, by his own (accord) was concluded (car-u ?)"; (3-5) tezan fuśle-ri tesnś-teiś raśneś -- "Complying (tezan ?) to the ordinances (fuśle-ri ?) from the public/Etruscan law"; (5-7) ipa ama hen naper XII Velθina-θur-aś araś peraś-c -- "that 12 hen (arable?) acres of Velthinas shall be dedicated and pera -ed." (18-21) inte mamer cnl Velθina zia śatene tesne, eca Velθina θuraś θaura helu --"To the (tomb) which Velthina zi-ed on the mamer according to the satena law, this has been hel -ed as the tomb of Velthina". In lines 29–30, the form fulumχva mirrors pulumχva in the Pyrgi Tablets and (in the singular?) pulum in the inscription on the Golini Tomb. (36-46)aθumicś Afunaś. penθna. ama. Velθina. Afuna θuruni. ein zeriuna. cla. θil. θunχulθl. iχ. ca ceχa. ziχuχe -- "The cippus of Afuna is aθumicś. Velthina (and) Afuna together (θuruni ?) shall not zerina (violate?) the accord concernting the water (rights), as this is written above."
