= Zecharia Mayani =

French writer (1899–1982)

Zacharie Mayani (birth name Zecharia Solomonovich Klyuchevich, 1899, Melitopol, Russian Empire (currently Ukraine) – 1982, Eilat, Israel) was a French writer and author of Russian Jewish descent.

== Education and publications ==
He was educated at Paris University, where he received his doctorate in 1935. He was also a student in the École du Louvre. Pedagogue, journalist, specialist in antiquities, also author of a Hebrew textbook for Russian speakers and activist of the Zionist revisionist movement.

His book Les Etrusques commencent a parler (The Etruscans Begin to Speak) put forth a thesis with exuberant reconstructions that the Etruscan language of antiquity had links to the modern Albanian language. This connection is dismissed by most scholars as "wildly speculative". Comparative linguistics have long demonstrated that Albanian is a unique branch of the Indo-European languages, whereas the consensus among linguists and etruscologists is that Etruscan was a pre–Indo-European language.

In Les Hyksos et le monde de la Bible (Paris: Payot, 1956) he also emphasized a connection between the Hebrews, the Kenites and the Habiru. Zachari also supported that Canaanites went into Asia Minor, Illyria, and even Italy.

== Bibliography ==
- L'arbre sacré et le rite de l'alliance chez les anciens sémites (1935)
- Les Hyksos et le monde de la Bible (1956)
- Les Etrusques commencent a parler, Collection Signes des Temps XI (1961)
