= William John Law =

William John Law (1786–1869) was a British judge of the 19th century.

== Biography ==
Law was born on 6 December 1786. His father, Ewan Law, second son of Edmund Law, Bishop of Carlisle, was Member of Parliament for Westbury, Wiltshire, 1790–5, for Newtown, Isle of Wight, 5 May to 29 June 1802, and died at Horsted, Sussex, 29 April 1829, having married, 28 June 1784, Henrietta Sarah, eldest daughter of Dr. William Markham, Archbishop of York; she died on 15 August 1844, aged 80.

The eldest son, William John, was educated at Westminster School, and matriculated, 16 May 1804, from Christ Church, Oxford, where he held a studentship until 1814. He took a university prize for Latin verse in 1807, a first class in the following year, graduated B.A. 1808, and proceeded M.A. 1810. On 11 February 1813 he was called to the bar at Lincoln's Inn, and on the passing of Lord Eldon's Act in 1825 became one of the commissioners of bankruptcy. Subsequently, he was appointed a commissioner of the court for the relief of insolvent debtors and on 1 August 1853 was promoted to be the chief commissioner. This court was abolished in 1861.

He was a hard-working and intelligent lawyer, possessed of a thorough practical mastery of the branch of justice which he administered for so many years. Though he was not a betting man, he knew the 'Racing Calendar' by heart, and never missed seeing The Derby. His fondness for the classics never declined. Between 1854 and 1856 he was engaged in controversy with Robert Ellis (1820?–1885), whose views respecting Hannibal's route over the Alps he sharply attacked in three pamphlets (1855–6). In 1866 he published a voluminous treatise, in 2 vols., On the Passage of Hannibal over the Alps, which had formed his employment in his intervals from business during many years.

He lived at 2 Upper Brook Street, Mayfair from 1831 to 1835. He died at 5 Sussex Square, Brighton, 5 October 1869, having married, 1 January 1817, Charlotte Elizabeth, daughter of Robert Simpson of Middlethorpe Hall, Yorkshire.

== Publications ==
His works include:

1. Reports of Cases in the Court for Relief of Insolvent Debtors, by H. R. Reynolds and W. J. Law, 1830.
2. Comments on the New Scheme of Insolvency, with Remarks on the Law of Certificate in Bankruptcy, 1843.
3. Some Remarks on the Alpine Passes of Strabo, 1846.
4. History of a Court-Martial held 1848 on Lieutenant E. Plowden. Sentence Reversed in 1854, 1854.
5. Remarks on the right of Personal Protection acquired through Bankruptcy and the Contempt of it by certain County Courts, 1855.
6. A Letter to E. Cooke, Esq., on Illegal Commitments made by some Judges of County Courts, 1856.
7. Comments on the Bankruptcy and Liquidation Act, 1858, 1859.
8. Remarks on the Bankruptcy Act, 1861, 1862.
