= Tabula Cortonensis =

Third most extensive etruscan text

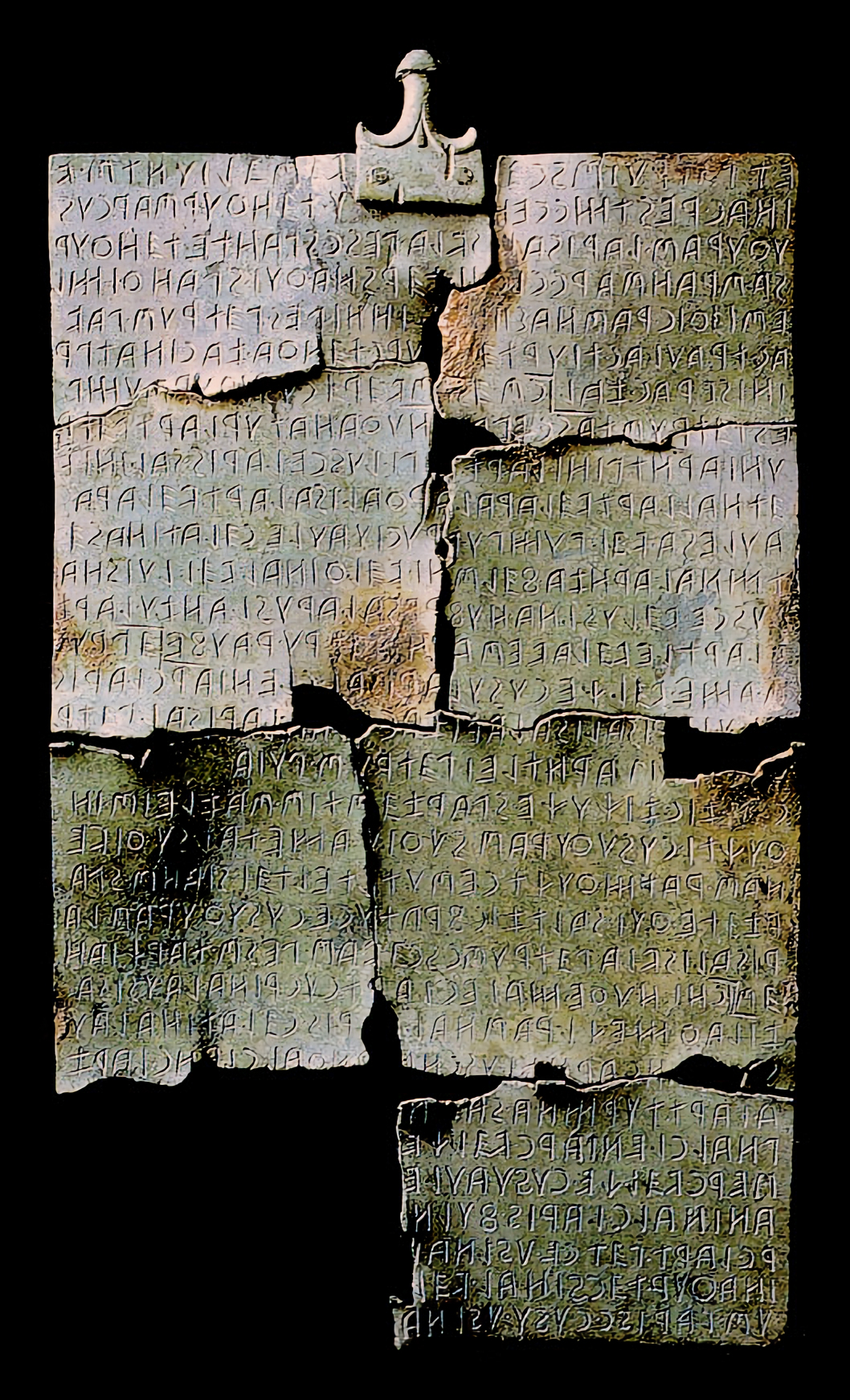
- Front view
- Material: bronze
- Height: 458 mm
- Width: 285 mm
- Writing: Etruscan
- Created: 2nd century BC
- Discovered: October 1992; Cortona
- Present location: MAEC, Cortona

The Tabula Cortonensis (sometimes also Cortona Tablet) is a 2200-year-old, inscribed bronze tablet in the Etruscan language, discovered in Cortona, Italy. It may record for posterity the details of an ancient legal transaction which took place in the ancient Tuscan city of Cortona, known to the Etruscans as Curtun. Its 40-line, 200-word, two-sided inscription is the third longest inscription found in the Etruscan language, after the Liber Linteus Zagrabiensis and the Tabula Capuana, and the longest discovered in the 20th century.

== Provenance ==
The tablet was brought to the police in October 1992 by someone who claimed to have found it at a construction site in September 1992. When provided to the police, the tablet had been broken into seven fragments, with the original right bottom corner missing. Investigators attempted to find the missing portion and confirm the existence of the site. It was subsequently recognized that the tablet was broken in antiquity, so the missing portion may have been separated centuries ago. It was also determined that the "discoverer" of the tablet had lied about where he found it, and he was put on trial for mishandling of artifacts, but was found innocent. Local researchers believe that the tablet had actually been found on a different construction site and was deliberately concealed so that construction could be completed on time without being delayed by archaeological work. The real origin of the tablet is unknown to this day.

== Interpretation ==
The tablet is thought by some scholars, notably Larissa Bonfante and Nancy de Grummond, to be a notarized record of the division of an inheritance or sale of real estate. Reference is made on the tablet to a vineyard (cf. lines 1 and 2: vinac), cultivated land (line 2: restm-c), and an estate located in the territory of Lake Trasimeno (cf. lines 35 and 36: celti nɜitisś tarsminaśś). The lake lies east of Cortona in modern-day Western Umbria.

The legal document centered around the aristocratic Cusu family and Petru Scevas and his wife. Two groups of witnesses or listeners helped to certify the document, along with Larth Cucrina Lausisa, zilath mechl rasnal (‘a chief magistrate of the territory of Cortona’). The document ends officially dating itself according to the two magistrates in office that year.

Wallace points out that "we know that, in third- and second-century Tuscany, redistribution of land took place in which large plots were parceled up into smaller chunks to be worked by individual families. It is possible, then, that [the Tabula Cortonensis] may well be concerned with just such an allocation of land..."

Additionally, several words (pav, clθii, zilci, atina, larz) that appear on the tablet have been found inscribed on Etruscan plates, drinking cups, or wine jugs or jars.

== Physical description ==
The tablet measures just over 8 inches wide by about 11 inches long, and is about between 2 millimetres (0.079 in) and 3 millimetres (0.12 in) thick.

When discovered, the tablet had been broken into multiple pieces, of which only seven have been found. The missing portion is believed by Etruscanists to contain only names and not details of the estate.

== Text ==
The text contains thirty-four known Etruscan words and an equal number of previously unattested Etruscan words. Moreover, a new alphabetic sign Ǝ (a reversed epsilon) is present on the tablet. This implies that, at least in the Etruscan dialect spoken in Cortona where this letter exclusively appears, the letter Ǝ marks a different sound from that of the letter E. The inscription is datable to the late 3rd to early 2nd century bce, so near 200.

=== Contents ===
The following transcribes the special reversed epsilon as ɜ. There are clear zigzag marks in the text (marked here by \\) that presumably end sentences or sections, and each such section will be treated separately here:

On the front

=== First section ===
01: et . pɜtruiś . scɜvɜś . ɜliuntś . v
02: inac . restmc . cenu . tɜnθur . śar . cus
03: uθuraś . larisalisvla . pesc . spante . tɜnθur .
04: sa . śran . śarc . clθii . tɜrsna . θui . spanθi . ml
05: ɜśieθic . raśna s IIIIC inni . pes . pɜtruś . pav
06: ac . traulac . tiur . tɜn[θ]urs . tɜnθa[ś] . za cina t pr
07: iniserac . zal \\

Notes: The forms pɜtruiś (1)/pɜtruś (5) (and other forms throughout the text) are probably forms of a name, compare Latin Petronius. As noted above, vina-c and restm-c(2) probably indicate "vineyard" and "cultivated land" (or "garden"?) respectively, the final -c meaning "and."

If ɜliuntś(1) can be connected to Etr. eleivana "of oil" from the Greek *elaiwa > élaion "(olive) oil", we may be dealing with an olive orchard, a vineyard and a cultivated field or garden presumably belonging to Petronius Scaevus (compare Gaius Mucius Scaevola "lefty," legendary Roman hero who held his right hand over his captors' fire until it was burnt off, to show how much he loved Rome). Rex Wallace considers ɜliuntś to be a title of pɜtruiś . scɜvɜś, since all three agree in case marking.

Facchetti (2000) (and Wylin) has proposed that cenu is a passive verb, also found in the Cippus Perusinus, that means "is obtained"; though Maggiani (2002) takes it to mean "is ceded."

The word spante(3) elsewhere seems to refer to a kind of bowl or plate (cf ETP 289) (versus sparza (18, 36) “tablet.”) But it is possible that here it and spanθi (4) are locatives of span "plain."

śar(-c) (2,4) is "ten" and zal is "two" (7), and the "Roman" numeral 'IIIIC'(5) had been sometimes interpreted as "400," though Etruscans generally had a different sign for "100" than C, at least early on. More recent analyses read it as SIIIIC (re-segmenting the s from raśna-s) as "14.5."

Notable is raśna(s) (5) (and in line 24 raśna-l), perhaps a form of the endonym for the Etruscan people (but also claimed to be just the generic term for "people, public"), here perhaps indicating that Etruscan measurements are being used (see Wylin's translation below). cusuθuraś and larisalisvla (3), seen in various forms throughout the text and beyond, also seem to be names.

In lines 5-6, the coordinated elements pava-c traula-c seem to show up in slightly altered form in the Liber Linteus (4.21-22) eisna . pevach . vinum . trau . pruchś, which van der Meer translates "a ritual (eis-na) young? (peva-ch) (> a new(?) ritual): wine, a pouring (trau) from the (wine-)jug (pruch-ś)," pointing out that peva/pava probably means "boy, youth", but also admitting that trau may be an agent noun, like zichu "writer." C. De Simone translates traula- here as "he who libates," and he connects zacinat with the functions of a priest.

Wylin proposes a translation of the whole section, building on Facchetti and Maggiani (loc. cit.):

(1) So by Petru Scevas, the êliun (olive grove? or title of Petru?), (2) a vineyard and a restm (garden?) of 10 tenthur are obtained from the

Cushu, (3) and (also) a farm (pes-c) in the plain (span-te), of 4 tenthur and (4) 10 śran [is obtained] from these same [folks];
the entire property (tɜrsna) here (θui), in the plain and in the mlesia (5) (costs) 14.5 rasna.

With respect to the farm for Petru, (6,7) the zacinat prinisherac has a month (tiur) to size up the two measures,

[these are] the pava and the traula."

("fundus" in the original was replaced by the English "farm" here.)

In this analysis, a tenthur is a unit of land measure that is more than ten times larger than a śran; perhaps comparable to the Latin jugerum (.623 acre = 27,200 sq.ft.) versus an actus simplex.
In line 4, tɜrsna, translated here "property", may be related in some way to Latin terra < *tersa
Also in line 4, mlesia contrasts with span- "plane" so must mean "surrounding hills," a conclusion supported by the fact that this seems to be where the orchard and (perhaps) the vineyards were.

More recently, van der Meer, following Maggiani's 2002 analysis, has reversed the transaction so that the land is being ceded by Petru to the Cusu family:

Petru Scevas the olive merchant hereby has ceded 10 tenthur (probably amounting to about 2.5 hectares) of both vineyard and garden to the Cusu (family), as well as 410 tenthur of farmland in the valley. (Outside) of these (lands) which (have just been specified) in this (agreement), the lands in the plain and on the hill (shall be) public (lands), (being worth) 204.5 units of silver.

As to the farmland of Petru, let both the haruspex and the libation pourer be present in the (appropriate) month (to perform their rites), and let the measurer and the two bearers of oak poles (?prinisera) measure the acreage.

=== Second section ===
07 (continued) cś . ɜsiś vere cusuθurśum .
08: pes . pɜtruśta . scɜv[aś] \\

Notes: The first part is obscure, while the rest repeats names treated above. pes (8) also repeats pes(c) (3,5) from the first section. If Wylin's conclusion is correct that pes = "farm, fundus ", perhaps then it is related to Umbrian peř-ae "(on the) ground"?

Van der Meer offers: "By (the power?) of this sacred action, this (land) of Petru Scevas (is) thus the Cusu family's land."

=== Third section ===
08 (continued) nu θanatur . lart pɜtr
09: uni . arnt . pini . lart . [v]ipi . lusce . laris
10: vɜtnal . lart . vɜlara . larθal'isa . lart vɜlara.
11: aulesa . vɜl . pumpu . pruciu . aule cɜlatina . sɜ
12: tmnal . arnza . fɜlśni . vɜlθinal . vɜl . luisna
13: lusce . vɜl uslna . nufresa . laru . slanzu . larz
14: a lartle vɜlaveś arnt . pɜtru . raufe \\

Notes: In line 8, nuθanatur (8) apparently means “a group of witnesses,” from nuθe “observes” and the suffix ‐θur/‐tur which forms nouns indicating membership.

Much of the rest of this section seems to be a list of names of witnesses to the contract: lart/laris/larz..., pɜtruni, pumpu (cf Oscan pump- "5" in Romanized names Pompeius, etc). The last word is probably related to Latin Rufus (itself of dialect origin, the native Latin cognate being ruber 'red') and Umbrian rofu also "red" (presumably describing his hair), perhaps to distinguish this "Red Petronius" from "Lefty Petronius" (unless it is a form of Etruscan ruva "brother"). Variants of this form from other inscriptions include rauhe and ruvfe.

In line 11, with regard to aulesa . vɜl, it may be noted that there is a statue also from Cortona (first century BCE) of a man described in Etruscan as aulesi vel... interpreted as "Aule, son of Vel..." a name also seen here in lines 24, 26, and 39.

Also in line 11, atina may mean "maternal" from ati "mother," just as apana "paternal" < apa "father." As it is also written alone on a cup (ETP 136). But atina may also be a name, or theonym. A variant (?) atana is found on another drinking cup (kylix) at ETP 212. The phrase cel atina recurs at the end of the inscription, as well, and may be a particular place, or a theonym "Mother Earth."

Van der Meer offers: "The witnesses (are)": (list of 15 male names)

=== Fourth section ===
14 (continued) ɜpru
15: ś . ame . vɜlχe . cusu larisal . cleniarc . laris
16: cusu . larisalisa larizac clan . larisal . pɜtr
17: uni . scɜ[va]ś arntlei . pɜtruś . puia
18: cen . zic . ziχuχe . sparzɜśtiś śazleiś in
19: θuχti . cusuθuraś . suθiu . ame . tal suθive
20: naś . ratm . θuχt . ceśu . tltel tɜi . sianś .
21: sparzɜte . θui . sal t zic . fratuce . cusuθuraś .
22: larisalisvla . pɜtruśc . scɜvaś . pesś . tarχia
23: eś

Notes: Again, mostly names here, many of which also appear on various other (especially the thousands of funereal) inscriptions, but also kinship terms: cleniar-c(15) "and sons", clan(16) "son", puia(17) "wife". In lines 15 and 19, ame is a form of the copula verb am- "to be".

In line 18, the phrase cen . zic . ziχuχe probably means "this document (zic) was written". The next word, sparzɜ(18), seems to mean “tablet” (sparza), possibly in the locative here.

18 -19 cen . zic . ziχuχe . sparzɜśtiś śazleiś in / θuχti . cusuθuraś . suθiu . ame according to H. Becker (following Facchetti 2005: 62; Maggiani 2001: 107; Wallace 2008: 213) means: "This text which was written on a tablet sazle (perhaps meaning made of bronze or wood) was placed in the house (θuχti) of the Cusu family." But Wylin proposes: "This text has been transcribed from the original (śazleiś) tablet, which...."; a translation supported by the fact that the phrase sparzɜśtiś śazleiś is inflected with not only the locative -(t)i but also the ablative -s.

The following phrase in 19 - 20 tal suθive / naś . rat-m . θuχt . ceśu according again to Becker, may mean "of that(?) having been done the deposit according to the rite (rat-)(?) in the house (θuχt) it stays" or "when that has been done, the deposit remains in the house as is the custom" As Becker points out, it is significant and interesting that this clearly public regal document is to reside in the presumably private residence.

According to C. De Simone, suθiu in line 19 means "funerary ceremony" and θuχt in 20 may refer to a feast in honor of the dead in "August."

Wylin interprets the phrase θuχt . ceśu . tltel tɜi (20) as "deposited in the house, in that of that one (referring topɜtruś)" thus seeing it as parallel to the earlier phrase: θuχti . cusuθuraś . suθiu . ame(19).

In line 20, the form fratu-ce has a past tense verbal ending -ce, but it otherwise looks like the Umbrian and Latin word for "brother" frater in Umbrian context meaning a member of a holy order; so if the root was borrowed from Umbrian, this may mean something like "consulted together as brethren."

Wylin proposes for the sequence sianś ./ sparzɜte . θui . salt zic . fratuce . cusuθuraś . / larisalisvla . pɜtruśc . scɜvaś . pesś . tarχian/eś \\(20-23) the translation: "The sian ("wise one"? if related to Latin sanus) incised (fratu-ce) the text (zic) here (θui) on the tablet (sparzɜte) with the agreement (sal-t) of C.L. and of P.S. from the field of Tarchian."

The pesś (farm?) of pɜtruśc . scɜvaś is mentioned again in line 22, followed by tarχian /eś which looks like a form of Tarchna, Tarquinia a town name and family name.

Van der Meer offers: "(The names) of the participants are: (list of names). This text has been copied from this bronze tablet, which (copied) text has been placed in the house of Cusuthur. The master of the house (literally 'father') has ratified this text as incised here on the tablet for the Cusu (family), sons of Laris, and for Petru Scevas from the Tarchianan estate."

=== Fifth section ===
23 (continued) cnl . nuθe . malec . lart . cucrina lausisa .
24: zilaθ meχl .raśnal .[la]ris . cɜlatina lau
25: sa clanc . arnt luscni [a]rnθal . clanc . larz
26: a . lart . turmna . salin[ial . larθ cɜlatina .
27: apnal . cleniarc . vɜlχe[ś][...][papal]
28: śerc . vɜlχe . cusu . aule[sa][...]
29: aninalc . laris . fuln[folnius][clenia]
30: rc . lart . pɜtce . uslnal[...][cucrina]
31 cucrinaθur . tɜcsinal . vɜl[...]

Notes: In line 23, male- according to R. Wallace means "oversee," related to malena "mirror."

In line 25, we see the well attested word for "son" clan-c twice, and in 27 (and probably at 29-30) the plural cleniar-c "sons" also appears. Another kinship term, papal "grandson", occurs in the partly damaged line 27.

zilath (24) is a well established Etruscan word meaning 'one who governs' from the verb zil 'to rule', thought to be equivalent of a Latin praetor in function. The full phrase zilaθ meχl.raśnal probably means "magistrate of the res publica."

A form somewhat similar to fuln[folnius] (29) can be found in the Tabula Capuana: ful/inus'nes (5/6). B. van der Meer thinks that it is a name of a god in the Tabula Capuana (= Fufluns?).

The form uslnal in 30 and 32 is similar to uslane- in Liber Linteus (5.21) (with expected loss of the internal vowel here), which van der Meer takes to be an adjectival form of usil "Sun (god), sun, noon, midday," though here it may be part of a name. The context of the Liber Linteus form is as follows (5.19-22): citz . vacl . nunθen . θesan . tinś . θesan / eiseraś . śeuś . unuχ . mlaχ . nunθen . θesviti / favitic . faśei . cisum . θesane . uslanec / mlaχe . luri . zeric roughly: "Three times (perform) a libation. Make an offering to θesan (Dawn) of Tin (Jupiter) (and) to θesan / of the Dark Gods (= morning and evening Venus?), for them, make an appropriate offering with oil both in the morning / and in the evening (?), (and) three times (make a libation?) in the morning and at noon / for the beautiful Lur and Zer."

Van der Meer offers: "Bearing witness to and observing these matters are: Lars Cucrina, praetor of the city, and (list 15 male persons)."

=== On the back ===
33: aule . salini . cusual
34: zilci . larθal . cusuś . titinal
35: lari salc . saliniś . aulesla . celtinɜitis
36: ś . tarsminaśś . sparza in θuχt ceśu .
37: ratm . suθiu . suθiusva . vɜlχeś . cusuśa
38: ulesla . vɜlθuruś . t[.]lniś . vɜlθurusla .
39: larθalc . cɜlatinaś apnal . larisalc .
40: cɜlatinaś . pitlnal

Notes: This section is mainly notable for seeming to identify the name of a known lake in line 36, tarsminaśś "Lake Trasimeno", leading some to conclude, as noted above, that what precedes must be the Etruscan word for "lake": nɜitisś (35/36) . The word celti that immediately precedes is the word for earth or land cel plus the locative -ti. The same root shows up in 39 and 40 in the phrase cɜl atinaś with the second element either being a name, or related to ati "mother" (in which case "Mother Earth"? or "land of/consecrated to the Mother"?). Or Celatina could be simply a name (see below).

On sparza (36) "tablet" and θuχt "house" see above in section four. Wylin takes the phrase in lines 36-37 sparza in θuχt ceśu . / ratm . suθiu . suθiusa to mean: "the tablet that has been deposited (cesu) in this house has also (rat-m?) been deposited (suθiu[s]) in the residences (suθiu-sva) of..." followed by the names of four people.

The phrase zilci . larθal . cusuś / titinal. larisalc . saliniś . aulesla (34-35) probably means "In the Zilc-ship of Lart Cusu, (son) of Titina, and of Laris Salini, (son) of Aule."

In full, this section roughly reads: "Aule Salini of the Cusu (family) (agreed to this) in the magistracy of Lart Cusu, (son) of Titina, and of Laris Salini, (son) of Aule in the land of Lake Trasimeno. (Copies of) the tablet lying in (this) house, according to custom, are deposited, as things to be placed (also in the houses) of: Velche Cusu, son of Aule; Velthur Titlni, son of Velthur; Lart Celatina, son of Apnei; and Laris Celatina, son of Pitlnei.
