= Mario Alinei =

Italian linguist (1926–2018)

Mario Alinei (10 August 1926 – 9 August 2018) was an Italian linguist and professor emeritus at the University of Utrecht, where he taught from 1959 to 1987. He was founder and editor of Quaderni di semantica, a journal of theoretical and applied semantics. Until 1997, he was president of Atlas Linguarum Europae at UNESCO.

== Biography ==
Alinei was born in Turin, Italy in August 1926. He authored hundreds of publications and was a prominent scholar in the field of dialectology. Alinei was a pioneer in the use of computers in linguistics. According to Pavle Ivić, "Alinei is one of the not so numerous European linguists who already in the early sixties were willing and able to apply the results of technological innovations to the study of language."

After his retirement, beginning in 1996, Alinei also became known as a proponent of the Paleolithic continuity theory that Indo-European languages originated in Europe during the Upper Paleolithic. He died in Impruneta, Italy in August 2018, two days shy of his 92nd birthday.

In the book Etruscan: An Archaic Form of Hungarian, Alinei proposes, in accordance with the Paleolithic continuity theory, to identify Etruscan as an archaic phase of the current Hungarian language and proposes a reading of various Etruscan texts in this sense. The conclusions of Alinei's book were not accepted by the scientific community: the book was described by the Magyar Angela Marcantonio as a case of 'fantasy-linguistics', and Alinei's hypothesis "to be rejected without delay and without reservations". Alinei was also severely criticized by the linguist Danilo Gheno, professor of Finno-Ugric Philology and substitute teacher of Hungarian Language and Literature, and by numerous Hungarian linguists.

In the following book, Gli Etruschi erano Turchi Alinei, on the basis of presumed and unproven genetic, cultural and linguistic affinities, modified this thesis and identified the Turks as the ancestors of the Etruscans; a thesis that would be confirmed, according to Alinei, also by the Latin ethnonym Tuscus < *Tur-s-cu-s, Umbrian Turskum. He also explains that the Etruscan-Hungarian affinities are also real, but are due to the massive presence of Turkisms in Hungarian, caused by the invasion of prehistoric South-Eastern Europe by the Turco-Altaics, the first domesticators of the horse. Alinei's thesis, once again, is completely rejected by the scientific community on a genetic, cultural and linguistic level.

=== Timeline ===
- Since 1980: General Editor of the journal "Quaderni di Semantica".
- 1970–1997: Co-founder, Vice-President and President (from 1982) of the Atlas Linguarum Europae, a UNESCO sponsored project.
- 1968–1987: Full Professor of Italian Linguistics and Literature, University of Utrecht (NL).
- 1962–1968: Associate Professor of Italian Linguistics and Literature, University of Utrecht (NL).
- 1959–1962: Assistant Professor of Italian Linguistics and Literature, University of Utrecht (NL).
- Consultant of Olivetti for advanced research on computational linguistics
- Consultant of IBM for advanced research on computational linguistics

== Fellowships ==
- Since 1996: honorary member of the International Society for Dialectology and Geolinguistics
- 1989–1996: President of the International Society for Dialectology and Geolinguistics
- 1989: President of the Societas Linguistica Europaea.
- 1979–1980: Research Fellowship of the Netherlands Institute for Advanced Studies.
- Since 1996: senior member of the Royal Academy Gustaf Adolf, Uppsala (Sweden).
- Ordinary member of the Royal Academy Gustaf Adolf, Uppsala (Sweden).
- Ordinary member of the Accademia Peloritana, Messina.
- Founding member of the Società Linguistica Italiana.
- Founding member of the Societé Internationale de Linguistique et Géolinguistique

== Bibliography ==
- Lingua e dialetti: Struttura, storia e geografia (Studi linguistici e semiologici)
- Dal totemismo al cristianesimo popolare: Sviluppi semantici nei dialetti italiani ed europei (Filologia, linguistica, semiologia)
- Alinei, Mario (1991), L'approccio semantico e storico-culturale: verso un nuovo orizzonte cronologico per la formazione dei dialetti, in Atti del Colloquio "I dialetti e la dialettologia negli anni Novanta" (Lecce: 9-11/5/1991), "Rivista Italiana di Dialettologia", 15, pp 43–65.
- Alinei, Mario (1992), Dialectologie, anthropologie culturelle, archéologie: vers un nouvel horizon chronologique pour la formation des dialectes européens, in AA.VV., Nazioarteko dialektologia biltzarra. Agirak. Actas del Congreso International de Dialectologia Euskaltzaindia (Bilbo: 21–25 October 1991), Bilbo, Bonaparte, 1992, pp. 577–606.
- Alinei, Mario (1996–2000), Origini delle lingue d'Europa, vol. I - La teoria della continuità. Vol. II: Continuità dal Mesolitico all'età del Ferro nelle principali aree etnolinguistiche. 2 voll., Bologna, Il Mulino.
- Alinei Mario (1997a); L'aspect magico-religieux dans la zoonymie populaire, in Publications de la faculté des lettres, arts, et sciences humaines de Nice, Les zoonymes, Nouvelle série, n. 38.
- Alinei Mario (1997b); Magico-religious motivations in European dialects: a contribution to archaeolinguistics, "Dialectologia et Geolinguistica" 5, pp. 3–30.
- Alinei, Mario (1997c), L'etude historique des etrês imaginaires des Alpes dans le cadre de la theorie de la continuité, in AA.VV., Actes de la Conference Annuelle sur l'activité scientifique du Centre d'Etude Francoprovencales. Les Etres imaginaires dans les recits des Alpes, Aosta, 1996, pp. 103–110.
- Alinei Mario (1997d), La teoria della continuità ed alcuni esempi di lunga durata nel lessico dialettale neolatino, in «Rivista Italiana di dialettologia», 21, pp. 73–96.
- Alinei, Mario (1998a), Towards an invasionless model of Indo-European origins: the continuity theory, in M. Pearce and M. Tosi (eds.), Papers from the EEA Third Annual Meeting at Ravenna 1997. Vol. I: Pre-and Protohistory, pp. 31–33.
- Alinei, Mario (1998b), Il problema dell'etnogenesi ladina alla luce della "teoria della continuità", in Mondo Ladino. "Atti del Convegno I Ladins dles Dolomites". Convegno Interdisciplinare (Vigo di Fassa, 11-14/9/1996), XXII, pp. 459–487.
- Alinei, Mario (1998c), Nuove prospettive nella ricerca storico-semantica ed etimologica, in "Quaderni di Semantica" 19,2, Atti del XXX Congresso SLI Budapest, Bulzoni, pp. 199–212.
- Alinei, Mario (2000a), Origini delle lingue d'Europa. Vol. II: Continuità dal Mesolitico al Ferro nelle principali aree europee, Bologna, Il Mulino.
- Alinei, Mario (2000b), An alternative model for the origins of European peoples and languages: the continuity theory, "Quaderni di Semantica" 21, pp. 21–50.
- Alinei, Mario (2000c), L'etnogenesi Ladina alla luce delle nuove teorie sulle origini dei popoli indoeuropei, in Atti del Convegno "Ad Gredine forestum: Il costituirsi di una vallata" (Ortisei: 23-25/9/1999), pp. 23–64.
- Alinei, Mario (2001a), European dialects: a window on the prehistory of Europe, "Lingua e Stile" 36, pp. 219–240.
- Alinei, Mario (2001b), Confini archeologici, confini dialettali: verso una dialettologia interdisciplinare, in G. Marcato (ed.), I confini del dialetto, Atti del Convegno (Sappada/Plodn/Belluno: 5-9/7/2000), Padova, Unipress, pp. 75–94.
- Alinei, Mario (2001c), Conseguenze delle nuove teorie indoeuropeistiche sulla dialettologia romanza, in Badia i Margarit (ed.), "Estudis Romànics", 23, pp. 7–47.
- Alinei, Mario (2001d), Nuove prospettive nella ricerca storico-semantica ed etimologica, in Società di Linguistica Italiana SLI 42, Semantica e Lessicologia Storiche. Atti del XXXII Congresso, Bulzoni, pp. 25–46.
- Alinei, Mario (2002), Towards a Generalized Continuity Model for Uralic and Indoeuropean Languages, in K. Julku (ed.), The Roots of Peoples and Languages of Northern Eurasia IV (Oulu: 18-20/8/2000), Oulu, Societas Historiae Fenno-Ugricae, pp. 9–33.
- Alinei, Mario (2003), Etrusco: una forma arcaica di ungherese, Bologna, Il Mulino.
- Alinei, Mario (2003b), Interdisciplinary and linguistic evidence for Palaeolithic continuity of Indo-European, Uralic and Altaic populations in Eurasia, in "Quaderni di Semantica" 24,2.
- Alinei, Mario (fc.a), Continuity from Paleolithic of Indo-European and Uralic populations in Europe: the convergence of linguistic and archaeological frontiers, in Proceedings of the XIVth Congress of the UISPP (Liège: 2-8/9/2001), BAR International Series.
- Alinei, Mario (fc.b), Interdisciplinary and linguistic evidence for Palaeolithic continuity of Indo-European, Uralic and Altaic populations in Eurasia, with an excursus on Slavic ethnogenesis, in Proceedings of Kobarid conference (2003).
- Gli Etruschi erano Turchi. Dalla scoperta delle affinità genetiche alle conferme linguistiche e culturali, Alessandria, Edizioni dell'Orso, 2013.
- Alinei, Mario (2015), Dante rivoluzionario borghese. Per una lettura storica della Commedia, Velletri, PM edizioni.

== Sources ==
- Nils, A. Hagen, Terho Itkonen, Pavle Ivić, Mieczyslaw Szymczak Århammer (1986), Aspects of Language: Studies in Honour of Mario Alinei
- Aspects of Language: Studies in Honour of Mario Alinei, vol II: Theoretical and Applied Semantics. Papers Presented to Mario Alinei by his Friends... on the Occasion of his 60th Birthday.
