= Tyrsenian languages =

Extinct pre-Indo-European language family

Tyrsenian
- Tyrrhenian
- Geographic distribution: Italian Peninsula, Eastern Alps, Corsica, Lemnos
- Extinct: 1st century AD (Etruscan)
- Linguistic classification: One of the world's primary language families
- Subdivisions: Etruscan; Raetic; Lemnian (possibly a daughter language or dialect of Etruscan; uncertain); ?Camunic

Language codes
- Glottolog: None
- Approximate area of Tyrsenian languages

Tyrsenian (also Tyrrhenian or Common Tyrrhenic) is a language family of closely related extinct ancient languages, proposed by linguist Helmut Rix in 1998, that has gained acceptance in scholarship. It is named after the Tyrrhenians (Ancient Greek, Ionic: Τυρσηνοί Tyrsenoi), an exonym used by the ancient Greeks to refer to the Etruscans.

The family would consist of the Etruscan language of northern, central and south-western Italy, and eastern Corsica; the Raetic language of the Alps, in northern Italy and Austria, named after the Rhaetian people; and the Lemnian language attested in Lemnos in the northern Aegean Sea. Camunic in northern Lombardy, between Etruscan and Raetic, may belong to the family as well, but evidence of such is limited. The Tyrsenian languages are Pre-Indo-European languages, and more specifically Paleo-European.

== Classification ==
Tyrrhenian language family tree as proposed by de Simone and Marchesini (2013)

In 1998 the German linguist Helmut Rix proposed that three then unclassified ancient languages belonged to a common linguistic family he called Tyrrhenian: the Etruscan language spoken in Etruria, the Raetic language of the Eastern Alps, and the Lemnian language, only attested by a small number of inscriptions from the Greek island of Lemnos in the Aegean Sea.

Rix's Tyrsenian family is supported by a number of linguists such as Stefan Schumacher, Carlo De Simone, Norbert Oettinger, Simona Marchesini, and Rex E. Wallace. Common features among Etruscan, Raetic, Lemnian have been found in morphology, phonology, and syntax. On the other hand, few lexical correspondences are documented, at least partly due to the scant number of Raetic and Lemnian texts and possibly also to the early date at which the languages split.

== History ==
=== Origin ===
Tyrsenian was probably a Paleo-European language family predating the arrival of Indo-European languages in Europe. Helmut Rix dated the end of the Proto-Tyrsenian period to the last quarter of the 2nd millennium BC. Carlo De Simone and Simona Marchesini have proposed a much earlier date, placing the Tyrsenian language split before the Bronze Age. This would provide one explanation for the low number of lexical correspondences.

In 2004, Van der Meer proposed that Raetic could have split from Etruscan from around 900 BC or even earlier, at any rate no later than 700 BC since divergences are already present in the oldest Etruscan and Raetic inscriptions, as is apparent in the grammatical voices of past tenses and in the endings of male gentilicia. From around 400 BC, the Rhaeti became isolated from the Etruscan area by the Cisalpine Celts, thus limiting contact between the two languages. Such a late date has garnered little consensus as the split would still be too recent to match the archaeological data, the Rhaeti in the second Iron Age being characterised by the Fritzens-Sanzeno culture, in continuity with late Bronze Age culture and early Iron Age Laugen-Melaun culture. The Raeti are not believed, archeologically, to descend from the Etruscans, any more than it is considered plausible that the Etruscans are descended from the Rhaeti, while the relationship between the Etruscan and Raetic languages is thought to date back to a remote stage of prehistory.

=== Extinction ===
The language group seems to have died out in Lemnos around the 6th century BC (by assimilation of the speakers to Greek), and as regards Etruscan around the 1st century AD in Italy (by assimilation to Latin). The latest Raetic inscriptions are dated to the 1st century BC (by assimilation to Latin).

=== Lemnian language ===
After more than 90 years of archaeological excavations at Lemnos, nothing has been found that would support a migration from Lemnos to Etruria or to the Alps where Raetic was spoken. The indigenous inhabitants of Lemnos, also called in ancient times Sinteis, were the Sintians, a Thracian population. The results of the previous excavations indicate that the Early Iron Age inhabitants of Lemnos could be a remnant of a Mycenaean population and, in addition, the earliest attested reference to Lemnos is the Mycenaean Greek ra-mi-ni-ja, "Lemnian woman", written in Linear B syllabic script. Scholars such as Norbert Oettinger, Michel Gras and Carlo De Simone think that Lemnian is the testimony of an Etruscan commercial settlement on the island that took place before 700 BC, not related to the Sea Peoples. Alternatively, the Lemnian language could have arrived in the Aegean Sea during the Late Bronze Age, when Mycenaean rulers recruited groups of mercenaries from Sicily, Sardinia and various parts of the Italian peninsula.

A 2021 archeogenetic analysis of Etruscan individuals, who lived between 800 BC and 1 BC, concluded that the Etruscans were autochthonous, and genetically similar to the Iron Age Latins, and that the Etruscan language, and therefore the other languages of the Tyrrhenian family, may be a surviving language of the ones that were widespread in Europe from at least the Neolithic period before the arrival of the Indo-European languages, as already argued by German geneticist Johannes Krause who concluded that it is likely that the Etruscan language (as well as Basque, Paleo-Sardinian and Minoan) "developed on the continent in the course of the Neolithic Revolution". The lack of recent Anatolian-related admixture and Iranian-related ancestry among the Etruscans, who are genetically related to the European cluster, might also suggest that the presence of a handful of inscriptions found at Lemnos, in a language related to Etruscan and Raetic, "could represent population movements departing from the Italian peninsula".

Strabo's (Geography V, 2) citation from Anticlides attributes a share in the foundation of Etruria to the Pelasgians of Lemnos and Imbros. The Pelasgians are also referred to by Herodotus as settlers in Lemnos, after they were expelled from Attica by the Athenians. Apollonius of Rhodes mentioned an ancient settlement of Tyrrhenians on Lemnos in his Argonautica (IV.1760), written in the third century BC, in an elaborate invented aition of Kalliste or Thera: in passing, he attributes the flight of Sintian Lemnians to the island Kalliste to "Tyrrhenian warriors" from the island of Lemnos.

== Languages ==
- Etruscan: 13,000 inscriptions, the overwhelming majority of which have been found in Italy; the oldest Etruscan inscription dates back to the 8th century BC, and the most recent one is dated to the 1st century AD.
- Raetic: 300 inscriptions, the overwhelming majority of which have been found in the Central Alps; the oldest Raetic inscription dates back to the 6th century BC.
- Lemnian: 2 inscriptions plus a small number of extremely fragmentary inscriptions; the oldest Lemnian inscription dates back to the late 6th century BC.
- Camunic: may be related to Raetic; about 170 inscriptions found in the Central Alps; the oldest Camunic inscription dates back to the 5th century BC.

== Evidence ==
Cognates common to Raetic and Etruscan are:

Etruscan	Raetic	Gloss
zal	zal	'two'
-(a)cvil	akvil	'gift'
zinace	t'inache	'he made'
-s	-s	-'s (genitive suffix)
-(i)a	-a	-'s (second genitive case suffix)
-ce	-ku	-ed (past active participle)

Cognates common to Etruscan and Lemnian are:

- shared dative-case suffixes *-si, and *-ale
  - attested as aule-si Etruscan 'to Aule' on the Cippus Perusinus inscriptions
  - attested as Hulaie-ši Lemnian 'for Hulaie', Φukiasi-ale 'for the Phocaean' on the Lemnos Stele
- a past tense suffix *-a-i
  - -⟨e⟩ as in ame 'was' ( ← *amai) in Etruscan
  - -⟨ai⟩ as in šivai 'lived' in Lemnian
- two cognate words describing ages
  - avils maχs śealχisc Etruscan 'and aged sixty-five'
  - aviš sialχviš Lemnian 'aged sixty'

== Fringe scholarship and superseded theories ==
=== Aegean language family ===
A larger Aegean family including Eteocretan, Minoan and Eteocypriot has been proposed by G. M. Facchetti referring to some alleged similarities between on the one hand Etruscan and Lemnian, and on the other hand languages like Minoan and Eteocretan. If these languages could be shown to be related to Etruscan and Raetic, they would constitute a pre-Indo-European language family stretching from (at the very least) the Aegean Islands and Crete across mainland Greece and the Italian Peninsula to the Alps. A proposed relation between these languages has also been made previously by Raymond A. Brown. Michael Ventris, who successfully deciphered Linear B with John Chadwick, also thought there to be a relation between Etruscan and Minoan. Facchetti proposes a hypothetical language family derived from Minoan in two branches. From Minoan he proposes a Proto-Tyrrhenian from which would have come the Etruscan, Lemnian and Raetic languages. James Mellaart has proposed that this language family is related to the pre-Indo-European languages of Anatolia, based upon place name analysis. From another Minoan branch would have come the Eteocretan language. T. B. Jones proposed in 1950 reading of Eteocypriot texts in Etruscan, which was refuted by most scholars but gained popularity in the former Soviet Union. In any case, a relationship between the Etruscan language and Minoan (including Eteocretan and Eteocypriot), and a larger Aegean family, is considered unfounded.

=== Anatolian languages ===
A relation with the Anatolian languages within Indo-European has been proposed, (Note: Steinbauer tries to relate both Etruscan and Raetic to Anatolian.) but is not accepted for historical, archaeological, genetic, and linguistic reasons. If these languages are an early Indo-European stratum rather than pre-Indo-European, they would be associated with Krahe's Old European hydronymy and would date back to a Kurganisation during the early Bronze Age.

=== Northeast Caucasian languages ===
A number of mainly Soviet or post-Soviet linguists, including Sergei Starostin, suggested a link between the Tyrrhenian languages and the Northeast Caucasian languages in an Alarodian language family, based on claimed sound correspondences between Etruscan, Hurrian, and Northeast Caucasian languages, numerals, grammatical structures and phonologies. Most linguists, however, either doubt that the language families are related, or believe that the evidence is far from conclusive.

== See also ==
- Camunic language (possibly related to Raetic)
- Old European hydronymy
- Pre-Indo-European languages
- Paleo-European languages

== Sources ==
- Barker, Graeme; Rasmussen, Tom (2000). The Etruscans. The Peoples of Europe. Oxford: Blackwell Publishing. ISBN 978-0-631-22038-1.
- Bellelli, Vincenzo; Benelli, Enrico (2018). Gli Etruschi. La scrittura. La lingua. La società [The Etruscans. Writing. The tongue. The society.] (in Italian). Rome: Carocci Editore. ISBN 978-88-430-9309-0.
- Brown, Raymond A. (1985). Evidence for pre-Greek speech on Crete from Greek alphabetic sources. Amsterdam: Adolf M. Hakkert.
- Chadwick, John (1967). The Decipherment of Linear B. Cambridge: Cambridge University Press. ISBN 978-0-521-39830-5.
- De Grummond, Nancy T. (2014). "Ethnicity and the Etruscans". In McInerney, Jeremy (ed.). A Companion to Ethnicity in the Ancient Mediterranean. Chichester, UK: John Wiley & Sons, Inc. pp. 405–422. doi:10.1002/9781118834312. ISBN 978-1-4443-3734-1.
- De Ligt, Luuk (2009). "An Eteocretan' inscription from Praisos and the homeland of the Sea Peoples" (PDF). Talanta. XL–XLI. Amsterdam: Dutch Archaeological and Historical Society: 151–172. Archived from the original (PDF) on 16 April 2025.
- de Simone, Carlo (1996). I Tirreni a Lemnos. Evidenza linguistica e tradizioni storiche [The Tyrrhenians in Lemnos. Linguistic evidence and historical traditions] (in Italian). Florence: Olschki.
- de Simone, Carlo (2011). "La Nuova Iscrizione 'Tirsenica' di Lemnos (Efestia, teatro): considerazioni generali" [Lemnos' New 'Tirsenic' Inscription (Hephaesty, theater): general considerations]. Rasenna: Journal of the Center for Etruscan Studies (in Italian). 3 (1). Amherst: Classics Department and the Center for Etruscan Studies at the University of Massachusetts Amherst: 1–34.
- de Simone, Carlo; Marchesini, Simona, eds. (2013). "La lamina di Demlfeld". Mediterranea. Quaderni annuali dell'Istituto di Studi sulle Civiltà italiche e del Mediterraneo antico del Consiglio Nazionale delle Ricerche (in Italian). Supplemento 8. Pisa/Roma. ISSN 1827-0506.
- Drews, Robert (1995). The End of the Bronze Age: Changes in Warfare and the Catastrophe of ca. 1200 B.C. Princeton, NJ: Princeton University Press. ISBN 978-0-691-04811-6.
- Facchetti, Giulio M. (2001). "Qualche osservazione sulla lingua minoica" [Some observations on the Minoican language]. Kadmos (in Italian). 40: 1–38. doi:10.1515/kadm.2001.40.1.1. S2CID 162250460.
- Facchetti, Giulio M. (2002). "Appendice sulla questione delle affinità genetiche dell'Etrusco" [Appendix on questions of the Etruscan genetic affinity]. Appunti di Morfologia Etrusca (in Italian). Leo S. Olschki: 111–150. ISBN 978-88-222-5138-1.
- Freeman, Philip (1999). "The Survival of the Etruscan Language". Etruscan Studies. 6 (1). doi:10.1515/etst.1999.6.1.75. ISSN 2163-8217.
- Ficuciello, Lucia (2013). Lemnos. Cultura, storia, archeologia, topografia di un'isola del nord-Egeo (in Italian). Athens: Scuola Archeologica Italiana di Atene. ISBN 978-960-9559-03-4.
- Haarmann, Harald (2014). "Ethnicity and Language in the Ancient Mediterranean". In McInerney, Jeremy (ed.). A Companion to Ethnicity in the Ancient Mediterranean. Chichester, UK: John Wiley & Sons, Inc. pp. 17–33. doi:10.1002/9781118834312.ch2. ISBN 978-1-4443-3734-1.
- Harding, Anthony H. (2014). "The later prehistory of Central and Northern Europe". In Renfrew, Colin; Bahn, Paul (eds.). The Cambridge World Prehistory. Vol. 3. Cambridge, UK: Cambridge University Press.
- Heffner, Edward H. (1927). "Archaeological News: Notes on Recent Archaeological Excavations and Discoveries; Other News July–December 1926". American Journal of Archaeology. 31 (1): 99–127 (123–124). doi:10.2307/497618. JSTOR 497618. S2CID 245265394.
- Krause, Johannes; Trappe, Thomas (2021). A Short History of Humanity: A New History of Old Europe. Translated by Waight, Caroline (I ed.). New York: Random House. p. 217. ISBN 978-0-593-22942-2.
- MacIntosh Turfa, Jean (2017). "The Etruscans". In Farney, Gary D.; Bradley, Gary (eds.). The Peoples of Ancient Italy. Berlin: De Gruyter. pp. 637–672. doi:10.1515/9781614513001. ISBN 978-1-61451-520-3.
- Marchesini, Simona (2009). Le lingue frammentarie dell'Italia antica: manuale per lo studio delle lingue preromane [The fragmentary languages of ancient Italy: manual for the study of pre-Roman languages] (in Italian). Milan: U. Hoepli. ISBN 978-88-203-4166-4.
- Marchesini, Simona (2013). "I rapporti etrusco/retico-italici nella prima Italia alla luce dei dati linguistici: il caso della "mozione" etrusca". Rivista storica dell'antichità (in Italian). 43. Bologna: Pàtron editore: 9–32. ISSN 0300-340X.
- Marchesini, Simona (2019). "L'onomastica nella ricostruzione del lessico: il caso di Retico ed Etrusco" [Onomastics in the reconstruction of the lexicon: the case of Rhaetian and Etruscan]. Mélanges de l'École française de Rome: Antiquité (in Italian). 131 (1). Rome: École française de Rome: 123–136. doi:10.4000/mefra.7613. ISBN 978-2-7283-1428-7. S2CID 214398787.
- Marzatico, Franco (2019). "I Reti e i popoli delle Alpi orientali". Preistoria Alpina (in Italian). 49bis. Trento: MUSE-Museo delle Scienze: 73–82. ISSN 2035-7699.
- Mellaart, James (1975). The Neolithic of the Near East. World of Archeology. New York: Scribner. ISBN 978-0-684-14483-2.
- Myres, J.L. (1907), "A history of the Pelasgian theory", Journal of Hellenic Studies, London: Council of the Society: 169–225, "§ 16. Pelasgians and Tyrrhenians"
- Oettinger, Norbert (2010). "Seevölker und Etrusker". In Cohen, Yoram; Gilan, Amir; Miller, Jared L. (eds.). Pax Hethitica Studies on the Hittites and their Neighbours in Honour of Itamar Singer (in German). Wiesbaden: Otto Harrassowitz Verlag. pp. 233–246. ISBN 978-3-447-06119-3.
- Palmer, Leonard R. (1965). Mycenaeans and Minoans (2nd ed.). New York: Alfred A. Knopf.
- Posth, Cosimo; Zaro, Valentina; Spyrou, Maria A. (2021). "The origin and legacy of the Etruscans through a 2000-year archeogenomic time transect". Science Advances. 7 (39) eabi7673. Washington DC: American Association for the Advancement of Science. Bibcode:2021SciA....7.7673P. doi:10.1126/sciadv.abi7673. PMC 8462907. PMID 34559560.
- Rix, Helmut (1998). Rätisch und Etruskisch [Rhaetian & Etruscan]. Vorträge und kleinere Schriften (in German). Innsbruck: Innsbrucker Beiträge zur Sprachwissenschaft: Institut für Sprachwissenschaft der Universität Innsbruck.
- Rix, Helmut (2008). "Etruscan". In Woodard, Roger D. (ed.). The Ancient Languages of Europe. Cambridge: Cambridge University Press. pp. 141–164. doi:10.1017/CBO9780511486814.010. ISBN 978-0-511-48681-4.
- Schumacher, Stefan (1998). "Sprachliche Gemeinsamkeiten zwischen Rätisch und Etruskisch" [Linguistic similarities between Raetic and Etruscan]. Der Schlern (in German). 72: 90–114.
- Schumacher, Stefan (2004) [1992]. Die rätischen Inschriften. Geschichte und heutiger Stand der Forschung [The Rhaetian inscriptions. History and current state of research]. Sonderheft (in German) (2nd ed.). Innsbruck: Innsbrucker Beiträge zur Kulturwissenschaft: Institut für Sprachwissenschaft der Universität Innsbruck.
- Shipley, Lucy (2017). "Where is home?". The Etruscans: Lost Civilizations. London: Reaktion Books. pp. 28–46. ISBN 978-1-78023-862-3.
- Steinbauer, Dieter H. (1999). Neues Handbuch des Etruskischen [New Handbook on Etruscan] (in German). St. Katharinen: Scripta Mercaturae Verlag. ISBN 978-3-89590-080-8.
- Van der Meer, L. Bouke (2004). "Etruscan origins. Language and archaeology". Babesch. 79: 51–57.
- Wallace, Rex E. (2010). "Italy, Languages of". In Gagarin, Michael (ed.). The Oxford Encyclopedia of Ancient Greece and Rome. Oxford, UK: Oxford University Press. pp. 97–102. doi:10.1093/acref/9780195170726.001.0001. ISBN 978-0-19-517072-6.
- Wallace, Rex E. (2018), "Lemnian language", Oxford Research Encyclopedia of Classics, Oxford, UK: Oxford University Press, doi:10.1093/acrefore/9780199381135.013.8222, ISBN 978-0-19-938113-5
