= Lemnian language =

Extinct ancient language of Lemnos, modern Greece

Lemnian
- Native to: Greece
- Region: Lemnos
- Era: attested 6th century BC
- Language family: Tyrsenian: Etruscan; Lemnian
- Writing system: Greek alphabet

Language codes
- ISO 639-3: xle
- Glottolog: lemn1237
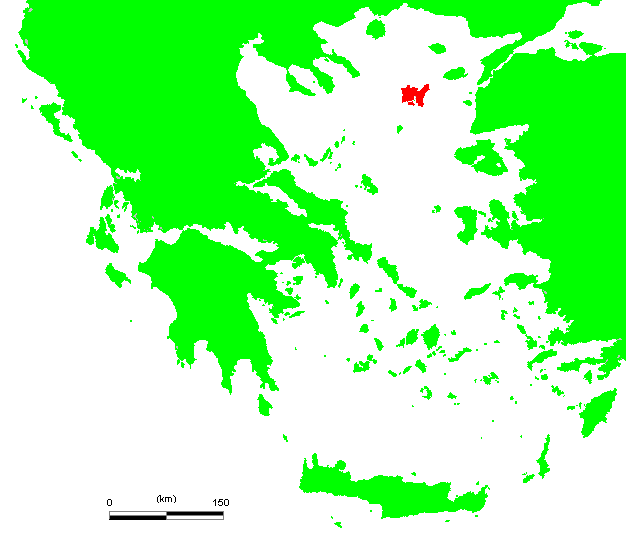
- Location of Lemnos

The Lemnian language is an extinct Tyrsenian language attested by inscriptions from the island of Lemnos, Greece, dating to the second half of the 6th century BC. It is mainly attested by an inscription found on a funerary stele, termed the Lemnos stele, discovered in 1885 near Kaminia. Fragments of inscriptions on local pottery show that it was spoken there by a community. In 2009, a newly discovered inscription was reported from the site of Hephaistia, the principal ancient city of Lemnos. Lemnian is largely accepted as being a Tyrsenian language, and as such related to Etruscan and Raetic. After the Athenians conquered the island in the latter half of the 6th century BC, Lemnian was replaced by Attic Greek.

== Classification ==
Tyrsenian language family tree as proposed by de Simone and Marchesini (2013)

A relationship between Lemnian, Raetic and Etruscan, as a Tyrsenian language family, has been proposed by German linguist Helmut Rix due to close connections in vocabulary and grammar. For example,

- Both Etruscan and Lemnian share two unique dative cases, type-I *-si and type-II *-ale, shown both on the Lemnos Stele (Hulaie-ši, 'for Hulaie', Φukiasi-ale, 'for the Phocaean') and in inscriptions written in Etruscan (aule-si, 'to Aule', on the Cippus Perusinus; as well as the inscription mi mulu Laris-ale Velχaina-si, meaning 'I was blessed for Laris Velchaina');
- A few lexical correspondences have been noted, such as Lemnian avis ('year') and Etruscan avils (genitive case); or Lemnian šialχvis ('sixty') and Etruscan šealχls (genitive case), both sharing the same internal structure "number + decade suffix + inflectional ending" (Lemnian: ši + alχvi + -s, Etruscan: še + alχl + s);
- They also share the genitive in *-s and a simple past tense in *-a-i (Etruscan -⟨e⟩ as in ame 'was' (< *amai); Lemnian -⟨ai⟩ as in šivai, meaning 'lived').

Rix's Tyrsenian family is supported by a number of linguists such as Stefan Schumacher, Carlo De Simone, Norbert Oettinger, Simona Marchesini, or Rex E. Wallace. Common features between Etruscan, Raetic, and Lemnian have been observed in morphology, phonology, and syntax. On the other hand, few lexical correspondences are documented, at least partly due to the scanty number of Raetic and Lemnian texts and possibly to the early date at which the languages split. The Tyrsenian family (or Common Tyrrhenic) is often considered to be Paleo-European and to predate the arrival of Indo-European languages in southern Europe.

As for the internal structure of the family, de Simone and Marchesini have proposed that Raetic was the first to separate from the common ancestor, displaying a more archaic linguistic stage, while Lemnian branched off later from a node closer to Etruscan. On this model the Raetic-Etruscan split is older than the Lemnian-Etruscan one, and Lemnian is genetically closer to Etruscan than Raetic is. Simon (2025) draws a further consequence from this arrangement: since Raetic is by far the most divergent of the three and must therefore have broken away considerably earlier, an Anatolian origin for the family would require either two distinct migrations from Anatolia, or a single one carried by speakers whose languages were already only remotely akin, for neither of which is there any evidence after the Neolithic period. An Italian origin for Lemnian requires no such assumptions.

Rix had originally placed the split of Common Tyrrhenic in the last quarter of the 2nd millennium BC, but explicitly declined to locate the homeland of the proto-language, presenting two alternative scenarios as equally open: either the homeland lay in the northern Aegean, with speakers of proto-Etruscan and proto-Raetic migrating westward at the end of the 2nd millennium, or it lay in central Italy, with speakers of proto-Lemnian migrating eastward and proto-Raetic speakers northward. Later evidence, in particular the 2009 discovery of a new Tyrsenian inscription at Hephaistia and the archaeogenetic results published in 2021, led de Simone and Marchesini to revise the chronology of the split and to favour an expansion from Italy toward the Aegean.

According to Dutch historian Luuk De Ligt, the Lemnian language could have arrived in the Aegean Sea during the Late Bronze Age, when Mycenaean rulers recruited groups of mercenaries from Sicily, Sardinia and various parts of the Italian peninsula. De Ligt's argument does not start from Lemnian itself, but from an Eteocretan inscription from Praisos in Crete, which he takes to be written in an Indo-European language of the Oscan-Umbrian branch of Italic, and from which he infers an Italian homeland for part of the Sea Peoples.

=== Comparative features ===
Alongside the correspondences listed above, systematic differences between Lemnian and Etruscan have been identified. Marchesini (2024) treats Lemnian as an archaic variety of Etruscan with a number of independent developments. Archaisms preserved in Lemnian include the -i- in the root alχvi- in chronological formulae (Lemnian śivai aviś sialχveiś against Etruscan zivas avilś LXXVI) and the third person singular perfect in -ai (śivai, aomai), as opposed to the -e ending of recent Etruscan. Independent Lemnian developments include the weakening of /l/ before /s/ (aviś 'years' against Etruscan avilś) and a type-II genitive in -ial. Conversely, several features characteristic of historical Etruscan are absent from Lemnian, as they are from Raetic: the syncope of post-tonic vowels, the two-part gentilicial name system, and the feminine marker in -i. These are generally regarded as innovations that Etruscan developed through contact with the Indo-European populations of central Italy.

=== Archaeological evidence ===
The relationship between the linguistic and the archaeological record has been a persistent problem in the debate. Yves Duhoux (2014) observes that despite extensive excavation no artefact typical of Etruria in Italy has ever been found on Lemnos, and that the Lemnian archaeological record differs radically from the Etruscan one, which may indicate a very early separation between the two communities. Marchesini (2024) addresses the same difficulty by arguing that the Tyrrhenians of Lemnos were primarily traders and pirates, seafarers who carried technological skills such as metalworking and navigation rather than the material culture of their homeland, and that the linguistic and the cultural levels should therefore be kept distinct. Gian Franco Chiai (2024) likewise notes that the archaeological record has yielded no Etruscan-made artefacts on Lemnos, whether imported or locally produced, but argues that this absence is not sufficient to rule out a small Etruscan community integrated into local society, which would have assimilated its culture and customs while preserving its own language.

Scholars such as Michel Gras and Carlo De Simone think that Lemnian is the testimony of an Etruscan commercial settlement on the island that took place before 700 BC, not related to the Sea Peoples. Norbert Oettinger, while likewise deriving the Tyrrhenians of Lemnos from Italy, connects their movement eastward to the context of the Sea Peoples. Simon (2025) endorses this explanation.

After more than 90 years of archaeological excavations at Lemnos, nothing has been found that would support a migration from Lemnos to Etruria or to the Alps where Raetic was spoken. The indigenous inhabitants of Lemnos, also called in ancient times Sinteis, were the Sintians, a Thracian population.

A 2021 archeogenetic analysis of Etruscan individuals concluded that the Etruscans were autochthonous and genetically similar to the Early Iron Age Latins, and that the Etruscan language, and therefore the other languages of the Tyrsenian family, may be a surviving language of the ones that were widespread in Europe from at least the Neolithic period before the arrival of the Indo-European languages, as already argued by German geneticist Johannes Krause who concluded that it is likely that the Etruscan language (as well as Basque, Paleo-Sardinian and Minoan) "developed on the continent in the course of the Neolithic Revolution". The lack of recent Anatolian-related admixture and Iranian-related ancestry among the Etruscans, who genetically joined firmly to the European cluster, might also suggest that the presence of a handful of inscriptions found at Lemnos, in a language related to Etruscan and Raetic, "could represent population movements departing from the Italian peninsula".

== Ancient sources ==
Greek traditions about Lemnos can be arranged in three successive phases, which together form what Chiai (2024) describes as the Greek cultural memory of the island. In the first, corresponding to the Homeric level, Lemnos appears as a wealthy centre of maritime trade which took no side in the war at Troy and was governed by Euneus, son of Jason and Hypsipyle, its population thus being Greek by descent. In the second, the island is inhabited by the Sinties, a Thracian people whom Homer calls agriophonoi ('of wild speech'), devoted to the cult of Hephaestus and to metalworking; the epithet marks them as ethnically non-Greek. In the third phase, according to a tradition transmitted by Hellanicus of Lesbos, Tyrrhenians arrived on the island with five ships and mixed with the Sinties, who by then had themselves become mixellenes, half-Greeks.

The Greek name of the island in this second phase, Aithale ('smoky'), refers to the metallurgical activity introduced by Hephaestus; the same name was borne in antiquity by the island of Elba off the Etruscan coast, likewise known for its metal deposits.

Chiai emphasises that all these traditions represent an external, Greek view of the island: there is no evidence that they reflect local myths elaborated by the Lemnians themselves before the Athenian conquest. He also distinguishes between the two ethnic labels the sources apply to the island's population. The Pelasgians are a category of Greek mythical discourse, used for primordial peoples felt to be related to the Greeks yet not Greek, whereas the Tyrrhenians were a real people documented in Italy. The Greeks consequently found it difficult to place the Tyrrhenians within mythical stratigraphy at all, which accounts for the contradictory and non-homogeneous character of the traditions concerning this last phase.

== Phonology ==
=== Vowels ===
The Lemnian writing system employs four vowel signs: a, e, i and o. As in Etruscan, no distinction is made between /u/ and /o/, but unlike the Etruscan alphabet of Italy, which adopted upsilon, Lemnian uses omicron for the back vowel.

== Writing system ==
The classification of the Lemnian alphabet has long been debated. Adolf Kirchhoff in 1887 attributed it to the group of Western Greek ("red") alphabets, characterized by the use of a trident sign for the velar aspirate /ch/, in contrast with the "blue" alphabets prevalent in the northern Aegean, where the same sign represented the affricate /ps/. The red type is found in most parts of central and northern mainland Greece (Thessaly, Boeotia and most of the Peloponnese), as well as the island of Euboea, and in colonies associated with these places, including most colonies in Italy. This attribution presented geographical difficulties, since Lemnos was surrounded by "blue" alphabet territory.

For much of the twentieth century, the prevailing view held that Lemnian was most closely related to the archaic alphabet in use at Cere (ancient Caere) in southern Etruria, in Italy, one of the oldest and best attested Etruscan alphabets. This position was supported by Michel Lejeune (1957) and argued forcefully by Carlo De Simone (1995, 1996), who treated it as a key argument for the Tyrrhenians of Lemnos having originated from Etruria. De Simone and Chiai (2001) further maintained the presence of syllabic punctuation in inscription A of the Kaminia stele, a phenomenon exclusive to southern Etruria between the second half of the 6th and the first half of the 5th century BC, which, if confirmed, would have constituted decisive evidence for derivation from the Etruscan alphabet.

These conclusions have been contested on multiple grounds. Luciano Agostiniani (1986, 2012) listed systematic discrepancies between the Lemnian and Etruscan alphabets: the use of omicron rather than upsilon for the high back vowel; the absence of the digraph *vh/hv* for the labiodental fricative /f/; the use of an angular sign (absent from Etruscan) for the sibilant /s/; lambda with the apex pointing upward and a four-stroke mu, in contrast with Etruscan lambda with apex pointing downward and a five-stroke mu. On the question of syllabic punctuation, Agostiniani (2012) observed that the three instances of non-verbal punctuation on the stele all appear in the same context (word-final s) and only in inscription A, never in the other inscriptions of the corpus, suggesting an idiosyncrasy of scribe A rather than a systematic graphic norm. The rigid red/blue dichotomy proposed by Kirchhoff is now considered outdated by most scholars.

The hypothesis currently favored, proposed by Heiner Eichner (2019) and developed by Marchesini (2024), identifies the alphabet of Samothrace as the primary model for the Lemnian script. The archaic vase inscriptions of Samothrace share with Lemnian the two forms (round and square) of omicron and theta, the two sigma signs (three- and four-stroke), and the trident sign for /ch/. A further element in favor of a local Aegean origin for the Lemnian alphabet is the angular sign used for the sibilant /s/: structurally foreign to the Greek tradition and to the Etruscan alphabet, it appears identically in Palaeo-Phrygian inscriptions with the value of /j/ (semiconsonantal i), its integration into the Lemnian alphabet with a different value being typical of local alphabet adaptation processes.

The main differences between the Lemnian and Etruscan alphabets (the use of omicron instead of upsilon, the absence of the digraph FH for the labiodental fricative /f/, lambda with the apex pointing upward rather than downward) make a direct derivation from the southern Etruscan alphabet improbable. In particular, the different rendering of the back vowel (upsilon in Etruria, omicron in Lemnos) constitutes for Duhoux (2014) direct linguistic evidence that the two communities were already separate when they learned to write, that is, before 700 BC in Etruria and before 600 BC in Lemnos.

A new autoptic analysis of the Kaminia stele, conducted by Marchesini in 2023 under raking light during its display at the Fondazione Luigi Rovati in Milan, cast further doubt on the existence of syllabic punctuation on the stele: the presumed gaps previously interpreted as traces of such punctuation appear to be largely natural porosity of the sandstone, a conclusion that converges, by a different route, with that already reached by Agostiniani (2012) on textual grounds.

== Inscriptions ==
The Lemnian corpus consists of sixteen inscriptions, most of them single words incised or painted on ceramic vessels, with the stone monuments providing the bulk of the evidence for the language. They comprise the two texts on the funerary stele of Kaminia, four graffiti on pottery from the settlement of Hephaistia, ten inscriptions from the sanctuary of the Cabeiri at Chloi, and a stone dedication base from the area of the theatre at Hephaistia, published in 2009. A substantial series of isolated letters and signs is also attested. All these documents predate the Attic colonization and show a high degree of standardization in the writing system.

=== Lemnos Stele ===
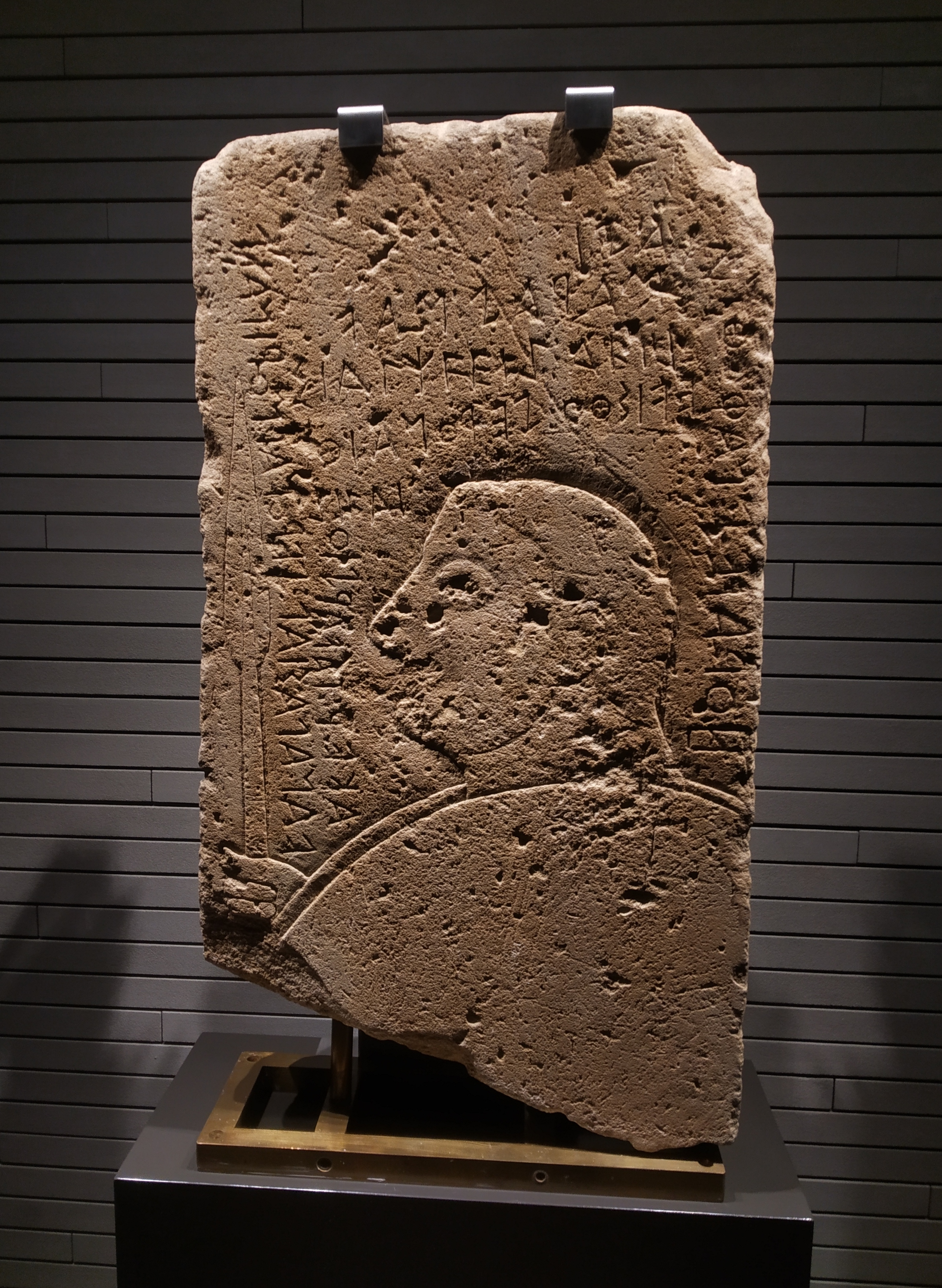
The Stele of Lemnos.

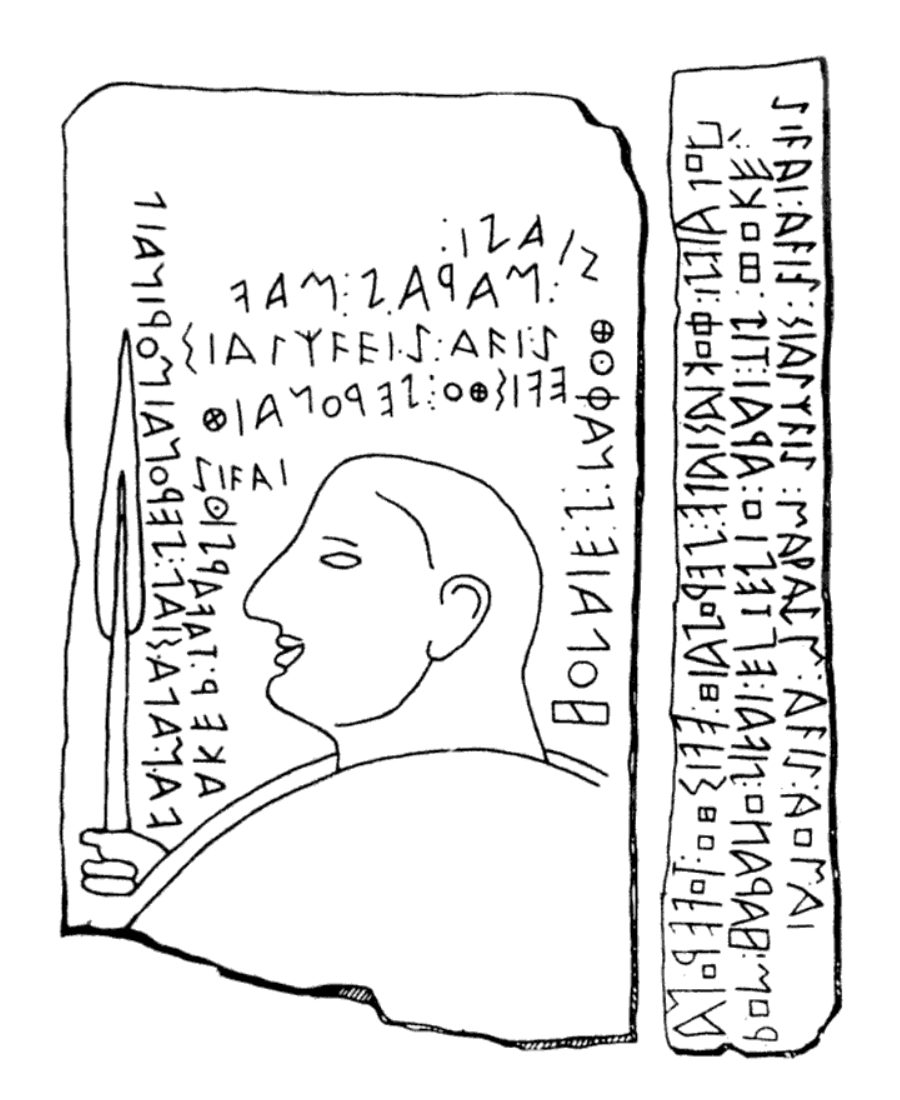
A transcription of the stele.

The stele, also known as the stele of Kaminia, was found built into a church wall in Kaminia and is now at the National Archaeological Museum of Athens. The 6th century date is based on the fact that in 510 BC the Athenian Miltiades invaded Lemnos and hellenized it. The stele bears a low-relief bust of a male soldier and is inscribed in an archaic Greek alphabet whose origin is debated (see Writing system). The inscription is in Boustrophedon style, and has been transliterated but had not been successfully translated until serious linguistic analysis based on comparisons with Etruscan, combined with breakthroughs in Etruscan's own translation started to yield fruit.

The inscription consists of 198 characters forming 33 to 40 words, word separation sometimes indicated with one to three dots. The text on the front consists of three parts, two written vertically (1; 6-7) and one horizontally (2-5). Comprehensible is the phrase sivai avis šialχvis ('lived forty' years, B.3), reminiscent of Etruscan maχs śealχis-c ('and forty-five years'), seeming to refer to the person to whom this funerary monument was dedicated, holaiesi φokiašiale ('to Holaie Phokiaš' B.1), who appeared to have been an official called maras at some point marasm avis aomai ('and was a maras one year'B3), compare Etruscan -m "and" (postposition), and maru. Oddly, this text also contains a word naφoθ that seems to be connected to Etruscan nefts "nephew/uncle"; but this is may be borrowing from Latin nepot-, suggesting that the speakers of this language migrated at some point from the Italic peninsula (or independently borrowed this Indo-European word from somewhere else). Alwin Kloekhorst (2022) suggested instead that naφoθ is more likely to have been borrowed from Phrygian nevot-, with the same meaning, which would point toward an Anatolian origin for the speakers of Lemnian. This interpretation is weakened by two considerations. First, the origin of the Phrygian language is itself debated: several linguists consider it Balkan rather than Anatolian in origin, which would undercut the Anatolian implication of Kloekhorst's argument. Second, and more broadly, Zsolt Simon (2021) collected and assessed forty-four proposed Anatolian loanwords in Etruscan, concluding that the overwhelming majority are philologically untenable. Nine cases remain formally possible, but six of these are semantically problematic and consist mostly of particles and pronouns, forms short enough that coincidence cannot be excluded. Simon takes this as sufficient to set aside the theory of Anatolian loanwords in Etruscan, and with it the only potentially decisive argument for an Anatolian origin of the language.

G. Kleinschmidt in 1893 proposed a translation of the expression haralio eptesio - king έπιτιδημ, presumably referring to the king/tyrant of Athens Hippias, who died in Lemnos in 490 BC.

Transcription:

front:

A.1. holaies:naφoθ:siasi
A.2. maras:mav
A.3. šialχveis:avis
A.4. evišθo:seronaiθ
A.5. sivai
A.6. aker:tavarsio
A.7. vanalašial:seronai:morinail

side:

B.1. holaiesi:φokiašiale:seronaiθ:evišθo:toverona
B.2. rom:haralio:sivai:eptesio:arai:tis:φoke
B.3. sivai:avis:šialχvis:marasm:avis:aomai

Jacques Heurgon (1980) proposed reading in text B a reference to the Ionian city of Phocaea (φokiašiale, φoke), interpreting the stele as a monument to Holaies, a Phocaean who settled on Lemnos after the Persian siege of his native city in 545 BC and became a leader of the anti-Persian resistance on the island. The reading is consistent with the depiction of an armed figure on the stele and with the prominence given to that figure in the text. Linguistic objections concerning the rendering of the Greek name Hylaios as Holaie were raised by Michel Lejeune, to which Heurgon replied that oral transmission could preserve the aspiration; the presence of aspiration in Lemnian is confirmed by the term heloke on the dedication base from Hephaistia. Marchesini (2024) regards this interpretation as still the most straightforward, given the documented proximity between Lemnos and Phocaea in the 6th century BC.

=== Hephaistia inscription ===
Another Lemnian inscription was found during excavations at Hephaistia on the island of Lemnos in 2009, on a stone dedication base from the area of the Hellenistic theatre, where an archaic sanctuary of the Cabeiri had previously stood. The inscription consists of 26 letters arranged in two lines of boustrophedonic script. Its publication enlarged the available Lemnian corpus and provided the term heloke, which documents the presence of aspiration in Lemnian and has been used in the discussion of the Phocaean interpretation of the Kaminia stele.

Transcription:

upper line (left to right):

hktaonosi:heloke

lower line (right to left):

soromš:aslaš

== See also ==
- Eteocretan language
- Tyrsenian languages
- Paleo-European languages
