= Dreros =

Ancient settlement in Crete

Coordinates: 35°15′24″N 25°37′42″E

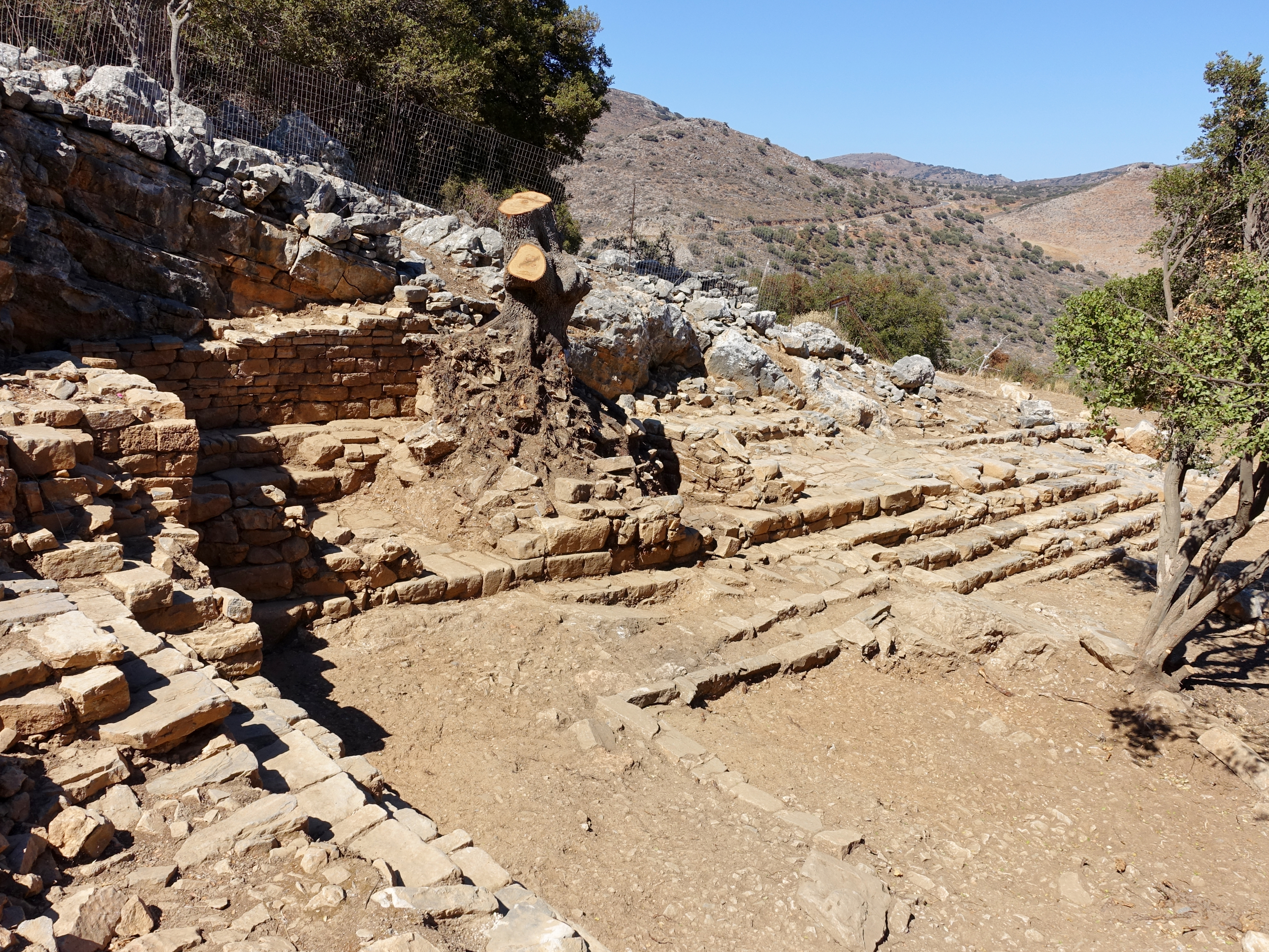

Dreros (Ancient Greek: Δρῆρος), also (representing Modern Greek pronunciation) Driros, near Neapoli in the regional unit of Lasithi, Crete, is a post-Minoan archaeological site, 16 km (10 mi) northwest of Agios Nikolaos. Known only by a chance remark of the 9th-century Byzantine grammarian Theognostus (De orthographia), archaeology of the site shows Dreros to have been initially colonised by mainland Greeks in the early Archaic Period about the same time as Lato and Prinias.

== Archaeology ==
The early Iron Age site, first excavated in 1917, was most prosperous in the 8th – 6th centuries BCE; later it became a minor satellite of Knossos and continued to be occupied into the Byzantine period. It comprises two acropoleis with an Archaic-period agora between them. Almost the whole of the city and its necropolis have been excavated, confirming that this is a post-Minoan Greek habitation; its inscriptions are in Dorian dialect. Traces of fortifications have been discovered.

There is also a large communal cistern dug between the late 3rd and early 2nd century BCE, which contained Archaic inscriptions, one of which, famous as the Dreros inscription, the "sacred law of Dreros", is the earliest complete record of constitutional law found in Greece, which mentions the Dorian Cretan titles kosmos and damios.

In Hellenistic times, Dreros declined in importance to the extent that it was not included among the thirty Cretan cities that signed a pact with the Attalid king of Pergamum, Eumenes II, in 183 BCE.

=== Temple of Apollo Delphinios ===
South of the agora is one of the earliest free-standing Greek temples; it dates from the Geometric period (c. 750 BCE). The Delphinion, as it is called, was dedicated to Apollo Delphinios. It was excavated in 1935 by Spyridon Marinatos, who published it.

Three statuettes made of bronze sheets hammered over moulding cores (sphyrelaton) "in the early orientalizing style of the late eighth century" (Boardman) were found in the precincts of the Temple of Apollo Delphinios; they are now at the Archaeological Museum of Herakleion. They probably depict Apollo and Artemis and their mother Leto and together are known as the "Dreros Triad."

=== Eteocretan inscriptions ===
Two Eteocretan inscriptions on blocks of grey schist were excavated in 1936 by Pierre Demargne and Henri van Effenterre from the western part of the large cistern mentioned above. These inscriptions were housed in the museum at Neapolis, but were lost during the Germano-Italian occupation of Crete during World War II.
