= Greek law =

Greek law may refer to either

- Ancient Greek law, or
- the Greek continuation and expansion of Roman law in the east, Byzantine law, or
- Greek law (Hellenic Republic), the law of modern Greece, the Hellenic Republic.
