= Tyrrhenians =

Name used by the ancient Greeks to refer to non-Greek people

Tyrrhenians (Attic Greek: Τυῤῥηνοί Tyrrhēnoi) or Tyrsenians (Ionic: Τυρσηνοί Tyrsēnoi; Doric: Τυρσανοί Tyrsānoi) were names used by the ancient Greeks to refer, in a generic sense, to non-Greek people, in particular pirates. While ancient sources have been interpreted in a variety of ways, the Greeks always called the Etruscans Tyrsenoi, although not all Tyrsenians were Etruscans. The term "Tyrrhenians" was sometimes used by ancient writers to refer to other ethnic groups in central-western Italy, such as the Latins. Dionysius of Halicarnassus stated that the Greeks once called Latins, Umbrians, Ausonians, and others "Tyrrhenians," and that Rome was called a Tyrrhenian city.

Furthermore the languages of Etruscan, Rhaetian and Lemnian cultures have been grouped together as the Tyrsenian languages, based on their strong similarities.

Tyrrhenian languages

== Earliest references ==
The names are believed to be exonyms, only known to have been used by authors of Ancient Greek, though their origin is uncertain and apparently not Greek. They have been connected to τύρσις (túrsis), also a "Mediterranean" loan into Greek, meaning "tower". Direct connections with Tuscī, the Latin exonym for the Etruscans, from *Turs-ci, have also been attempted. The French linguist Françoise Bader has alternatively hypothesized that Tyrsenoi–Tyrrhenoi derives from the Proto-Indo-European root *trh₂- meaning "to cross".

The first Greek author to mention the Tyrrhenians is the 8th-century BC Greek poet Hesiod, in his work, the Theogony. He merely described them as residing in central Italy alongside the Latins.

And Circe the daughter of Helios, Hyperion's son, loved steadfast Odysseus and bore Agrius and Latinus who was faultless and strong; also she brought forth Telegonus by the will of golden Aphrodite. And they ruled over the famous Tyrsenians, very far off in a recess of the holy islands.

The Homeric hymn to Dionysus has Tyrsenian pirates seizing Dionysus:

Presently there came swiftly over the sparkling sea
Tyrsenian pirates on a well-decked ship – a miserable doom led them on.

After Herodotus' Histories a party of Lydians, wretched by a persistent famine, decided to migrate. Led by Tyrsenos, son of Atys, king of Lydia, they sailed to the west coast of central Italy where they settled in the region of the Umbri.

They no longer called themselves Lydians, but Tyrrhenians, after the name of the king's son who had led them there.

== Late references ==
The Tyrrhenians are referred to as pirates by Ephorus of Cyme as reported by Strabo. The pirating actions of the Tyrrhenians would not have allowed the Greeks to found their colonies in Sicily before the 8th century BC.

According to Ephorus these were the earliest Greek cities to be founded in Sicily, that is, in the tenth generation after the Trojan war; for before that time men were so afraid of the bands of Tyrrhenian pirates and the savagery of the barbarians in this region that they would not so much as sail thither for trafficking.

In the 6th and 5th centuries BC, the name referred specifically to the Etruscans for whom the Tyrrhenian Sea is named, according to Strabo. In Pindar, the Tyrsenoi appear allied with the Carthaginians as a threat to Magna Graecia:

I entreat you, son of Cronus,
grant that the battle-shouts of the Carthaginians and Tyrrhenians stay quietly at home,
now that they have seen their arrogance bring lamentation to their ships off Cumae.

The name is also attested in a fragment by Sophocles.

The name becomes increasingly associated with the generic Pelasgians. Herodotus places them in Crestonia in Thrace, as neighbours of the Pelasgians. Similarly, Thucydides mentions them together with the Pelasgians and associates them with Lemnian pirates and with the pre-Greek population of Attica.

Lemnos remained relatively free of Greek influence until Hellenistic times, and the Lemnos stele of the 6th century BC was inscribed with a language very similar to Etruscan, which has led to the postulation of a Tyrrhenian language family of Etruscan, Lemnian and Raetic.

There is therefore evidence demonstrating the existence of a linguistic relationship between the so-called Lemnian language and Etruscan. The circumstances regarding this phenomenon are still debated today; most scholars attribute the presence in Lemnos of a language related to Etruscan, attested in Italy, to a movement eastward of Etruscan groups from Italy around the eighth century, placing the homeland of the Etruscans in Italy and the Alps, particularly because of their relation to the Alpine Rhaetian population. Another hypothesis connecting the Tyrrhenians and the Etruscans posits that the Etruscans derive at least partially from a 12th century BC invasion from the Aegean and Anatolia imposing itself over the Villanovan culture, with some scholars claiming a relationship or at least evidence of close contact between the Anatolian languages and the Etruscan language and adherents of the latter school of thought point to the legend of Lydian origin of the Etruscans referred to by Herodotus and Livy's statement that the Rhaetians were Etruscans driven into the mountains by the invading Gauls. Critics of the theory point to the lack of concrete evidence of a linguistic relationship of Etruscan with Anatolian, and to Dionysius of Halicarnassus, who decidedly argues against an Etruscan-Lydian relationship. Furthermore, there is no archaeological evidence from material culture of such a cultural shift and of an eastern origins of the Etruscans, in modern times, all the evidence gathered so far by etruscologists and archaeologists specializing in prehistory and protohistory points to an autochthonous origin of the Etruscans. Just as the archaeological evidence is against the idea that the Rhaetians are descended from the Etruscans who fled from Po Valley because of the Gallic invasions, as the Rhaetians are archaeologically attested in their Alpine sites long before. Recent archaeogenetic studies have also concluded that the Etruscans were autochthonous, and that the lack of recent Anatolian-related admixture and Iranian-related ancestry among the Etruscans, who firmly cluster with Iron Age European populations, might suggest that the presence of a handful of inscriptions found on Lemnos, written in a language related to Etruscan and Raetic, could represent population movements departing from the Italian peninsula.

Dionysius of Halicarnassus states that "there was a time when the Latins, the Umbrians, the Ausonians and many others were all called Tyrrhenians by the Greeks, the remoteness of the countries inhabited by these nations making their exact distinctions obscure to those who lived at a distance."

=== Conjectured identification with the Teresh (Sea Peoples) ===
The identification of the Tyrsenians with the Teresh (Egyptian: trš.w), a group attested in Egyptian records of the late second millennium BC, remains a longstanding hypothesis without scholarly consensus or direct archaeological evidence. Academic scholarship has increasingly undermined the broader assumptions on which this equation rests, including genetic studies of Etruscan populations that found no evidence of a recent migration from Anatolia or the Aegean into central Italy. (Note: "Already in the 1840s Egyptologists had debated the identity of the "northerners, coming from all lands," who assisted the Libyan King Meryre in his attack upon Merneptah. Some scholars believed that Meryre's auxiliaries were merely his neighbors on the Libyan coast, while others identified them as Indo-Europeans from north of the Caucasus. It was one of Maspero's most illustrious predecessors, Emmanuel de Rougé, who proposed that the names reflected the lands of the northern Mediterranean: the Lukka, Ekwesh, Tursha, Shekelesh, and Shardana were men from Lydia, Achaea, Tyrsenia (western Italy), Sicily, and Sardinia." De Rougé and others regarded Meryre's auxiliaries – these "peoples de la mer Méditerranée" – as mercenary bands, since the Sardinians, at least, were known to have served as mercenaries already in the early years of Ramesses the Great. Thus the only "migration" that the Karnak Inscription seemed to suggest was an attempted encroachment by Libyans upon neighboring territory.)

== See also ==
- Etruscans
