= Linear B Syllabary =

- Range: U+10000..U+1007F (128 code points)
- Plane: SMP
- Scripts: Linear B
- Major alphabets: Linear B Greek
- Assigned: 88 code points
- Unused: 40 reserved code points

Unicode version history
- 4.0 (2003): 88 (+88)

Unicode documentation
- Code chart ∣ Web page

Linear B Syllabary is a Unicode block containing characters for the syllabic writing of Mycenaean Greek and Minoan.

== Block ==
Linear B Syllabary^{[1]}^{[2]} Official Unicode Consortium code chart (PDF)
	0	1	2	3	4	5	6	7	8	9	A	B	C	D	E	F
U+1000x	𐀀	𐀁	𐀂	𐀃	𐀄	𐀅	𐀆	𐀇	𐀈	𐀉	𐀊	𐀋		𐀍	𐀎	𐀏
U+1001x	𐀐	𐀑	𐀒	𐀓	𐀔	𐀕	𐀖	𐀗	𐀘	𐀙	𐀚	𐀛	𐀜	𐀝	𐀞	𐀟
U+1002x	𐀠	𐀡	𐀢	𐀣	𐀤	𐀥	𐀦		𐀨	𐀩	𐀪	𐀫	𐀬	𐀭	𐀮	𐀯
U+1003x	𐀰	𐀱	𐀲	𐀳	𐀴	𐀵	𐀶	𐀷	𐀸	𐀹	𐀺		𐀼	𐀽		𐀿
U+1004x	𐁀	𐁁	𐁂	𐁃	𐁄	𐁅	𐁆	𐁇	𐁈	𐁉	𐁊	𐁋	𐁌	𐁍		
U+1005x	𐁐	𐁑	𐁒	𐁓	𐁔	𐁕	𐁖	𐁗	𐁘	𐁙	𐁚	𐁛	𐁜	𐁝		
U+1006x																
U+1007x																
Notes: 1. As of Unicode version 16.0; 2. Grey areas indicate non-assigned code points

== History ==
The following Unicode-related documents record the purpose and process of defining specific characters in the Linear B Syllabary block:

Version	Final code points (Note: Proposed code points and characters names may differ from final code points and names)	Count	L2 ID	WG2 ID	Document
4.0	U+10000..1000B, 1000D..10026, 10028..1003A, 1003C..1003D, 1003F..1004D, 10050..1005D	88	L2/97-107		Jenkins, John H. (1997-05-27), Proposal to add the Linear B script to ISO/IEC 10646
4.0	U+10000..1000B, 1000D..10026, 10028..1003A, 1003C..1003D, 1003F..1004D, 10050..1005D	88	L2/00-128		Bunz, Carl-Martin (2000-03-01), Scripts from the Past in Future Versions of Unicode
4.0	U+10000..1000B, 1000D..10026, 10028..1003A, 1003C..1003D, 1003F..1004D, 10050..1005D	88	L2/01-084		Anderson, Deborah (2001-01-28), Status Report on Aegean Script Proposal (Linear B, Aegean Numbers and Cypriot Syllabary)
4.0	U+10000..1000B, 1000D..10026, 10028..1003A, 1003C..1003D, 1003F..1004D, 10050..1005D	88	L2/01-149	N2327	Anderson, Deborah; Everson, Michael (2001-04-03), Revised proposal to encode Aegean scripts in the UCS
4.0	U+10000..1000B, 1000D..10026, 10028..1003A, 1003C..1003D, 1003F..1004D, 10050..1005D	88	L2/01-217		Anderson, Deborah (2001-05-20), Status Report on Aegean Script Proposal (Linear B, Aegean Numbers and Cypriot Syllabary)
4.0	U+10000..1000B, 1000D..10026, 10028..1003A, 1003C..1003D, 1003F..1004D, 10050..1005D	88	L2/01-184R		Moore, Lisa (2001-06-18), "Motion 87-M4", Minutes from the UTC/L2 meeting
4.0	U+10000..1000B, 1000D..10026, 10028..1003A, 1003C..1003D, 1003F..1004D, 10050..1005D	88	L2/01-370	N2378	Anderson, Deborah; Everson, Michael (2001-10-03), Final proposal to encode Aegean scripts in the UCS
4.0	U+10000..1000B, 1000D..10026, 10028..1003A, 1003C..1003D, 1003F..1004D, 10050..1005D	88	L2/02-154	N2403	Umamaheswaran, V. S. (2002-04-22), "Resolution M41.8", Draft minutes of WG 2 meeting 41, Hotel Phoenix, Singapore, 2001-10-15/19
4.0	U+10000..1000B, 1000D..10026, 10028..1003A, 1003C..1003D, 1003F..1004D, 10050..1005D	88	L2/02-160		Anderson, Deborah (2002-04-27), Status Report on Aegean Script Proposal and the Submission by the Thesaurus Linguae Graecae (TLG)
4.0	U+10000..1000B, 1000D..10026, 10028..1003A, 1003C..1003D, 1003F..1004D, 10050..1005D	88	L2/02-191		Anderson, Deborah (2002-05-01), Aegean Script Proposal [notes]
4.0	U+10000..1000B, 1000D..10026, 10028..1003A, 1003C..1003D, 1003F..1004D, 10050..1005D	88	L2/02-207	N2455	Anderson, Deborah; McGowan, Rick (2002-05-09), Request for changes in Aegean Scripts
