= Theognostus (disambiguation) =

Theognostus (fl. 14th century) was a metropolitan bishop of Kiev and All Rus.

Theognostus may also refer to:

- Theognostus of Alexandria (fl. 3rd century), theologian
- Theognostus the Grammarian (fl. 9th century), writer, known for his book Canones
- Theognostus, Augustal Prefect of Egypt (c. 482), a governor of Roman Egypt
