= Eteocretan language =

Pre-Greek language in Crete

Eteocretan
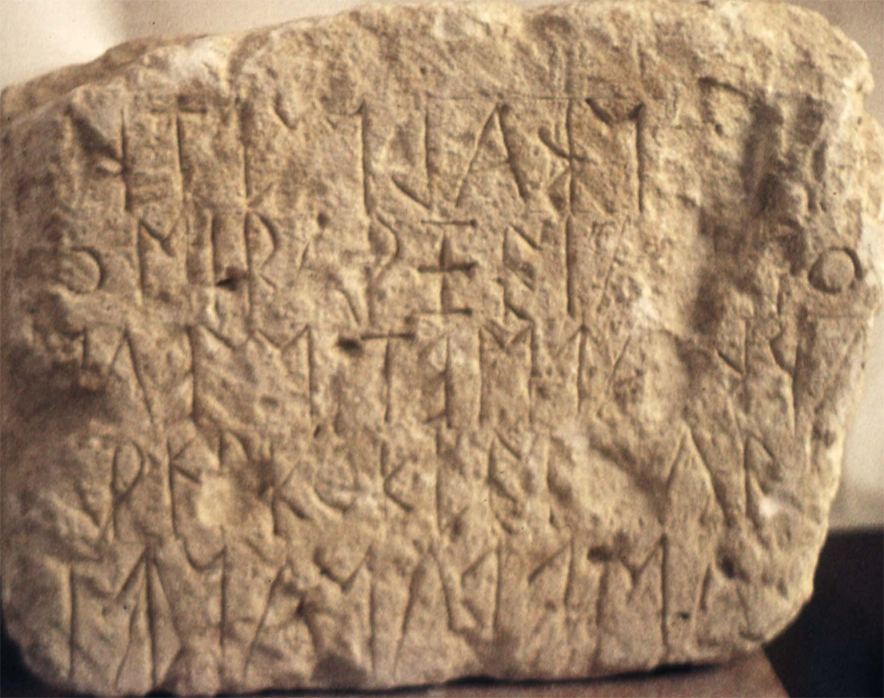
- Eteocretan Inscription from Praisos
- Native to: Dreros, Praisos
- Region: Crete
- Era: late 7th–3rd century BC
- Language family: unclassified
- Early form: Minoan (contested)
- Writing system: Greek alphabet

Language codes
- ISO 639-3: ecr
- Glottolog: eteo1236

Eteocretan (/ˌiːtioʊˈkriːtən, ˌɛt-/ from Ancient Greek: Ἐτεόκρητες, romanized: Eteókrētes, lit. 'true Cretans', itself composed from ἐτεός eteós 'true' and Κρής Krḗs 'Cretan') is the pre-Greek language attested in a few alphabetic inscriptions of ancient Crete.

In eastern Crete, about half a dozen inscriptions written in Greek alphabets have been found. These inscriptions date from the late 7th or early 6th century down to the 3rd century BC. The language is so far untranslated. It may be a survival of a language spoken on Crete before the arrival of the proto-Greek language and it has been suggested that it is derived from the Minoan language preserved in the Linear A inscriptions of a millennium earlier. Since that language remains undeciphered, it is not certain that Eteocretan and Minoan are related.

Ancient testimony suggests that the language is that of the Eteocretans (meaning 'true Cretans'). The term Eteocretan is sometimes applied to the Minoan language (or languages) written more than a millennium earlier in Cretan hieroglyphs (in reality, almost certainly a syllabary) and in the Linear A script. Yves Duhoux, a leading authority on Eteocretan, has stated that "it is essential to rigorously separate the study of Eteocretan from that of the 'hieroglyphic' and Linear A inscriptions".

== Ancient Greek sources ==
Odysseus, after returning home and pretending to be a grandson of Minos, tells his wife Penelope about his alleged homeland of Crete:

Κρήτη τις γαῖ' ἔστι μέσῳ ἐνὶ οἴνοπι πόντῳ,
καλὴ καὶ πίειρα, περίρρυτος· ἐν δ' ἄνθρωποι
πολλοί, ἀπειρέσιοι, καὶ ἐννήκοντα πόληες.
ἄλλη δ' ἄλλων γλῶσσα μεμιγμένη· ἐν μὲν Ἀχαιοί,
ἐν δ' Ἐτεόκρητες μεγαλήτορες, ἐν δὲ Κύδωνες,
Δωριέες τε τριχάϊκες δῖοί τε Πελασγοί.

Translation:

There is a land called Crete in the midst of the wine-dark sea,
a beautiful and fertile land, seagirt; in it are many
people, innumerable, and there are ninety cities.
Language with language is mingled together. There are Akhaians,
there are great-hearted Eteocretans, there are Kydones,
and Dorians in their three clans, and noble Pelasgians.

In the first century AD the geographer Strabo noted the following about the settlement of the different 'tribes' of Crete:

τούτων φησὶ Στάφυλος τὸ μὲν πρὸς ἔω Δοριεῖς κατέχειν, τὸ δὲ δυσμικόν Κύδωνας, τὸ δὲ νότιον Ἐτεόκρητας ὧν εἶναι πολίχνιον Πρᾶσον, ὅπου τὸ τοῦ Δικταίου Διὸς ἱερόν· τοὺς μὲν οὖν Ἐτεόκρητας καὶ Κύδωνας αὐτόχθονας ὑπάρξαι εἰκός, τοὺς δὲ λοιποὺς ἐπήλυδας, […]

Translation:

Of them [the peoples in the above passage] Staphylos says that the Dorians occupy the region towards the east, the Kydones the western part, the Eteocretans the southern, whose town is Prasos, where the temple of Diktaian Zeus is; and that the Eteocretans and Kydones are probably indigenous, but the others incomers, […]

Indeed, more than half of the known Eteocretan texts are from Praisos (Strabo's Πρᾶσος); the others were found at Dreros (modern Driros).

== Inscriptions ==
There are five inscriptions which are clearly Eteocretan, two of them bilingual with Greek. Three more fragments may be Eteocretan. The Eteocretan corpus is documented and discussed in Duhoux's L'Étéocrétois: les textes—la langue.

=== Dreros ===
The two bilingual inscriptions, together with six other Greek inscriptions, were found in the western part of the large Hellenistic cistern next to the east wall of the Delphinion (temple of Apollo Delphinios) in Dreros, at a depth between three and four metres. The texts are all written in the archaic Cretan alphabet and date from the late seventh or early sixth century BC. They record official religious and political decisions and probably came from the east wall of the Delphinion; they were published by Henri Van Effenterre in 1937 and 1946 and were kept in the museum at Neapolis.

The longer of these two inscriptions was found in the autumn of 1936 but not published until 1946. The Greek part of the text is very worn and could not easily be read. Almost certainly with modern technology the Greek part would yield more but the inscription was lost during the occupation of the island in World War II. Despite searches over 70 years, it has not been found.

The other Dreros inscription was also published by Van Effenterre in 1946. The Eteocretan part of the text has disappeared, only the fragment τυπρμηριηια (tuprmēriēia) remaining.

=== Praisos (or Praesos) ===
The other three certain Eteocretan inscriptions were published by Margherita Guarducci in the third volume of Inscriptiones Creticae, Tituli Cretae Orientalis, in 1942. The inscriptions are archived in the Archeological Museum at Heraklion. Raymond A. Brown, who examined these inscriptions in the summer of 1976, has published them online with slightly different transcriptions than those given by Guarducci.

The earliest of these inscriptions is, like the Dreros one, written in the archaic Cretan alphabet and likewise dates from the late 7th or early 6th century BC. The second of the Praisos inscriptions is written in the standard Ionic alphabet, except for lambda which is still written in the archaic Cretan style; it probably dates from the 4th century BC. The third inscription, dating probably from the 3rd century BC, is written in the standard Ionic alphabet with the addition of digamma or wau.

=== Psychro ===
Some publications also list the Psychro or Epioi inscription as Eteocretan, but some scholars deem it to be a modern forgery. They base their assessment on the fact that the inscription has five words, which bear no obvious resemblance to the language of the Dreros and Praisos inscriptions, apparently written in the Ionic alphabet of the third century BC, with the addition of three symbols which resemble the Linear A script of more than a millennium earlier. Their reasoning has since been challenged as unsubstantiated.

=== Other possible fragmentary inscriptions ===
Guarducci included three other fragmentary inscriptions; two of these fragments were also discussed by Yves Duhoux. The latter also discussed several other fragmentary inscriptions which might be Eteocretan. All these inscriptions, however, are so very fragmentary that it really is not possible to state with any certainty that they may not be Greek.

== Description ==
The inscriptions are too few to give much information about the language.

=== Lexicon ===
The early inscriptions written in the archaic Cretan alphabet do mark word division; the same goes for the two longer inscriptions from the fourth and third centuries BC.

From the Dreros inscriptions are the following words: et isalabre komn men inai isaluria lmo tuprmēriēia. Komn and lmo seem to show that /n/ and /l/ could be syllabic. As to the meanings of the words, nothing can be said with any certainty. Van Effenterre suggested:

- inai = Dorian Cretan ἔϝαδε (= classical Greek ἅδε, third singular aorist of ἅνδάνω) "it pleased [the council, the people]", i. e. "it was decided [that …]". The word ἔϝαδε occurs in the Greek part of the bilingual text, and all but one of the other Greek texts from the Delphinion in Dreros.
- tuprmēriēia = καθαρὸν γένοιτο in the Greek part of the inscription, i. e. "may it become pure".

Also, Van Effenterree noted that the word τυρό(ν) ("cheese") seems to occur twice in the Greek part of the first Dreros bilingual and suggested the text concerned the offering of goat cheese to Leto, the mother goddess of the Delphinion triad, and that the words isalabre and isaluria were related words with the meaning of "(goat) cheese".

The only clearly complete word on the earliest Praisos inscription is barze, and there is no indication of its meaning.

The other two Praisos inscriptions do not show word breaks. It has, however, been noted that in the second line of the fourth century inscription is phraisoi inai (φραισοι ιναι), and it has been suggested that it means "it pleased the Praisians" (ἔϝαδε Πραισίοις).

=== Classification ===
Despite their brevity, Eteocretan inscriptions reveal a language with no established links to Indo-European or Semitic languages; the language appears to have no obvious relation to any other known ancient language of the Aegean or Asia Minor. Raymond A. Brown, after listing a number of words of pre-Greek origin from Crete suggested a relation between Eteocretan, Minoan, and Tyrrhenian, coining the name "Aegeo-Asianic" for the proposed language family. This proposed group of languages was supported by G.M. Facchetti and S. Yatsemirsky, and was suggested to have a link to the pre-Indo-European languages of Anatolia by archaeologist James Mellaart. Despite occasional attempts to link Eteocretan to the Tyrrhenian languages, a lack of consensus persists, as argued by Helmut Rix, Carlo De Simone and other linguists. Modern linguistic analysis highlights the distinct internal characteristics of the Tyrrhenian group, which are not clearly mirrored in the surviving Eteocretan corpus.

In whatever case, unless further inscriptions, especially bilingual ones, are found, the Eteocretan language must remain unclassified. While Eteocretan is possibly descended from the Minoan language of the Linear A inscriptions of a millennium earlier, until there is an accepted decipherment of Linear A, that language must also remain unclassified and the question of a relationship between the two remains speculative, especially as there seem to have been other non-Greek languages spoken in Crete.

== See also ==
- Combinatorial method (linguistics)
- Cretan hieroglyphs
- Linear A
- Aegean languages
- Minoan language
- Eteocypriot language

== Literature ==
- Raymond A. Brown, "The Eteocretan Inscription from Psychro," in Kadmos, vol. 17, issue 1 (1978), p. 43 ff.
- Raymond A. Brown, Evidence for pre-Greek speech on Crete from Greek alphabetic sources. Adolf M. Hakkert, Amsterdam 1985.
- Henri Van Effenterre in Bulletin de correspondance hellénique, vol. 70 (1946), p. 602 f.
- Henri Van Effenterre in Revue de Philologie, third series, vol. 20, issue 2 (1946), pp. 131–138.
- Margarita Guarducci: Inscriptiones Creticae, vol. 3. Rome 1942, pp. 134–142.
- Yves Duhoux: L'Étéocrétois: les textes – la langue. J. C. Gieben, Amsterdam 1982. ISBN 90 70265 05 2.
- Papakitsos, Evangelos and Kenanidis, Ioannis, "The Eteocretan Inscription from Psychro (Crete) is Genuine", Anistoriton Journal, vol. 14 (2014-2015).
