= Dreros inscription =

Ancient Greek law inscription

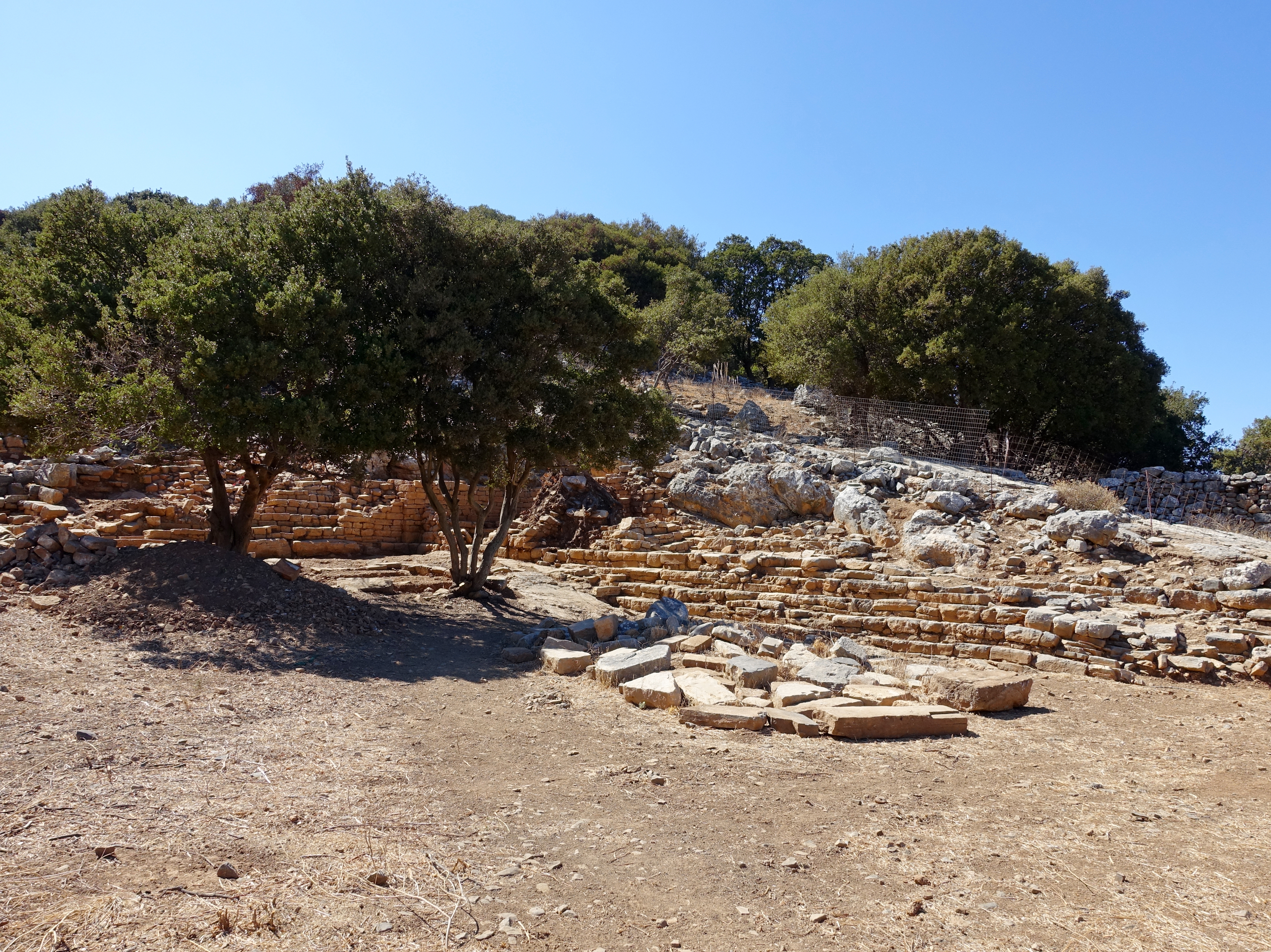
The ruins of Dreros

The Dreros inscription is the earliest surviving inscribed law from ancient Greece. It was discovered in Dreros, an ancient settlement on the island of Crete, in 1936, and first published by Pierre Demargne and Henri van Effenterre in 1937. Seven further inscriptions discovered at the same time were published in 1946.

Thirteen stones inscribed with archaic letters were discovered in a Hellenistic cistern in Dreros. These stones apparently came from the east wall of the temple of Apollo Delphinios, and make up eight inscriptions or fragments of inscriptions. This display of laws in public, often in sanctuaries, is a frequent feature of archaic Cretan law. The Dreros inscription is the longest of these eight laws. It is uncertain whether all eight laws are separate or part of a single code.

The Dreros law is inscribed on a block of grey schist. The block is broken into two parts, and in total measures 1.74 m × 0.25 m × 0.35 m (5 ft 9 in × 10 in × 1 ft 2 in). The block is inscribed with large, irregular letters 0.02 to 0.05 m (1 in to 2 in) high. Lilian H. Jeffery describes the lettering as "tall, thin, and straggling", and notes that it resembles the lettering on the Dedication of Nikandre. There are four full lines of text; in addition, between the first and second line there is a word inscribed in smaller letters. The first three full lines are written in boustrophedon – that is, alternating between right-to-left and left-to-right. The fourth line begins a new clause, and again begins from the right – this is the first known example of this system of paragraphing in a Greek text. Between the first and second line a word has been added in smaller letters.

The text dates to the second half of the seventh century BC, and is the oldest surviving Greek law. The law begins with an invocation to a god. It rules that anyone who holds the office of kosmos cannot hold it again for ten years after their term of office ends, and says that anyone who breaks the law is to be fined and deprived of civic rights. The final clause of the law lists the kosmos, daimoi, and the Twenty of the Polis as taking an oath to confirm the law. This restriction on holding the office of kosmos is paralleled in an inscription from Gortyn (the Gortyn code), also on Crete, though there the restriction on holding the office was only to once every three years.

== Works cited ==
- Ehrenberg, Victor (1943). "An Early Source of Polis-Constitution". The Classical Quarterly. 37 (1/2): 14–18. doi:10.1017/S0009838800026203.
- Jeffery, L.H. (1961). The Local Scripts of Archaic Greece: A Study of the Origin of the Greek Alphabet and its Development from the Eighth to the Fifth Centuries B.C. Oxford: Oxford University Press.
- McDonald, William A. (1956). "Note on a Fragment of an Archaic Inscription from Dreros". Hesperia: The Journal of the American School of Classical Studies at Athens. 25 (1). doi:10.2307/147106. JSTOR 147106.
- Osborne, Robin (2009). Greece in the Making: 1200–479 BC (2 ed.). London: Routledge.
- Thomas, Rosalind (1995). "Written in Stone? Liberty, Equality, Orality and the Codification of Law". Bulletin of the Institute of Classical Studies. 40: 59–74. doi:10.1111/j.2041-5370.1995.tb00464.x.
- van Effenterre, Henri; Demargne, J. (1937). "Recherches à Dréros, II: Les inscriptions archaïques". Bulletin de correspondance hellénique. 61.
- Whitley, James (1997). "Cretan Laws and Cretan Literacy". American Journal of Archaeology. 101 (4). doi:10.2307/506828. JSTOR 506828.
