= Anticlides =

3rd-century BC Greek historian

Anticlides of Athens (or Anticleides) (Ancient Greek: Ἀντικλείδης) was an ancient Greek historian who lived after the time of Alexander the Great,. He is estimated to have lived during the early 3rd century BCE, and is frequently referred to by later writers.

== Writings ==
At least four works may be attributed to him; whether these works were all written by Anticlides of Athens cannot be decided with certainty. None survive, except in scant quotations:

1. Peri Noston was an account of the return of the Greeks from their ancient expeditions. Anticlides' statement about the Pelasgians, which Strabo quotes, is probably taken from the work on the Nostoi.
2. Deliaca, about Delos
3. Exegeticus appears to have been a sort of Dictionary, in which perhaps an explanation of those words and phrases was given which occurred in the ancient stories.
4. On Alexander, of which the second book is quoted by Diogenes Laërtius.
5. (quoted by Strabo in Geography 5.2.4) noted that the Tyrrhenians (Etruscans) originally lived on Lemnos and Imbros before later sailing to Italy.
