= Sphyrelaton =

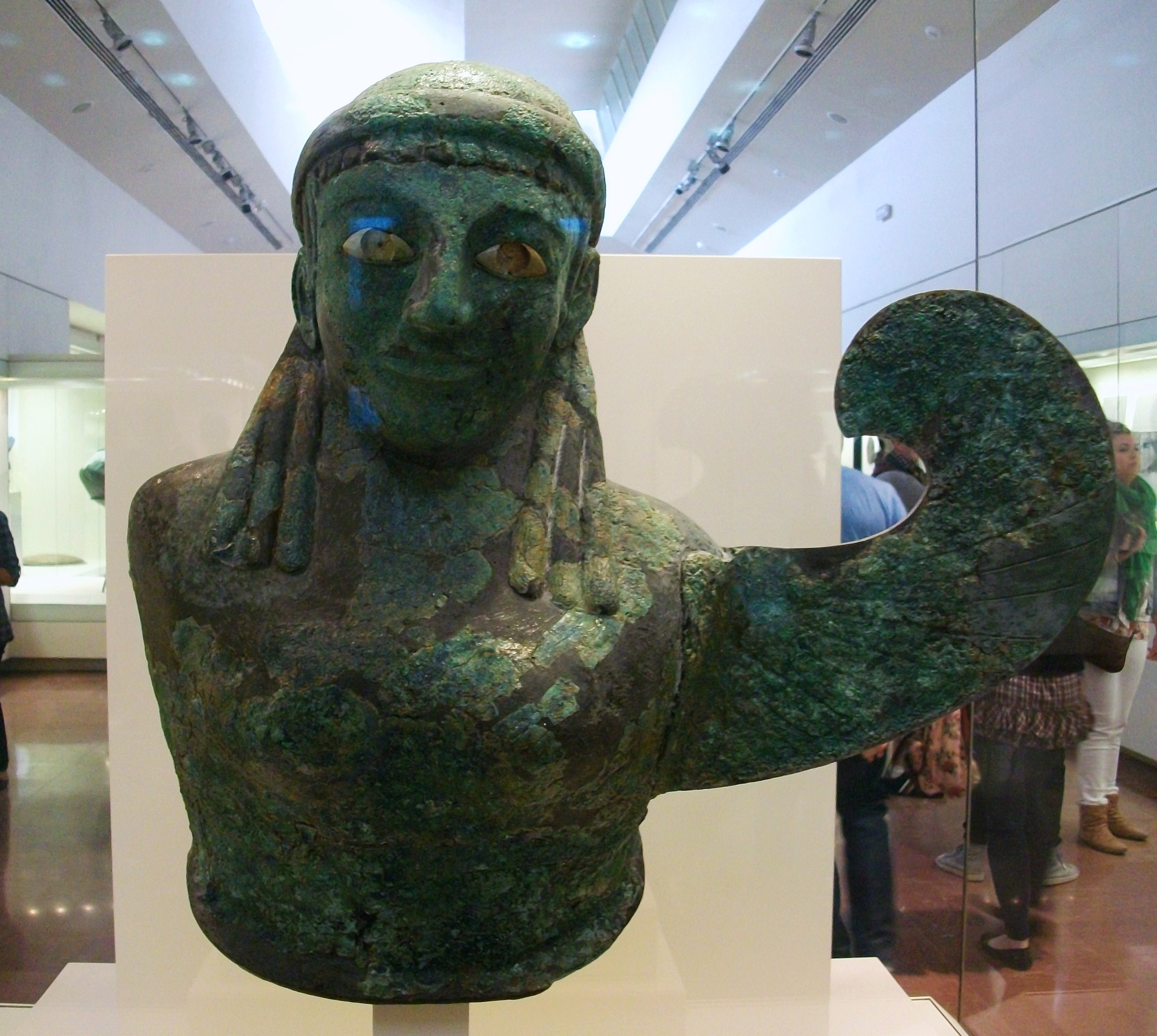
Bronze winged feminine figure, 590–580 BC. Archaeological Museum of Olympia

A sphyrelaton (Greek: σφυρήλατος for "hammer-elongated", plural: sphyrelata, σφυρήλατα) was a type of large archaic Greek bronze votive statues.

== Features ==
The sphyrelata were obtained by hammering a thin sheet of bronze around a core of wood previously carved up to take the desired shape. The technique seems to be of Oriental origin, probably imported from north-Syrian workers arrived in Greece around the seventh century BC. In ancient Greece the sphyrelaton type (along with many other inventions, such as the xoanon) were attributed to the mythical figure of Daedalus, and it is indeed significant that the most important testimonies of similar votive objects come from excavations on the island of Crete .

== Archaeological evidence ==
Archaeological evidence relating to sphyrelata is scarce. This kind of votive statues, in fact, was produced with materials that are highly perishable and delicate. The technique of realization of sphyrelata was not particularly long-lasting, as it was completely replaced by hollow casting (early sixth century BC), which was used to achieve superior standards of quality with less effort. The most substantial evidence, however, comes from Crete, where, e.g. in the Temple of Apollo Delphinios at Dreros three votive statuettes have been found in an excellent state of preservation, "in the first orientalizing style of the late eighth century" (the so-called Triad of Dreros, now in the Archaeological Museum of Heraklion). Two of the three sphyrelata are supposed to represent Artemis and Leto, as they are equipped with a polos, a long decorated garment and a mantle. The two are in static positions, while the third, which is hypothesized to depict Apollo, is in motion, and the position of the arm of god (leaning forward) suggests that it held a bow.

== Bibliography ==
- Borell, Brigitte; Rittig, Dessa (1998). Orientalische und griechische Bronzereliefs aus Olympia. Der Fundkomplex aus Brunnen 17. Olympische Forschungen. Vol. 26. Berlin/New York: Walter de Gruyter. pp. 187–195. ISBN 3-11-015091-3.
- John Griffiths Pedley, Greek Art and Archeology- Roma: Istituto Poligrafico e Zecca dello Stato, Libreria dello Stato, 2005 (400 p.: ill.;
