= Theognostus the Grammarian =

Theognostus the Grammarian (Ancient Greek: Θεόγνωστος ὁ Γραμματικός; Latin: Theognostus Grammaticus) was a Byzantine grammarian of the 9th century and the author of Περὶ ὀρθογραφίας (On Orthography), also known as the Κανόνες (Canons), a handbook on spelling. The work, which is based on the works of the earlier grammarians Cyril and Herodian, consists of a series of rules designed to help Byzantine writers use the correct ancient spellings of words whose pronunciation had changed in mediaeval Greek. It is dedicated to the emperor Leo V. Theognostus also wrote a lost work on the rebellion of Euphemius in Sicily in 826–827.
