= Rex E. Wallace =

American linguist and classical scholar (born 1952)

- Born: Rex Ervin Wallace; September 13, 1952 (age 74); United States
- Occupations: Linguist, classical scholar

Academic background
- Education: University of Nebraska–Lincoln (BA, MA); Ohio State University (PhD)

Academic work
- Discipline: Linguistics
- Sub-discipline: Etruscan language, epigraphy, historical linguistics
- Institutions: University of Massachusetts Amherst
- Main interests: Etruscan, Sabellic languages, Latin epigraphy
- Notable works: Zikh Rasna: A Manual of the Etruscan Language and Inscriptions (2008)

Rex E. Wallace (born September 13, 1952) is an American linguist and classical scholar specializing in the Etruscan language, the ancient languages of Italy, epigraphy, and historical linguistics. He is a professor emeritus of classics at the University of Massachusetts Amherst, where he served on the faculty from 1985 until his retirement in 2018.

== Biography ==
Rex Ervin Wallace completed his B.A. and M.A. at the University of Nebraska–Lincoln before earning his Ph.D. in linguistics from Ohio State University in 1984.

In 1990, Wallace was awarded the Rome Prize as the Oscar Broneer Fellow in Classical Studies at the American Academy in Rome. His research has focused on the paleography and linguistics of Pre-Roman Italy, with a significant emphasis on the inscriptions from the archaeological site of Poggio Civitate.

He was a co-founder and co-editor of Rasenna, a peer-reviewed electronic journal for Etruscan studies. In 2019, he was the dedicatee of a Festschrift, The Etruscans and the History of Dentistry, in recognition of his contributions to the field.

== Selected publications ==
- Res gestae divi Augusti: as recorded in the Monumentum Ancyranum and the Monumentum Antiochenum, 2000.
- An introduction to wall inscriptions from Pompeii and Herculaneum, Bolchazy-Carducci, 2005.
- The Sabellic Languages of Ancient Italy, Lincom Europa, 2007.
- Zikh Rasna: A Manual of Etruscan Language and Inscriptions, Beech Stave Press, 2008.
- The Archaeology of Language at Poggio Civitate (Murlo), 2013.
- The Etruscans and the History of Dentistry: Studies in Honor of Rex E. Wallace, ed. Marshall J. Becker and Jean MacIntosh Turfa, Beech Stave Press, 2019.
