= Pierre Demargne =

French historian and archaeologist

Pierre Demargne (French: [dəmaʁɲ]) (8 February 1903 – 13 December 2000) was a French historian and archaeologist.

== Biography ==
Pierre Demargne went to school at l'École normale supérieure, where he took and passed the agrégation de lettres exam.

He studied archaeology and became a professor at the University of Grenoble in 1933 before moving to the University of Strasburg in 1937.

During WWII he was a prisoner of war.

He conducted his first research in Anatolia, more specifically in the south coast of Turkey. In 1951, he initiated a series of archaeological excavations (financed by the French Ministry of Foreign and European Affairs) at the ancient capital of Lycia, Xanthos, which was occupied from the 7th century BCE by the Lycians, Greeks, Romans and Byzantines for more than a thousand years. His discoveries from Xanthos, including monumental and funeral architecture and inscriptions, were a decisive step in our understanding of ancient Lycian civilization today.

He became director of the Service of Ancient Architecture )Service d'architecture antique que le C.N.R.S.) in 1957.

Demargne continued his research and publications into old age. From 1969 to his death, he was a member of the Académie des Inscriptions et Belles-Lettres. Both he and his father Joseph were members of the French School at Athens.

Overall, Pierre Demargne was a man of letters; however, he was also a fieldworker and renowned scientific expert, who was respected by the scientific community around the world. The majority of his career took place during a pivotal period in archaeological methods: from traditional archaeology, which was inspired from ancient texts and the hopes of finding treasure; to the more literary and artistic approaches of archaeology of the 17th and 18th centuries, which was inherited from the cabinets of curiosities; the archaeology of Pierre Demargne's time was changing to ever-increasing modern methodologies and tools and also (as budgets decreased) to more systematic and rigorous field methods.

== Honours ==
He was created a Knight in the Royal Order of George I.

== Publications ==
- La Crète dédalique: études sur les origines d'une renaissance (1947)
- Naissance de l'art grec (1974; 1985).
