= Carlo De Simone (linguist) =

Italian linguist (1932–2023)

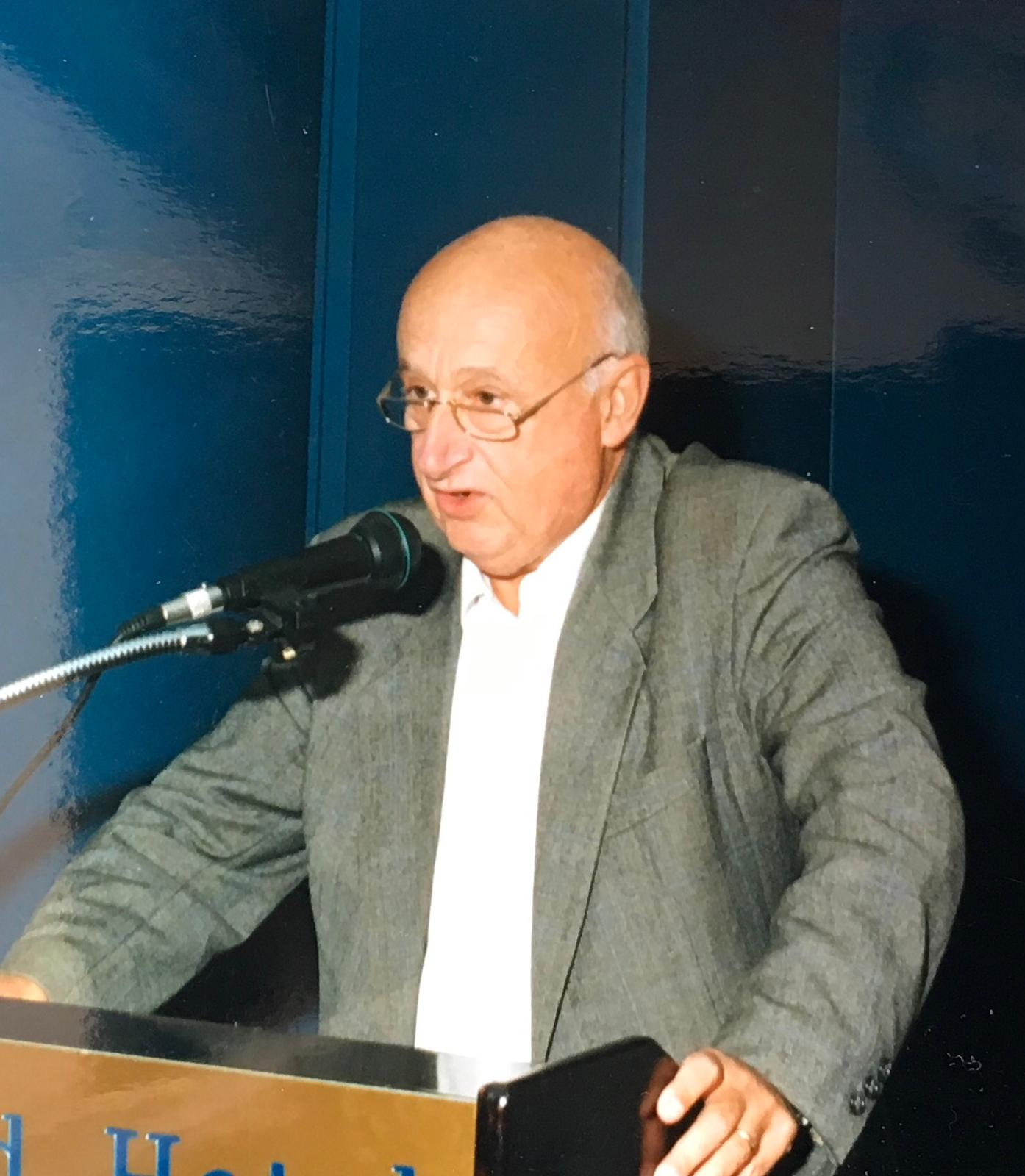
- Carlo De Simone
- Born: 22 November 1932; Rome, Italy
- Died: 14 September 2023 (aged 90); Rome, Italy

Academic background
- Education: University of Rome; University of Tübingen

Academic work
- Discipline: Linguist
- Sub-discipline: Etruscan language
- Institutions: University of Tübingen; University of Vienna; University of Perugia

Carlo De Simone (22 November 1932 – 14 September 2023) was an Italian linguist, specialising in Ancient Greek and Latin texts and Etruscan epigraphs. He is best known for his research into Etruscan, Lemnian and Rhaetian languages.

== Biography ==
De Simone studied comparative linguistics and archaeology at the University of Rome, where he was awarded a prize in 1955 with a thesis on the subject: "Le iscrizioni messapiche: cronologia e fonetismo". He obtained a scholarship to the University of Tübingen for the same discipline from the "Servizio di Scambio Accademico Tedesco" (DAAD) from 1955 to 1956, with Hans Krahe, for whom he was an assistant from 1961 to 1964.

In November 1964, he was appointed as a professor at the Faculty of Philosophy of the University of Tübingen, through his work on Greek contributions to the Etruscan language.

From 1972 to 1973, he held the chair of comparative linguistics at the University of Vienna, then, from 1975 to 1980, at the University of Perugia.

De Simone returned to Tübingen in 1980 and finished his career there in 1998. A festschrift in his honour was published in 2003, titled Linguistica è storia : scritti in onore di Carlo De Simone = Sprachwissenschaft ist Geschichte : festschrift für Carlo De Simone.

De Simone died in Rome on 14 September 2023, at the age of 90.

== Selected publications ==
- I morfemi etruschi '-ce' ('-ke') e '-che'. Studi Etruschi, XXXVIII (1970), p. 115-139.
- Il nome del Tevere. Contributo per la storia delle più antiche relazioni tra genti latino-italiche ed etrusche. Studi Etruschi, XLIII (1975), p. 119 sgg.
- Etuskischer Literaturbericht : neuveröffentlichte Inschriften 1970–1973 (mit Nachträgen). Glotta, LIII (1975), p. 125 sgg.
- " Die Göttin von Pyrgi : linguistische Probleme. " in H. Rix, Atti del Colloquio sul tema : Die Göttin von Pyrgi (Tübingen 1979), p.64 sgg. Firenze (1981).
- " La posizione linguistica della Daunia. " in Atti dell XIII Convegno di Studi Etruschi e Italici (Manfredonia 1980), p. 113 sgg. Firenze (1984).
- " Gli imprestiti etruschi nel latino arcaico. " in E. Campanile (a cura di), Alle origini di Roma. Atti del colloquio. Pisa (1988).
- " Etrusco Laucie Mezentie " in Miscellanea etrusca e italica in onore di M. Pallottino. Archeologia Classica, XLIII (1991), n. 1, p. 559 sgg.
- Sudpiceno Safino- / Lat. Sabino- : il nome dei Sabini. Annali dell'Istituto universitario orientale di Napoli. Dipartimento di Studi del mondo classico e del Mediterraneo antico. Sezione linguistica, XIV (1992), p. 223 sgg.
- I Tirreni a Lemnos. Evidenza linguistica e tradizioni storiche. Firenze (1996)
- " Il nome di Romolo " in Andrea Carandini e A. Cappelli (a cura di), Roma. Romolo, Remo e la fondazione della città. Milano (2000).
- " Il nome di Romolo e Remo " in Andrea Carandini (a cura di), La leggenda di Roma. Milano (2006).
- " La lamina di Demlfeld (with Simona Marchesini), Fabrizio Serra Editore, Pisa-Roma (2013).
