= Latins =

Various groups of people with links to Ancient Rome

The term Latin has been used to describe several groups of people throughout history, first referring to the inhabitants of the ancient Latium region, then to Catholic Christians of the Latin rite, and most recently to Romance-speaking peoples.

== Ancient Latins ==
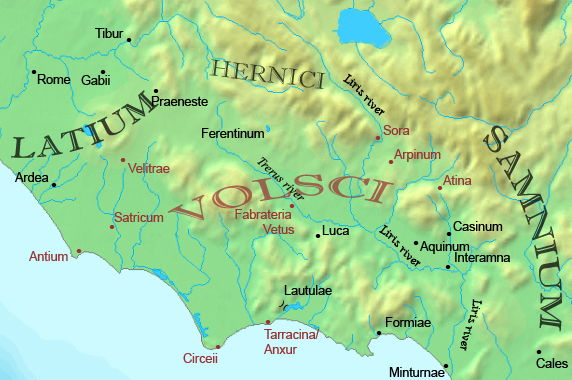
Map of 5th century-BC Latium (Latium Vetus) and surrounding regions in central Italy that were eventually annexed by Rome to form "New Latium". The Alban Hills, a region of early Latin settlement (from c. 1000 BC) and the site of the Latiar, the most important Latin communal festival, are located under the "U" in latium. The region's two main lakes, Nemi and Albanus, are visible under the "I". The leading Latin city-states of Rome, Tibur (Tivoli), Praeneste (Palestrina), Ardea and Gabii are shown.

The Latins were an ancient Italic people who inhabited in the region south of the Tiber river(Latium Vetus, "Old Latium"), in the 1st millennium BC. They emerged from the Urnfield and Tumulus groups, who spread across Italy during the late Bronze Age and early Iron Age. Their distinctive material culture, known as the Latial culture, constituted a subgroup of the proto-Villanovan culture, which emerged in certain areas of the Italian peninsula during the first half of the 12th century BC.

Although the Latins lived in independent city-states, they spoke Latin as a common language, held common religious beliefs, and extended common rights of residence and trade to one another. Collectively, these Latin states were known as the Latin League. A rupture between Rome, one of the Latin states, and the rest of the Latin League emerged as a result of the former's territorial ambitions. The Latin League fought against Rome in the Latin War (340–338 BC), which ended in a Roman victory. Consequently, some of the Latin states were incorporated within the Roman state, and their inhabitants were given full Roman citizenship. Others were permitted to retain a certain degree of political autonomy and to enjoy limited rights and privileges which could be exercised in dealings with Roman citizens, but only while in a subordinate status as socii ("allies") of the Romans, bound to Rome by treaties of military alliance. These privileges came to be known as ius latii ("Latin rights"). The ius Latii was given to "Latin colonies" which were founded around Italy in the fourth and third centuries BC to strengthen Roman control, as Rome expanded its hegemony over the peninsula.

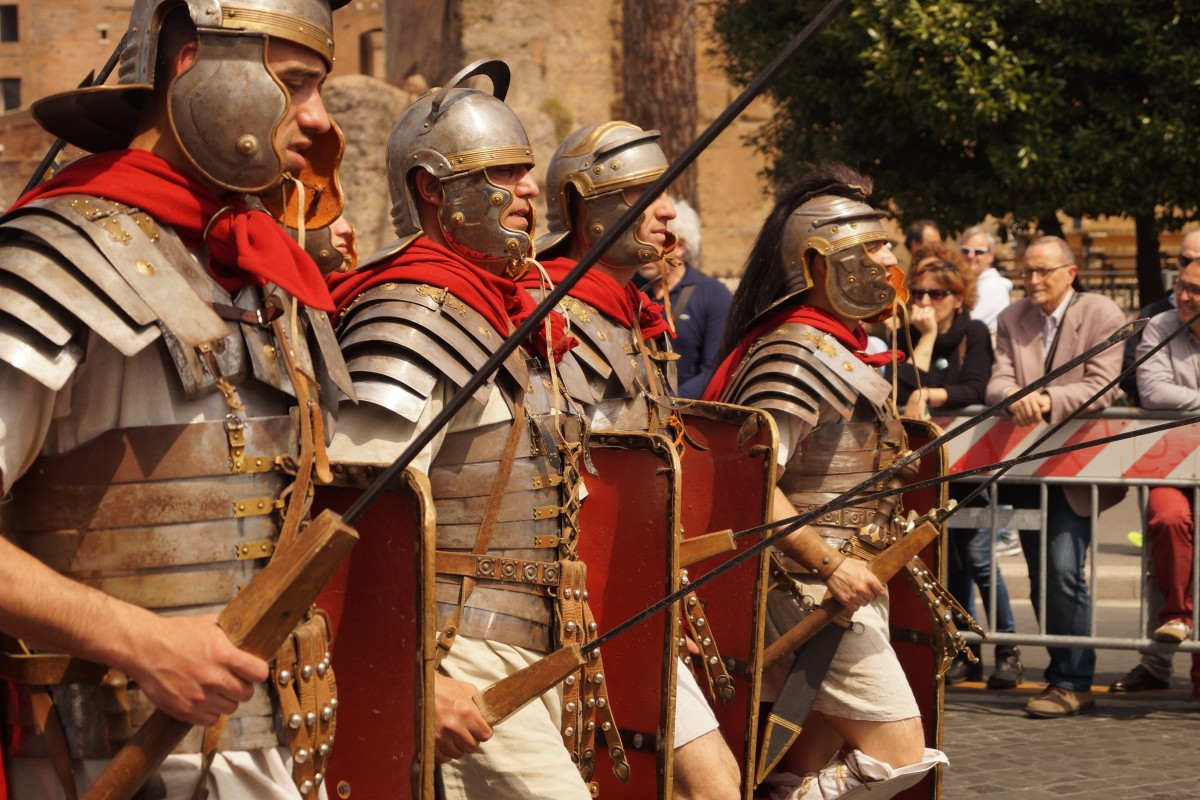
Depiction of Roman legionnaires

With Roman expansion beyond Italy, Latin colonies were also founded outside Italy, e. g. Carteia (contemporary San Roque), which was founded in Hispania in 171 BC and was the first Latin colony outside of Italy. In 122 BC, the plebeian tribune Gaius Gracchus introduced a law which extended the ius Latii to all other residents of Italy. This reflected the increasing ties between Rome and the Italic peoples through trade and the ties between the leading families in the Italian towns and patrician families in Rome. After the Social War (91–87 BC), when the rest of the Latins received full Roman citizenship, "Latin" ceased to be an ethnolinguistic term and became a purely juridical category, ius latii ("Latin rights").

The Roman Empire would go on to dominate the Mediterranean region for the next several centuries, spreading the Latin language and Roman culture. The Latin-speaking Western Roman Empire ended in AD 476, while the Greek-speaking eastern half survived on until 1453.

== As a religious designation ==
=== Middle Ages ===
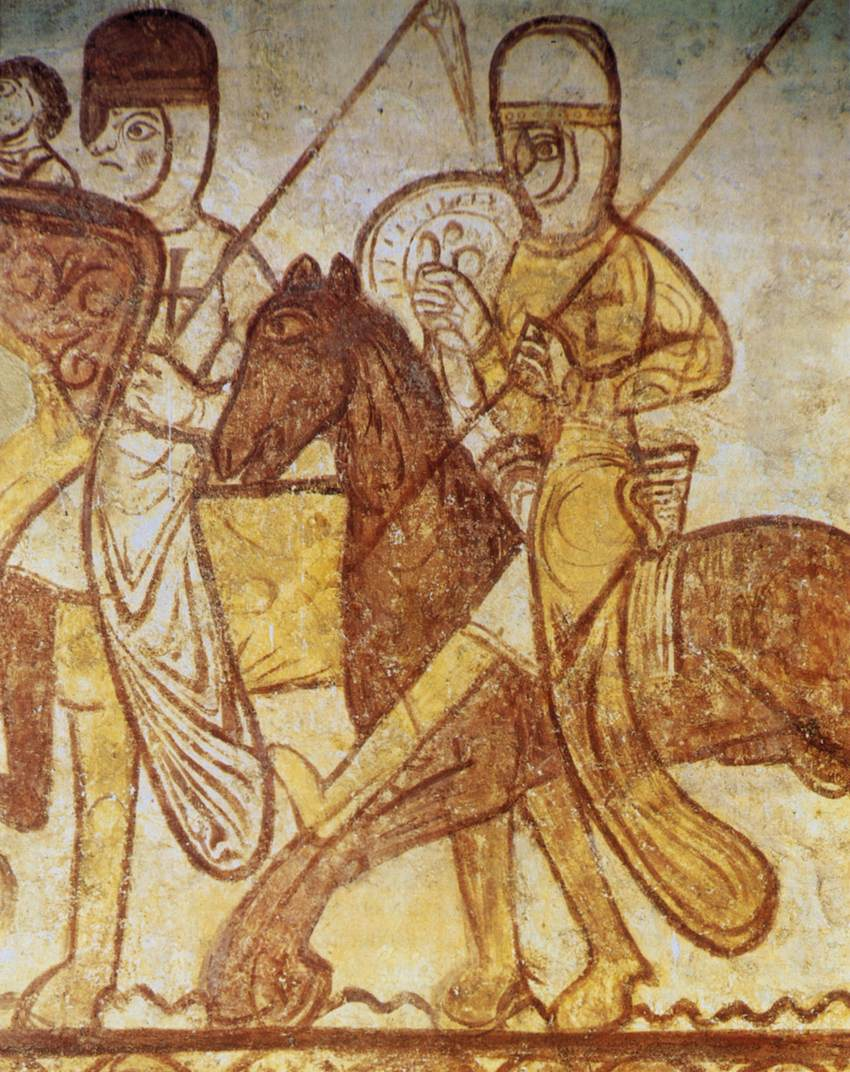
12th century depiction of Latin Crusaders

In the Eastern Roman Empire, and the broader Greek Orthodox world, Latins was a synonym for all people who followed the Roman Catholicism of Western Christianity, regardless of ethnicity. The term was related to the predominance of the Latin Church, which is the largest autonomous particular church within the broader Catholic Church, and took its name from its origins in the Latin-speaking world which had Rome as its center.

Latin was generally a negative characterization, especially after the 1054 schism. The term is still used by the Orthodox church communities, but only in a theological context. Nonetheless, it did not share this negative connotation in the West, where many self-identified with the term, such as Petrarch, when he states "Sumus enim non greci, non barbari, sed itali et latini." ("We are not Greeks or barbarians; we are Italians and Latins.").

=== Present day ===
Latins are a constitutionally recognized minority in Cyprus. Hugh Foot, the last British governor of the island, revived the term in 1960 to distinguish them from the Maronite Cypriots, who are also Catholics. Other Catholics under the Latin Patriarchate of Jerusalem have also been referred to as Latins.

== Latin peoples and regions ==
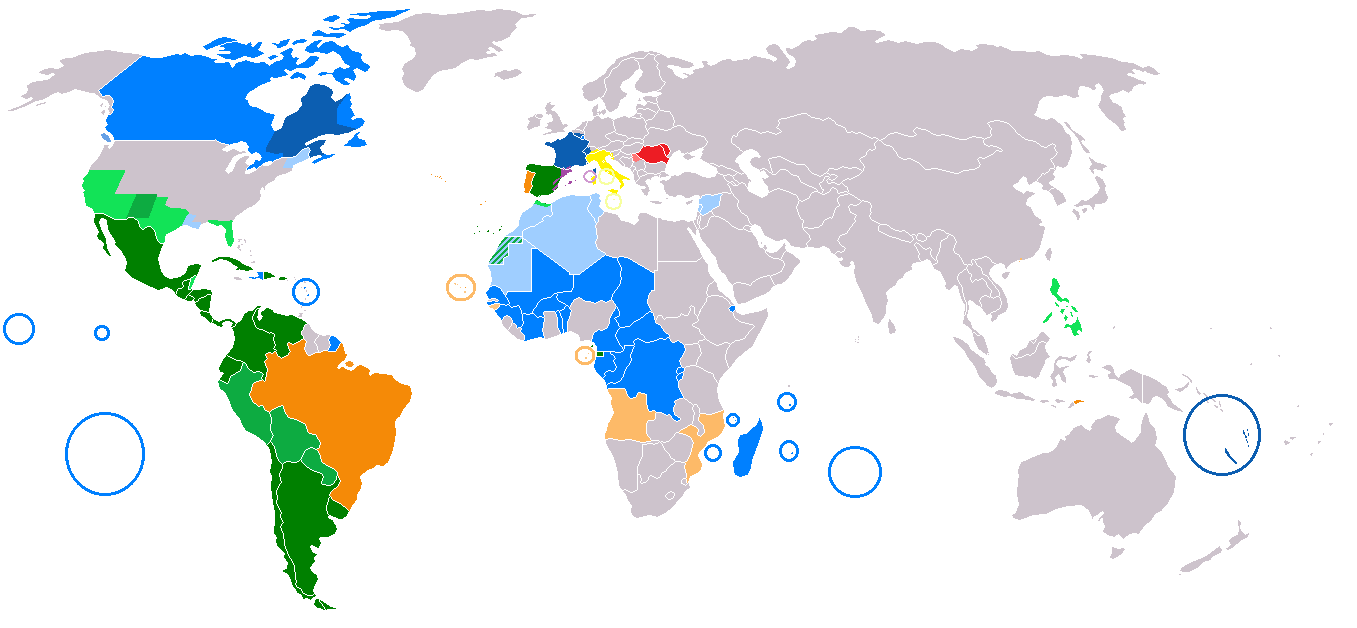
Distribution of the most spoken Romance languages at the beginning of the 21st century: Spanish (dark green and light green), French (blue and light blue), Italian (yellow), Portuguese (orange), Romanian (red), and Catalan (purple).

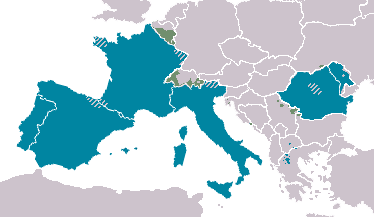
Map of Latin Europe: territories where a Romance language is the national language are shown in blue, and territories where a Romance language is one of the official languages are shown in green.

=== Europe and the Americas ===
In the present day, Latin can be an ethnically-related designation that denotes a member of the Latin (Romance-speaking) peoples (Note: Alternatively called the "Romance peoples" or "Romanic peoples".)– including, and often specifically, Latin Americans.

The related term Latin Europe is sometimes used in reference to European countries and/or regions inhabited by Romance-speaking people. Within that framework, Latin peoples include Italians, French, Spaniards, Catalans, Provençals, Portuguese, Romansh, and Walloons in Western Europe, and Romanians and Vlachs in Eastern Europe. The Latin designation is also specifically present in the names of two Romance-speaking groups: the Ladin people of northern Italy and the Ladino people of Central America.

Historian Ioan-Aurel Pop describes the origin of Latin European ethnic groups as resulting from a "double assimilation process" that began with the territorial expansion of the ancient Romans. First, pre-Roman and indigenous peoples were Romanized, and later, Romanized populations incorporated "migratory elements" during late antiquity. While the use of Latin to denote a non-ethnolinguistic Western Catholic identity predominated in the medieval period, in 1368 Petrarch referenced a "Latin nation" that included the Italians and the French in a letter to Pope Urban V. In 1458, Pope Pius II used the term genus Italicum (English: Italian race) in his work De Europa (English: Concerning Europe) to group together Italians and Romanians.

By the 19th century, Romance-speaking groups were being collectively classified as Latin peoples, a category that was considered one of the three major ethnolinguistic groupings of Europe, along with the Germanic and Slavic peoples. These are generally Catholic peoples (with the exception of the Romanians and Moldovans, which are in their majority Orthodox) that, by virtue of their Roman heritage, exhibit cultural characteristics distinct from the peoples of Germanic and Slavic Europe. This period also gave rise to pan-Latinism, which advocates for the unification of, or solidarity among, Latin peoples. One variant of the ideology held the imperialist idea that Latin peoples should rule over non-Latins, while another variant instead favored a democratic Latin confederation. In 1927, The New York Times reported on "the incipient Pan-Latin movement" and defined "Latinity" as consisting of Latin populations from both Europe and the Americas, regardless of genetics.

=== Africa ===
Many of the present-day independent states of Africa have main official languages that are Romance, as a result of colonization by Romance-speaking European countries in the 19th century. The French political theorist Gabriel Hanotaux claimed that the Latin peoples were as capable of practicing modern imperialism as other groups and had an important role to play in the colonization of Africa.

Barthélémy Boganda, a politician of the Central African Republic, proposed a "United States of Latin Africa" in 1957 that would serve as a federation of the Romance-speaking countries in the region of Central Africa; this never came to fruition. African-American author Richard Wright, who criticized the proposal, said that "Latin Africa" correlated with "Catholic Africa" and would create an unnecessary religious division against the English-speaking "Protestant Africa".

== See also ==
- Latin Valley
- Greek East and Latin West
- Roman people
- Romanization (cultural)
- Romanitas
- Latin Church in the Middle East
- Latin Union
