= Minoan language =

Language of ancient Minoans written in Cretan hieroglyphs and Linear A syllabary

Minoan
- (undeciphered)
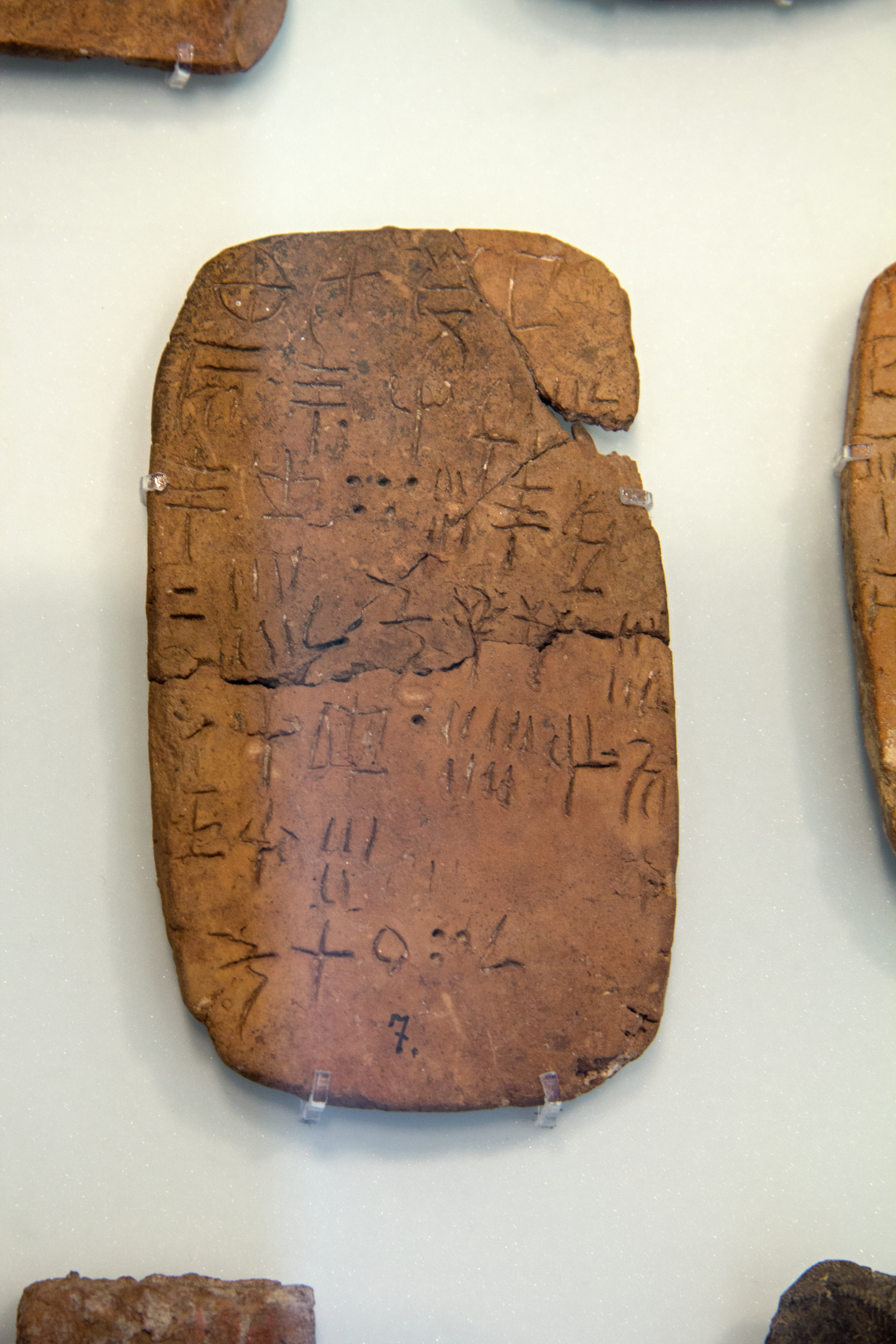
- Linear A tablet
- Region: Crete
- Era: About 2100–1450 BC
- Language family: unclassified
- Writing system: Cretan hieroglyphs, Linear A

Language codes
- ISO 639-3: Either: omn – Minoan lab – Linear A
- Glottolog: mino1236 Minoan

The Minoan language is the language (or languages) of the ancient Minoan civilization of Crete written in the Cretan hieroglyphs and later in the Linear A syllabary. As the Cretan hieroglyphs are undeciphered and Linear A only partly deciphered, the Minoan language is unknown and unclassified. With the existing evidence, it is even impossible to be certain that the two scripts record the same language.

The Eteocretan language, attested in a few alphabetic inscriptions from Crete 1,000 years later, is possibly a descendant of Minoan, but is also unclassified.

Minoan is mainly known from the inscriptions in Linear A, which are fairly legible on the assumption that many characters carried over into Linear B. The Cretan hieroglyphs are dated from the first half of the 2nd millennium BC. The Linear A texts, mostly written in clay tablets, are spread all over Crete with more than 40 localities on the island.

== Classification ==
The Minoan language does not appear to be a close relative of any known language and it is not entirely certain that all Linear A texts are in the same language. Some scholars have explored potential parallels with Anatolian languages such as Luwian and Lycian, as well as with Semitic languages such as Phoenician and Ugaritic. However, even if these connections are not coincidental, it would be unclear whether Minoan is related to one of these languages or if the parallels arose through language contact.

== Phonology ==
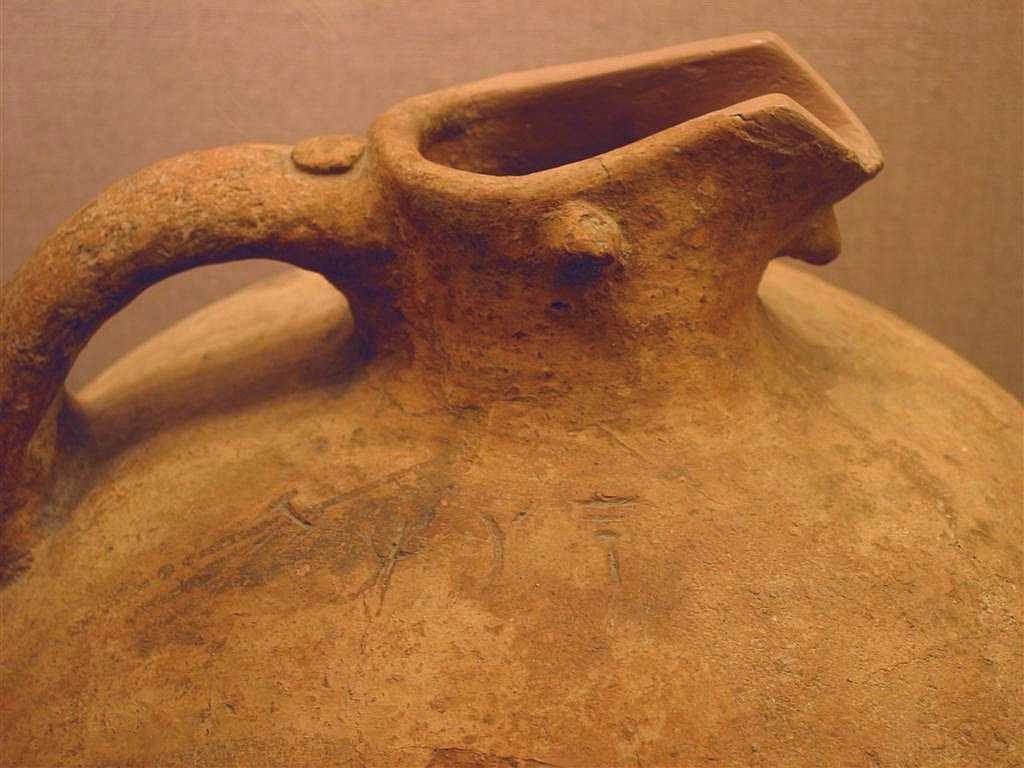
Linear A incised on a jug, also found in Akrotiri

Although an approximate phoneme inventory for Minoan can be inferred from the Linear A sign inventory, the phonology of the language has been subject to debate, and one scholar refers to its reconstruction as "the thirteenth Labour of Herakles". In older work, Minoan was often regarded as having a three vowel system, since Linear A shares Linear B's /i/, /u/, and /a/ series, but not all of the /o/ and /e/ signs, and thus it does occur much less frequently. However, more recent work has questioned this assumption, noting that Linear A sound values involving /o/ and /e/ are supported by comparative evidence from Cypriot and also from their occurrence in shared placenames such as Pa-i-to and Se-to-i-ja.

Similarly, in older work, Minoan was assumed to have a predominantly open syllable structure and few consonant clusters, reflecting the inventory of syllables available in Linear A. This view was based on the assumption that Linear A would have been developed in order to closely match Minoan phonology, and that the defectiveness of Linear B would have resulted from the process of adapting the script to write Greek. However, more recent work has questioned this assumption based on precedents from other defective scripts as well as potential evidence of partial or plene spelling in Linear A itself, such as the placename 𐘂𐘚𐘄 (PA-I-TO) which would likely have contained an unwritten /s/ sound as in its later pronunciation as "Phaistos".

== Morphosyntax ==
By identifying systematic patterns of similarities and variations across inscriptions, scholars have been able to make inferences about the syntax and morphology of the Minoan language. Comparison of formulaic inscriptions on libation vessels suggests that the language had Verb Subject Object word order. Minoan appears to have been an agglutinative language, making copious use of prefixes and suffixes. Among these, the suffixes -RU and -RE appear to be case markers, while J- is a prefix meaning something like "from" or "of", and -JA appears to be a derivational suffix used to form adjectives.

== Vocabulary ==
Internal analysis of texts has been used to identify approximate meanings of certain words. Among these, the most secure is the word 𐙂𐘘 (KU-RO) meaning "total". The meaning of this word was inferred much as 𐀵𐀰/𐀵𐀭 (to-so/to-sa) was for Linear B, from the fact that it regularly occurs at the ends of tallied lists, preceding a numeral representing the sum of the tallies in the list. Similarly, the word stem 𐘚𐝥 (I-*301) is believed to mean "to give" or "to dedicate" based on its use across variants of the Libation Formula. In some cases, additional inferences can be made based on parallels between internal evidence from Linear A and loanwords in later Greek. For instance, the Linear A logogram for wool 𐛢 is a composite of the syllabic signs 𐙁 (MA) and 𐘘 (RU), a fact which on its own would suggest "maru" or "malu" as a potential Minoan word for wool. This inference is regarded as more secure because this term seems to appear as a loanword in Greek as μαλλός (mallos). Moreover, the same sign appears in Linear B, though it is sometimes written as a composite of 𐀔 ("ma") and 𐀫 ("ro") instead, seemingly reflecting an adaptation of the word to Greek phonology.

== Suggested link of Keftiu texts to Minoan language ==
From the Eighteenth Dynasty of Egypt come four texts containing names and spells in the language of Keftiu. They are, as usual in non-Egyptian texts, written in Egyptian hieroglyphs, which has allowed the pronunciation of those names and spells to be reconstructed.

- Magic Papyrus Harris (Latin: Papyrus magicus Harris XII, 1–5); Beg. 18th Dynasty: a spell in the Keftiu language
- Writing board (B.M. 5647); early 18th Dynasty: school blackboard with Keftiu names
- London Medical Papyrus (B.M., 10059); end of the 18th Dynasty: Two Spells Against Disease (#32–33)
- Aegean placard list: some Cretan place names.

Analysis of these texts has suggested that the Keftiu language had Object–verb–subject (OVS) word order. The phonetic system of the Keftiu language has also been reconstructed as having the following consonants:

Consonant phonemes
	Labial	Dental	Alveolar	Palatal	Velar	Uvular	Glottal
Nasal	m		n				
Stop	p b	t d	ts		k	q	
Fricative	f		s	ʃ			h
Trill			r				
Approximant				j	w		
