= Herzsee (Tyrol) =

- Location within Tyrol, Austria
- Location: Highlands above Innsbruck, Tyrol
- Coordinates: 47°15′N 11°26′E
- Type: Lake for fishery
- Primary outflows: Herztalbach
- Basin countries: Austria
- Max. length: 200 m (660 ft)
- Max. width: 50 m (160 ft)
- Surface area: 0.031 km^{2} (0.012 sq mi)
- Surface elevation: 760.51 m (2,495.1 ft)
- Settlements: Aldrans

The Herzsee is a lake near the village center of Aldrans in the Tyrol region of Austria, and serves mainly for fish breeding. Formerly the Lake was opened to the public for swimming. The lake is covered in a wooded environment on a round travel route to Ampass or Sistrans. Its length is 200 m; its width is 50 m.

Due to its small size, the lake is sometimes plagued by algae. Its water quality is Grade B. The Herztalbach is the natural outflow of the Lake and discharges into the Inn River after 5 km.

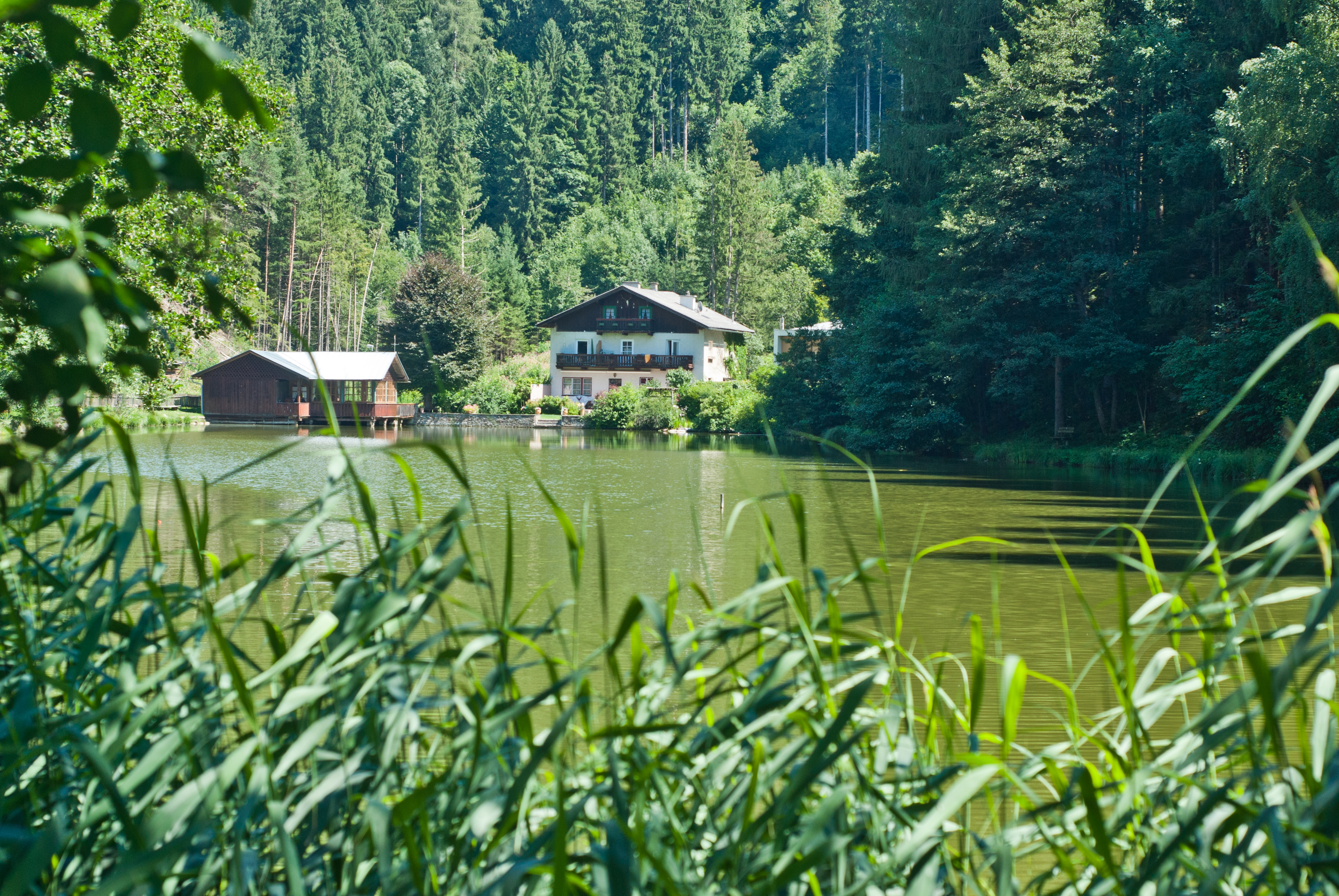
The Herzsee seen from west
