= Fritzens-Sanzeno culture =

- Geographical range: North Italy, Austria, Switzerland
- Period: Iron Age
- Dates: c. 500 BC – 15 BC
- Preceded by: Laugen-Melaun culture, Inntal culture, Urnfield culture
- Followed by: Roman Empire

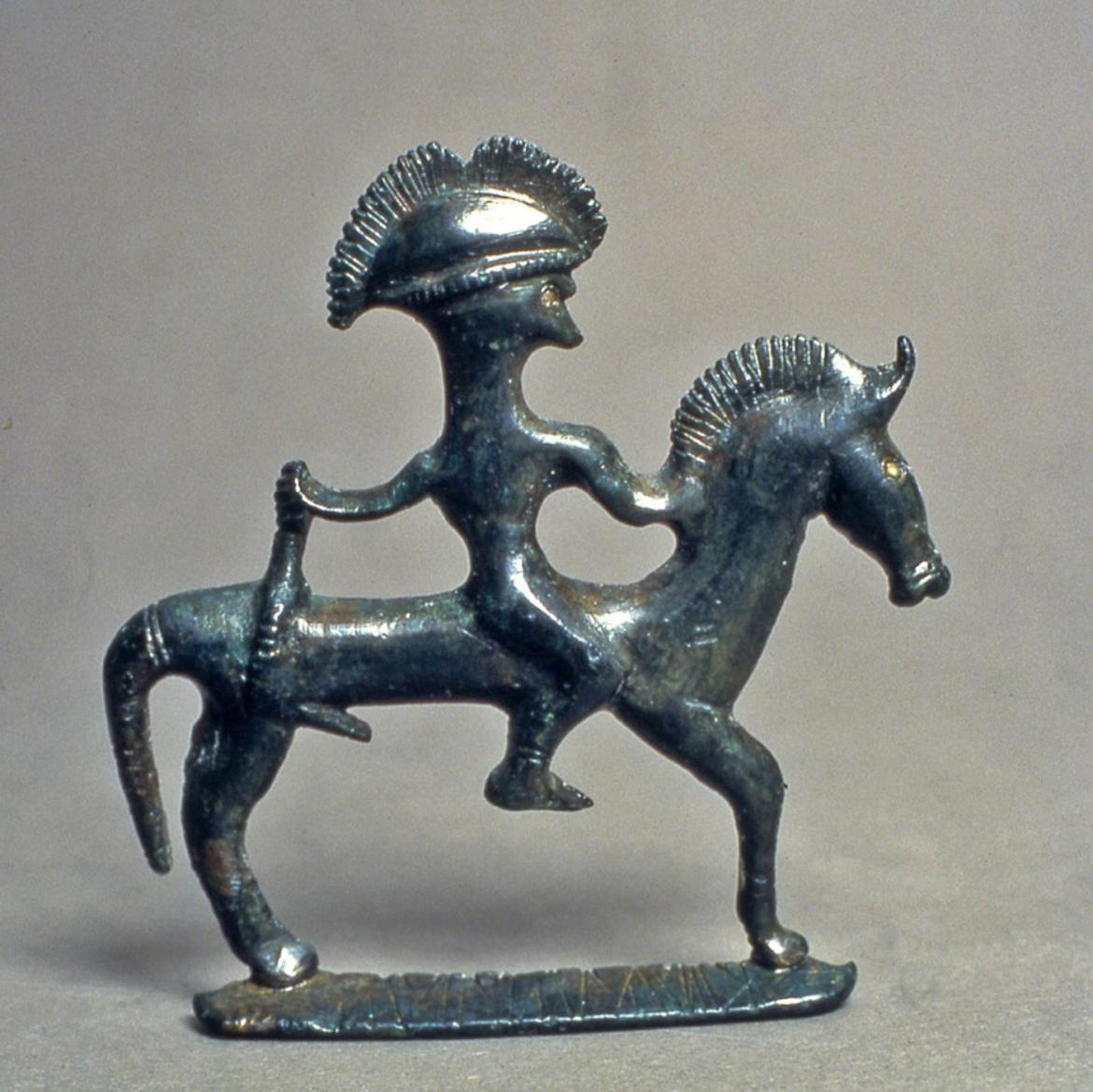
Rider of Sanzeno

The Fritzens-Sanzeno culture is an archaeological culture attested in the second Iron Age, from ca. 500 BC until the end of the first century BC, in the Alpine region of Trentino and South Tyrol; in the period of maximum expansion it also reached the Engadin region to the west and East Tyrol. It takes its name from the two towns of Fritzens (Austria) and Sanzeno (Trentino), where important archaeological excavations were carried out at the beginning of the 20th century.

The Fritzens-Sanzeno culture replaced the Laugen-Melaun culture in South Tyrol and Trentino and the Inntal culture (associated with the Urnfield and Hallstatt cultures) in the Austrian Tyrol, merging the two cultures together. It also had some impact on East Tyrol. The culture has been identified with the Raeti, and it ceased to exist in the period following the conquest of the Alps by Augustus in 15 BC, which also marks the end of the Iron Age in the region.

== Assemblage ==
The artefacts, burial customs, and religion of the Fritzens-Sanzeno culture, associated with the Raeti people, were strongly influenced by their neighbours, the Veneti, Etruscans, and Celts, but there are a number of distinguishing features, such as the style of housing (casa retica) and some aspects of the material culture. These include some typical pottery forms, like the stamped Fritzner / Sanzeno bowls ( Fritzner or Sanzenoschale) and the alpine Leistenkeramik. In the 4th century BC, Celtic weapons were adopted. Numerous Rhaetic language inscriptions have been found, written in the Sanzeno alphabet and dating from the 5th century onwards. The fibulae are the Celtic-inspired "mandolin fibula" and a series of other forms conforming to early and middle La Tène types. Modifications of Celtic disc neck-rings (Scheibenhalsringe) are found in both the northern and southern parts of the culture. Their high point coincides closely with that of the oppidum culture in Bavaria. From the Middle La Tène period onwards, graphite pottery, glass jewellery, and occasionally bronze jewellery were imported from the Celtic regions. The jewellery in particular might indicate marriage alliances. Fritzens-Sanzeno culture disappears abruptly following the Alpine campaign of Drusus and Tiberius in 15 BC.

== Extent ==
Key sites of the Fritzens-Sanzeno culture.
1 Fritzens
2 Sanzeno
3 Ganglegg
4 Tartscher Bichl
5 Rungger Egg
6 Brizen-Stufels
7 Stadlhof
8 Mortizing
9 Kundl
10 Egerndorfer Feld
11 Bergisel
12 Goldbichl
13 Pfaffenhofen-Hörtenberg
14 Himmelreich, Volders
15 Sanctuary at Demlfeld
16 Aldrans & Egerdach
17 Pillerhöhe
18 Spielleitenköpfl

The area of the Fritzens-Sanzeno culture covers Trentino, South Tyrol, most of North Tyrol, part of the lower Engadin valley, and East Tyrol.

The most important excavations for the culture in the area south of the Alps are: Sanzeno in the Non Valley (Trentino), the settlements at Ganglegg and Tartscher Bichl (Vinschgau, South Tyrol), the Rungger Egg in Seis am Schlern, and Brizen-Stufels (Eisacktal), as well as the grave fields at Stadlhof in Vadena and Mortizing in the South Tyrolean Unterland. In the north, the key sites are: the grave fields at Kundl and Egerndorfer Feld (both in the Lower Inn Valley), the settlements at Bergisel, Goldbichl, and Pfaffenhofen-Hörtenberg (all near Innsbruck), as well as Pirchboden in Fritzens, and Himmelreich in Volders.

The best known and published religious sites are the Sanctuary at Demlfeld in Ampass, the offering place at Aldrans-Innsbruck, Egerdach, the sanctuary at Pillerhöhe in the Upper Inn Valley, and the Himmelreich terrace in Volders (a site for burnt offerings). South of the Alps, there are also religious sites at Rungger Egg and Hahnehütter Bödele near Ganglegg. On the margins of the Fritzens-Sanzeno culture is the well-known burnt offering site at Spielleitenköpfl in Farchant near Garmisch-Partenkirchen in Bavaria.

Objects from the Fritzens-Sanzeno culture, mainly fibulae and pottery have also been found in southern Bavaria at the oppidum of Manching, Dürrnberg at Hallein, and in Lower Austria at Mannersdorf am Leithagebirge.

== History of research ==
The first finds to be associated with the Fritzens-Sanzeno culture were discovered in Fritzens in the Inn river valley in 1920 by Karl Stainer, the local doctor for the neighbouring village of Wattens. In 1924, he presented his finds at the 88th Congress of German Natural Scientists and Doctors, but little notice was taken of them. Subsequently, he published his observations in the archaeological journal Fundberichten aus Österreich (Vol. I, pp. 136, 192; II. pp. 47, 102, 177, 187; III [1948], p. 154). He also combed the soil layer of Himmelreich field in Volders (located opposite Fritzens in the Inn valley) and collected a large number of finds from the late Iron Age and Roman Imperial period over a number of years. This was an important site for making burnt offerings, a fact that was not realised at the time. The finds were noted briefly by Gero von Merhart and then published fully in the 1950s by Leonhard Franz. The pottery from Fritzens and other findspots in Tyrol were named the "Fritzener type". In 1955, Benedikt Frei was the first person to speak of a "Fritzens and Sanzeno-pottery horizon" and he was able to separate it from the older "Melaun horizon." This pottery has proven the most important find group for archaeologists' assessments of the Fritzens-Sanzeno culture, showing that it formed both north and south of the Alps in the decades around 500 BC.

== Gallery ==
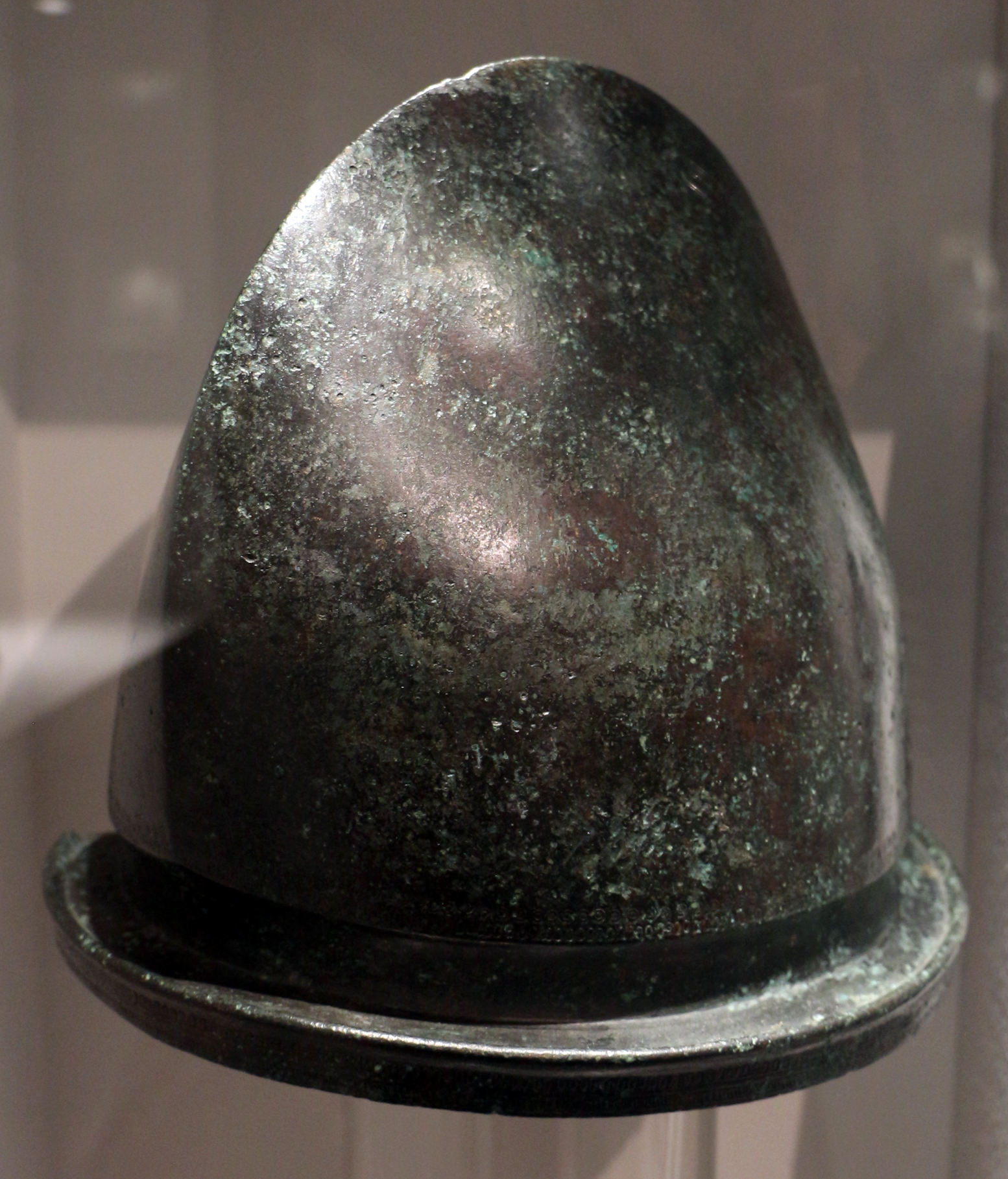
Helmet

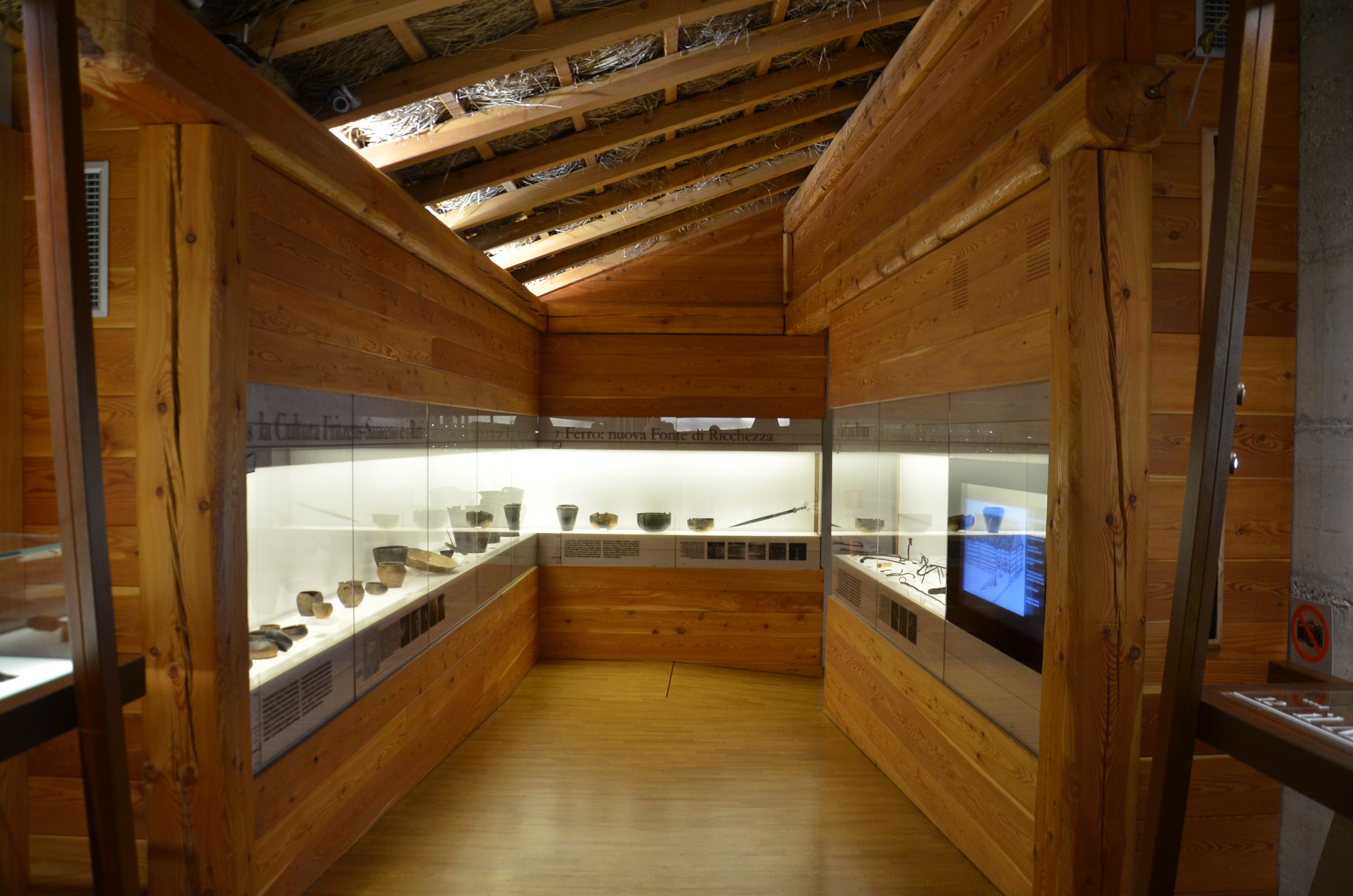
Museum display

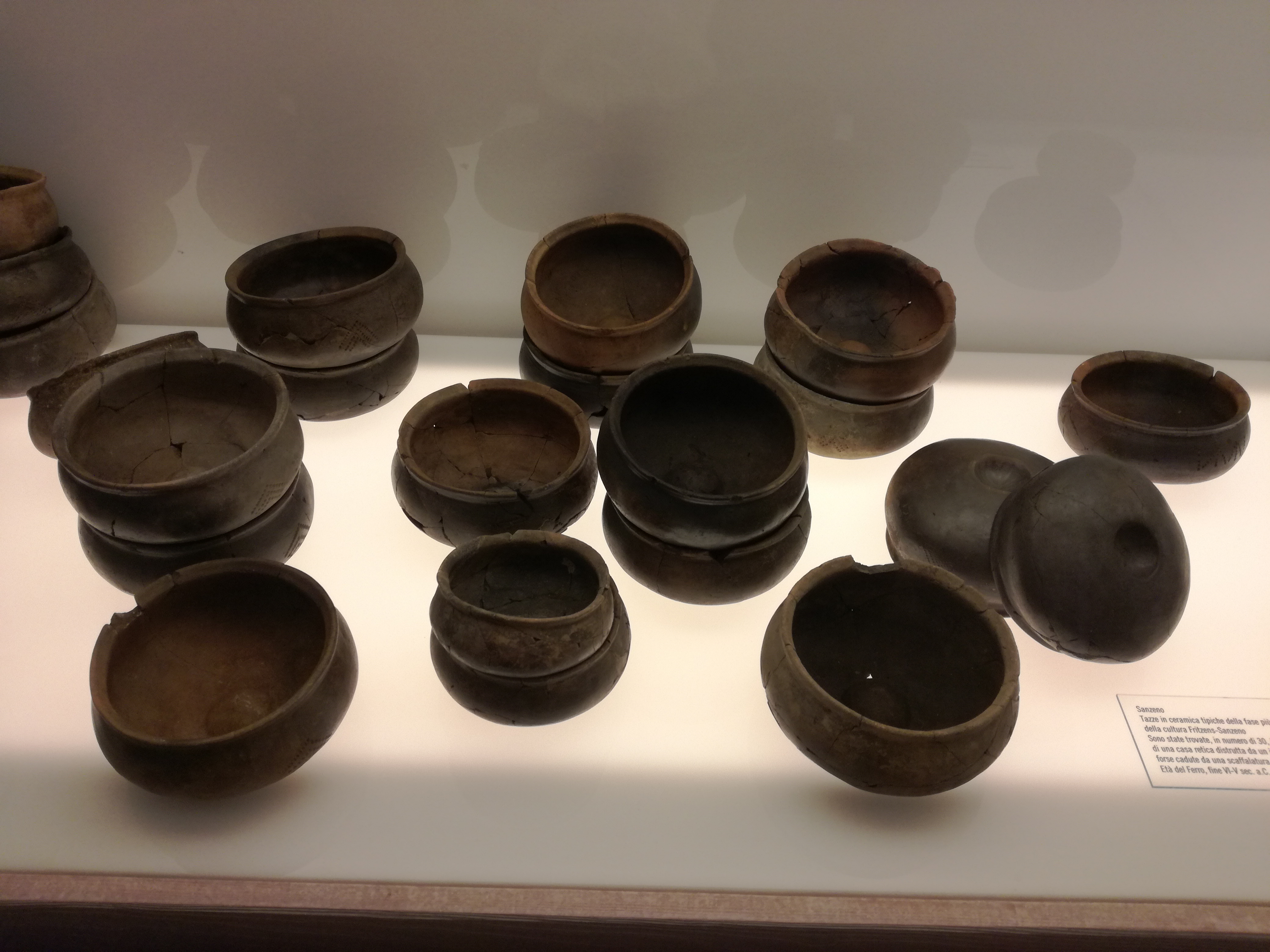
Fritzens-Sanzeno pottery

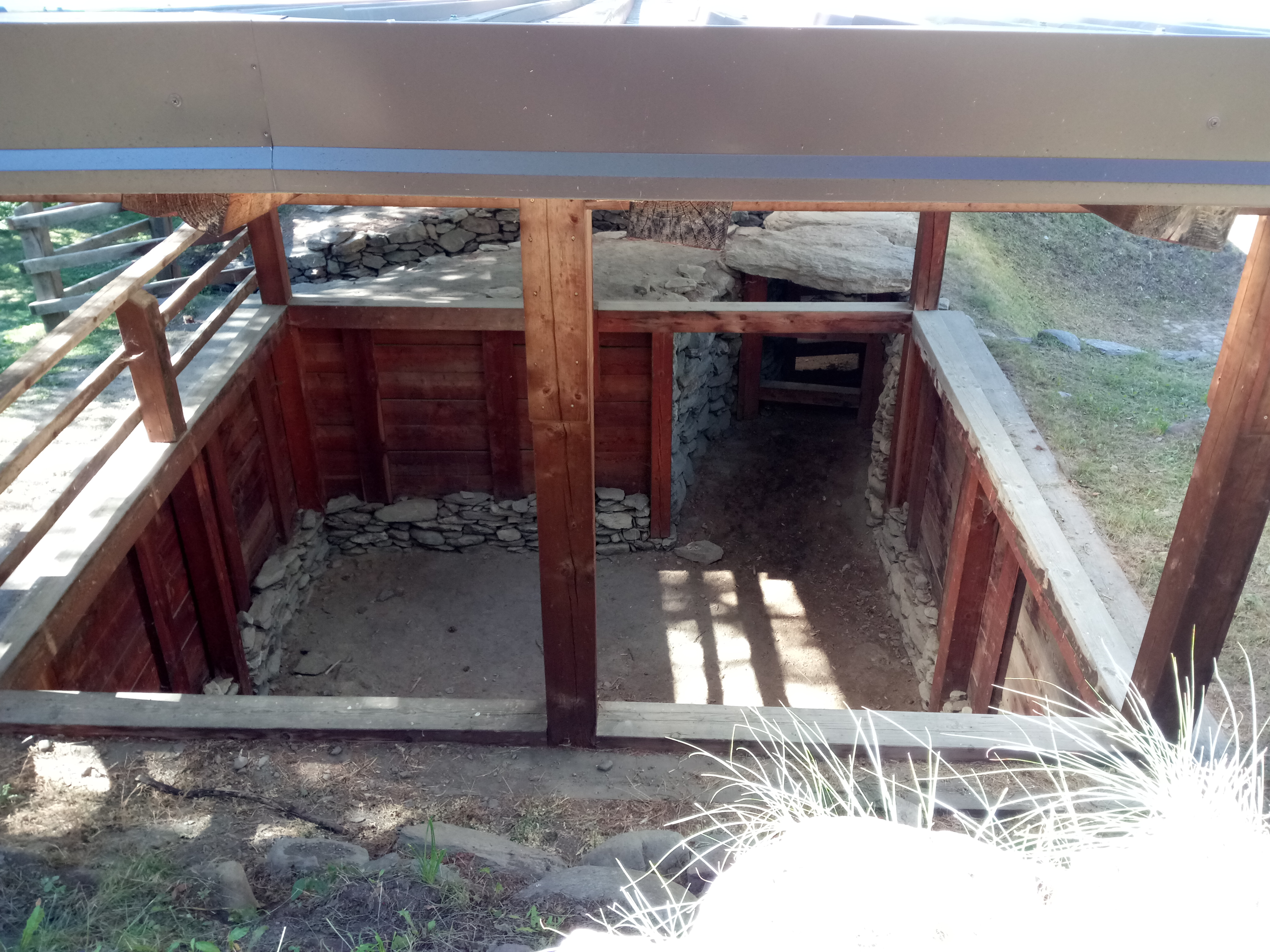
Partial reconstruction of a house at Ganglegg, Italy

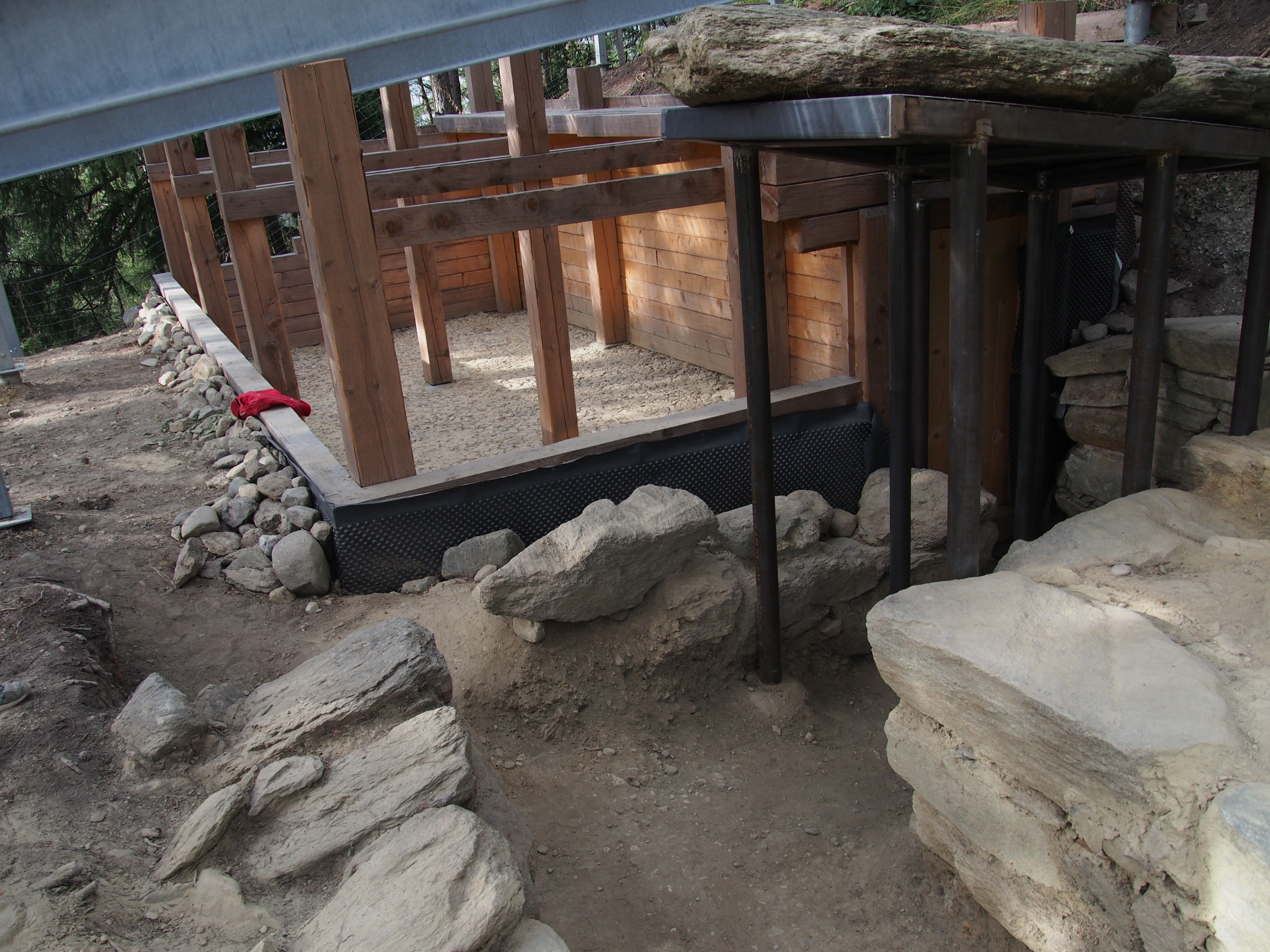

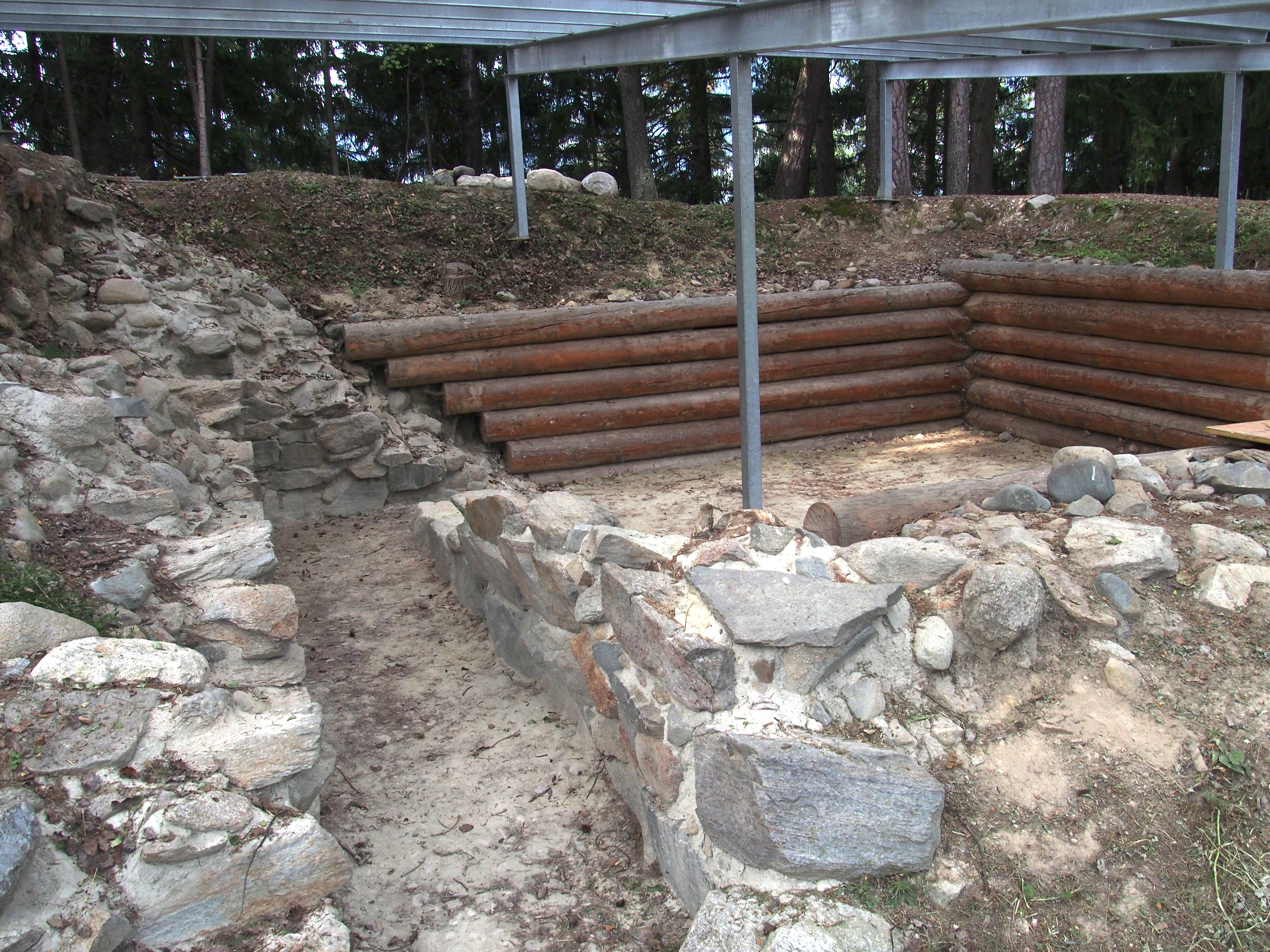

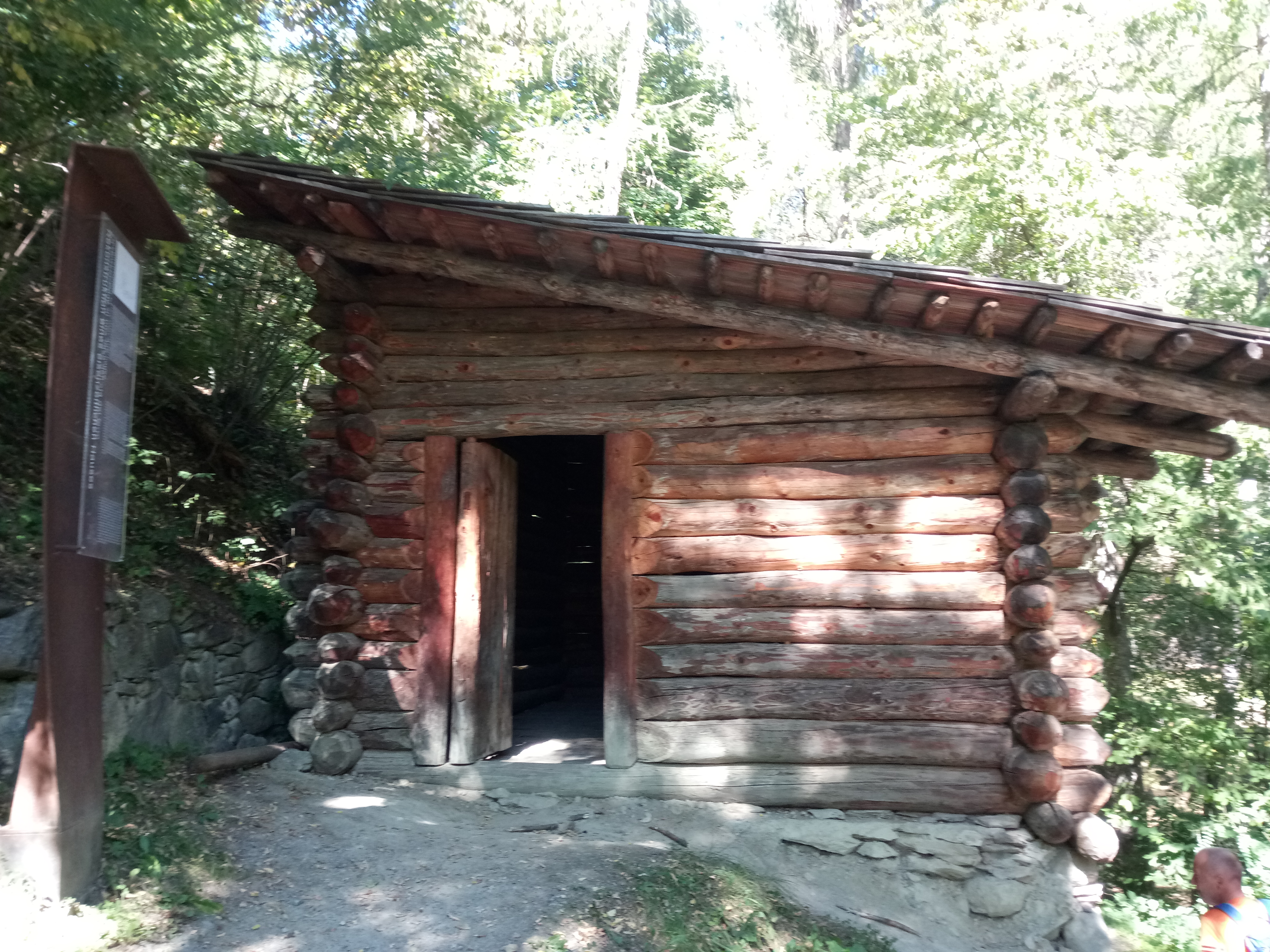
Reconstruction of a building at Ganglegg

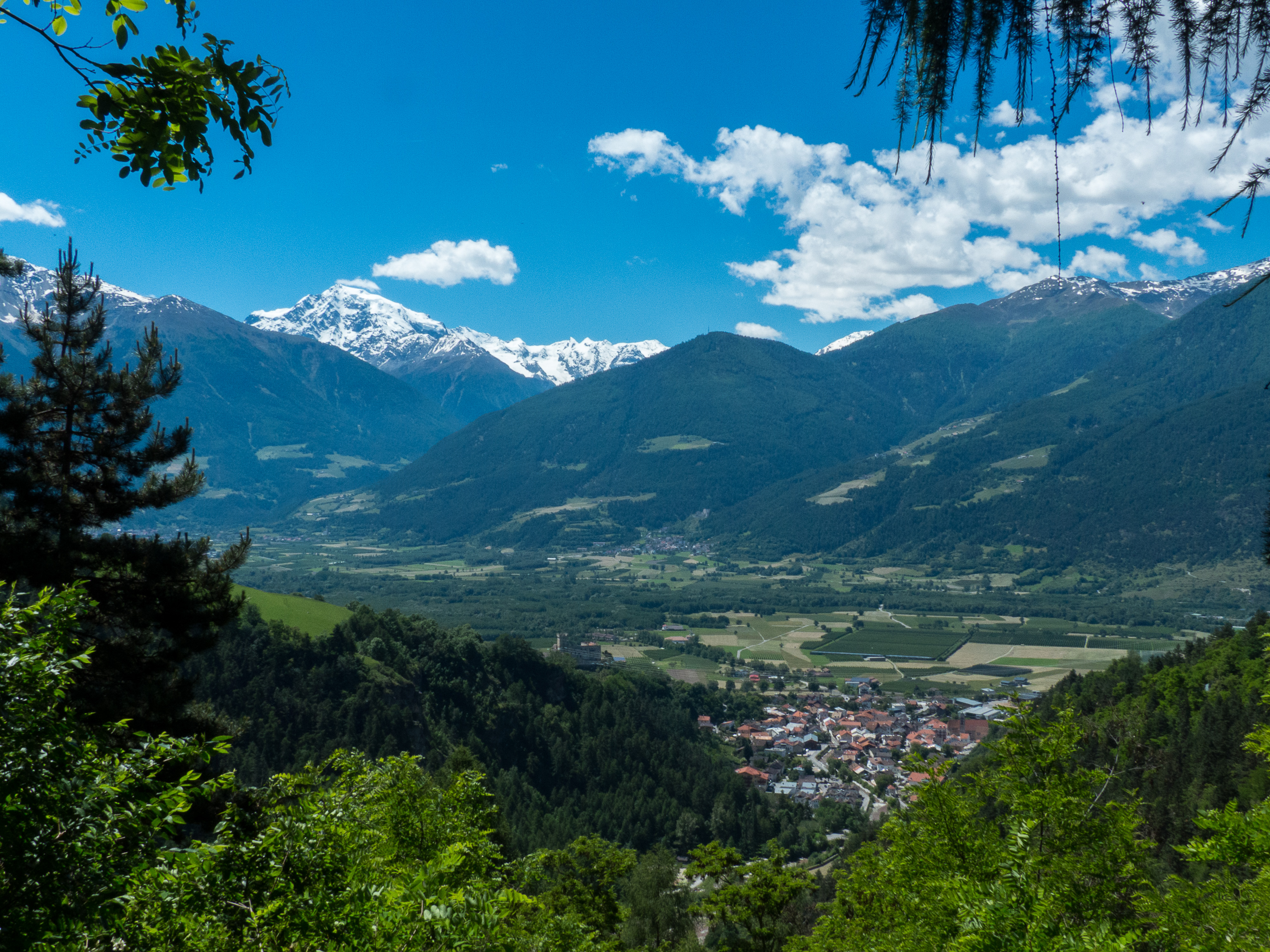
Ganglegg panorama, Italy

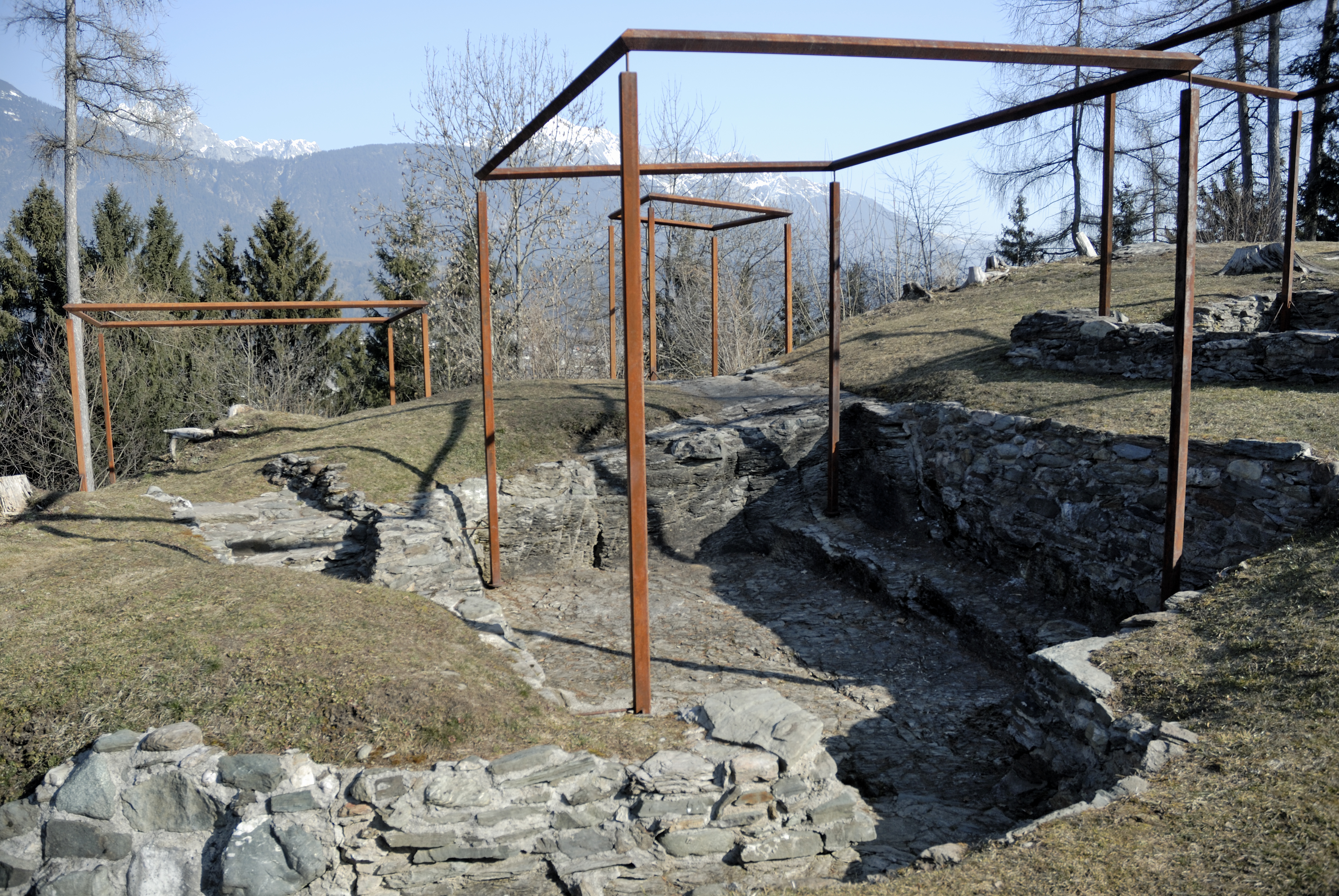
Remains of houses at Rätersiedlung Himmelreich, Austria

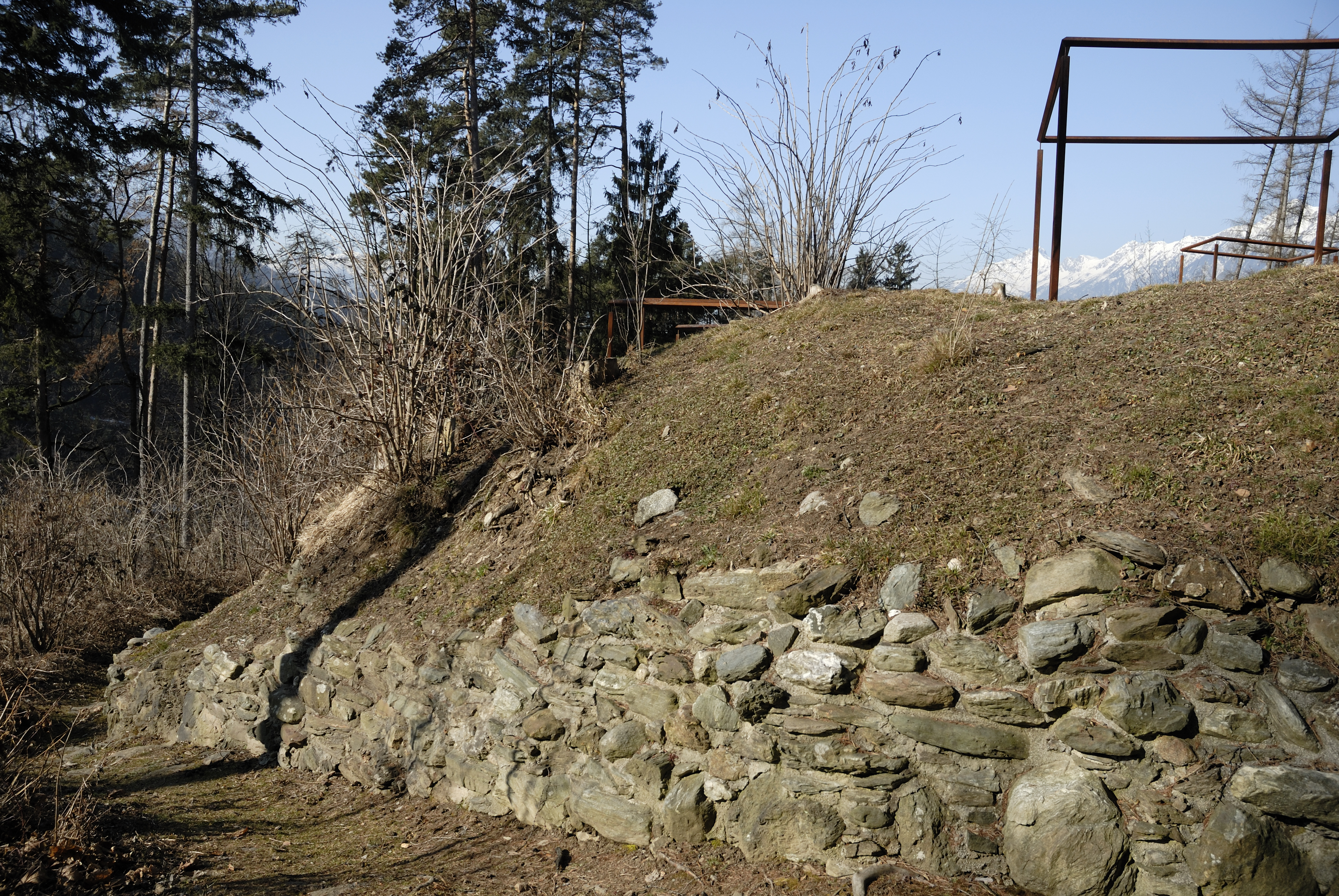
Remains of the outer wall at Rätersiedlung Himmelreich

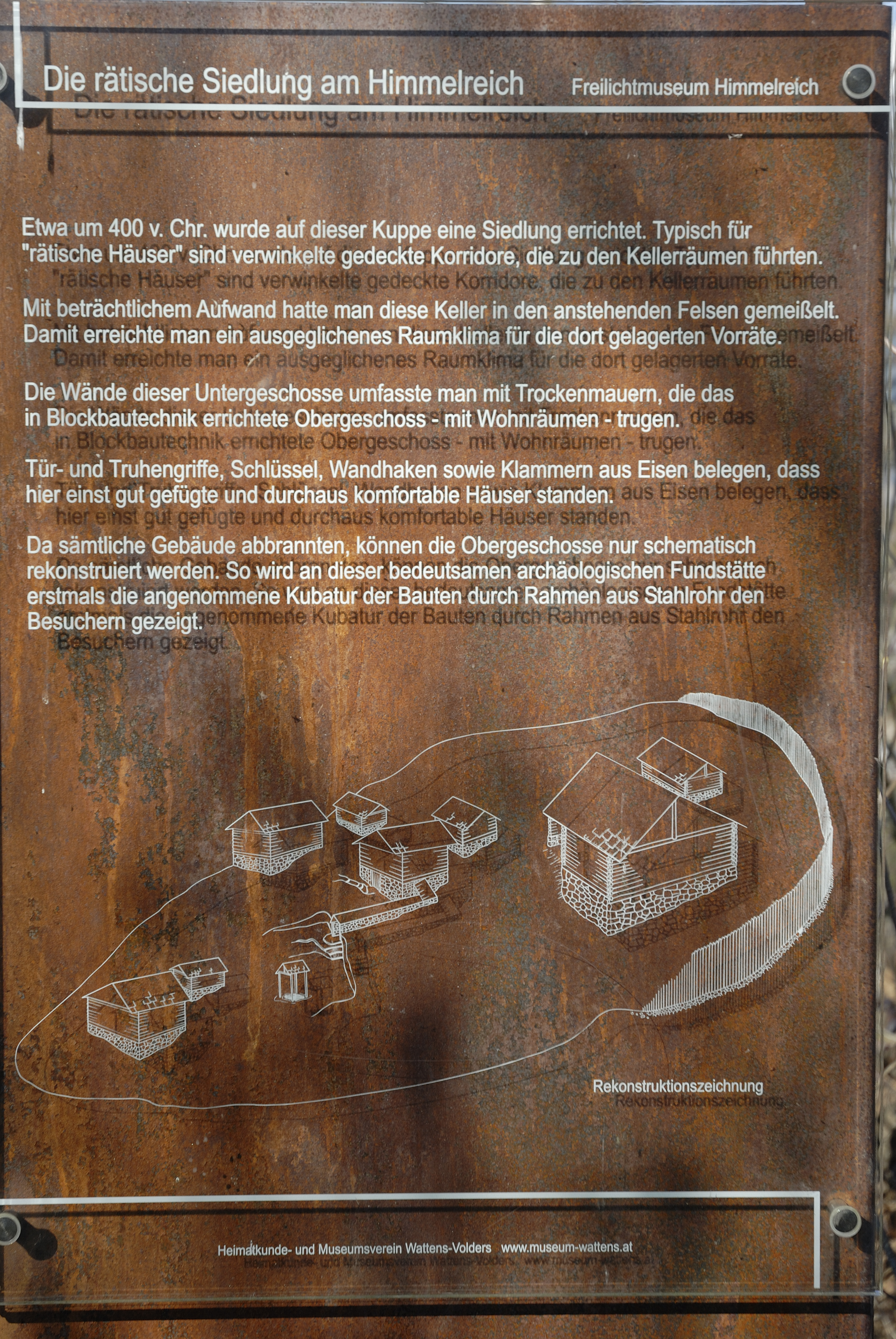
Diagram of buildings at Rätersiedlung Himmelreich

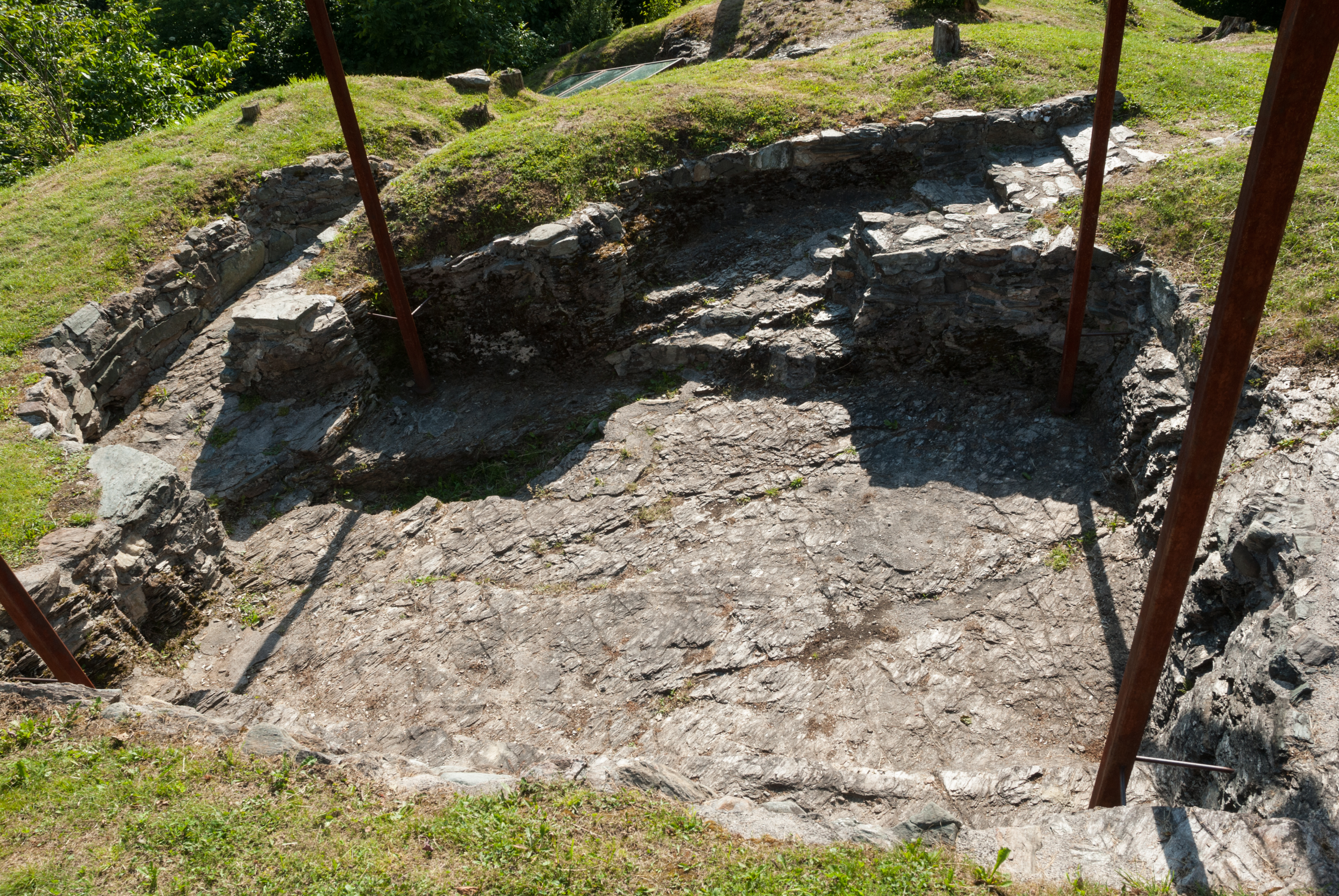
Remains of a house at Rätersiedlung Himmelreich

== Bibliography ==
- Hans Appler: Neue Forschungen zur Vorgeschichte und Römerzeit in Nordtirol. H. Appler, Wattens u. a. 2010, ISBN 978-3-200-01923-2.
- Hans Appler: Fibeln der Bronze- und Eisenzeit des Alttiroler Raumes.. Wattens/Wien 2018, ISBN 978-3-200-05723-4.
- Markus Egg: "Spätbronze- und eisenzeitliche Bewaffnung im mittleren Alpenraum." in Ingrid R. Metzger, Paul Gleirscher (ed.): Die Räter. = I Reti. Verlagsanstalt Athesia, Bozen 1992, ISBN 88-7014-646-4, S. 401–438.
- Peter Gamper. Die latènezeitliche Besiedlung am Ganglegg in Südtirol. Neue Forschungen zur Fritzens-Sanzeno-Kultur. Leidorf, Rahden/Westfalen 2006, ISBN 3-89646-363-2.
- Paul Gleirscher. Die Räter. Rätisches Museum, Chur 1991.
- Paul Gleirscher, Hans Nothdurfter. "Zum Bronze- und Eisenhandwerk der Fritzens-Sanzeno-Gruppe." in Ingrid R. Metzger, Paul Gleirscher (ed.), Die Räter.. Verlagsanstalt Athesia, Bozen 1992, ISBN 88-7014-646-4, S. 349–367.
- Paul Gleirscher, Hans Nothdurfter, Eckehart Schubert: Das Rungger Egg: Untersuchungen an einem eisenzeitlichen Brandopferplatz bei Seis am Schlern in Südtirol. von Zabern, Mainz 2002, ISBN 3-8053-2826-5.
- Amei Lang: Das Gräberfeld von Kundl im Tiroler Inntal. Studien zur vorrömischen Eisenzeit in den zentralen Alpen. Leidorf, Rahden/Westfalen 1998, ISBN 3-89646-531-7 (Zugleich: München, Universität, Habilitations-Schrift, 1996).
- Reimo Lunz: Studien zur End-Bronzezeit und älteren Eisenzeit im Südalpenraum. Sansoni, Florenz 1974 (Zugleich: Innsbruck, Universität, Dissertation, 1971).
- Franco Marzatico, Il gruppo di Fritzens-Sanzeno in Die Räter/I Reti, Bolzano, Athesia, 1992.
- Franco Marzatico: I materiali preromani della valle dell’Adige nel Castello di Buonconsiglio. 3 Volumes. Provincia autonoma di Trento – Ufficio beni archeologici, Trento 1997, ISBN 88-7702-062-8.
- Johann Nothdurfter. Die Eisenfunde von Sanzeno im Nonsberg. von Zabern, Mainz 1979, ISBN 3-8053-0403-X (Zugleich: Innsbruck, Universität, Dissertation, 1979).
- Hubert Steiner (ed.). Alpine Brandopferplätze. Archäologische und naturwissenschaftliche Untersuchungen.. Editrice Temi, Trient 2010, ISBN 978-88-89706-76-3.
