= Aldrans =

- Municipality
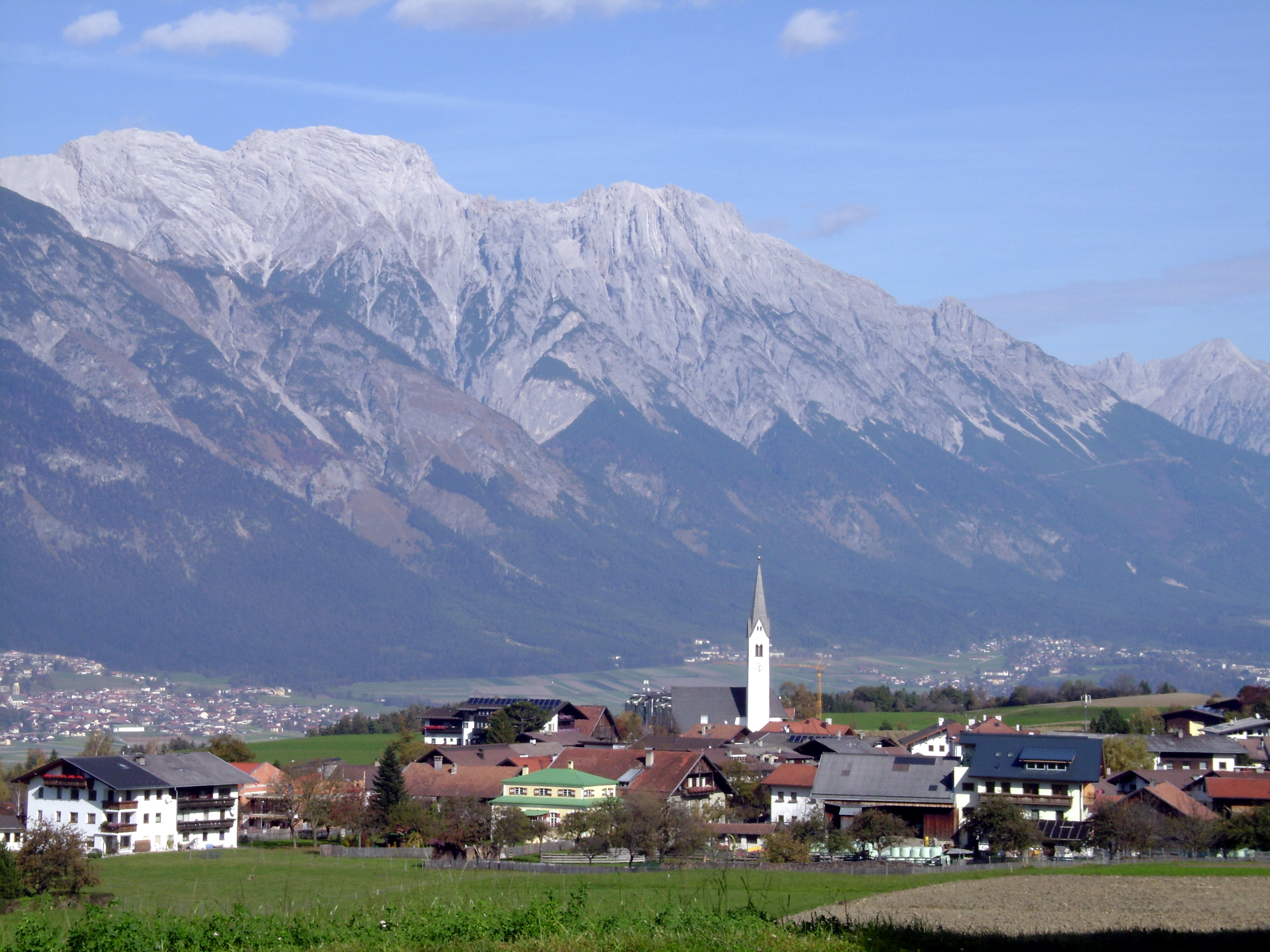

- Coat of arms

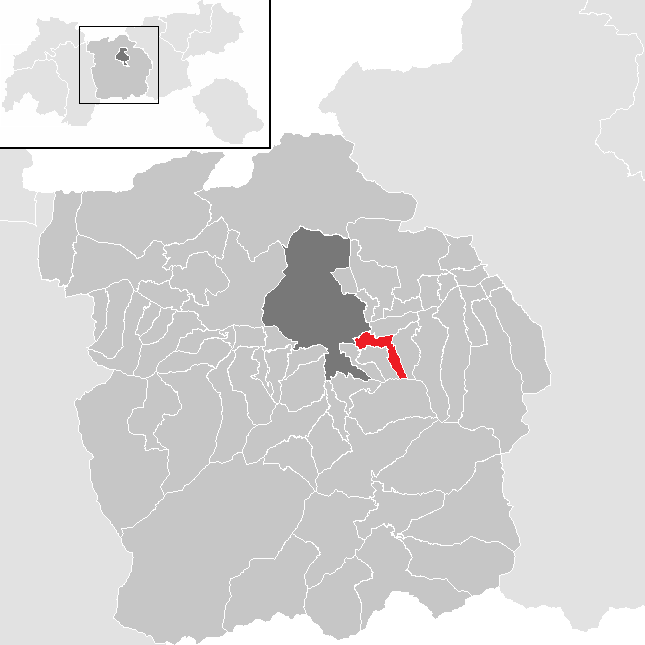
- Location in the district

- Location within Austria
- Coordinates: 47°15′00″N 11°26′00″E
- Country: Austria
- State: Tyrol
- District: Innsbruck Land

Government
  - Mayor: Johannes Strobl (Gemeinschaftsliste Aldrans)

Area
  - Total: 8.89 km^{2} (3.43 sq mi)
- Elevation: 760 m (2,490 ft)

Population (2021)
  - Total: 2,761
  - Density: 311/km^{2} (804/sq mi)
- Time zone: UTC+1 (CET)
  - Summer (DST): UTC+2 (CEST)
- Postal code: 6071
- Area code: 0512
- Vehicle registration: IL
- Website: www.aldrans.at

Aldrans is a municipality in the Innsbruck-Land District, Tyrol (Austria) at an altitude of 760 m (2,490 ft), which had an area of 8.89 km^{2} (3.43 sq mi) and 2,496 inhabitants as January 2015.

== Geography ==
The village is on a highlands terrace southeast of Innsbruck, crossed by numerous river valleys, below the Patscherkofel (2,246 m (7,369 ft)). Aldrans is on the ancient salt road, which connected Hall in Tirol and Mühlbachl—now the regional road Landesstraße L 38 (Elbögener Straße); the road L 32 (Innsbrucker Straße) connects the village with Innsbruck. Its nearness to the city it makes a residential centre. Part of the municipal boundaries are Prockenhöfe, Wiesenhof, Rans and Herzsee, a lake that is mainly used for fish breeding.

Neighbour municipalities are: Ampass, Ellbögen, Igls, Innsbruck, Lans, Rinn, Sistrans.

== History ==
=== Origin ===
The origin of Aldrans as a settlement could date back to the late Bronze Age, after the discovery of a handle of a sword and other objects of Iron Age and La Tène culture. The first mention of the village is reported in a 955 document as Alarein. In 1157 the village is mentioned in documents relating a donation, among the Counts of Andechs and the Tegernsee Abbey. In 1312, in a document, is mentioned Alrains derived from the old name of Allrainer Veld. In the Middle Ages Aldrans was part of an important market, in cooperation with Ampass, because situated on the salt road benefiting from the transit trade. In the thirteenth century the territory was divided between the Sovereign and the Abbey of Wilten.

The population was passionate of drama so much that, in 1750 and in 1757 play competitions, called Martinsspiele, were organized and it was active the "Theatre of the Amazons" which were part only women. Aldrans in the nineteenth century was developed as a summer resort and in 1884 was directly connected to Innsbruck with a road.

At the edge of the village a broadcasting station was constructed in 1927. It was shut down on March 1., 1984 and afterward dismantled.

Aldrans figures in Thomas Bernhard's story Amras.

=== Coat-of-arms ===
The coat of arms represents the wings of an eagle in the air which form a lily leaf on a gold background. The wings of the eagle remember the insignia of the Counts of Andechs, and the lily leaf that of the Abbey of Tegernsee; the emblem refers to the donation that took place in 1157. The emblem was adopted November 20, 1979.

== Population ==
Historical population
Year	Pop.	±%
1869	312	—
1880	342	+9.6%
1890	329	−3.8%
1900	325	−1.2%
1910	348	+7.1%
1923	376	+8.0%
1934	458	+21.8%
1939	555	+21.2%
1951	773	+39.3%
1961	913	+18.1%
1971	1,149	+25.8%
1981	1,477	+28.5%
1991	1,762	+19.3%
2001	1,944	+10.3%
2011	2,183	+12.3%
2015	2,496	+14.3%

== Main sights ==
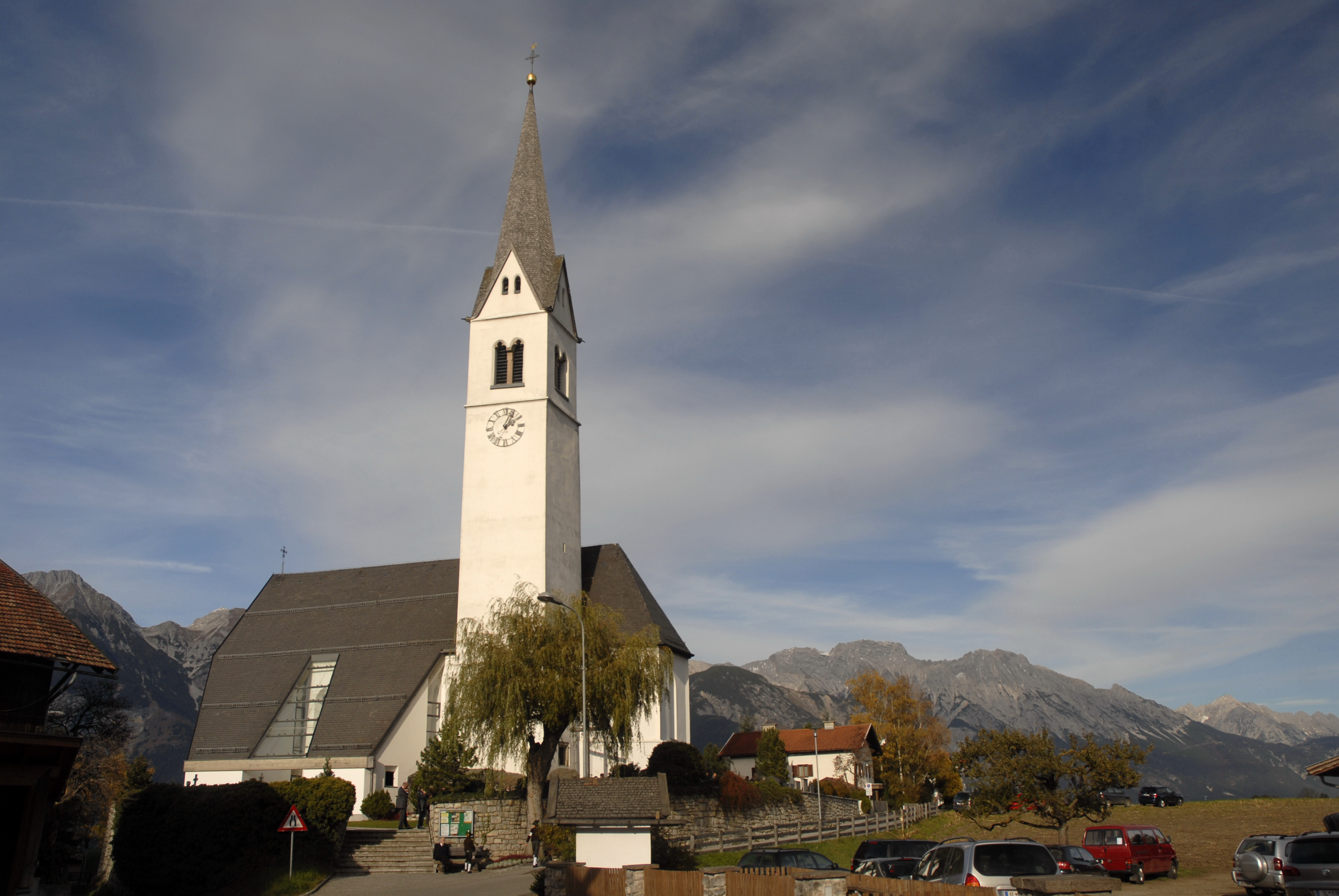
St. Martin parish church

In 1365 is the citation of a church in Aldrans, in 1426 began the construction of a new church in baroque style, inaugurated in 1482 and dedicated to Saint Martin. The church was transformed in the eighteenth century in Gothic style and in 1893 was destroyed by a fire, which devastated part of the village, than was rebuilt in Gothic style. In 1965 it was enlarged and in 1967 was elevated to parish.

== Transport ==
Aldrans is linked with Innsbruck with the Mittelgebirgsbahn (Highlands railways) Line 6 or with local buses from Innsbruck within 15 minutes.
