= Rhaetian (disambiguation) =

The Rhaetian is the latest age of the Triassic Period or the uppermost stage of the Triassic System.

Rhaetian or Raetian may also refer to:

- Raetian language, spoken in ancient times by the tribes in the Eastern Alpine areas, in Switzerland, Austria, North-Eastern Italy and Southern Germany)
- Rhaetian languages, the modern Romance languages spoken in Switzerland and North-Eastern Italy
- Raetia (so always in inscriptions; classical manuscripts usually use the form Rhaetia), a province of the Roman Empire that comprised the districts occupied in modern times by Graubünden, Vorarlberg, the greater part of Tirol, and part of Lombardy. The designation Raetia continued to be used in Carolingian times
- The Rhaetian, the final subdivision of the Triassic (203.6 ± 1.5 – 199.6 ± 0.6 MYA), named for its type sites in the eastern Alps
- The Rhätische Bahn(Rhaetian Railway), called the RhB, which has the largest network of all the private railways in Switzerland
