= Rhaetic =

Ancient extinct language of the Alps

- Raetic
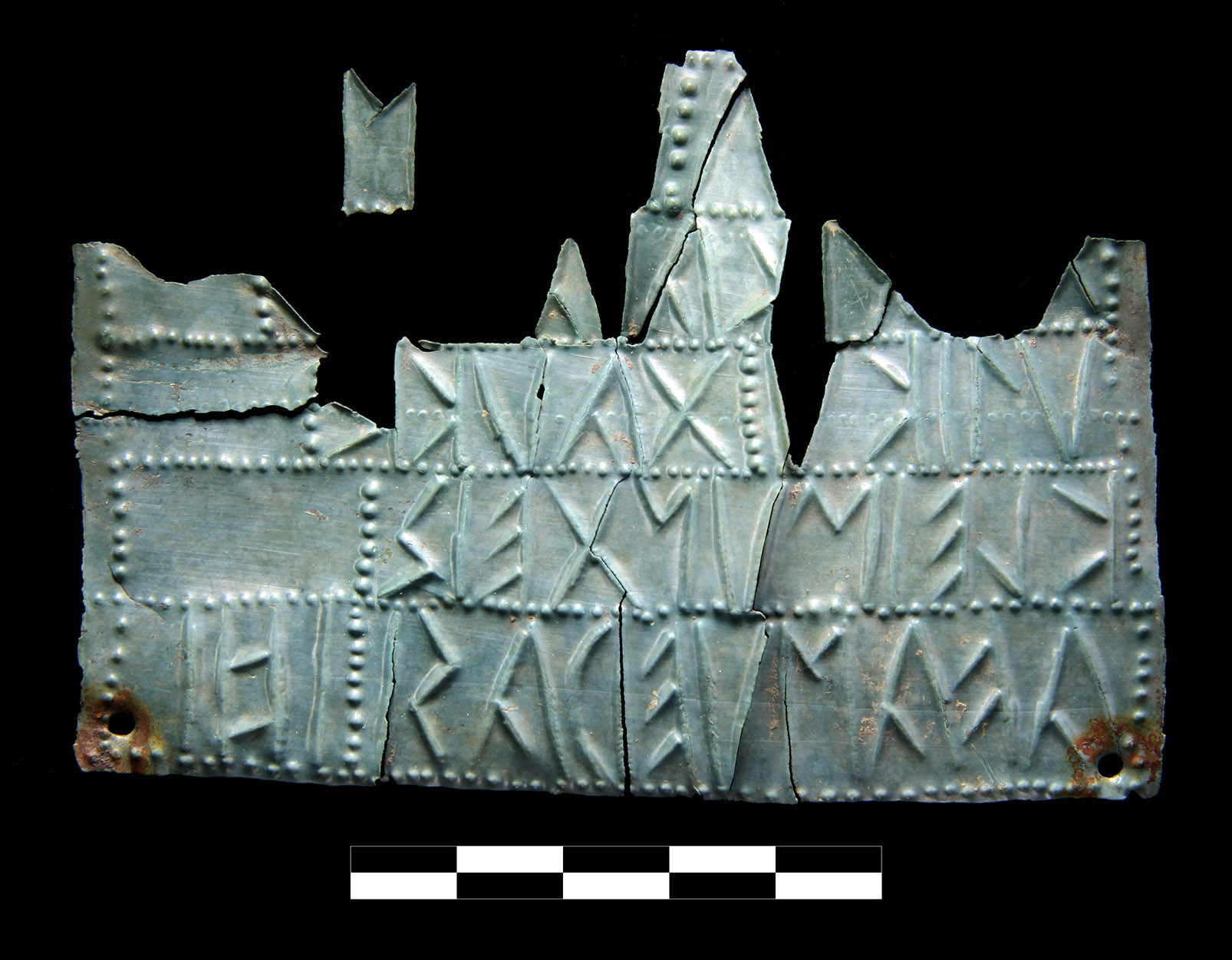
- Bronze plate from Demlfeld, near Ampass (Innsbruck, Austria) written in Sanzeno script. From the turn of the fifth century BC
- Native to: Ancient Rhaetia
- Region: Eastern Alps, Italy, Austria, Switzerland, Germany, Slovenia
- Ethnicity: Rhaetian people
- Era: 6th–1st centuries BC
- Language family: Tyrsenian

Language codes
- ISO 639-3: xrr
- Glottolog: raet1238

Raetic or Rhaetic (/ˈraɪ.tɪk/, RYE-tick), also known as Rhaetian, is an extinct Tyrsenian language spoken in the ancient region of Rhaetia in the eastern Alps in pre-Roman and Roman times. It is documented by around 280 texts dated from the 6th through the 1st century BC, which were found through northern Italy, southern Germany, eastern Switzerland, Slovenia and western Austria, in two variants of the Old Italic scripts. Rhaetic is largely accepted as a non-Indo-European language closely related to Etruscan.

The ancient Rhaetic language is not to be confused with the modern Romance languages of the same Alpine region, known as Rhaeto-Romance.

== Classification ==
The German linguist Helmut Rix proposed in 1998 that Rhaetic, along with Etruscan, was a member of a language family he called Tyrrhenian, and which was possibly influenced by neighboring Indo-European languages. Robert S. P. Beekes likewise does not consider it Indo-European. Howard Hayes Scullard (1967), on the contrary, suggested it to be an Indo-European language, with links to Illyrian and Celtic. In 2007, an article by M. Silvestri and Giancarlo Tomezzoli, which employed computational methods to supplement the traditional methodology of classifying languages into subgroups, identified similarities with the Venetic language. Nevertheless, most scholars now think that Rhaetic was a non-Indo-European language closely related to Etruscan within the Tyrrhenian grouping.

Rix's Tyrrhenian family is supported by a number of linguists such as Stefan Schumacher, Carlo De Simone, Norbert Oettinger, Simona Marchesini, and Rex E. Wallace. Common features between Etruscan, Rhaetic, and Lemnian have been observed in morphology, phonology, and syntax. On the other hand, few lexical correspondences are documented, at least partly due to the scanty number of Rhaetic and Lemnian texts and possibly to the early date at which the languages split. The Tyrsenian family (or Common Tyrrhenic) is often considered to be Paleo-European and to predate the arrival of Indo-European languages in southern Europe.

== History ==
Tyrrhenian language family tree as proposed by de Simone and Marchesini (2013)

The language is documented in the Central and Eastern Alps between the 6th and the 1st centuries BC by about 280 texts, a geographic distribution that largely corresponds to the Iron Age Fritzens-Sanzeno and Magrè cultures. The Rhaetic inscriptions are written in a specific group of North Etruscan alphabets (primarily the Sanzeno and Magrè scripts). Rather than a direct transmission from the Etruscans, modern epigraphic research demonstrates that the Rhaetians adopted literacy through Venetic mediation, adapting the script to their own language.

This linguistic connection was interpreted by classical historiographers as evidence of a common origin with the Etruscans. In his Natural History (1st century AD), Pliny wrote:

... adjoining these (the Noricans) are the Rhaeti and Vindelici. All are divided into several states. (Note: in multas civitates divisi.) The Rhaeti are believed to be people of Etruscan race (Note: Tuscorum prolem): "offshoot of the Etruscans." driven out by the Gauls; their leader was named Rhaetus.

While modern historical-linguistic research has confirmed a genetic relationship between the Etruscan and Rhaetic languages within the Tyrsenian family, modern archaeological consensus rejects the classical narrative of an Etruscan migration or flight into the Alps due to the arrival of the Gauls. Archaeological evidence demonstrates local, alpine cultural continuity dating back at least to the Bronze Age, showing that the Rhaetians were an indigenous Alpine population rather than ethnic Etruscan refugees; the ancient account of their descent is instead considered an erudite reconstruction triggered by the recognition of their linguistic similarities.

In 2004, L. Bouke van der Meer proposed that Rhaetic could have split from Etruscan around 900 BC or even earlier, and no later than 700 BC, since structural divergences are already present in the oldest Etruscan and Rhaetic inscriptions, such as in the past-tense grammatical voices or in the endings of male gentilicia. Around 600 BC, the Rhaetians became isolated from the Etruscan area, probably due to Celtic expansion, which limited further contact between the two languages. However, such a recent dating has not achieved consensus because the split would still be too shallow to account for the linguistic differences; furthermore, it conflicts with archaeological data, as the Rhaeti of the second Iron Age are characterized by the Fritzens-Sanzeno culture, which displays direct continuity with the late Bronze Age and early Iron Age Laugen-Melaun culture. Consequently, archaeological evidence does not support a recent common ethnic descent between the two populations. Helmut Rix dated the end of the Proto-Tyrsenian period to the last quarter of the 2nd millennium BC. Carlo De Simone and Simona Marchesini have proposed a much earlier date, placing the Tyrsenian language split before the Bronze Age. This would provide an explanation for the low number of lexical correspondences between the two languages.

In 2002, during excavations at the sanctuary site of Demlfeld in the Austrian Tyrol, archaeologists from the University of Innsbruck discovered a bronze plaque known as the "Demlfeld plaque", named after the locality near Ampass in the Innsbruck-Land District. The Demlfeld sanctuary was an alpine open-air sacrificial site (Brandopferplatz) and is believed to have been active during the Second Iron Age, from the 6th to the 1st century BC.

== Writing ==
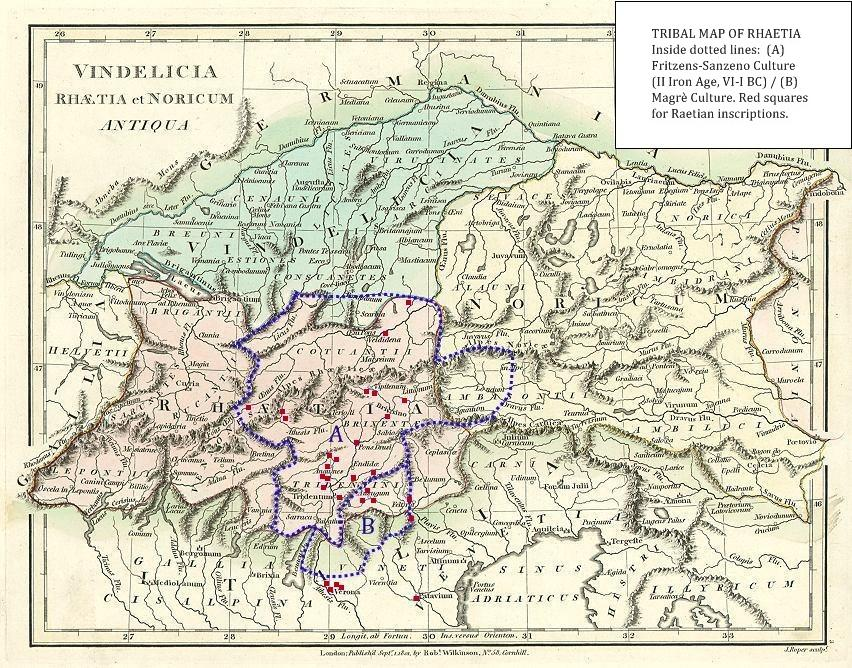
Retic culture and inscriptions

Rhaetic was written using two varieties of the Etruscan alphabet: the Sanzeno and Magrè alphabets. They were almost identical except for the writing of a few characters. Generally, in the Sanzeno alphabet, pi is written with two lines, lambda and upsilon are pointed down, and heta uses two horizontal lines. In the Magrè alphabet, pi uses three lines, lambda and upsilon are pointed up, and heta uses three horizontal lines. Additionally, alpha, phi, tau, and the letter for the dental affricate are written differently. Besides characters, the two alphabets also differ slightly in punctuation. Word separation is sometimes seen in Sanzeno texts, but never seen in Magrè texts.

Magrè was more commonly used to write Rhaetic than Sanzeno. The vast majority of Sanzeno texts are from far northern Italy, and only from the 4th and 5th centuries BC. Magrè texts however have been found from northern Italy to southern Germany, and cover the entire known time Rhaetic was spoken.

The origins of Rhaetic's alphabets are ultimately unknown, but they seem to have been adopted through Venetic. The punctuation and the direction certain letters face in Magrè, as well as Magrè's use in close vicinity to Venetic, suggest some sort of relationship between them. Sanzeno, however, retains many traditional Etruscan writing traditions. Both alphabets use a unique letter for the dental affricate however, something that Etruscan's zeta could have provided if Etruscan was the source of either of the Rhaetic alphabets. In Venetic however, zeta is rarely used, suggesting it as the more likely source of the Rhaetic alphabets. It is still unknown whether the two alphabets share a common origin or if they developed independently of each other, and to what degree if they did.

Rhaetic alphabets (Note: Standardized alphabets. Many (especially Magrè) inscriptions use various forms of these characters)
	alpha	epsilon	wau	zeta	heta	theta	iota	kappa	lambda	mu	nu	pi	san	rho	sigma	tau	/t^{s}/ (Note: dental affricate)	upsilon	phi	chi
Sanzeno				(none)																
Magrè																				

As of April 2020, there are 389 total inscriptions listed in the Thesaurus Inscriptionum Raeticarum's corpus. Of these, only 112 have been positively identified as Rhaetic. 177 have only two characters or less, and many have not been transliterated.

== Phonology ==
Our understanding of Rhaetic phonology is quite uncertain, and the working hypothesis is that it is very similar to Etruscan phonology.

=== Vowels ===
It appears that Rhaetic, like Etruscan, had a four-vowel system: /a/, /i/, /e/, /u/.

=== Consonants ===
Unlike Etruscan, Rhaetic does not seem to have the distinction between aspirated and non-aspirated stops. Consonant phonemes attested in Rhaetic include a dental (or palatal) affricate /ts/, dental sibilant /s/, palatal sibilant /ʃ/, nasals /n/, /m/ and liquids /r/, /l/.

== Morphology ==
=== Nouns ===
The following cases are attested in Rhaetic:

- Nominative/Accusative: No ending
- Genitive: Ending -s
- Pertinentive (locative to the genitive): Endings -si and -(a-)le
- Locative: Ending -i (uncertainly attested)
- Ablative: Ending -s

For plural, the ending -r(a) is attested.

=== Verbs ===
Two verbal suffixes have been identified, both known from Etruscan:

- -ke is the 3rd person preterite ending
- -u is the suffix that derives verbal nouns from preterite forms.

== See also ==
- Rhaetian people
- Rhaetic alphabets
- Fritzens-Sanzeno culture
- Etruscan language
- Etruscan civilization
- Tyrsenian languages
- Camunic language
- Iceman (2017 film)

== Sources ==
- Beekes, Robert Stephen Paul (2011). Comparative Indo-European Linguistics: An Introduction (2nd ed.). Amsterdam: John Benjamins Publishing. ISBN 9789027211859.
- Belfiore, Valentina (2020). "Etrusco" [Etruscan]. Palaeohispanica (in Italian). 20 (20): 199–262. doi:10.36707/palaeohispanica.v0i20.382.
- de Simone, Carlo (2009). "La nuova iscrizione tirsenica di Efestia" [The New Tyrsenic Inscription of Hephaistia]. In Archontidou, Aglaia; de Simone, Carlo; Greco, Emmanuele (eds.). Gli scavi di Efestia e la nuova iscrizione 'tirsenica'. Tripodes (in Italian). Vol. 11. pp. 3–58.
- de Simone, Carlo; Marchesini, Simona, eds. (2013). "La lamina di Demlfeld". Mediterranea. Quaderni annuali dell'Istituto di Studi sulle Civiltà italiche e del Mediterraneo antico del Consiglio Nazionale delle Ricerche (in Italian). Supplemento 8. Pisa/Roma: Fabrizio Serra Editore. ISSN 1827-0506.
- Haarmann, Harald (2014). "Ethnicity and Language in the Ancient Mediterranean". In McInerney, Jeremy (ed.). A Companion to Ethnicity in the Ancient Mediterranean. Chichester, UK: John Wiley & Sons, Inc. pp. 17–33. doi:10.1002/9781118834312.ch2. ISBN 9781444337341.
- Harding, Anthony H. (2014). "The later prehistory of Central and Northern Europe". In Renfrew, Colin; Bahn, Paul (eds.). The Cambridge World Prehistory. Vol. 3. Cambridge, UK: Cambridge University Press.
- Kirchmayr, Magdalena; Schumacher, Stefan (2019). "Ein Miniaturschild mit rätischer Inschrift vom Fernpass". In Hye, Simon; Töchterle, Ulrike (eds.). UPIKU:TAUKE: Festschrift für Gerhard Tomedi zum 65. Geburtstag (in German). Bonn: Dr. Rudolf Habelt GmbH. pp. 257–268. ISBN 978-3-7749-4214-1.
- Marchesini, Simona (2013). "I rapporti etrusco/retico-italici nella prima Italia alla luce dei dati linguistici: il caso della "mozione" etrusca". Rivista storica dell'antichità (in Italian). 43. Bologna: Pàtron editore: 9–32. ISSN 0300-340X.
- Marchesini, Simona (2014). "Nuove iscrizioni retiche da Cles e Sanzeno (TN): Verso una ricostruzione della lingua retica". In Marzatico, Franco (ed.). Antichi popoli delle Alpi: Sviluppi culturali durante l'età del Ferro nei territori alpini centro-orientali (in Italian). Trento: Soprintendenza per i Beni Archeologici della Provincia Autonoma di Trento. pp. 123–140.
- Marchesini, Simona; Roncador, Rosa (2015). Monumenta Linguae Raeticae (in Italian). Rome: Scienze e Lettere. ISBN 978-88-6687-079-1.
- Marchesini, Simona; Roncador, Rosa (2016). "Celts and Raetians in the central-eastern Alpine Region during the Second Iron Age: multidisciplinary research". In Armit, Ian; Potrebica, Hrvoje; Črešnar, Matija; Mason, Philip; Büster, Lindsey (eds.). Cultural Encounters in Iron Age Europe. Series Minor. Budapest: Archaeolingua. pp. 267–284. ISBN 978-963-9911-85-7.
- Marchesini, Simona (2016). "Die Rolle der Schrift in Selbstwahrnehmung und Identitätskonstitution bei antiken Völkern: Das Beispiel des rätischen Gebiets (Jüngere Alpine Eisenzeit)". Archaeologia Austriaca (in German). 100. Verlag der Österreichischen Akademie der Wissenschaften: 189–199. doi:10.1553/archaeologia100s189.
- Marchesini, Simona (2016). "Il rapporto tra committente e destinatario nell'istrumentum inscriptum: la prospettiva del linguista". In Buora, Maurizio; Magnani, Stefano (eds.). Le iscrizioni con funzione didascalico-esplicativa: Committente, destinatario, contenuto e descrizione dell'oggetto nell'Instrumentum Inscriptum. Antichità Altoadriatiche (in Italian). Aquileia: Editreg. pp. 55–72.
- Marchesini, Simona (2018). "Raetic". Mnamon - Ancient Writing Systems in the Mediterranean. Translated by Rockenhaus, Melanie. Scuola Normale Superiore.
- Marchesini, Simona; Zaghetto, Luca (2019). "The Situla in Providence: A comprehensive analysis of inscription and decorative program". In Hye, Simon; Töchterle, Ulrike (eds.). UPIKU:TAUKE: Festschrift für Gerhard Tomedi zum 65. Geburtstag. Bonn: Dr. Rudolf Habelt GmbH. pp. 329–342. ISBN 978-3-7749-4214-1.
- Marchesini, Simona (2019). "L'onomastica nella ricostruzione del lessico: il caso di Retico ed Etrusco". Mélanges de l'École française de Rome: Antiquité (in Italian). 131 (1). Rome: École française de Rome: 123–136. doi:10.4000/mefra.7613. ISBN 978-2-7283-1428-7. S2CID 214398787.
- Marchesini, Simona (2021). "The Inscription on the Miniature Shield from Fernpass (A) and the Plural Suffixes in Rhaetic". Sylloge Epigraphica Barcinonensis. 19: 13–26. ISSN 2013-4134.
- Marzatico, Franco (2019). "I Reti e i popoli delle Alpi orientali". Preistoria Alpina (in Italian). 49bis. Trento: MUSE-Museo delle Scienze: 73–82. ISSN 2035-7699.
- Mellaart, James (1975). The Neolithic of the Near East. World of Archeology. New York: Scribner. ISBN 9780684144832.
- Morandi, Alessandro (1999). "Il cippo di Castelciès nell'epigrafia retica". Studia archaeologica. 103. Rome: Bretschneider.
- Oettinger, Norbert (2010). "Seevölker und Etrusker". In Cohen, Yoram; Gilan, Amir; Miller, Jared L. (eds.). Pax Hethitica Studies on the Hittites and their Neighbours in Honour of Itamar Singer (in German). Wiesbaden: Otto Harrassowitz Verlag. pp. 233–246. ISBN 978-3-447-06119-3.
- Prosdocimi, Aldo L. (2003-4). "Sulla formazione dell'alfabeto runico. Promessa di novità documentali forse decisive". Archivio per l'Alto Adige 97–98.427–440
- Rix, Helmut (1998). Rätisch und Etruskisch [Rhaetian & Etruscan]. Vorträge und kleinere Schriften (in German). Innsbruck: Innsbrucker Beiträge zur Sprachwissenschaft: Institut für Sprachwissenschaft der Universität Innsbruck.
- Rix, Helmut (2008). "Etruscan". In Woodard, Roger D. (ed.). The Ancient Languages of Europe. Cambridge: Cambridge University Press. pp. 141–164. doi:10.1017/CBO9780511486814.010. ISBN 9780511486814.
- Roncador, Rosa; Marchesini, Simona (2015). Monumenta Linguae Raeticae. Rome: Scienze e Lettere.
- Salomon, Corinna (2020). "Rético" [Raetic]. Palaeohispanica. Revista sobre lenguas y culturas de la Hispania Antigua (20): 263–298. doi:10.36707/palaeohispanica.v0i20.380. ISSN 1578-5386.
- Schumacher, Stefan (1998). "Sprachliche Gemeinsamkeiten zwischen Rätisch und Etruskisch". Der Schlern (in German). 72: 90–114.
- Schumacher, Stefan (1999). "Die Raetischen Inschriften: Gegenwärtiger Forschungsstand, spezifische Probleme und Zukunfstaussichten". I Reti / Die Räter, Atti del simposio 23-25 settembre 1993, Castello di Stenico, Trento, Archeologia delle Alpi, a cura di G. Ciurletti. F. Marzatico Archaoalp. pp. 334–369.
- Schumacher, Stefan (2004) [1992]. Die rätischen Inschriften. Geschichte und heutiger Stand der Forschung. Sonderheft (2nd ed.). Innsbruck: Innsbrucker Beiträge zur Kulturwissenschaft: Institut für Sprachwissenschaft der Universität Innsbruck.
- Scullard, HH (1967). The Etruscan Cities and Rome. Ithaca, NY: Cornell University Press.
- Van der Meer, L. Bouke (2004). "Etruscan origins. Language and archaeology". Babesch. 79: 51–57.
- Wallace, Rex E. (2010). "Italy, Languages of". In Gagarin, Michael (ed.). The Oxford Encyclopedia of Ancient Greece and Rome. Oxford, UK: Oxford University Press. pp. 97–102. doi:10.1093/acref/9780195170726.001.0001. ISBN 9780195170726.
- Wallace, Rex E. (2018), "Lemnian language", Oxford Research Encyclopedia of Classics, Oxford, UK: Oxford University Press, doi:10.1093/acrefore/9780199381135.013.8222, ISBN 978-0-19-938113-5
