= Laugen-Melaun culture =

Ancient alpine culture

- Geographical range: North Italy, Austria, Switzerland
- Period: Bronze Age, Iron Age
- Dates: c. 1350 BC - 500 BC
- Preceded by: Urnfield culture, Facies of the pile dwellings and of the dammed settlements
- Followed by: Fritzens-Sanzeno culture

The Laugen-Melaun culture (from German Laugen-Melaun-Kultur) or Luco culture (in Italian) was a late Bronze Age and early Iron Age archaeological culture in the Alps, between Trentino, South Tyrol, East Tyrol, and in the part of Engadin below the Reschen Pass. The name derives from two findspots in the Eisacktal, where artefacts belonging to the culture have been found: the small Lake Laugen between Natz and Elvas and the village of Mellaun (formerly spelt "Melaun") near Brixen. The term was coined in 1927 by Gero von Merhart.

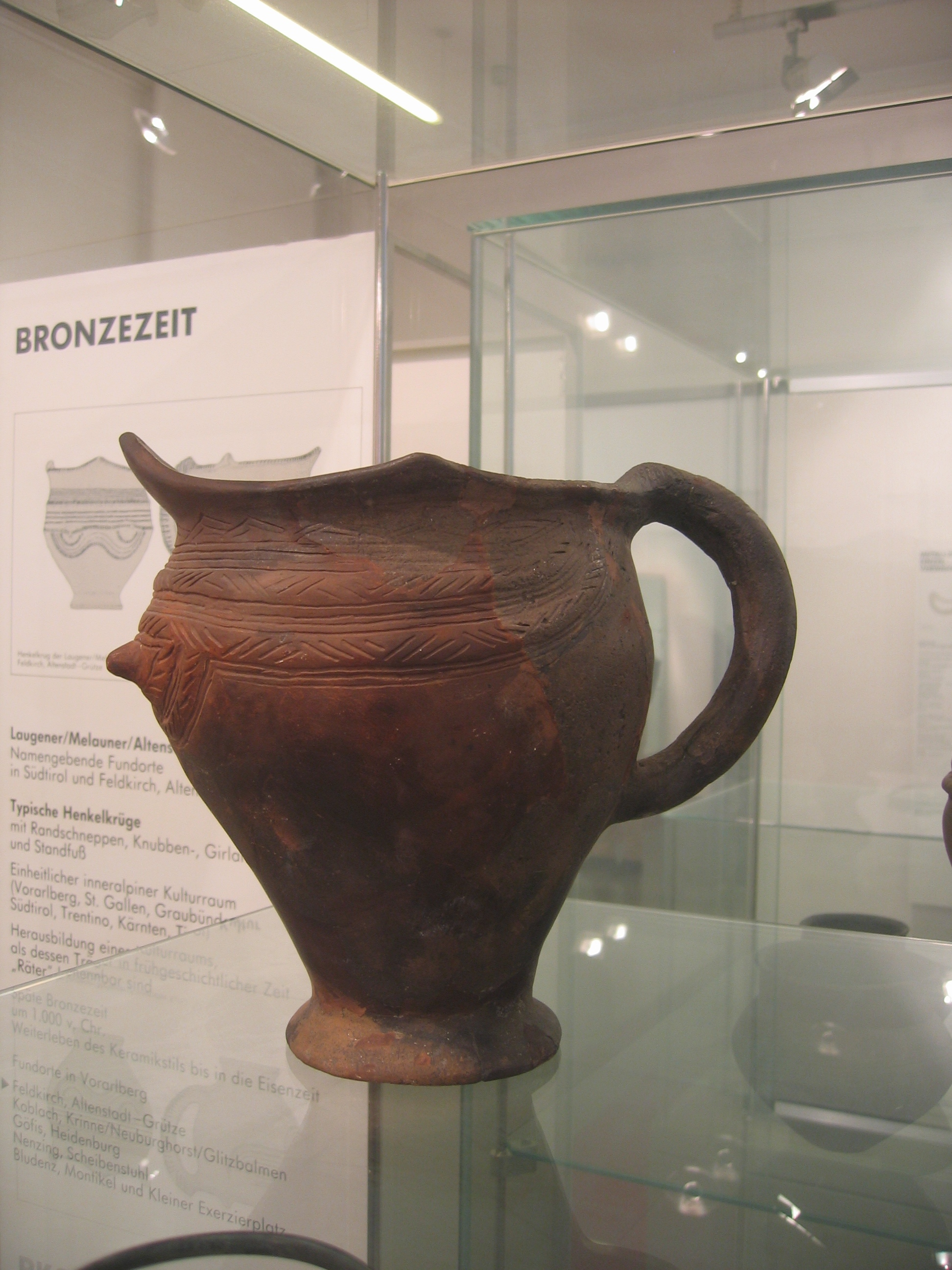
Jug of the Laugen-Melaun-Kultur, ca. 1000 BC, found at Feldkirch, Austria.

== Development ==
The Laugen-Melaun culture developed over the 14th century BC, as part of the general cultural revolutions in Europe at this time, which began in central Europe and eventually led to the formation of the Urnfield culture. This process involved around three hundred years of population movements. Several groups reached the Mediterranean and the old cultures took note of it. After the sudden break, the Urnfield culture no longer buried the dead in large stone family graves and cremated the dead instead, placing their ashes in urns. New religious ideas must have laid behind this change.

== Characteristics ==
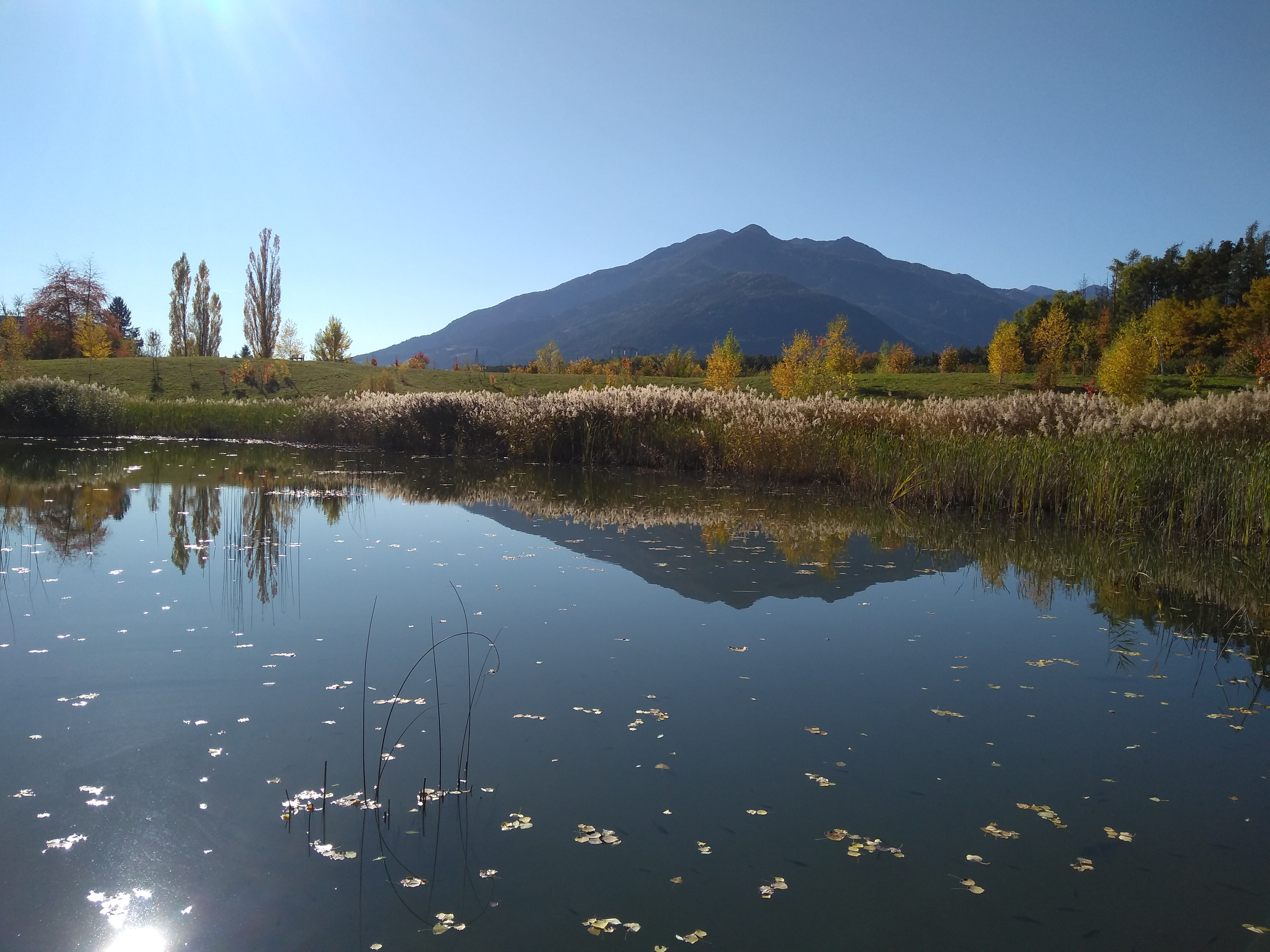
View of Lake Laugen, which gave its name to the culture as a result of archaeological finds.

The culture is found south of the main ridge of the Alps from about 1350/1250 BC. Ceramics are of a particularly high quality and come in numerous new forms, including jugs decorated with complex patterns. From archaeological sources it is not possible to tell whether the Adige valley and its side valleys were conquered by foreign peoples, since most settlements of the Middle Bronze Age were reoccupied by the Laugen-Melaun culture. It is possible that it was only a new warrior elite entered the region, bringing the new culture impulse with them.

In addition to ceramics and cremation, the new culture saw the erection of special sanctuaries, often in exceptionally isolated locations. These sanctuaries are sometimes high piles of stones, sometimes mountain summits, and sometimes near the water. They are always connected to the burning of votive offerings. It appears that feasting took place while the offerings were burning, since heaps of smashed pottery are typical of the sanctuary sites. Especially notable are the many jugs and bowls. These vessels suggest that wine played an important role in their rituals. Alongside metals, wine was the most important trade good of the Adige.

The pitcher of Laugen, found at Villanders and preserved at the South Tyrol Museum of Archaeology, is typical of the culture: it has a triangular nozzle, a decorative outer grooves, and a height of 18.3 cm; next to the handle are two horn-shaped appendices.

== Further development ==
From the 13th century BC until the 11th (Late Bronze Age), the Laugen-Melaun culture was also notable for the creation of copper grave goods (rich grave offerings, "Laugen-Melaun A" also occur in South Tyrol) and therefore suffered when iron arrived in the surrounding region ca. 1000 BC ("Laugen-Melaun B" declined in the East Tyrol and expanded in the East Alpine region, e.g. at Breitegg). In the 8th century, iron was also adopted locally, but the relevant level ("Laugen-Melaun C") did not merge with the northern Hallstatt culture. In the 6th century BC, as a result of Mediterranean influence (especially the Etruscans, but also Greeks in the Po Valley and Veneti), the Laugen-Melaun culture evolved into the Fritzens-Sanzeno culture and merged with the neighbouring Inntal culture to the north, which had previously been a component of the Hallstatt culture. Locally manufactured pottery of the Laugen-Melaun style is found from around 1200 BC in Alpine Rhine region, which is otherwise characterised by different cultural assemblages, and even in Sarganserland.

== Bibliography ==
- Gleirscher, P. (1991). Die Räter. Rätisches Museum Chur.
- Gleirscher, Paul (1992). "Die Laugen-Melaun-Gruppe". In Metzger, Ingrid R.; Gleirscher, Paul (eds.). Die Räter / I Reti. Eine Übersicht zum Forschungsstand der "Räter" aus Anlass der vom Rätischen Museum Chur erarbeiteten gleichnamigen Wanderausstellung. Bozen: Athesia. pp. 117–134. ISBN 88-7014-646-4.
- Leitner, Walter (1987). Eppan - St. Pauls, eine Siedlung der späten Bronzezeit - ein Beitrag zur inneralpinen Laugen/Melaun-Kultur. Innsbruck.
- Leitner, Walter (1988). "Eppan-St. Pauls, eine Siedlung der späten Bronzezeit. Ein Beitrag zur inneralpinen Laugen-Melaun-Kultur". Archaeologia Austriaca. 72: 1–90.
- Niederwanger, Günther (1990). "Ein Laugener Brandopferplatz am Schwarzsee auf dem Seeberg im Sarntal". Der Schlern. 64: 371–397.
