= Sistrans =

Community near Innsbruck, Austria

- Municipality
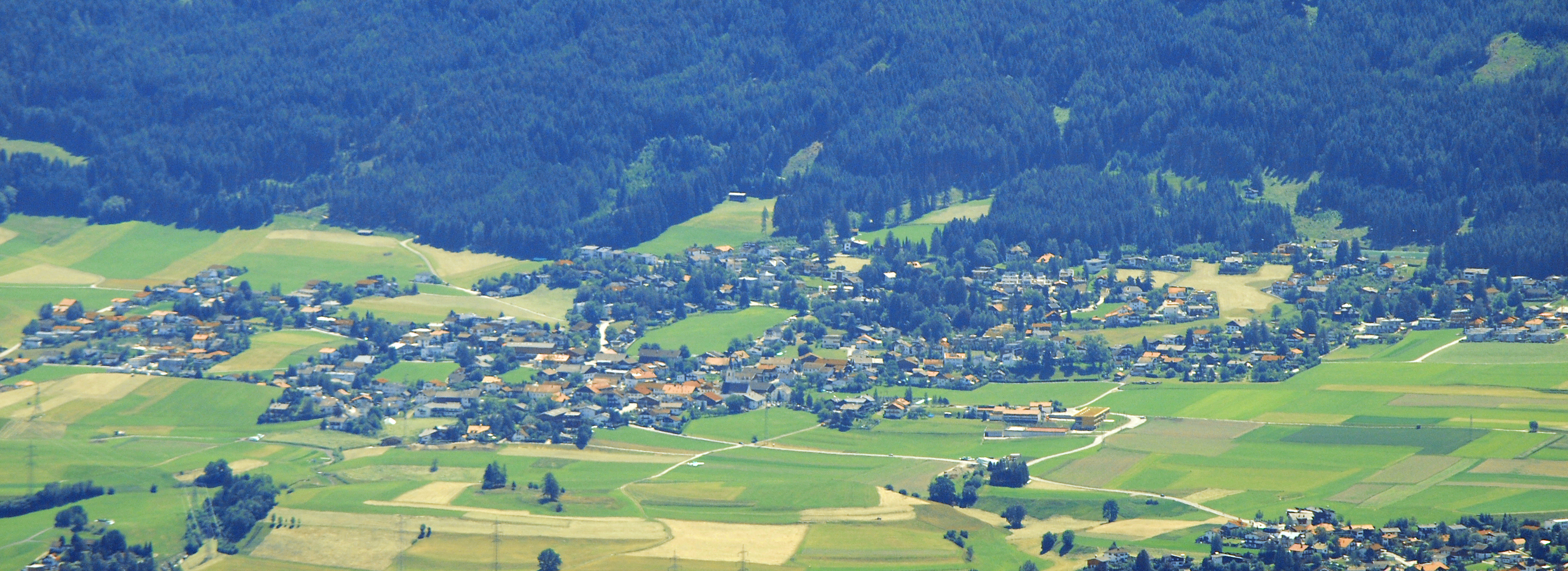

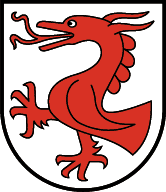
- Coat of arms

- Location within Austria
- Coordinates: 47°14′17″N 11°26′48″E
- Country: Austria
- State: Tyrol
- District: Innsbruck Land

Government
  - Mayor: Johannes Piegger

Area
  - Total: 7.92 km^{2} (3.06 sq mi)
- Elevation: 919 m (3,015 ft)

Population (2020)
  - Total: 2,244
  - Density: 283/km^{2} (734/sq mi)
- Time zone: UTC+1 (CET)
  - Summer (DST): UTC+2 (CEST)
- Postal code: 6073
- Area code: 0512
- Vehicle registration: IL
- Website: www.sistrans.tirol.gv.at

Sistrans is a community in the district of Innsbruck-Land in the Austrian state of Tyrol located 4 km southeast above Innsbruck on the highlands.

== Population ==
Historical population
Year	Pop.	±%
1869	330	—
1880	336	+1.8%
1890	323	−3.9%
1900	341	+5.6%
1910	376	+10.3%
1923	383	+1.9%
1934	388	+1.3%
1939	443	+14.2%
1951	619	+39.7%
1961	590	−4.7%
1971	724	+22.7%
1981	1,032	+42.5%
1991	1,381	+33.8%
2001	1,752	+26.9%
2011	2,049	+17.0%
