= Ampass =

- Municipality
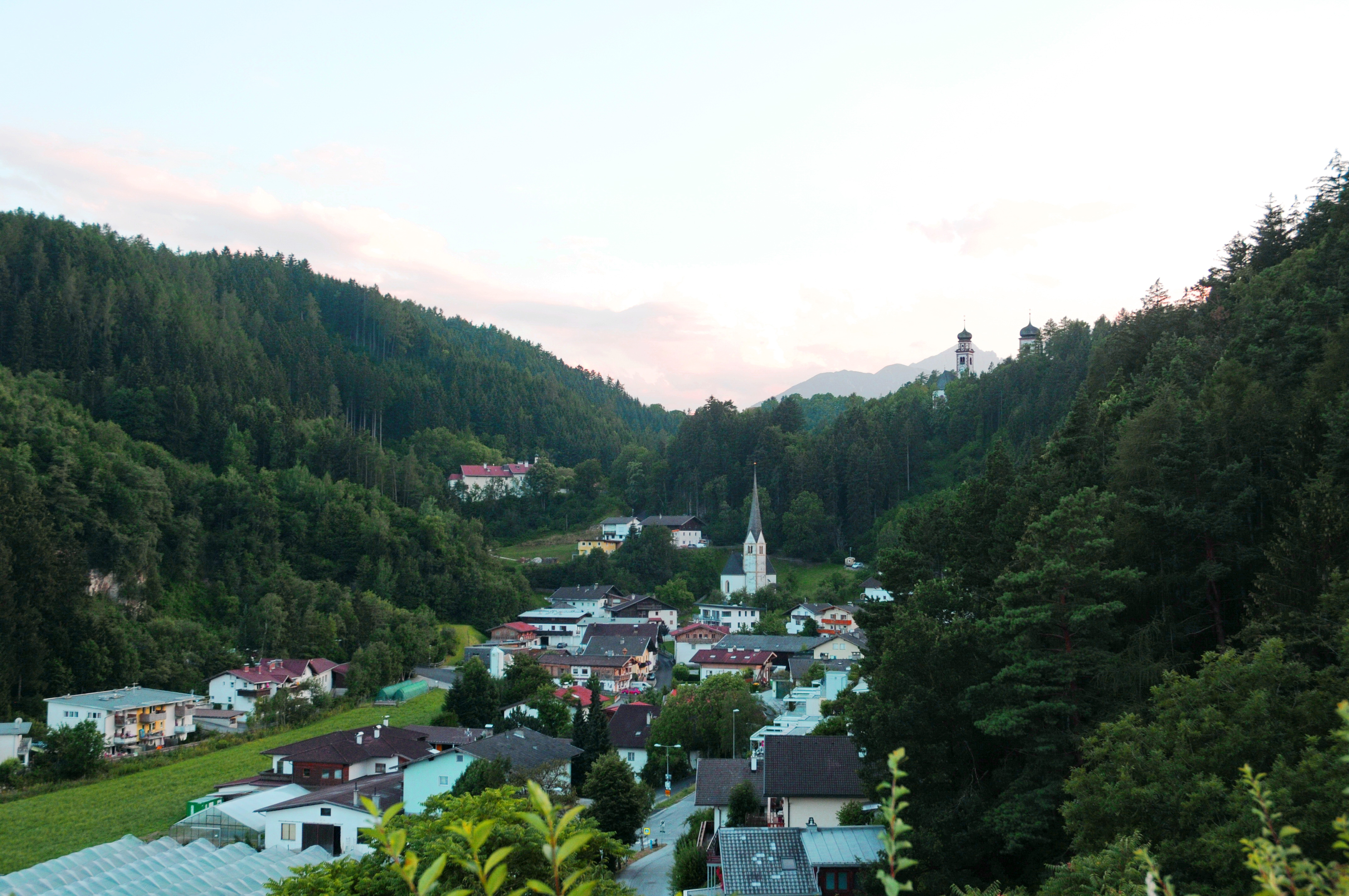
- Ampass

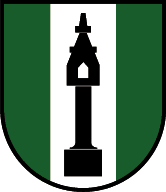
- Coat of arms

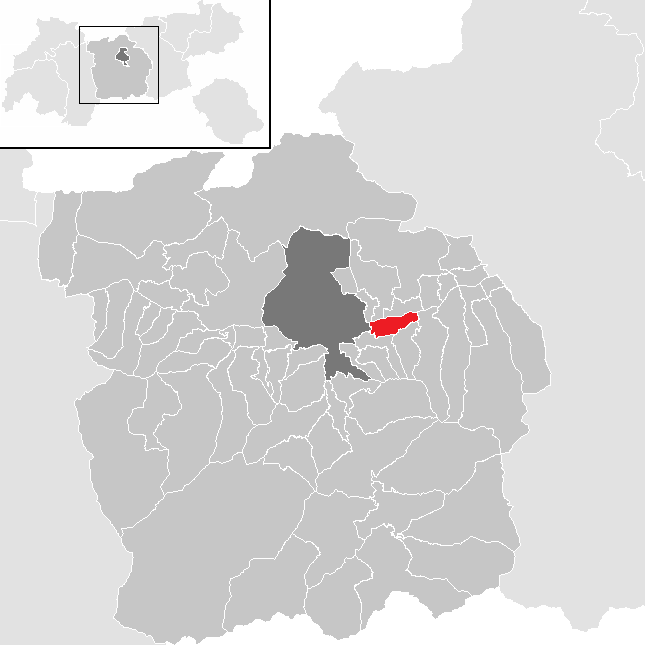
- Location in the district

- Location within Austria
- Coordinates: 47°16′00″N 11°26′00″E
- Country: Austria
- State: Tyrol
- District: Innsbruck Land

Government
  - Mayor: Markus Peer

Area
  - Total: 7.9 km^{2} (3.1 sq mi)
- Elevation: 651 m (2,136 ft)

Population (2021)
  - Total: 1,832
  - Density: 230/km^{2} (600/sq mi)
- Time zone: UTC+1 (CET)
  - Summer (DST): UTC+2 (CEST)
- Postal code: 6070
- Area code: 0512
- Vehicle registration: IL
- Website: www.ampass.tirol.gv.at

Ampass is a municipality in the Innsbruck-Land District, Tyrol (Austria) situated at an altitude of 651 m, has an area of 7.9 km2 and 1829 inhabitants as of January 2025.

== Geography ==
Ampass is located on a terrace on the southern side of the Inn Valley, on an old salt road, from Hall in Tirol to Matrei am Brenner, currently Landesstraße L 38 (Ellbögener Straße). Ampass is connected directly to Innsbruck, which is 8 km far, with the road L 283 (Ampasser Straße). On the outskirts of the village is located the Taxerhof swamp, surrounded by a reed and a wet area, suitable to host herons and wagtails.

== History ==
=== Origin ===
Ampass is likely to be inhabited in the fifteenth century BC as a result of a funerary urn, found on the hill, dating back to that period. A greater number of finds, such as arrowheads, bronze pins, and beads, which have been found, dating back to the Hallstatt culture or to the La Tène Culture. The Romans built a military road, which connected Hall in Tirol with Matrei am Brenner through Igls, Sistrans, Lans, and Ampass. The only remaining evidence of the Roman period is a granite milestone 1.9 m high that is still in its original place, this was taken as a reference in 1254 to delimit the boundary between the parishes of Wilten and Ampass. Ampass suffered in the seventh century, as the entire Tyrol, the invasion of Bavarii of which skeletal traces remain. In 1056, the Emperor Henry IV, Holy Roman Emperor, who succeeded at the age of six years to the death of his father, Henry III, built a chapel, opened by the Bishop of Brixen, Altwin, and later elevated to "Royal Chapel".

In 1145, Ampass is mentioned for the first time in the documents as "Ambanes", a name derived from the Celtic meaning "between two rivers", at that time, it was under the jurisdiction of the Court of Sonnenburg. In 1313, it was elevated to a municipality with its own fiscal autonomy, and in that year, 22 families were on the payroll as taxpayers. With the intensification of trade direct to the south, in 1552, the ancient Roman road has been renovated and enlarged. In 1634, the village was struck by the plague, which decimated the population. In memory of the plague, along the road, on the hill "Sonnenbühel", was erected a votive stele known as "Viertelsäule"; it has become the Ampass, emblem and it is the most famous Gothic stele in Tyrol.

During the Tyrolean rebellion, there were several fights in the municipality; the insurgents were led by Josef Speckbacher, Count Victor Dankl and Kaspar Sautner, a native of Ampass. Following the victory over the Bavarians and the French Ampass passed under the District Court of Hall in Tirol. Between 1840 and early 1900 the population, due to industrial expansion of Innsbruck, declined because people preferred to migrate to the city that offered better job opportunities. The "Viertelsäule" was damaged by unknown assailants in 1876, was restored and put back in its place; then it was restored in 1906 and in 1997 by Johannes Stephan Schlögl. In the recent years, Ampass has grown bigger in agriculture and residential communities.

=== Coat of arms ===
The coat of arms consists of green and white stripes, in the center of which is the "Viertelsäule", the symbol of Ampass erected in memory of the plague. The two green stripes represent the green meadows which surround the village, and the white stripe symbolizes the "salt road". The coat was granted on January 22, 1974.

== Population ==
Historical population
Year	Pop.	±%
1869	421	—
1880	435	+3.3%
1890	438	+0.7%
1900	361	−17.6%
1910	472	+30.7%
1923	516	+9.3%
1934	530	+2.7%
1939	523	−1.3%
1951	621	+18.7%
1961	534	−14.0%
1971	930	+74.2%
1981	1,184	+27.3%
1991	1,158	−2.2%
2001	1,303	+12.5%
2011	1,644	+26.2%
2015	1,793	+9.1%
2025	1,829	+2.0%

== Sights ==
=== Religious architecture ===
==== St. John the Baptist's Parish ====
In 1056, the Emperor Henry IV, Holy Roman Emperor, built a chapel, inaugurated by the Bishop of Brixen Altwin, due to the "Royal Chapel". In 1426, a new church was built in Gothic style, dedicated to "St. John the Baptist," and in 1546, the church had gone to ruin because of the destruction of war, it 1567 was destroyed by fire. In 1574, the building was restored and reopened for worship, but an earthquake in 1698 destroyed it. The church was rebuilt in 1744 and was restored in Baroque style.

==== St. Vitus's Church ====
A church dedicated to Saint Vitus was built in 1429 by carters who transported salt. In 1521, the church was rebuilt on the old foundations, and behind the altar are still visible the traces of the intercessions of the carters. Following the church restoration, were found frescoes with the insignia of Charles V, Holy Roman Empire, Aragon, Sicily, Hungary, and Bohemia were found.
