= Pre-Indo-European languages =

Languages of Eurasia before the arrival of Indo-European languages

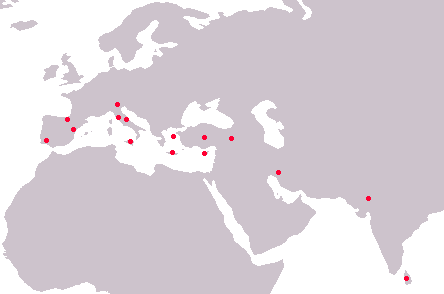
Locations of documented Pre-Indo-European speaking populations

The pre-Indo-European languages are any of several ancient languages, not necessarily related to one another, that existed in Prehistoric Europe, Asia Minor, Ancient Iran, and Southern Asia before the arrival of speakers of Indo-European languages. The oldest Indo-European language texts are Hittite and date from the 19th century BC in Kültepe (modern eastern Turkey), and while estimates vary widely, the spoken Indo-European languages are believed to have developed at the latest by the 3rd millennium BC (see Proto-Indo-European Urheimat hypotheses). Thus, the pre-Indo-European languages must have developed earlier than or, in some cases, alongside the Indo-European languages that ultimately displaced and replaced almost all of them.

A handful of the pre-Indo-European languages are still extant: in Europe, Basque retains a localised strength, with fewer than a million native speakers, whereas the Dravidian languages remain very widespread in the Indian subcontinent, with over 250 million native speakers (the four major languages being Telugu, Tamil, Kannada and Malayalam) and the Brahui that stretches into modern Iran. In the Caucasus, Northwest and Northeast Caucasian languages and Kartvelian languages are still intact, with the first having the least language security of the three pre-Indo-European Caucasian language groups. Some pre-Indo-European languages are attested only as linguistic substrates in Indo-European languages or in toponyms. In much of Western Asia (including Iran and Anatolia), the pre-Indo-European, Caucasian, Semitic languages, Dravidian and language isolates have survived to the present day, although Elamite has entirely disappeared.

== Terminology ==
Before World War II, all the unclassified languages of Europe and the Near East were commonly referred to as Asianic languages, and the term encompassed several languages that were later found to be Indo-European (such as Lydian), and others (such as Hurro-Urartian, Hattic, Elamite, Kassite, Colchian and Sumerian) which were classified as distinct pre-Indo-European language families or language isolates. In 1953, the linguist Johannes Hubschmid identified at least five pre-Indo-European language families in Western Europe: Eurafrican, which covered North Africa, Italy, Spain and France; Hispano-Caucasian, which replaced Eurafrican and stretched from Northern Spain to the Caucasus Mountains; Iberian, which was spoken by most of Spain prior to the Roman conquest of the Iberian peninsula; Libyan, which was spoken mostly in North Africa but encroached into Sardinia; and Etruscan, which was spoken in Northern Italy.

The term pre-Indo-European is not universally accepted, as some linguists maintain the idea of the relatively late arrival of the speakers of the unclassified languages to Europe, possibly even after the Indo-European languages, and so prefer to speak about non-Indo-European languages. The newer term Paleo-European languages is proposed as a preferable description, but is not applicable to the languages that predated or coexisted with Indo-European outside Europe.

== Surviving languages ==
These pre-Indo-European languages have survived to modern times:

- in the Indian subcontinent, the Dravidian languages, Munda languages (a branch of the Austroasiatic languages), Tibeto-Burman languages, Nihali, Kusunda, Vedda and Burushaski.
- in the Caucasus, the Kartvelian, Northeast Caucasian, Northwest Caucasian which together include Georgian, Abkhaz, Circassian, Chechen, Ingush, Dagestani, etc.
- in the Iberian Peninsula and France, Basque.
- in Northern Eurasia, the Paleosiberian languages.

== Languages that contributed substrates to Indo-European languages ==
Examples of suggested or known substrate influences on specific Indo-European languages include the following:

- Pre-Anatolian:
  - Hattic language
  - Colchian
  - Akkadian (also known as Assyrian and Babylonian)
- Pre-Armenian:
  - Hurro-Urartian languages
  - Aramaic (Assyrian Neo-Aramaic and Syriac)
- Substrate in Vedic Sanskrit, proposed sources for which include:
  - Bactria–Margiana Archaeological Complex (possible source of Sanskrit vocabulary, language not attested)
  - Harappan language (not attested in readable script; see Indus script)
  - Lullubi language
  - Vedda language
  - Burushaski language
  - Dravidian languages
  - Munda languages
  - Nihali language
  - Tibeto-Burman languages
- Substrates to early undifferentiated or partly-differentiated Indo-European in Western Europe:
  - Old European hydronymy (possibly Indo-European, as originally thought by Krahe)
  - Vasconic substrate hypothesis
  - Tyrsenian languages
- Pre-Greek substrate languages, which may have included:
  - Minoan language (see also Linear A, Cretan hieroglyphs)
  - Eteocretan language (may have been a descendant of Minoan)
  - Eteocypriot language (see also Cypro-Minoan script)
- Pre-Germanic:
  - Germanic substrate hypothesis
- Pre-Celtic languages:
  - Insular Celtic:
    - Goidelic substrate hypothesis
    - For the British Isles, see Celtic settlement of Great Britain and Ireland
  - Continental Celtic:
    - Paleohispanic languages
      - Vasconic languages
        - Proto-Basque
        - Aquitanian language (often thought to be the direct ancestor of Basque)
      - Iberian language
      - Tartessian language (classification as Celtic has been proposed)
- Pre-Italic languages:
  - Tyrsenian languages
    - Etruscan language
    - Raetic language (probably related to Etruscan)
  - Camunic language (probably Raetic)
  - Elymian language (perhaps Indo-European)
  - North Picene language
  - Paleo-Sardinian language (also called Paleosardinian, Protosardic, Nuraghic language)
  - Sicanian language

Other propositions are generally rejected by modern linguists:

- Atlantic (Semitic) languages

== Attested languages ==
Languages attested in inscriptions include the following:

- Tartessian
- Iberian
- Aquitanian
- Etruscan
- Rhaetian
- Camunic
- Lemnian
- North Picene
- Sicanian
- Minoan
- Eteocretan
- Eteocypriot
- Hattic
- Urartian
- Elamite
- Kaskian
- Gutian

== Unattested but hypothesised languages ==
These languages are hypothesised to be related to pre-Indo-European languages:

- Kaskian language (possibly related to Hattic?)
- Paleo-Sardinian
- Paleo-Corsican

== Later Indo-European expansion ==
Further, there have been replacements of Indo-European languages by others, most prominently of most of the Celtic languages by Germanic or Romance varieties because of Roman rule and the invasions of Germanic tribes.

Also, however, languages replaced or engulfed by Indo-European in ancient times must be distinguished from languages replaced or engulfed by Indo-European languages in more recent times. In particular, the vast majority of the major languages spread by colonialism have been Indo-European (the major exceptions being Arabic, Turkish and Mandarin Chinese), which has in the last few centuries led to superficially similar linguistic islands being formed by, for example, indigenous languages of the Americas (now surrounded by English, Spanish, Portuguese, Dutch, and French), as well as of several Uralic languages (such as Mordvin, Udmurt, Mari, Komi etc) and Caucasian languages (such as Circassian, Abkhaz, Nakh-Dagestanian languages etc) now surrounded by Russian. Many creole languages have also arisen based upon Indo-European colonial languages.

== See also ==
- Paleo-European languages
- Paleo-Balkan languages
- Languages of Neolithic Europe
- Pre-Indo-European (disambiguation)
- Pre-Finno-Ugric substrate in Sámi languages

== Bibliography ==
=== Archaeology and culture ===
- Anthony, David with Jennifer Y. Chi (eds., 2009). The Lost World of Old Europe: The Danube Valley, 5000–3500 BC.
- Bogucki, Peter I. and Pam J. Crabtree (eds. 2004). Ancient Europe 8000 BC—1000 AD: An Encyclopedia of the Barbarian World. New York: Charles Scribner's Sons.
- Gimbutas, Marija (1973). Old Europe c. 7000–3500 B.C.: the earliest European cultures before the infiltration of the Indo-European peoples. The Journal of Indo-European Studies 1/1-2. 1-20.
- Tilley, Christopher (1996). An Ethnography of the Neolithic. Early Prehistoric Societies in Southern Scandinavia. Cambridge University Press.

=== Linguistic reconstructions ===
- Bammesberger, Alfred & Theo Vennemann, eds. Languages in Prehistoric Europe. Heidelberg: Carl Winter, 2003.
- Blench, Roger, & Matthew Spriggs, eds. Archaeology and Language. Vol. 1, Theoretical and Methodological Orientations. London/NY: Routeledge, 1997.
- Dolukhanov, Pavel M. “Archaeology and Languages in Prehistoric Northern Eurasia”, Japan Review 15 (2003): 175–186. https://web.archive.org/web/20110721072713/http://shinku.nichibun.ac.jp/jpub/pdf/jr/IJ1507.pdf
- Gimbutas, Marija. The Language of the Goddess: Unearthing the Hidden Symbols of Western Civilization. San Francisco: Harper & Row, 1989.
- Greppin, John and T.L.Markey, eds. When Worlds Collide: The Indo-Europeans and the Pre-Indo-Europeans. Ann Arbor: 1990.
- Haarmann, H. “Ethnicity and language in the ancient Mediterranean”, in A companion to ethnicity in the ancient Mediterranean. Edited by J. McInerney. Wiley Blackwell, 2014, pp. 17–33.
- Kroonen, Guus (ed., 2024) Sub-Indo-European Europe: Problems, Methods, Results, Berlin, Boston: De Gruyter Mouton.
- Lehmann, Winfred P. Pre-Indo-European. Washington, DC: Institute for the Study of Man. 2002. ISBN 0-941694-82-8.
- Mailhammer, Robert. “Diversity vs. Uniformity. Europe before the Arrival of Indo-European Languages”, in The Linguistic Roots of Europe: Origin and Development of European Languages. Edited by Robert Mailhammer & Theo Vennemann. Copenhagen: Museum Tusculanum Press, 2016.
- “Pre-Indo-European”, in Encyclopedia of the Languages of Europe. Edited by Glanville Price. Oxford: Blackwell, 1998. ISBN 978-0-631-22039-8.
- Ringe, Don (January 6, 2009). "The Linguistic Diversity of Aboriginal Europe". Language Log. Mark Liberman.
- Vennemann, Theo. Languages in Prehistoric Europe north of the Alps. https://www.scribd.com/doc/8670/Languages-in-prehistoric-Europe-north-of-the-Alps
- Vennemann, Theo (2008). Linguistic reconstruction in the context of European prehistory. Transactions of the Philological Society. Volume 92, Issue 2, pages 215–284, November 1994
- Woodard, Roger D. (ed., 2008) Ancient Languages of Asia Minor. Cambridge University Press.
- Woodard, Roger D. (2008) Ancient Languages of Europe. Cambridge University Press.
