= Pre-Indo-European =

Pre-Indo-European means "preceding Indo-European languages".

Pre-Indo-European may refer to:

- Pre-Indo-European languages, several (not necessarily related) ancient languages in prehistoric Europe and South Asia before the arrival of Indo-European languages
  - Paleo-European languages, languages spoken in Europe before the spread of the Indo-European languages
- Pre-Proto-Indo-European, theoretical reconstruction of language earlier than the Proto-Indo-European language
- Old Europe (archaeology), a Neolithic culture in southeastern Europe before the arrival of speakers of Indo-European languages

== See also ==
- Pre-Germanic (disambiguation)
- Indo-European (disambiguation)
- Neolithic Europe, the period when Neolithic technology was present in Europe, roughly 7000 BCE to 1700 BCE
- Proto-Indo-European Urheimat hypotheses, proposed homeland of the common ancestor of Indo-European languages
- Pre-Greek substrate, unknown language(s) spoken in prehistoric Greece before the Proto-Greek language
- Vasconic substratum theory, proposal that several Western European languages contain remnants of an old language family of Vasconic languages
