= Paleo-European languages =

European languages prior to the Bronze Age

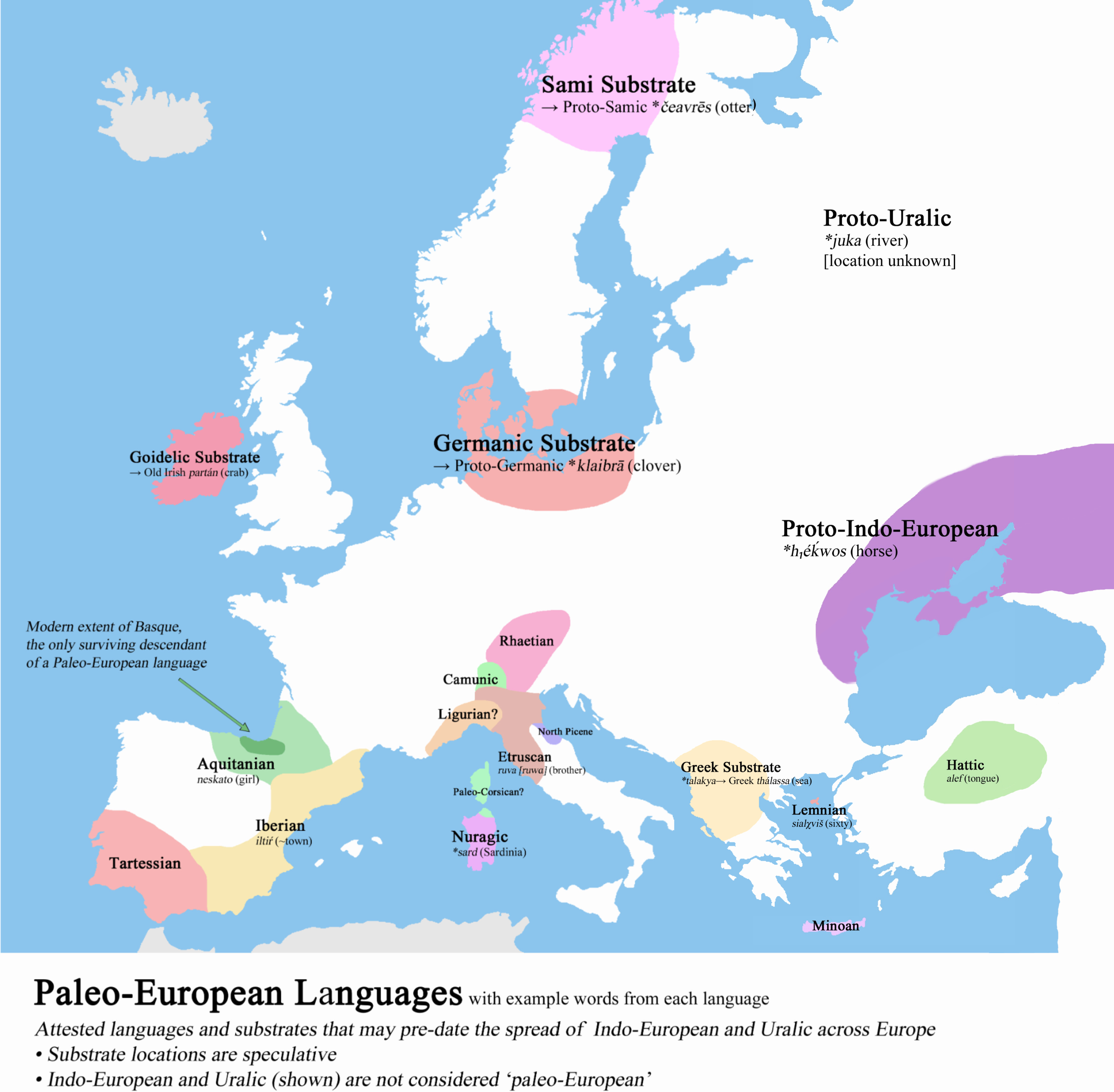
Map of known Paleo-European languages, as well as hypothesized substrate languages

The Paleo-European languages (or Old European languages) are the mostly unknown languages that were spoken in Neolithic (c. 7000 – c. 1700 BC) and Bronze Age Europe (c. 3200 – c. 600 BC) prior to the spread of the Indo-European and Uralic families of languages. The vast majority of modern European populations speak Indo-European languages. However, until the Bronze Age, non-Indo-European languages were predominant across the continent. The speakers of Paleo-European languages gradually assimilated into speech communities dominated by Indo-European speakers, leading to their eventual extinction, except for Basque, which remains the only surviving descendant of a Paleo-European language.

A related term, "Pre-Indo-European", refers more generally to the diverse languages that were spoken in Eurasia before the Indo-European migrations. This category thus includes certain Paleo-European languages (apart from those that were replaced by Uralic languages), along with many others from West, Central, and South Asia.

== History ==
=== Linguistic situation in the Neolithic ===
Until the Bronze Age, the balance between non-Indo-European and Indo-European languages in Europe was the reverse of what it is today, with Paleo-European languages of non-Indo-European affiliation dominating the linguistic landscape.

Linguist Donald Ringe, using general principles of language geography for tribal, pre-state societies and the limited data on known non-Indo-European languages, suggests that Neolithic Europe had a highly diverse linguistic landscape, with many language families having no recoverable linguistic links to one another, much like western North America before European colonisation. He believes the Mediterranean coastal region was home to numerous languages and language families, while the Atlantic coast (including the British Isles) had somewhat less but still significant diversity. The interior of the continent probably showed moderate linguistic diversity, except likely in the Alps and the mountainous areas of the Balkan Peninsula. In contrast, Scandinavia probably had relatively little linguistic variety. Ringe estimates that there may have been around 60 languages in Europe at that time, belonging to approximately 40 language families and 30 stocks. Archeologist David W. Anthony postulates that there could have been between 20 and 40 "language communities" in Europe during the late Neolithic period.

=== Indo-European and Uralic migrations ===
According to the widely held Kurgan hypothesis, speakers of Indo-European languages migrated into the European continent from a homeland located in the Pontic steppe during the 3rd millennium BC, gradually replacing the existing Paleo-European languages. While substantial migrations of Indo-European speaking peoples cannot be ruled out, the scenario of large-scale population replacements is unlikely; smaller groups with economic or political influence may have caused Paleo-European speakers to adopt their language over generations. In this process, speakers of Paleo-European languages were gradually absorbed into speech communities dominated by Indo-European languages. With the sole exception of Basque, these Paleo-European languages declined under the pressure of Indo-Europeanization and eventually became extinct.

In northern Europe, Uralic languages spread into Scandinavia and the Baltic region from the east. The Sami languages are part of the Uralic family but show significant substrate influence from one or more extinct older languages. It is estimated that the ancestors of the Sami adopted a Uralic language less than 2,500 years ago. There are also some traces of indigenous languages from the Baltics in the Finnic languages, though these are much more modest. Additionally, other Uralic languages in Europe have borrowed early loanwords from unidentified non-Indo-European languages.

== Paleo-European languages and reconstructed substrates ==
=== Paleohispanic languages ===
- Vasconic languages
  - Aquitanian – a close relative, perhaps a direct ancestor, of modern Basque.
  - Proto-Basque – the ancestral form of Basque reconstructed from the attested Basque dialects.
    - Basque (Euskara) – the only surviving Paleo-European language.
  - ? Iberian – perhaps a relative to Aquitanian and Basque, but not confirmed.
- Tartessian – unclassified; possibly related to Iberian, if not related to Indo-European.

Other Paleohispanic languages can only be identified indirectly through toponyms, anthroponyms or theonyms cited by Roman and Greek sources. Most inscriptions were found written in the Phoenician or Greek alphabets. Little or no evidence of paleo-alphabets or hieroglyphics is found today; the little material that exists is mostly indecipherable.

=== Italian peninsula ===
- Tyrsenian languages
  - Etruscan – in northern and central Italy
  - Raetic – in northern Italy and Austria
  - Lemnian – in Aegean area. Linguistic evidence points to a relationship with Tyrsenian languages, although it is unclear how Lemnian came to be spoken in this area.
  - ? Camunic – may belong to the Tyrsenian languages, although evidence is limited.
- Paleo-Corsican
- Paleo-Sardinian
- North Picene – alternatively it may be an Indo-European language, or a hoax.
- Sicanian
- Elymian – known from some coins and epigraphical fragments from Sicily.

=== Aegean area ===
- Pre-Greek substrate – Ancient Greek was influenced by at least one non-Indo-European substrate; debate remains as to whether Greek words of Anatolian origin should be interpreted as the result of later borrowing or as evidence for an Indo-European (Anatolian) substrate in Greece.
- Minoan – the language of the Linear A script.
- Eteocretan – may be a descendant of Minoan, but this is uncertain.
- Cypro-Minoan
- Eteocypriot – may be a descendant of Cypro-Minoan
- Language of the Phaistos Disc – possibly one of the above

=== Northern Europe ===
- Germanic substrate hypothesis
- Britain and Ireland
  - Goidelic substrate hypothesis
- Pre-Finno-Ugric substrate
  - Pre-Sami substrate(s) – one or more substrate languages underlying the Sami languages, perhaps based on geographical location
    - Palaeo-Laplandic
  - Pre-Finnic substrate – underlies the development of Proto-Finnic; possibly related to the substrate in Sami

=== Other ===
- Vasconic substrate hypothesis
- Pre-Albanian substrate – possibly related to the substrate in Greek

== See also ==
- Old Europe (archaeology)
