= Atlantic languages (Afroasiatic) =

Disputed Pre-Indo-European Language Family

The Atlantic languages of "Semitidic" (para-Semitic) origin are a disputed concept in historical linguistics put forward by Theo Vennemann. He proposed that Semitidic language speakers occupied regions in Europe thousands of years ago, and influenced the later European languages (Indo-European) which were not part of the Afroasiatic (Hamito-Semitic) family. The theory has found no notable acceptance among linguists or other relevant scholars and is criticised as being based on sparse and often-misinterpreted data.

== Theory and argumentation ==
According to Vennemann, Afroasiatic seafarers settled the European Atlantic coast and are associated with the European megalithic culture. He argued that speakers of "Atlantic" (or "Semitidic") founded coastal colonies from the 5th millennium BC, and left a superstratum in the Germanic languages and a substratum in the development of Insular Celtic. Thus, "Atlantic" influenced the lexicon and the structure of Germanic and the structure of Insular Celtic. According to Vennemann, migrating Indo-European speakers encountered non-Indo-European speakers in Northern Europe, who had already named rivers, mountains, and settlements in a language that he called "Vasconic". He considered some toponyms on the Atlantic coast to be neither Vasconic nor Indo-European, but to have derived from languages that were related to the Mediterranean Hamito-Semitic group.

Vennemann based his theory on the claim that Germanic words without cognates in other Indo-European languages very often belong to semantic fields that are typical for loanwords from a superstratum language, such as warfare, law and communal life. Likewise, he proposed Hamito-Semitic etymologies for words of unknown or disputed origin; for instance, he related the word bee to Egyptian bj-t or the name Éire (Ireland), older *īwerijū to *ʼj-wrʼ(m), 'island (of) copper', as in Akkadian weriʼum 'copper'.

Other evidence for a Semitidic superstratum included a Semitidic influence on the Germanic form of the Indo-European ablaut system and similarities between Germanic paganism and Mesopotamian mythology, such as the parallelism between Freyja and Ishtar, goddesses of war and love.

The idea of a connection between Insular Celtic and Afroasiatic goes back to John Davies (1632) but was expanded by John Morris-Jones in 1913 and was developed further by Vennemann. The position is supported by Julius Pokorny (1927–1949), and Vennemann identified Phoenicians as the likely people. A key factor was the dominant verb-initial word order in Insular Celtic, compared to other Indo-European languages, together with lexical correspondences. Another important factor was the identification of the people later known as Picts. Vennemann held the position that they spoke an Atlantic language, a belief also held by Heinrich Zimmer (1898). Much of the evidence for this view came from toponymy; Vennemann, for example, proposed that the Scottish place-name element Pit- (as in Pitlochry) represented a Proto-Semitic word pitt- ("area: region"). In mainstream academia, Pictish is broadly accepted as Insular Celtic, and most probably Brittonic.

== Criticism ==
Hayim Y. Sheynin, adjunct professor of Jewish Literature at Gratz College, critically reviewed the work Europa Vasconica – Europa Semitica (2003) in which Vennemann laid out his arguments for the existence of a Hamito-Semitic or "Semitidic" superstratum in the Germanic languages. Sheynin concluded that Vennemann's arguments were unacceptable on several grounds. He noted that Vennemann based important parts of his main claim on long-outdated and critically rejected literature, that many of the words presented by Vennemann as evidence of an Atlantic (Semitidic) superstratum were nothing more than "mere ad hoc sound similarities" and that Vennemann's claims made in reference to Semitic range from "objectionable" to "ridiculous". In summary, Sheynin concludes "that [Vennemann] failed in this book not only as comparative linguist, or etymologist, but even in his narrow specialization as a Germanist.... In short, we consider the book a complete failure".

The book was also reviewed by Baldi & Page (2006). They also were critical of his Germanic part of the theory. Since there are no Phoenician inscriptions in Britain, if traders visited the island, the Insular Celtic part of the theory depended on linguistic evidence. The 5th millennium is very early for Celtic-speakers in Britain, compared with other theories, and Mallory (1989) suggested a date of around 1000 BC. Vennemann's view of the establishment of megaliths is not supported by mainstream archaeologists, who view their construction as having a widespread local origin along Oceanic Europe or one that spread from Portugal long before the Bell Beaker or any possible Cardium culture influences from the Mediterranean. Eska (1994) argues that the change from verb-noninitial word order in Continental Celtic to verb-initial in Insular Celtic is internally motivated. Baldi & Page (2006) stated that the strength of Vennemann's proposals lies in his lexical arguments, which merited serious consideration. The origin of the Picts is unknown: see discussions by Jackson (1955) and by Wainwright (1955), as well as those by Kitson (1996) and by Forsyth (1997). Since about 2000, it has been generally held that Pictish is Indo-European (and clear evidence of Pre-Indo-European elements is absent).

== See also ==
- Atlantean
- Atlantic Bronze Age
- Goidelic substrate hypothesis
- Germanic substrate hypothesis
- Irish syntax
- Paleo-European languages
