= Pan-Illyrian hypotheses =

Pan-Illyrian hypotheses or pan-Illyrian theories were proposed in the first half the twentieth century by philologists who thought that traces of Illyrian languages could be found in several parts of Europe, outside the Balkan area. Such ideas have been collectively termed pan-Illyrianism or pan-Illyrism.

== First attempt ==
Pan-Illyrism had both archaeological and linguistic components. Archaeologists were looking for an ethnicity for the Lusatian culture, and linguists for the source of the Old European river names. First, French scholars pressed the case for an association with the Ligurians and Celts, while German prehistorians and linguists, beginning with Gustaf Kossinna, and following Julius Pokorny and Hans Krahe, later linked the Illyrians with the Lusatian culture and Old European hydronyms. One of Kossinna's hypotheses suggested that at the time of the Hallstatt culture, which followed the Bronze Age in Central Europe (and is generally regarded as Proto-Celtic or early Celtic), a hypothetical Illyrian civilization in the middle Danube Valley was technologically more advanced than that of the early Celts to their immediate west, and elements of the Illyrians' material culture found their way into the original Celtic heartland (Hallstatt), as well as the easternmost Germanic tribes. According to Kossinna, the earliest use of iron in Central Europe might be attributed to the Illyrians rather than the Proto-Celts.

Julius Pokorny located the Urheimat between the Weser and the Vistula and east from that region where migration began around 2400 BC. Pokorny suggested that Illyrian elements were to be found in much of the continental Europe and also in the British Isles.

Pokorny's hypothesis was influenced, in part, by contemporary archaeological theories in Germany and was supported by contemporary toponymic specialists, such as Max Vasmer, and Hans Krahe.

== Krahe's version ==
In his 1937 work, Hans Krahe discussed the Venetic language, known from hundreds of inscriptions as an Illyrian language, which forms the separate Illyrian branch of the Indo-European language family with the Messapic language of southern Italy and the Illyrian spoken in the Balkans. Krahe thought that only the name of the Illyrian and Adriatic Enetos peoples were the same. Homer mentions a people in Asia Minor, the Paphlagonians, as coming from the Enetai province, and a few hundred years later Herodotus refers to the Enetos people twice, once as Illyrian and again as the occupants of the Adriatic sea. Krahe thought that the name of the Illyrian and Adriatic Enetos peoples are the same and if Adriatic Enetos were Venets and Venets were the Veneds mentioned in other sources then Illyrian and Veneds were the same people. The basis of this hypothesis is not only the similarity of the tribal and place names, but most of all the water names of the Baltic and the Adriatic (Odra, Drava, Drama, Drweca, Opawa, Notec, etc.). Having the model of Illyrian in mind, he assumed that together these elements represented the remnant of one archaic language.

The problem was that the names of the Venets and Veneds, and similar ethnonyms, are scattered over a huge territory, from the British Isles to the Baltic Sea and from Northern Italy to the Southern Balkans. Since no trace of Illyrians remains in the Northern zone, the Venets (or Veneds) became the transmitter of the Illyrian place-names and by the end of World War II, the Illyrians had come to be held responsible for a vast web of Indo-European place names, spreading from Ireland and Gaul to the Balkan Peninsula.

By 1950, many of the onomastic irregularities once dubbed Illyrian had now become labeled "Old European". First, Krahe presented the view that the Veneti language forms a separate branch in itself. He noticed that the Illyrian language was attested only in some Messapic inscriptions and a number of place and other proper names. From this small amount of linguistic material, he concluded that Illyrian was a Centum language, and that its relationship with Germanic, Italic, and Celtic languages lie in that territory of the Urheimat of this language correlated solely with the Lusatian culture. In Krahe's words: "All of them – the Illyrians, the Italic, and the Venet have ... clear connections to the Germans, that is they came from the north ... and later moved to the south." This meant that the people of the Lusatian culture would have advanced to the eastern part of the Alps to the historical territory of the Illyrians around 1200 BC.

Following Krahe's work, János Harmatta placed Illyrians in South Germany and the Alpine region. Tribes living there would have spoken Illyrian which differed from Latinate, Celtic, Germanic, and Venetic. Around 1300 BC, the people of the Barrow-mound culture, the Illyrians, would have moved eastwards and then southwards along the Danube ("the first Illyr migration"); and in 750 BC the people of the Hallstatt C culture would have expanded toward western Hungary ("the second Illyr migration") and gathered Pannonian tribes to themselves. 1000 BC is considered the beginning of the historical peoples we call the Illyrians.

In his later work, Krahe substituted Pokorny's hypothesis with that of Old European hydronymy, a network of names of water courses dating back to the Bronze Age and to a time before Indo-European languages had split and developed in central, northern, and western Europe. He examined the layers of European water names and did so using two thesis. The first was that the oldest layer will always be the one that can not be explained with the language of the people who currently live on the banks or shores of the given water, and/or consist of a monosyllabic stem carrying a meaning (at times derived or conjugated monosyllabic words). He found that these monosyllabic water names give a system which he called Alteuropäisch ('Old European'). The network of old European water names comprises waters from Scandinavia to lower Italy, and from the British Isles to the Baltic. It denotes the period of development of the common Indo-European language which was finished by the second millennium BC. Krahe's second thesis was that by this time, the Western languages (Germanic, Celtic, Illyrian, the so-called Italic group – the Latin–Faliscan and the Oscan–Umbrian – along with Venetic–Baltic, and to some extent Slavic) had already dissociated from the ancient Proto-Indo-European language, though he considered that they still constituted a uniform Old European language continuum. The similarities in European hydronyms resulted from the radiation of this Old European system, and not from the resemblance of the common words in the later separate languages.

== Other versions ==
While many scholars placed Illyrian in North Europe other scholars extended the territory of the Illyrian people in the south too (Giuliano Bonfante, Vladimir I. Georgiev, etc.). One of them, Georgiev, claimed that "the Pelasg, that is the people before the Hellas Greeks, were Illyrian". Their language would have been Indo-European, more specifically a dialect of the Illyrian-Thracian language, and Etruscan was a later dialect of the latter. The Thracians and Illyrians would have been the link between the central (Italic, Greek, Aryan) and the southern (Pelasg, Luwiy, Hittite) Indo-European groups. Georgiev's hypothesis however, received a lot of criticism and was not widely accepted.

== Criticism ==
The Pan-Illyrian hypothesis received much criticism, and one of the many critiques was that of Antonio Tovar, who demonstrated that the majority of hydronyms in the north of Europe had a non-Indo-European origin – an idea that Krahe dismissed, but was later reiterated by Theo Vennemann in his Vasconic substrate hypothesis.

The Pan-Illyrian hypothesis began with archaeological findings also its end coincided with it. As Radoslav Katičić linguistically restricted what is to be considered Illyrian, newer archeological investigations made by Alojz Benac and B. Čović, archaeologists from Sarajevo, demonstrated that there was unbroken continuation of cultural development between Bronze and Iron Age archeological material, therefore ethnical continuation, too. This created the "autochthonous Illyrian" hypothesis, by which Illyrian culture was formed in the same place (Western Balkans) from older Bronze Age cultures.

According to Benac, the Urnfield culture bearers and proto-Illyrians were different people. Moreover, he claimed that the Urnfield culture migration might have caused several other population movements (e.g. Dorian migration). This hypothesis was supported by Albanian archaeologists and Aleksandar Stipčević, who says that the most convincing hypothesis for the genesis of the Illyrians was the one given by Benac; but pointing to Liburnians and their pre-Indo-European and Mediterranean phases in development, Stipčević claims that there was no equal processing of Illyrian origin in the different areas of the Western Balkans.

== See also ==
- Illyrian languages

== Sources ==
- Benac, Alojz (1964). Symposium sur la Délimitation Territoriale et Chronologique des Illyriens à l'Epoque Préhistorique. Sarajevo: Naučno društvo SR Bosne i Hercegovine.
- Best, Jan G. P.; de Vries, Nanny M. W.; Henri Frankfort Foundation (1982). Interaction and Acculturation in the Mediterranean: Proceedings of the Second International Congress of Mediterranean Pre- and Protohistory, Amsterdam, 19–23 November 1980. John Benjamins Publishing Company. ISBN 90-6032-195-2.
- Harmatta, János (1967). "Zum Illyrischen". Acta Antiqua Academiae Scientiarum Hungaricae. 15: 231–234.
- Katičić, Radoslav (1965). "Zur Frage der keltischen und pannonischen Namengebiete im römischen Dalmatien". Godisnjak (Annuaire). 3. Sarajevo: Centar za balkanoloske studije: 53–76.
- Katičić, Radoslav (1976). Ancient Languages of the Balkans, Part One. Paris: Mouton. ISBN 0-902993-30-5.
- Kossinna, Gustaf (1902). "Die indogermanische Frage archäologisch beantwortet". Zeitschrift für Ethnologie. 34: 161–222.
- Krahe, Hans (1925). Die alten balkanillyrischen geographischen namen auf grund von autoren und inschriften. C. Winter.
- Krahe, Hans (1929). Lexikon altillyrischen Personennamen.
- Krahe, Hans (1950). "Das Venetische: seine Stellung im Kreise der verwandten Sprachen". Sitzungsberichte der Heidelberger Akademie der Wissenschaften, Philosophisch-Historische Klasse. 3: 1–37.
- Krahe, Hans (1955). Die Sprache der Illyrier. Erster Teil: Die Quellen.
- Krahe, Hans (1962). "Die Struktur der alteuropäischen Hydronomie". Abhandlungen der Geistes- und Sozialwissenschaftlichen Klasse. 5: 285–341.
- Krahe, Hans (1964). Unsere ältesten Flussnamen. O. Harrassowitz.
- Mayer, Anton (1957). Die Sprache der alten Illyrier, Volume 1. In Kommission bei R. M. Rohrer.
- Pokorny, Julius (1936). "Substrattheorie und Urheimat der Indogermanen". Mitteilungen der Anthropologischen Gesellschaft. 66: 69–91.
- Skënder, Anamali (1969). Iliret dhe gjeneza e shqiptareve, sesion shkencor, 3–4 Mars 1969. Universiteti Shteteror i Tiranes, Instituti i Historise dhe i Gjuhesise.
- Stipčević, Alexander (1989). Iliri: povijest, život, kultura. Zagreb: Školska knjiga. ISBN 9788603991062.
- Tovar, Antonio (1977). Krahes alteuropäische Hydronymie und die westindogermanischen Sprache. Winter. ISBN 3-533-02586-1.
- Vasmer, Max (1928). "Beitrage zur alten Geographie der Gebiete zwischen lbe und Weischel". Zeitschrift für slavische Philologie. 5: 360–370.
- Vennemann, Theo; Hanna, Patrizia Noel Aziz (2003). Europa Vasconica, Europa Semitica (Trends in Linguistics: Studies and Monographs). Walter de Gruyter. ISBN 3-11-017054-X.
- Wilkes, John J. (1995). The Illyrians. Oxford: Blackwell Publishing. ISBN 0-631-19807-5.
