= Pre-Germanic =

Pre-Germanic may refer to

- the predecessor of Common Germanic, see Germanic parent language
- a language spoken before the arrival of Germanic speakers during the Migration period, see
  - Germanic substrate hypothesis
  - Pre-Indo-European (disambiguation)
