= Old European hydronymy =

Oldest reconstructed stratum of European hydronymy

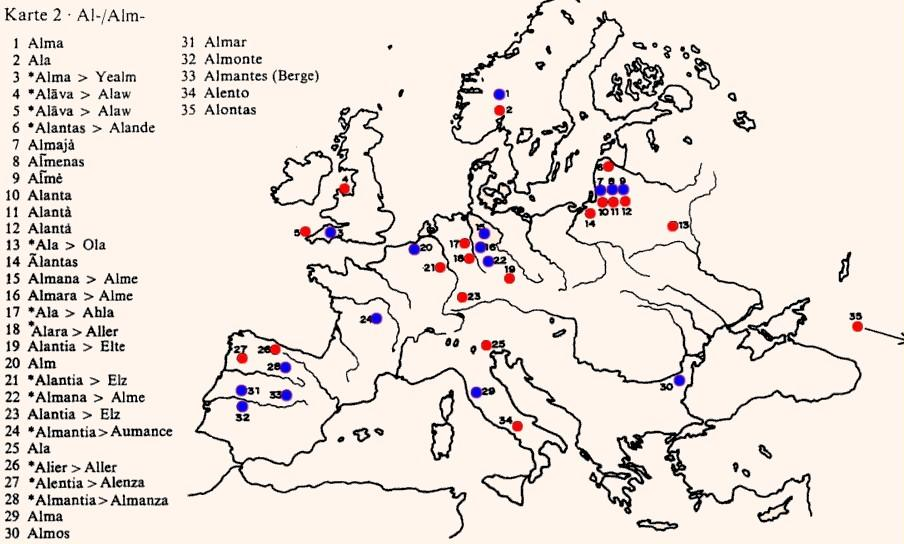
Old European hydronymic map for the root *al-, *alm-

Old European (German: Alteuropäisch) is the term used by Hans Krahe (1964) for the language of the oldest reconstructed stratum of European hydronymy (river names) in Central and Western Europe. (Note: "Old European" in this sense is not to be confused with the term as used by Marija Gimbutas who applies it to non-Indo-European or pre-Indo-European Neolithic Europe.)

== Geography ==
Krahe writes in A1, chapter III, "Introducing preface" Number 2 that the old European hydronomy extended from Scandinavia to South Italy, from Western Europe including the British Isles to the Baltic countries. Of the three Mediterranean peninsulas, Italy was most completely included, whilst the Balkan Peninsula was only scarcely covered. He writes that what he presents for hydronomy also applies to mountains and ranges of mountains, and continues with "Karpaten" and "Karawanken", certainly within the Slavic settlement area, omitting the Bavarian/Austrian "Karwendel" though. This area is associated with the spread of the later "Western" Indo-European dialects, the Celtic, Italic, Germanic, Baltic, and Illyrian branches. Notably exempt is Greece.

Krahe located the geographical nucleus of this area as stretching from the Baltic across Western Poland and Germany to the Swiss Plateau and the upper Danube north of the Alps, while he considered the Old European river names of southern France, Italy and Spain to be later imports, replacing "Aegean-Pelasgian" and Iberian substrates, corresponding to Italic, Celtic and Illyrian "invasions" from about 1300 BC.

== Origins of names ==
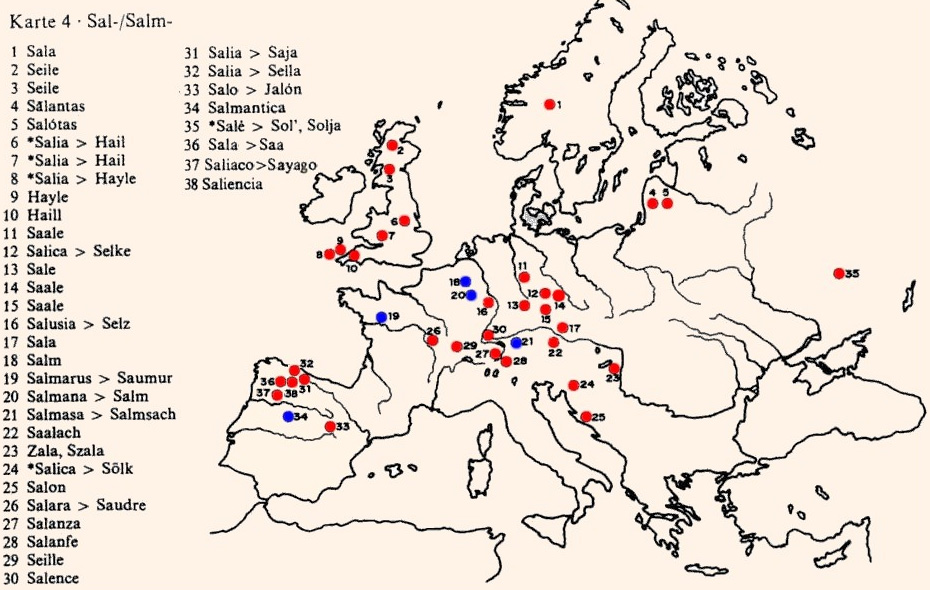
Old European hydronymic map for the root *Sal-, *Salm-

Krahe continues in III A 5, "Geographic Area and age of the paleoeuropean hydronomy", that the overwhelming majority of river and stream names originate from words that in the historical single languages cannot be found or cannot be found anymore. He uses mainly Indo-European roots to allow the river names in question to speak (rule 1), of which more than ten thousand are listed.

In III A 2, "Etymology and Semasiology of the paleoeuropean river names", Krahe states that the oldest strata are composed by prerequisites of nature and that the river names especially refer to the water itself (rule 2), and that words referring to humans and culture are newer. Both rules are important arguments for considering the old European hydronomy of southern France and the north of the Iberian Peninsula as a result of secondary implementation (A 1, number 3) due to a postulated immigration about 1300 BC.

In "Morphology of Paleoeuropean river names" (III A 1, number 3), Krahe concentrates on suffixes (simples and multiples) and distinguishes eleven different ones in a table. He attributes geographical (Central European vs. South European or Eastern), functional (for example affluent) or temporal (before or after a change of consonants or vowels) functions to the suffixes of the river names (rule 3). For the temporal function he claims the existence of a system of phonetic changes (Lautverschiebung), however he does not include prefixes in his considerations.

== Krahe's influence on other scholars ==
Krahe has influenced archaeologists, linguists and particularly experts in Celtic languages:

Marija Gimbutas (Lithuanian: Marija Gimbutienė) studied in Tübingen, and received her doctorate of archeology in 1946 in the same department where Krahe lectured. Gimbutas developed the Kurgan theory.

Jürgen Untermann, a disciple of Krahe, whose dissertation was written in 1954 in Tübingen was professor for comparative linguistics at the University of Cologne. He was an epigraphist and Indoeuropeanist.

Antonio Tovar, with preliminary studies in Berlin, later professor of the University of Salamanca, was professor for Comparative Linguistics in Tübingen from 1967 to 1979. Together with Manuel Agud and Koldo Mitxelena he prepared an etymological dictionary of the Basque language.

== Other authors ==
Other authors concerned with old European hydronomy are listed below.

Xavier Delamarre is a French linguist whose standard work is Dictionnaire de la langue gauloise: Une approche linguistique du vieux-celtique continental ('Dictionary of the Gaulish language: A linguistic approach to continental old Celtic'; 2nd edition, 2003). This is the most comprehensive publication on Gaulish words, with more than 800 terms in alphabetical order, derived from Gaulish–Greek, Gaulish–Etruscan, Gaulish–Latin, or solely Gaulish inscriptions, printed classical languages, coins, and some terms of Celtic substrate in Occitan. He presents all cases of appearance of toponyms and hydronyms in question, cites authors and roots, showing alternatives, and classifies, if necessary, as uncertain or questionable. He shows all river name examples with prefixes. For example, see "comparison of old hydronyms" adding "water", "clear", "hard stone", etc.

The German linguist Theo Vennemann suggested in 2003 that the language of Old European hydronyms was agglutinative and Pre-Indo-European. This theory has been criticised as being seriously flawed, and the opinion accepted more generally is that hydronyms are of Indo-European origin.

The Spanish philologist Francisco Villar Liébana argued in 1990 for Old European preserved in river names and confined to the hydronymic substratum in the Iberian Peninsula as yet another Indo-European layer with no immediate relationship to the Lusitanian language. However, the idea of "Old European" was criticized by Untermann in 1999 and De Hoz in 2001. Villar Liébana advocated the theories of Gimbutas against those of Colin Renfrew. In his work Indoeuropeos y No Indoeuropeos en la Hispania Prerromana ('Indo-Europeans and Non-Indo-Europeans in Pre-Roman Hispania') he presents a nine-root "series" and a few more collective "series", mainly of toponyms (Hispanic and non-Hispanic) but also including hydronyms. For example, in chapter IV B VII, Villar Liébana discusses hydronyms of the series uba starting with Maenuba (Pliny 3.8) = modern Vélez; and, with the same name, a tributary of the Baetis (Pliny 3.11) = Guadiamar, Salduba (close to Málaga). He compares modern rivers names like Ubia, Ove, and Fonte dos Ovos with Danube, Corduba (modern Córdoba, Andalusia), and others. Wherever uba appears, as in the rivers Saruba = modern Saar (river) (an affluent of the river Mosel), Fuente Sarobals (in Huesca), and Sarrubian (Huesca), he acknowledges only uba and not the root dan in Danubius (corresponding to Danube, Dnieper, and Dniester) or the root sar in others, which are all Indo-European roots.

== Examples ==
An example is the old river name Isar:

- Isar > Isar (Bavaria)
- Isar > Isère (France)
- Isar > Oise (France)
- Isar > Yzeron (France)
- Isar > Jizera (Czech Republic)
- Izera > Izera (Poland)
- Isar > Aire (Yorkshire)
- Isar > Yser (Belgium)
- Isar > Issel (Germany)
- Isar > IJssel (Netherlands) there are several (parts of) rivers in the Netherlands called IJssel (Yssel), one of which was called "Isala" during Roman times
- Isar > Ézaro (Spain)
- Isar > Ésera (Spain)
- Isar > Iseran (France)
- Isar > Esaro (Italy)
- Isar-ko > Eisack (Italy)
- Isar-na > Isières (Belgium)
- Isar-ellum > Izarillo "little Izar" (Spain)
- Isar > Iza (Romania)

Also relevant might be *ezero (the Slavic word for lake), ežeras (the Lithuanian word for lake), and the Acheron river in Greece.

== See also ==
- Bell Beaker culture
- Germanic substrate hypothesis
- Pan-Illyrian theories
- Pre-Celtic
- Rigvedic rivers
- Tyrsenian languages
- Urnfield culture
- Vasconic substrate hypothesis
