= Germanic substrate hypothesis =

Hypothesis about the history of Germanic languages

The Germanic substrate hypothesis attempts to explain the purportedly distinctive nature of the Germanic languages within the context of the Indo-European languages. Based on the elements of Common Germanic vocabulary and syntax which do not seem to have cognates in other Indo-European languages, it claims that Proto-Germanic may have been either a creole or a contact language that subsumed a non-Indo-European substrate language, or a hybrid of two quite different Indo-European languages, mixing the centum and satem types. Which culture or cultures may have contributed the substrate material is an ongoing subject of academic debate and study.

== Supporters ==
The non-Indo-European substrate hypothesis attempts to explain the anomalous features of Proto-Germanic as a result of creolization between an Indo-European and a non-Indo-European language. A number of root words for modern European words seem to limit the geographical origin of the Germanic influences, such as the root word for ash (the tree), and other environmental references suggest a limited root stream subset, which can be localized to Northern Europe. The non-Indo-European substrate theory was first proposed in 1910 by Sigmund Feist, who estimated that roughly a third of Proto-Germanic lexical items came from a non-Indo-European substrate and that the supposed reduction of the Proto-Germanic inflectional system was the result of pidginization with that substrate.

Germanicist John A. Hawkins set forth in 1990 some more modern arguments for a Germanic substrate. Hawkins argued that the Proto-Germans encountered a non-Indo-European speaking people and borrowed many features from their language. He hypothesizes that the first sound shift of Grimm's law was the result of non-native speakers attempting to pronounce Indo-European sounds and that they resorted to the closest sounds in their own language in their attempt to pronounce them. The American linguist John McWhorter supported essentially the same view in 2008, except considered that it might have been a superstrate instead of substrate situation (i.e., non-Indo-European speakers struggling to learn Indo-European).

Kalevi Wiik, a phonologist, put forward a hypothesis in 2002 that the pre-Germanic substrate was of a non-Indo-European Finnic origin. Wiik claimed that there are similarities between mistakes in English pronunciation typical of Finnish-speakers and the historical sound changes from Proto-Indo-European to Proto-Germanic. Wiik's argument is that only three language groups were widespread in Neolithic Europe: Uralic, Indo-European, and Basque, corresponding to three ice-age refugia. Then, Uralic speakers would have been the first to settle most of Europe, and the language of the Indo-European settlers was influenced by the earlier Uralic population, producing Proto-Germanic.

Existing evidence of languages outside these three refugia (such as the proposed Tyrsenian language family or the undeciphered Vinča symbols) potentially creates a complication for Wiik's hypothesis that Uralic languages dominated the Proto-Germanic Urheimat. Moreover, his interpretation of Indo-European origins differs from that of the academic mainstream. (Note: For instance, he viewed the Tripolye-Cucuteni people as Proto-Indo-European.) On the other hand, the Germanic language family is believed to have dominated in southern Scandinavia for a time before spreading south. This would place it geographically close to the Finnic group during its earliest stages of differentiation from other Indo-European languages, which is consistent with Wiik's hypothesis.

Theo Vennemann put forth the Vasconic substrate hypothesis in 2003, which posits a "Vasconic" substrate (ancestral to Basque) and a Semitic or "Atlantic Semitidic" superstrate in Proto-Germanic. However, his speculations have found little support in or have been outright dismissed by the broader community of academic linguists, especially by historical linguists.

However, some other modern linguists, including McWhorter (2008), have supported (without any Finnic or "Vasconic" connections) the hypothesis of a Semitic superstrate on proto-Germanic – particularly Phoenician/Punic, via primarily maritime contact. The general outline of the idea of Semitic (or more broadly Afroasiatic) influences on northwestern Indo-European languages (including, in different ways, both Germanic and Celtic) long pre-dates McWhorter, Vennemann, Wiik, and Hawkins. It was first proposed by the Welsh lexicographer and translator John Davies in 1632, then revived and developed by Welsh grammarian John Morris-Jones in 1912, and Austrian-Czech philologist Julius Pokorny in 1927 and 1949.

== Grimm's law ==
Hawkins (1990) and McWhorter (2008) both saw Grimm's law as strongly supporting at least a superstrate if not substrate hypothesis, because of the extent of the changes from Proto-Indo-European to Proto-Germanic, which they characterized as likely the results of the struggles of speakers of one language to adapt to an unrelated and very different other one, with the more sibilant-heavy non-IE language's consonantal features being adopted systematically and IE grammar being simplified, especially through loss of most of the case system.

== Linguistic conservatism ==
Not all scholars consider non-Germanic IE languages such as Sanskrit to be linguistically conservative but Germanic innovative. Eduard Prokosch (1939) wrote that "the common Indo-European element seems to predominate more definitely in the Germanic group than anywhere else". In regards to the issue, Edgar C. Polomé (1990) wrote: "Assuming 'pidginization' in Proto-Germanic on account of the alleged 'loss' of a number of features reconstructed by the Neogrammarians as part of the verbal system of Proto-Indo-European ... is a rather specious argument. ... The fairly striking structural resemblance between the verbal system of Germanic and that of Hittite rather makes one wonder whether these languages do not actually represent a more archaic structural model than the further elaborated inflectional patterns of Old Indic and Hellenic."

== Current scholarship ==
In the 21st century, treatments of Proto-Germanic tend to reject or simply omit discussion of the Germanic substrate hypothesis. For instance, Joseph B. Voyles's Early Germanic Grammar makes no mention of the hypothesis. On the other hand, the substrate hypothesis remains popular with the Leiden school of historical linguistics. This group influenced the four-volume Dutch dictionary (2003–2009) — the first etymological dictionary of any Germanic language that systematically integrated the hypothesis into its material.

Guus Kroonen brought up the so-called "Agricultural substrate hypothesis", based on the comparison of a presumably Pre-Germanic and Pre-Greek substrate lexicon (especially agricultural terms without clear IE etymologies). Kroonen links that substrate to the gradual spread of agriculture in Neolithic Europe from Anatolia and the Balkans, and associates the Pre-Germanic "Agricultural" substrate language with the Linear Pottery culture. The prefix *a- and the suffix *-it are the most apparent linguistic markers by which a small group of "Agricultural" substrate words - e.g., *arwīt ('pea') or *gait ('goat') – can be isolated from the rest of the Proto-Germanic lexicon.

== Phonology ==
According to Aljoša Šorgo, there are at least 36 Proto-Germanic lexical items very likely originating from the "Agricultural" substrate language (or a group of closely related languages). It also had the following consonants:

Germanic substrate consonants
		Labial	Dental/ Alveolar	Velar
Nasal		m	n	
Plosive	voiceless	p	t	k
Plosive	voiced prenasalized	ᵐb	ⁿd	ᵑɡ
Fricative			s θ?	x?
Liquid			l r	
Semivowel?		w		

Šorgo proposed that the "Agricultural" substrate was characterized by a four-vowel three-diphthong system of */æ/ */ɑ/ */i/ */u/ */ɑi/ */æu/ */ɑu/, a prosodically mobile stress timed accent, and reduction of unstressed vowels to *[ə] which was often syncopated.

Germanic substrate monophthongs
	Front		Central	Back	
	unrounded	rounded	Central	unrounded	rounded
Close	i				u
Mid/ Open	æ	(ɶ)	(ə)	ɑ	(o)

- /æ, ɑ/ also had rounded allophones *[ɶ, o].

== See also ==
- Ancient Belgian language
- Atlantic (Semitic) languages
- Haplogroup I-M170
- Haplogroup I-M253
- Old Europe (archaeology)
- Germanic parent language
- Goidelic substrate hypothesis
- Language shift
- Old European hydronymy
- Pitted Ware culture
- Pre-Finno-Ugric substrate
- Pre-Greek substrate
- Pre-Indo-European languages
- Scandinavian hunter-gatherer

== Sources ==
- Beekes, Robert S. P. (1995). Comparative Indo-European Linguistics: An Introduction. Amsterdam: John Benjamins. ISBN 1-55619-505-2.
- Kroonen, Guus (2013). Etymological Dictionary of Proto-Germanic. Leiden: Brill.
- Kuzmenko, Yury K. (2011). Ранние Германцы И Их Соседи: Лингвистика, Археология, Генетика [Early Germanics and Their Neighbours: Linguistics, Archaeology, Genetics] (PDF) (in Russian). Saint Petersburg: Russian Academy of Sciences (Institute for Linguistic Studies) / Nestor-History. ISBN 978-5-98187-870-1. Archived from the original (PDF) on 31 January 2012.
- Robinson, Orrin W. (1992). Old English and its Closest Relatives: A Survey of the Earliest Germanic Languages. Stanford University Press. ISBN 0-8047-2221-8.
- Watkins, Calvert, ed. (2000) [1985]. The American Heritage Dictionary of Indo-European Roots (2nd ed.). Boston: Houghton Mifflin. ISBN 0-618-08250-6.
