= Pre-Greek substrate =

Extinct language of prehistoric Greece

The pre-Greek substrate (or substratum) consists of the unknown pre-Greek language or languages (either Pre-Indo-European or other Indo-European languages) spoken in prehistoric Greece prior to the emergence of the Proto-Greek language in the region c. 3200–2200 BC, during the Early Helladic period. About 1,000 words of Greek vocabulary cannot be adequately explained as derivatives from Proto-Greek or Proto-Indo-European, leading to the substratum hypothesis. According to scholars, Ancient Greek was likely influenced by two types of substrates: one Indo-European, probably an unknown Anatolian language that has been called "Parnassian", and one or several non-Indo-European languages that pre-date the coming of Greeks to the region.

== Overview ==
=== Linguistic situation ===
Based upon toponymic and lexical evidence, it is generally assumed that one or several languages were once spoken in both the Greek peninsula and western Asia Minor before Mycenaean Greek and the attested Anatolian languages (Hittite and Luwian) became predominant in the region. Various explanations for this phenomenon have been given by scholars.

One substrate language, whose influence is observable on Ancient Greek and Anatolian languages, is taken by a number of scholars to be an Indo-European language related to the Anatolian Luwian language, and to be responsible for the widespread place-names ending in -ssa and -nda in western Asia Minor, and -ssos and -nthos in mainland Greece. For instance, the name of the mount Parnassos in Greece has been interpreted as the Luwian parna- ('house') attached to the possessive suffix -ssa-. Both Hittite and Luwian texts also attest a place-name Parnassa, which could be related. Philologist Martin L. West has proposed to name this unattested Anatolian language "Parnassian", and has argued for "a parallel movement down from Thrace by a branch of the same people as entered Anatolia, the people who were to appear 1,500 years later as the Luwians". From the distribution of the names, it appears that this language was spoken during the Early Helladic II period, which began around 2800 BC.

However, since many clusters of sounds are possible in both pre-Greek and Indo-European, it is difficult in most cases to distinguish between possible "Parnassian" loanwords and shared pre-Indo-European substrate words. For instance, terms like τολύπη (tolúpē; 'clew, ball of wool ready for spinning') show typical pre-Greek features while being related to Anatolian words (in this case Luwian and Hittite taluppa/i- 'lump, clod') with no other attested Indo-European cognate, suggesting that they were borrowed from the same, probably non-Indo-European, source. Some scholars have thus proposed that at least part of the pre-Greek substrate was brought to Greece by pre-Indo-European settlers from Asia Minor, and that we should distinguish between different layers of loanwords coming successively or concurrently from different families of languages.

While the correlations between Anatolian and Greek placenames may be a strong indication of a common early phase of Indo-European – possibly Anatolian – influence in the area, some pre-Greek loanwords still remain incompatible with Indo-European phonology while showing certain recurrent patterns that set them apart from other languages. This likely indicates that "one language, or a group of closely related dialects or languages" was the source of another, possibly earlier, layer of pre-Indo-European loanwords in the region. Of the few words of secure Anatolian origin, most are cultural items or commodities which are likely the result of commercial exchange, not of a substratum. Some of the relevant vocabulary can also be explained as linguistic exchange between Greek and Anatolian languages across the Aegean Sea without necessarily originating from a change of language.

=== Coming of Proto-Greek ===
Proto-Greek area of settlement (2200/2100–1900 BC) suggested by Katona (2000), Sakellariou (2016, 1980, 1975) and Phylaktopoulos (1975).

Estimates for the introduction of the Proto-Greek language into prehistoric Greece have changed over the course of the 20th century. Since the decipherment of Linear B, searches were made "for earlier breaks in the continuity of the material record that might represent the 'coming of the Greeks'".

The majority of scholars date the coming of Proto-Greek to the transition from Early Helladic II to Early Helladic III (c. 2400−2200/2100 BC), with the diversification into a southern and a northern group beginning by approximately 1700 BC. This has been criticized by John E. Coleman, who argues that this estimate is based on stratigraphic discontinuities at Lerna that other archaeological excavations in Greece suggested were the product of chronological gaps or separate deposit-sequencing instead of cultural changes. Coleman estimates that the entry of Proto-Greek speakers into the Greek peninsula occurred during the late 4th millennium BC (c. 3200 BC) with pre-Greek spoken by the inhabitants of the Late Neolithic II period.

== Reconstruction ==
Although no written texts exist or have been identified as pre-Greek, the phonology and lexicon have been partially reconstructed from the many words borrowed into Greek; such words often show a type of variation not found in inherited Indo-European Greek terms, and certain recurrent patterns that can be used to identify pre-Greek elements.

=== Phonology ===
==== Vowels ====
The pre-Greek language had a simple vowel system, with either three or five monophthongs. This system consisted of either /a/, /e/, /i/, /o/, /u/, or most likely just /a/, /i/, /u/, in which /a/ varied between /a/~/e/~/o/ as a result of palatalization for /e/ and labialization for /o/.

Additionally, it had at least one diphthong (/au/), and it may also have had /ou/, although this is also often explained as the sequence -arʷ- adapted in Greek as -ουρ-, since /ou/ is often seen with an /r/.

==== Consonants ====
The phonology of pre-Greek likely featured a series of both labialized and palatalized consonants, as indicated by Mycenaean inscriptions in Linear B. These features were found not only in stops, but in resonants as well (presumably including even the rare modified approximants /jʷ/ and /wʲ/), which was different from Indo-European languages at the time and is generally considered a rare feature characteristic of pre-Greek.

It is, however, unlikely that voicing or consonantal aspiration were distinctive features, as pre-Greek loanwords in Greek vary freely between plain, voiced and aspirated stops (e.g. ἀσφάραγος/ἀσπάραγος aspháragos/aspáragos, 'asparagus'). The observation of such variants for a particular word is often a strong indication of substrate-derived etymology.

Furthermore, while the existence of word-initial approximants /w/ and /j/ can be safely inferred from common motifs in inherited words (e.g. the ἰα‑ from *ja- in ἴαμβος Ἰάσων) or even retained in early and dialectal forms (e.g. *wa- in the cases of ἄναξ-ϝάναξ, Ὀαξός-ϝαξός, ὑάκινθος-ϝάκινθος), word-initial aspiration probably did not exist, with /h/ considered by Beekes a non-native phoneme in pre-Greek.

The initial consonant σ- /s/ or /z/ is very common in pre-Greek and characteristic when it shows up as an s-mobile.

Consonant phonemes of Pre-Greek as posited by Beekes (2014)
	Labial			Dental, Alveolar			Palatal		Velar		
	plain	palatal	labial	plain	palatal	labial	plain	labial	plain	palatal	labial
Plosive	p	pʲ	pʷ	t	tʲ	tʷ			k	kʲ	kʷ
Nasal	m	(mʲ)	mʷ	n	nʲ	nʷ					
Fricative				s	sʲ	sʷ					
Trill				r	rʲ	rʷ					
Approximant				l	lʲ	lʷ	j	(jʷ)		(wʲ)	w

==== Consonant clusters ====
Certain characteristic consonant clusters associated with pre-Greek phonology as reflected in words inherited into Greek, as listed by Beekes according to their frequency in the PIE language:

Not possible in PIE

- -κχ- /kkʰ/, not possible in PIE, only in pre-Greek (but rare)
- -πφ- /ppʰ/, not possible in PIE, though still very rare in pre-Greek
- -τθ- /ttʰ/, not possible in PIE, common in pre-Greek

Rare in PIE

- -βδ- /bd/, rare in PIE, not as much in pre-Greek
- -γδ- /gd/, rare in PIE, not in pre-Greek
- -δν- /dn/, rare in PIE, not in pre-Greek
- -ρκν- /rkn/, very rare overall and found only in pre-Greek loans
- -σβ- /sb/, very rare and problematic identification in PIE, common in pre-Greek probably from *-sgʷ-
- -σγ- /sg/, rare in PIE, common in pre-Greek perhaps from *-tʲg-
- non word-initial -σκ- /sk/ and -στ- /st/, rare in PIE, somehow common in pre-Greek derivative words
- -χμ- /kʰm/ and -χν- /kʰn/, rare in PIE, sometimes in substrate words
- word-initial ψ- /ps/, extremely common in pre-Greek loans (most words beginning with ψ- being such)

Possible in PIE

- -γν- /gn/, not as rare in both PIE and pre-Greek
- -κτ- /kt/, common in PIE but in pre-Greek also with variants -χθ-, -χτ- etc.
- -μν- /mn/, common in PIE and also in many pre-Greek words
- -ρδ- /rd/, possible in PIE, also found in some pre-Greek words
- -ρν- /rn/, when pre-Greek usually also with variants -ρδ- and -νδ-
- -στλ- /stl/, possible in PIE but more common in substrate words
- -φθ- /pʰtʰ/, possible in PIE but also common in pre-Greek loans

=== Lexicon ===
Various categories of words have been suggested to be pre-Greek (or "Aegean") loanwords:

- Anatomy:
  - αὐχήν aukhḗn, 'neck';
  - λαιμός laimós, 'neck, throat';
  - ῥίς rhī́s, 'nose, snout';
  - σιαγών siagṓn, 'jaw, jawbone';
  - σπόνδυλος/σφόνδυλος spóndylos/sphóndylos, 'vertebra';
  - σφάκελος/σφάκηλος sphákelos/sphákēlos, 'middle finger';
  - ἰχώρ ikhṓr, 'ichor'.
- Animals:
  - αἴλουρος aílouros, 'cat';
  - ἀράχνη arákhnē, 'spider';
  - βόλινθος/βόνασσος bólinthos/bónassos, 'wild ox';
  - κάνθαρος kántharos, 'beetle';
  - κῆτος kêtos, 'whale, sea monster';
  - πελεκῖνος pelekînos, 'pelican';
  - σμίνθος smínthos, 'mouse'.
- Architecture and building materials:
  - ἄργῐλλος/ἄργῑλος/ἄργῐλλα árgillos/árgīlos/árgilla, 'white clay, argil';
  - καλύβη/καλυβός/κολυβός kalýbē/kalybós/kolybós, 'hut, cabin';
  - λαβύρινθος labýrinthos, 'labyrinth';
  - πέτρα pétrā, 'stone (as building material)';
  - πλίνθος plínthos, 'mudbrick';
  - πύργος pýrgos, 'tower'.
- Geography and topography:
  - ἄμβων/ἄμβη ámbōn/ámbē, 'crest of a hill', 'raised edge or protuberance';
  - κρημνός krēmnós, 'edge of a trench, cliff';
  - κορυφή koruphḗ, 'mountain top';
  - ὄχθη ókhthē, 'riverbank';
  - σπέος/σπεῖος spéos/speîos, 'cave, cavern';
  - χαράδρα/χαράδρη kharádra/kharádrē, 'torrent, riverbed, gorge';
- Maritime vocabulary:
  - ἄκατος ákatos, 'small dinghy, skiff'.
  - θάλασσα thálassa, 'sea'.
  - θάλαμος thálamos, 'an inner room or chamber', 'the lowest, darkest part of the ship', 'the hold';
  - θίς thī́s, 'heap of sand, beach, shore, sand at the bottom of the sea';
  - κυβερνάω kybernáō, 'to steer, to be a steerman'.
- Metals and metallurgy:
  - κασσίτερος kassíteros, 'tin';
  - μόλυβδος mólybdos, 'lead';
  - σίδηρος sídēros, 'iron';
  - τάγχουρος/τάγχαρας/ἄγχουρος tánkhouros/tánkharas/ánkhouros, 'gold';
  - χαλκός chalkós, 'copper'.
- Musical instruments:
  - κίθαρις kítharis, 'cithara';
  - λύρα lýra, 'lyre';
  - σάλπιγξ sálpinx, 'trumpet';
  - σύριγξ sýrinx, 'flute';
  - φόρμιγξ phórminx, 'lyre'.
- Mythological characters:
  - Ἀχιλλεύς/Ἀχιλεύς Akhilleús/Akhileús, Achilles;
  - Δαναός Danaós, Danaus;
  - Κάδμος Kádmos, Cadmus;
  - Ὀδυσσεύς Odysseús, Odysseus;
  - Ῥαδάμανθυς Rhadámanthys, Rhadamanthus.
- Plants:
  - ἄμπελος ámpelos, 'vine';
  - ἀψίνθιον apsínthion, 'wormwood' or 'absinthe';
  - ἐλαία elaía, 'olive tree';
  - κισσός kissós, 'ivy';
  - κολοκύνθη/κολοκύνθα/κολοκύνθος/κολοκύντη kolokýnthē/kolokýntha/kolokýnthos/kolokýntē, 'wild gourd';
  - κυπάρισσος kypárissos, 'cypress';
  - μίνθη mínthē, 'mint'
  - σταφυλή staphylḗ, 'grape';
  - σῦκον/τῦκον sŷkon/tŷkon, 'fig'.
- Social practices and institutions:
  - ἅμιλλα hámilla, 'contest, trial, sporting activity';
  - ἀτέμβω atémbō, 'maltreat' or 'to be bereft or cheated of a thing';
  - ϝάναξ/ἄναξ wánax/ánax, 'lord, king';
  - θίασος thíasos, 'thiasus, Bacchic revel';
  - τύραννος týrannos, 'absolute ruler'.
- Theonyms:
  - Ἀπόλλων Apóllōn, Apollo;
  - Ἄρης Arēs, Ares;
  - Ἄρτεμις Ártemis, Artemis;
  - Ἀσκληπιός Asklēpiós, Asclepius;
  - Ἀθήνη Athḗnē, Athena;
  - Ἄτλας Átlās, Atlas;
  - Διόνῡσος Diónȳsos, Dionysus;
  - Ἑρμῆς Hermês, Hermes;
  - Ἥφαιστος Hḗphaistos, Hephaestus;
  - Ἰαπετός Īapetós, Iapetus.
- Tools related to agricultural activities:
  - δίκελλα díkella, 'adze, pickaxe';
  - κάμαξ kámax, 'vine pole';
  - μάκελλα mákella, 'mattock, pick';
  - χαλινός khalīnós, 'bridle, rein'.
- Toponyms/placenames:
  - -νθ-, -nth- (e.g. Κόρινθος Kórinthos, Corinth; Ζάκυνθος Zákynthos, Zakynthos);
  - -σσ-, -ss- (e.g. Παρνασσός Parnassós, Parnassus);
  - -ττ-, -tt- (e.g. Ἀττική Attikḗ, Attica; Ὑμηττός Hymēttós, Hymettus);
  - region names e.g. Ἀχαΐα Achaíā, Achaea; Λακωνία Lakōníā, Laconia; Μαγνησία Magnēsíā, Magnesia;
  - city names e.g. Δωδώνη Dōdṓnē, Dodona; Κνωσσός Knōssós, Knossos; Κυδωνία Kydōníā, Cydonia;
  - isles e.g. Κρήτη Krḗtē, Crete; Νάξος Náxos, Naxos;
  - mountain names e.g.Ὄλυμπος Ólympos, Olympus; Πίνδος Píndos, Pindus;
  - hydronyms e.g. Ἀχελῷος Akhelôios, Achelous; Γέλας Gélās, Gela; Ἰλισός Īlīsós, Ilisos;
  - other geographical features e.g. Σούνιον Soúnion, Sounion;
  - mythological locations e.g. Ἠλύσιον Ēlýsion, Elysium.
- Use of domestic species:
  - ἔλαιον élaion, 'olive oil';
  - λήκυθος lḗkythos, 'oil-flask';
  - κάνθων kánthōn, 'pack-ass';
  - στέμφυλον stémphylon, 'mass of olives from which the oil has been pressed, mass of pressed grapes'.
- Weapons and armor:
  - θώραξ thṓrax, 'breastplate';
  - μάστιξ mástīx, 'whip';
  - ὑσσός hyssós, 'javelin'.
- Weaving:
  - ἀρύβαλλος arýballos, 'flask';
  - βρόχος brókhos, 'slip knot, mesh';
  - ἠλακάτη ēlakátē, 'spindle';
  - μύρινθος mýrinthos, 'cord'.

== Anatolian loanwords ==
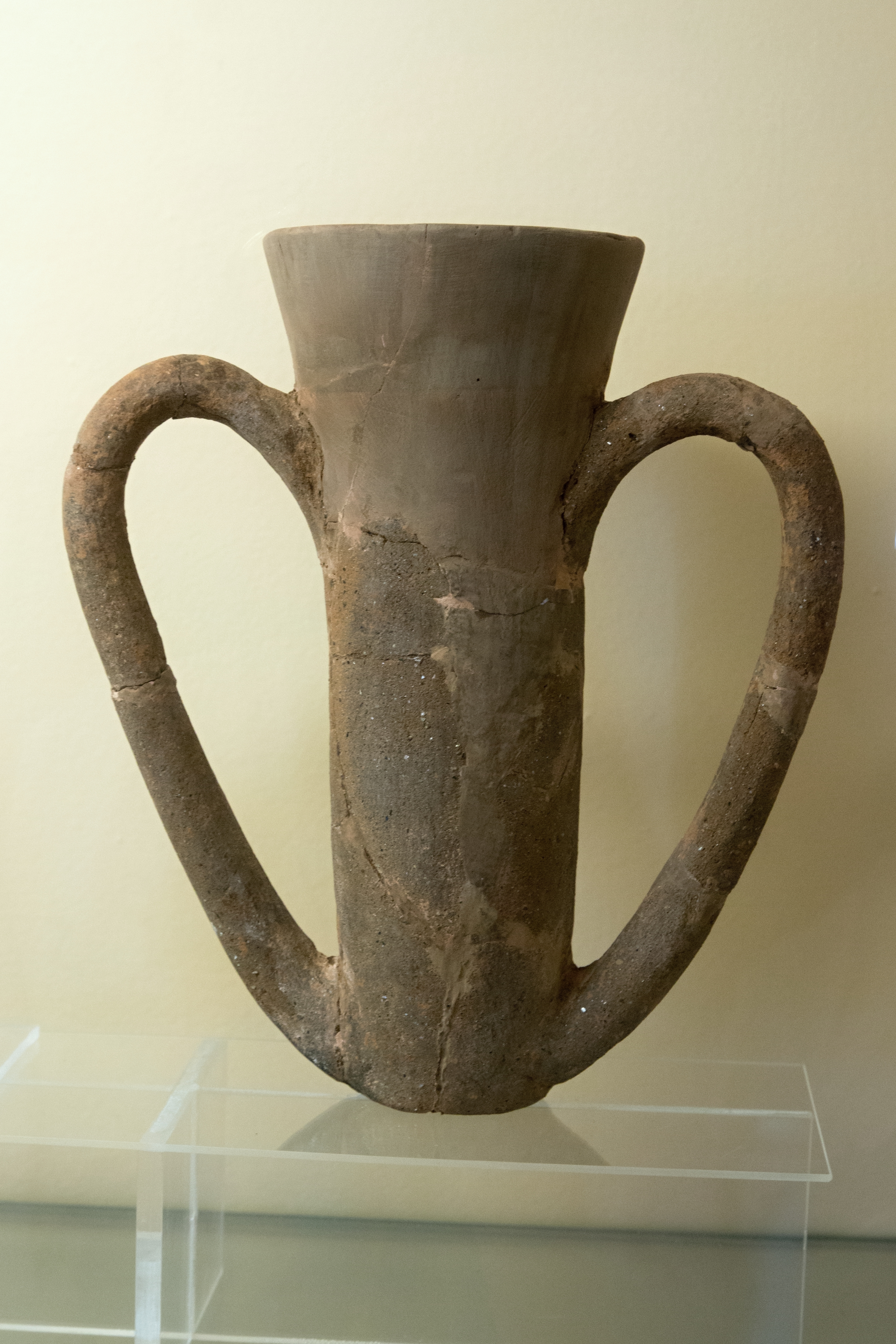
Anatolian-style depas cup, 23rd century BC; its name is believed to be a Luwian loanword

Possible Anatolian or "Parnassian" loanwords include:

- Ἀπόλλων Apóllōn (Doric Greek: Apéllōn, Arcadocypriot Greek: Apeílōn), from *Apeljōn, as in Hittite: Appaliunaš;
- δέπας dépas, 'cup; pot, vessel', Mycenaean Greek: di-pa, related to Hieroglyphic Luwian: ti-pa-s 'sky; bowl, cup' (cf. Hittite: nēpis 'sky; cup');
- ἐλέφας eléphās, 'ivory', related to Hittite: laḫpa (itself from Mesopotamia; cf. Phoenician: ʾlp, Ancient Egyptian: ꜣbw);
- κύανος kýanos, 'dark blue glaze; enamel', related to Hittite: kuwannan- 'copper ore; azurite' (ultimately from Sumerian: kù-an);
- κύμβαχος kýmbachos, 'helmet', related to Hittite: kupaḫi 'headgear';
- κύμβαλον kýmbalon, 'cymbal', related to Hittite: ḫuḫupal 'wooden percussion instrument';
- μόλυβδος mólybdos, 'lead', Mycenaean Greek: mo-ri-wo-do, from *morkʷ-io- 'dark', as in Lydian: mariwda(ś)-k 'the dark ones';
- ὄβρυζα óbryza, 'vessel for refining gold', related to Hittite: ḫuprušḫi 'vessel';
- τολύπη tolýpē, 'ball of wool', related to Hittite: taluppa 'lump'/'clod' (or Cuneiform Luwian: taluppa/i).

== Other substratum theories ==
There are other substrate proposals. Some fringe theories ranging from the mild (e.g., Egyptian) to the extreme (e.g., Proto-Turkic) have been proposed but have not been adopted by the broader academic community.

=== Minoan substratum ===
The English archaeologist Arthur Evans proposed a Minoan (Eteocretan) substratum, based on an assumption of widespread Minoan colonisation of the Aegean, policed by a Minoan thalassocracy.

Raymond A. Brown, after listing a number of words of pre-Greek origin from Crete, suggests a relation between Minoan, Eteocretan, Lemnian (Pelasgian), and Tyrsenian, inventing the name "Aegeo-Asianic" for the proposed language family.

However, many Minoan loanwords found in Mycenaean Greek (e.g., words for architecture, metals and metallurgy, music, use of domestic species, social institutions, weapons, weaving) may be the result of socio-cultural and economic interactions between the Minoans and Mycenaeans during the Bronze Age, and may therefore be part of a linguistic adstrate in Greek rather than a substrate.

=== Tyrrhenian substratum ===
A Tyrsenian/Etruscan substratum was proposed on the basis of the Lemnos funerary stele: four pottery sherds inscribed in Etruscan that were found in 1885 at Ephestia in Lemnos.

However, the Lemnos funerary stele was written in a form of ancient Etruscan, which suggested that the author had emigrated from Etruria in Italy, rather than the Greek sphere, and the Homeric tradition makes no mention of a Tyrrhenian presence on Lemnos.

If Etruscan was spoken in Greece, it must have been effectively a language isolate, with no significant relationship to or interaction with speakers of pre-Greek or ancient Greek, since, in the words of Carlo De Simone, there are no Etruscan words that can be "etymologically traced back to a single, common ancestral form with a Greek equivalent".

=== Kartvelian theory ===
In 1979, Edzard J. Furnée proposed a theory by which a pre-Greek substrate is associated with the Kartvelian languages.

== See also ==
- Camunic language (probably Raetic)
- Elymian language (probably Indo-European)
- Eteocypriot
- Hattic language
- Hurro-Urartian languages
  - Hurrian language
  - Urartian language
  - (?) Kassite language
- North Picene language
- Paleo-Sardinian language (also called Paleosardinian, Protosardic, Nuraghic language)
- Sicanian language
- Sicel language
- Tamil loanwords in Ancient Greek

=== Substrates of other Indo-European languages ===
- Germanic substrate hypothesis
- Goidelic substrate hypothesis
- Old European hydronymy
- Substratum in Vedic Sanskrit

== Sources ==
- Bammesberger, Alfred; Vennemann, Theo, eds. (2003). Languages in Prehistoric Europe (in German). Heidelberg: Universitatsverlag Winter GmBH. ISBN 978-3-8253-1449-1.
- Beekes, Robert S. P. (2003). "The Origin of Apollo". Journal of Ancient Near Eastern Religions. 3 (1): 1–21. doi:10.1163/1569212031960384.
- Beekes, Robert S. P. (2009). Etymological Dictionary of Greek. Leiden and Boston: Brill. ISBN 978-90-04-17418-4.
- Beekes, Robert S. P. (2014). Pre-Greek Phonology, Morphology, Lexicon. Leiden: Brill. ISBN 9789004279445.
- Brown, Raymond A. (1985). Evidence for Pre-Greek Speech on Crete from Greek Alphabetic Sources. Amsterdam: Adolf M. Hakkert. ISBN 9789025608767.
- Coleman, John E. (2000). "An Archaeological Scenario for the "Coming of the Greeks" ca. 3200 B.C." The Journal of Indo-European Studies. 28 (1–2): 101–153.
- Demiraj, Shaban (2006). The Origin of the Albanians: Linguistically Investigated. Tirana: Academy of Sciences of Albania. ISBN 978-99943-817-1-5.
- De Simone, C. (2007). "9 Greek and Etruscan". In Christidis, A.-F.; Arapopoulou, Maria; Chritē, Maria (eds.). A History of Ancient Greek: From the Beginnings to Late Antiquity. Cambridge: Cambridge University Press. pp. 786–791. ISBN 978-0-521-83307-3.
- Duhoux, Y. (2007a). "8 Greek and pre-Greek Languages: Introduction". In Christidis, A.-F.; Arapopoulou, Maria; Chritē, Maria (eds.). A History of Ancient Greek: From the Beginnings to Late Antiquity. Cambridge: Cambridge University Press. pp. 220–222. ISBN 9780521833073.
- Finkelberg, Margalit (2006). Greeks and Pre-Greeks: Aegean Prehistory and Greek Heroic Tradition. Cambridge: Cambridge University Press. ISBN 978-0-521-85216-6.
- Furnée, Edzard J. (1972). Die Wichtigsten Konsonantischen Erscheinungen Des Vorgriechischen: Mit Einem Appendix Über Den Vokalismus (in German). The Hague: Mouton.
- Furnée, Edzard Johan (1979). Vorgriechisch-Kartvelisches (in German). Leuven: Editions Peeters. ISBN 2801701149.
- García-Ramón, José Luís (2004). "Greece, Languages". In Cancik, Hubert; Schneider, Helmut (eds.). Brill's New Pauly, Vol. 5. Leiden: Brill.
- Gere, Cathy (2006). The Tomb of Agamemnon. Cambridge, MA: Cambridge University Press. ISBN 978-0-674-02170-9.
- Hajnal, Ivo; Posch, Claudia (2009). "Graeco-Anatolian Contacts in the Mycenaean Period". Sprachwissenschaft Innsbruck Institut für Sprachen und Literaturen.
- Hooker, John (1976). Mycenaean Greece. Routledge. ISBN 978-0-7100-8379-1.
- Meier-Brügger, Michael (2017). "The Lexicon of Greek". In Klein, Jared; Joseph, Brian; Fritz, Matthias (eds.). Handbook of Comparative and Historical Indo-European Linguistics. Vol. 1. Walter de Gruyter. ISBN 978-3-11-054243-1.
- Mihaylova, Biliana (2012). "The Pre-Greek Substratum Revisited". In Hejl, Christina Løye; Jacquet, Janus Bahs; Heide, Marie; Whitehead, Benedicte Nielsen; Olsen, Birgit Anette (eds.). Etymology and the European Lexicon (PDF). Copenhagen: Roots of Europe (University of Copenhagen). pp. 80–81.
- Orel, Vladimir E. (1998). Albanian Etymological Dictionary. Leiden and Boston: Brill. ISBN 978-90-04-11024-3.
- Renfrew, Colin (1973). "Problems in the General Correlation of Archaeological and Linguistic Strata in Prehistoric Greece: The Model of Autochthonous Origin". In Crossland, R. A.; Birchall, Ann (eds.). Bronze Age Migrations in the Aegean; Archaeological and Linguistic Problems in Greek Prehistory: Proceedings of the first International Colloquium on Aegean Prehistory, Sheffield. London: Gerald Duckworth and Company Limited. pp. 263–276. ISBN 978-0-7156-0580-6.
- Renfrew, Colin (1998). "Word of Minos: The Minoan Contribution to Mycenaean Greek and the Linguistic Geography of the Bronze Age Aegean". Cambridge Archaeological Journal. 8 (2): 239–264. doi:10.1017/S0959774300001852. S2CID 162191366.
- West, Martin L. (2007). Indo-European Poetry and Myth. Oxford: Oxford University Press. ISBN 978-0-19-928075-9.
