= Indo-European (disambiguation) =

Indo-European is a major language family of Europe, parts of West and Central Asia, and South Asia.

Indo-European may also refer to:

- Proto-Indo-European language, the reconstructed common ancestor of all Indo-European languages
- Proto-Indo-Europeans (or “Indo-Europeans”), a hypothetical prehistoric ethnolinguistic group of Eurasia who spoke Proto-Indo-European
- Indo people (Dutch: Indo-Europeaan), people of Dutch East Indies and European descent

== See also ==
- Indo-European migrations
- Indo-European studies, an academic field involving linguistics, anthropology, history, archaeology
- Indo-European vocabulary, a table of the most fundamental Proto-Indo-European language words and roots
- Pre-Indo-European (disambiguation)
- Proto-Indo-European religion, the hypothetical religion of the Proto-Indo-Europeans
- Proto-Indo-European society, the hypothetical society of the Proto-Indo-Europeans
