= Paleo-Corsican language =

Extinct language of Corsica

Paleo-Corsican
- Region: Corsica
- Ethnicity: Ancient Corsi
- Extinct: (date missing)
- Language family: Ligurian?

Language codes
- ISO 639-3: None (mis)
- Glottolog: None

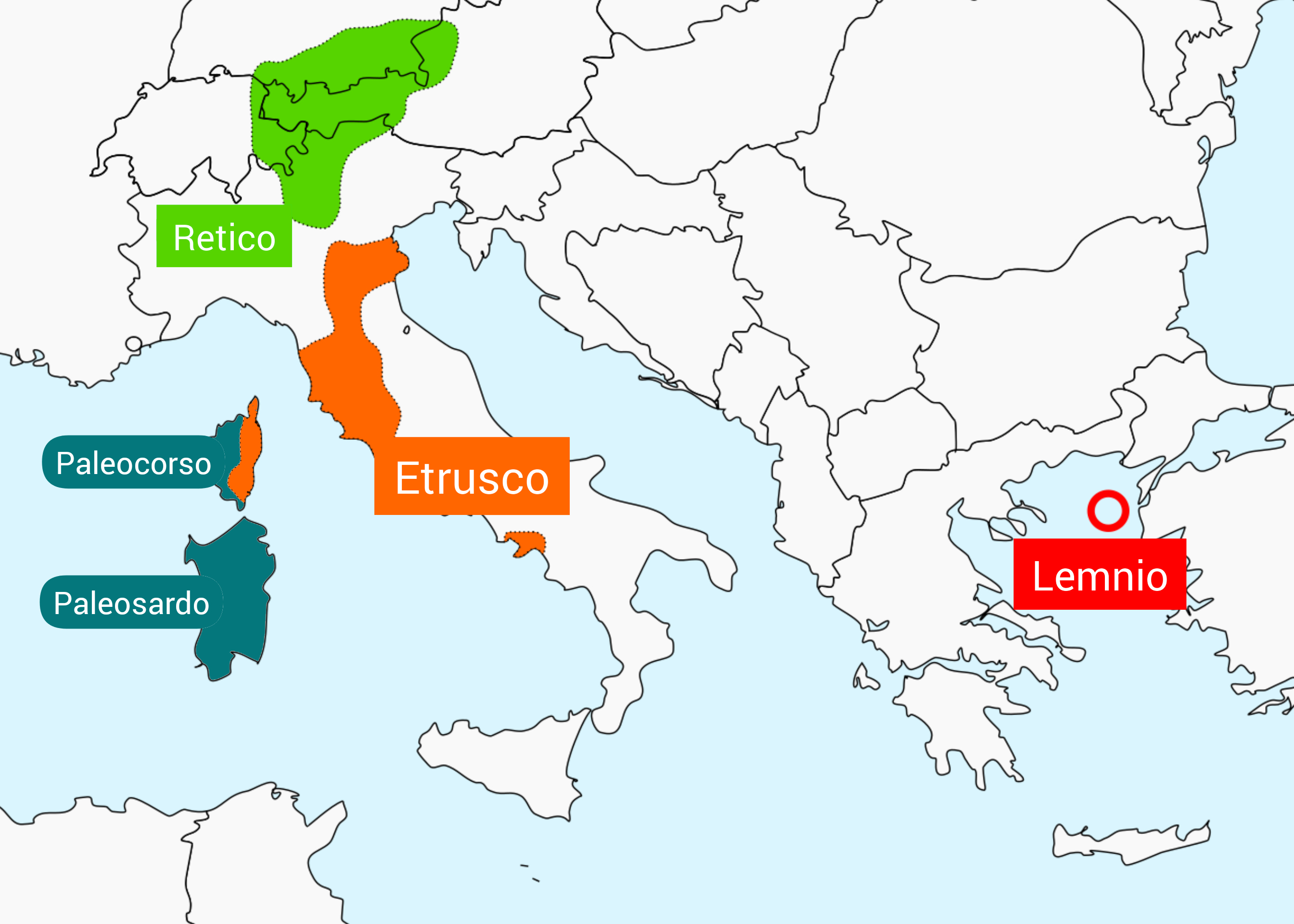
Area of Tyrsenian languages (Rhaetian, Etruscan, Lemnian), Paleo-Corsican and Paleo-Sardinian languages

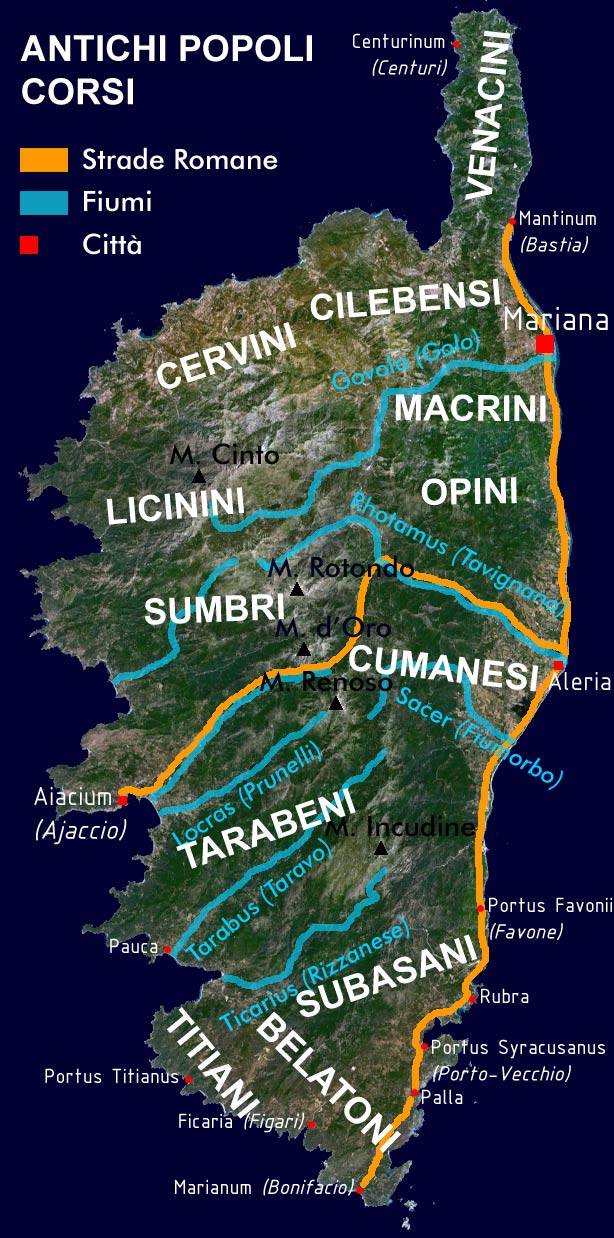
Ancient tribes of Corsica, speakers of Paleo-Corsican language or languages

Nuragic populations, ancient tribes of Sardinia; speakers of Paleo-Corsican language or languages are shown in blue.

The Paleo-Corsican language is an extinct language (or perhaps set of languages) spoken in Corsica and presumably in the northeastern part of Sardinia (corresponding to today's historical region of Gallura) by the ancient Corsi populations during the Bronze and Iron Ages. The scanty evidence of the language, which comes mainly from toponymy, would indicate a type of Pre-Indo-European language or, according to others, Indo-European, with Ligurian and Iberian affinity.

Antoine Peretti, claiming the presence of different linguistic areas, ranks as Ligurian some suffixes appearing in Corsican place names, like -asco, -elo/-ello, -ate/-ati and -inco.

== See also ==
- Paleo-Sardinian language
- List of ancient Corsican and Sardinian tribes

== Bibliography ==
- Ugas, Giovanni (2005). L'alba dei nuraghi. Cagliari: Fabula Editore. ISBN 978-88-89661-00-0.
- Zucca, Raimondo (1996). La Corsica romana. Oristano: S'Alvure. ISBN 9788873831266.
