= Vasconic substrate hypothesis =

Proposal regarding Western European languages

The Vasconic substrate hypothesis is a proposal that several Western European languages contain remnants of an old language family of Vasconic languages, of which Basque is the only surviving member. The proposal was made by the German linguist Theo Vennemann, but has been rejected by other linguists.

According to Vennemann, Vasconic languages were once widespread on the European continent before they were mostly replaced by Indo-European languages. Relics of these languages include toponyms across Central and Western Europe.

== Basis of the hypothesis ==
Theo Vennemann based his hypothesis on the works of Hans Krahe, who postulated an Old European substrate as the origin of the European hydronymy (Old European hydronymy). He classified the substratum language as Indo-European.

Vennemann rejected the classification. He gives the following reasons:

- The area of the hydronymy substrate language covers the Iberic Peninsula, which he postulates to be non-Indo-European during the time the hydronymy developed according to Krahe.
- From a phoneme-statistical point of view, the dominance of a-vocalism and the sparseness of plosives is noteworthy.
- Some hydronyms survived for a long time. This led Vennemann to the "toponomastic main axiom": Once places are given a name, they keep it, and languages that newly arrive at such a place take over the already existing toponymy. He concludes that most place names in Europe must therefore be pre-Indo-European.

== The hypothesis and its evidence ==
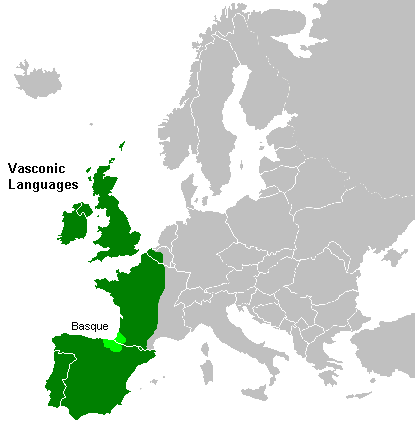
Proposed area of Vasconic substratum

Vennemann developed his ideas in a series of papers which were collected in a book called Europa Vasconica–Europa Semitica.

He accepts Krahe's theory that there was a uniform Old European language, which is the origin of the Old European hydronymy, but proposes that it is of Vasconic origin. Vasconic is a language family proposed by Vennemann encompassing Basque (its only extant member), Aquitanian, Ligurian, and possibly Iberian and Proto-Sardinian.

Vennemann proposes that this uniform Vasconic substrate must come from a linguistically uniform population, which can only exist within a small area. He therefore proposes that during the last Ice Age, the Vasconic people lived in the modern region of Aquitania. As the glaciers retreated, the Vasconics began moving to the north and south, settling most of Western and Central Europe, spreading their language. They gave names to the rivers and places. This toponymy mostly persisted after the Vasconic language was replaced by Indo-European languages in most of their area, of which the present Basque area in northern Spain and southern France is postulated to be a relic.

=== Evidence cited by Vennemann ===
In support of this argument, Vennemann cites, inter alia:

- cultural similarities noted by Marija Gimbutas;
- parallels in geographical toponyms that may be relics of a pre-Indo-European substratum, including
  - numerous examples from Old European hydronymy and maritime terminology, noted by scholars such as Hans Krahe, that do not necessarily have an Indo-European root, such as words in West Germanic languages for "sea" (Proto-Germanic *saiwiz; Dutch zee) and "ice" (Proto-Germanic *īsą; Dutch ijs) that are similar to their respective Basque counterparts; i.e., itsaso and izotz;
  - the similarity of names like Val d'Aran, Arundel, and Arendal to (for example) the Standard Basque word haran ('valley');
  - the similarity of names containing Eber- with Basque: ibar "valley," "river mouth".

==== Vigesimal numerical systems ====
Elements of vigesimal ("base-20") counting and number systems, which Vennemann regards as a trait of Vasconic languages, exist in Celtic, Danish and French.

=== Genetics ===
Evidence from genetics and blood types shows that the modern Basque people share physical characteristics with old populations throughout Western and Central Europe, especially in likely refugia areas, such as mountain ranges.

== Reception ==
=== General criticism ===
The hypothesis has been largely rejected by historical linguists. Vennemann's theories on "Vasconic" toponymy and hydronymy were opposed by linguists such as P. R. Kitson (1996), and Baldi & Richard (2006), who pointed out that most linguists see unusual European hydronyms as more likely to have Indo-European roots of some kind, and the Indo-European linguist Michael Meier-Brügger.

German linguist Dieter H. Steinbauer argued that it is difficult to argue on the basis of Basque because:

- its status as an isolate means that there is insufficient historical data for the reconstruction of the substratal language and;
- Basque itself has adopted many words from Indo-European languages.

Steinbauer also criticized Vennemann for

- assuming that a Vasconic substratal language would necessarily share with Basque a feature of root words with initial consonant clusters;
- ignoring indications that the ancient Etruscan language seems more closely related to western Anatolian languages, and for
- several methodological flaws, concluding that "a scientific discourse with Vennemann must face insurmountable obstacles".

The Bascologist Joseba Lakarra rejects Vennemann's Vasconic etymologies, as he considers them to be incompatible with the current state of research on historical phonology and morphology of Basque. Larry Trask concludes that Vennemann found an agglutinating language unrelated to Basque, which could e.g. be Indo-European.

Harald Bichlmeier points out that Vennemann compares the etymological roots of the toponymy with modern Basque words. This is incoherent, as the comparison should be done using the reconstructed forms of Proto-Basque.

Jürgen Udolph shows that some of the assumed Vasconic roots are in fact Indo-European like Vennemann's *muna, especially since Proto-Basque lacked word initial /m/. Stefan Georg adds, that some roots do not exist in Basque or Proto-Basque.

According to Lutz Reichardt the hypothesis is based on the assumption that "settlement continuity exists and that this means continuity of names throughout all languages being spoken in that settlement". Furthermore, he criticizes the methodology applied by those who support the Vasconian hypothesis:

[The words] are segmented arbitrarily and some segments are explained poorly, others are not explained at all. In addition, the elements -ingen, -hûsen, -dorf, -bach etc. are supposed to have been added to the toponymy at a later date although there is no proof for this assumption in historical documents.

Hayim Y. Sheynin, an expert on Semitic languages, reviewed the work of Vennemann and concluded that his reasoning is based on outdated data and scientific works rejected by critics. He states that much of the evidence presented for an Afro-Asiatic stratum is objectable and based on mere sound similarities only.

Peter Anreiter noted that toponymy with an unknown meaning can be "interpreted" in almost any language. To demonstrate his point, he then "interprets" the Vasconisms proposed by Vennemann as Turkish words. Nonetheless, he states that words with plausible Indo-European etymology should be considered as toponymy of Indo-European origin.

Piotr Gąsiorowski cautioned that it is unclear whether or not an Old European Hydronymy exists at all. According to him it is mere speculation to postulate an etymology for similarly appearing toponymy from a vast area without being able to show that they are indeed from the same substratum.

=== Origin of the vigesimal numerical systems in Europe ===
Vennemann argues that the vigesimal numerical systems in the modern Celtic languages, in French and Danish are a remnant of the Vasconic vigesimal counting system. According to Manfred Kudlek, Old Irish and Gallic did not have vigesimal counting systems and neither did Old Norse. The vigesimal systems in the respective languages developed during the Middle Ages, e.g. Danish started to use a vigesimal system in the 13th/14th century. Therefore, the French system cannot be the result of Celtic influence. Kudlek proposes that the Celtic and Danish systems are loans from French. Brigitte Bauer, too, rejects substratal influence. She suggests that intrasocietal developments, e.g. in the monetary system, may explain the adoption of vigesimal systems.

=== Genetics ===
Manfred Kayser and Lutz Roewer, both experts on genetics, commented in 2013 that genetics do not reveal anything about the languages spoken by the individuals. Furthermore, the information genetics can deliver on population historical hypothesis is limited.

Dieterlen and Bengtson find the distribution of blood factors and haploid groups is convincing evidence for Basque settlement in Western Europe before the Indo-Europeans settled there in line with Vennemann's hypothesis. They note that similarity between the distributions in Basque areas and Sardinia.

== See also ==
- Atlantic (Semitic) languages
- Atlantic Bronze Age
- Aquitanian language
- Bronze Age in Europe
- Indo-European substrate hypotheses
- Neolithic Europe § Language in the Neolithic
- Old European hydronymy
- Origin of the Basques § Old European
- Pre-Roman peoples of the Iberian Peninsula
- Proto-Basque
- Urbian
- Dené–Caucasian languages
