= Goidelic substrate hypothesis =

Hypothesized pre-Celtic language substrate

The Goidelic substrate hypothesis refers to the hypothesized language or languages spoken in Ireland before the arrival of the Goidelic languages. They may include an earlier wave of Celtic languages or a hypothesized pre-Celtic language or languages.

Scholars have suggested:

- that an older language or languages could have been replaced by the Insular Celtic languages; and
- that words and grammatical constructs from the original language, or languages, may nevertheless persist as a substrate in the Celtic languages, especially in placenames and personal names.

== Hypothesis of non-Indo-European languages ==
Ireland was settled, like the rest of northern Europe, after the retreat of the ice sheets around 10,500 BC. Indo-European languages had a much later arrival. Some scholars hypothesize that the Goidelic languages may have been brought by the Bell Beaker culture around 2500 BC. This dating is supported by DNA analysis indicating large-scale Indo-European migration to Britain about that time.

== Pre-Goidelic Celtic languages ==
Other scholars argue for a much later date of arrival of Goidelic languages to Ireland based on linguistic evidence. Peter Schrijver has suggested that Irish was perhaps preceded by an earlier wave of Celtic-speaking colonists (based on population names attested in Ptolemy's Geography) who were displaced by a later wave of proto-Irish speakers only in the 1st century AD, following a migration in the wake of the Roman conquest of Britain, with Irish and British Celtic languages only branching off from a common Insular Celtic language around that time.

== Suggested non-Indo-European words in Irish ==
Gearóid Mac Eoin proposes the following words, some of which are found only in Early Irish literature, as deriving from the substrate:

- bréife 'ring, loop'
- cuifre/cuipre 'kindness'
- fafall/fubhal, one of the hazel trees at the well of Segais
- lufe 'feminine'
- slife 'broadening'
- strophais 'straw'

He also puts forward the following place names, also from old Irish literature:

- Bréifne
- Crufait
- Dún Gaifi
- Faffand
- Grafand, an old name for Knockgraffon
- Grafrenn
- Life/Mag Liphi
- Máfat

Gerry Smyth, in Space and the Irish Cultural Imagination, suggested that Dothar, the Old Irish name for the River Dodder, could be a substrate word.

Peter Schrijver submits the following words as deriving from the substrate:

- partán 'crab'
- Partraige (ethnonym) (note that partaing "crimson (Parthian) red" is a loanword from Lat. parthicus)
- pattu 'hare'
- petta 'pet, lap-dog'
- pell 'horse'
- pít 'portion of food'
- pluc '(round) mass'
- prapp 'rapid'
- gliomach 'lobster'
- faochán 'periwinkle'
- ciotóg 'left hand'
- bradán 'salmon'
- scadán 'herring'

Schrijver noted the numerousness of words relating to fishing. He suggested that the presence of unlenited stops among these fishing words may indicate that these words entered Irish as late as 500 AD. In a further study he gives counter-arguments against some criticisms by Graham Isaac.

Ranko Matasović lists the following words:

- lacha 'duck' (possibly an onomatopoeic word for a duck's quack)
- sinnach 'fox'
- luis 'rowan'
- lon 'blackbird'
- dega 'beetle'
- ness 'stoat'

He also points out that there are words of possibly or probably non-Indo-European origin in other Celtic languages as well; therefore, the substrate may not have been in contact with Primitive Irish but rather with Proto-Celtic. Examples of words found in more than one branch of Celtic but with no obvious cognates outside Celtic include:

- Middle Irish ainder 'young woman', Middle Welsh anneir 'heifer', perhaps Gaulish anderon (possibly connected with Basque andere 'lady, woman')
- Old Irish berr 'short', Middle Welsh byrr 'short', Gaulish Birrus (name); possibly related to the birrus, a short cloak or hood
- Old Irish bran 'raven', Middle Welsh bran 'raven', Gaulish Brano-, sometimes translated as 'crow' (name element, such as Bran Ardchenn, Bran Becc mac Murchado, and Bran the Blessed)
- Middle Irish brocc 'badger', Middle Welsh broch 'badger', Gaulish Broco- (name element) (borrowed into English as brock)
- Old Irish carpat '(war) chariot', Welsh cerbyd, Gaulish carpento-, Carbanto-
- Old Irish eó 'salmon', Middle Welsh ehawc 'salmon', Gaulish *esoks (borrowed into Latin as esox); has been compared with Basque izokin
- Old Irish cuit 'piece', Middle Welsh peth 'thing', Gaulish *pettia (borrowed into Latin as petia and French as pièce)
- Old Irish molt 'wether', Middle Welsh mollt 'ram, wether', Gaulish Moltus (name) and *multon- (borrowed into French as mouton, from which to English as mutton)

The Old Irish word for "horn", adarc, is also listed as a potential Basque loanword; in Basque the word is adar.

== See also ==
- Atlantic Bronze Age
- Pre-Greek substrate
- Pre-Indo-European languages
- Prehistoric Ireland
- Mythological Cycle
- Germanic substrate hypothesis
- Atlantic languages (Afroasiatic)
- Irish syntax
