= Substratum in Vedic Sanskrit =

Vedic Sanskrit has a number of linguistic features which are alien to most other Indo-European languages. Prominent examples include: phonologically, the introduction of retroflexes, which alternate with dentals, and morphologically, the formation of gerunds. Some philologists attribute such features, as well as the presence of non-Indo-European vocabulary, to a local substratum of languages encountered by Indo-Aryan peoples in Central Asia (Bactria-Marghiana) and within the Indian subcontinent during Indo-Aryan migrations, including the Dravidian languages.

Scholars have claimed to identify a substantial body of loanwords in the earliest Indian texts, including evidence of Non-Indo-Aryan elements (such as -s- following -u- in Rigvedic busa). While some postulated loanwords are from Dravidian, and other forms are traceable to Munda or Proto-Burushaski, the bulk have no proven basis in any of the known families, suggesting a source in one or more lost languages. The discovery that some words taken to be loans from one of these lost sources had also been preserved in the earliest Old Avestan texts, and also in Tocharian, convinced Michael Witzel and Alexander Lubotsky that the source lay in Central Asia and could be associated with the Bactria–Margiana Archaeological Complex (BMAC). Another lost language is that of the Indus Valley civilization, which Witzel initially labelled Para-Munda, but later the Kubhā-Vipāś substrate.

== Phonology ==
Retroflex phonemes are now found throughout the Burushaski, Nuristani, Dravidian and Munda families. They are reconstructed for Proto-Burushaski, Proto-Dravidian and (to a minimal extent) for Proto-Munda, and are thus clearly an areal feature of the Indian subcontinent. They are not reconstructible for either Proto-Indo-European or Proto-Indo-Iranian, and they are also not found in Mitanni–Indo-Aryan loanwords.

The acquisition of the phonological trait by early Indo-Aryan is thus unsurprising, but it does not immediately permit identification of the donor language. Since the adoption of a retroflex series does not affect poetic meter, it is impossible to say if it predates the early portions of the Rigveda or was a part of Indo-Aryan when the Rigvedic verses were being composed; however, it is certain that at the time of the redaction of the Rigveda (ca. 500 BCE), the retroflex series had become part of Sanskrit phonology. There is a clear predominance of retroflexion in the Northwest (Nuristani, Dardic, Khotanese Saka, Burushaski), involving affricates, sibilants and even vowels (in Kalasha), compared to other parts of the subcontinent. It has been suggested that this points to the regional, northwestern origin of the phenomenon in Rigvedic Sanskrit. Bertil Tikkanen is open to the idea that various syntactical developments in Indo-Aryan could have been the result of adstratum rather than the result of substrate influences. However Tikkanen states that "in view of the strictly areal implications of retroflexion and the occurrence of retroflexes in many early loanwords, it is hardly likely that Indo-Aryan retroflexion arose in a region that did not have a substratum with retroflexes."

Not only the typological development of Old to Middle Indo-Aryan, but already the phonological development from Pre-Vedic to Vedic (including even the oldest attested form in the Rig-Veda) has been seen as suggestive of Dravidian influence. However, Hock argues that Dravidian should not be considered as significant, but that retroflexion is, rather, the outcome of areal features cutting across language boundaries in the Northwest of the Indian subcontinent, and extending into Central Asia.

== Vocabulary ==
In 1955 Burrow listed some 500 words in Sanskrit that he considered to be loans from non-Indo-European languages. He noted that in the earliest form of the language such words are comparatively few, but they progressively become more numerous. Though mentioning the likelihood that one source was lost Indian languages extinguished by the advance of Indo-Aryan, he concentrated on finding loans from Dravidian. Kuiper identified 383 specifically Rigvedic words as non-Indo-Aryan – roughly 4% of its vocabulary. Oberlies prefers to consider 344–358 "secure" non-Indo-European words in the Rigveda. Even if all local non-Indo-Aryan names of persons and places are subtracted from Kuiper's list, that still leaves some 211–250 "foreign" words, around 2% of the total vocabulary of the Rigveda.

These loanwords cover local flora and fauna, agriculture and artisanship, terms of toilette, clothing and household. Dancing and music are particularly prominent, and there are some items of religion and beliefs. They only reflect village life, and not the intricate civilization of the Indus cities, befitting a post-Harappan time frame. In particular, Indo-Aryan words for plants stem in large part from other language families, especially from the now-lost substrate languages.

Mayrhofer identified a "prefixing" language as the source of many non-Indo-European words in the Rigveda, based on recurring prefixes like ka- or ki-, that have been compared by Michael Witzel to the Munda prefix k- for designation of persons, and the plural prefix ki seen in Khasi, though he notes that in Vedic, k- also applies to items merely connected with humans and animals. Examples include:

- काकम्बीर kākambīra a certain tree
- ककर्दु kakardu "wooden stick"
- कपर्दिन् kapardin "with a hair-knot"
- कर्पास karpāsa "cotton"
- कवन्ध kavandha "barrel"
- कवष kavaṣa "straddle-legged"
- किलास kilāsa "spotted, leprous"
- किमीद kimīda "a demon", cf. शिमिदा śimidā "a demoness"
- कीनाश kīnāśa "ploughman"
- कियम्बु kiyāmbu a water plant
- कुलाय kulāya "nest"
- कुलिश kuliśa "axe"
- कुमार kumāra "boy"
- कुलुङ्ग kuluṅga "antelope"
- कुरुङ्ग Kuruṅga name of a chieftain of the Turvaśa.

Witzel remarks that these words span all of local village life. He considers that they were drawn from the lost language of the northern Indus Civilization and its Neolithic predecessors. As they abound in Austroasiatic-like prefixes, he initially chose to call it Para-Munda, but later the Kubhā-Vipāś substrate.

The Indo-Europeanist and Indologist Paul Thieme has questioned Dravidian etymologies proposed for Vedic words, for most of which he gives Indo-Aryan or Sanskrit etymologies, and has condemned what he characterizes as a misplaced "zeal for hunting up Dravidian loans in Sanskrit". Rahul Peter Das, while not discounting the possibility of foreign elements in Vedic, contended that there nevertheless is "not a single case" in which a Communis opinio has been found confirming the foreign origin of a Rigvedic word". Kuiper answered that charge, on which Das then commented. Burrow in turn has criticized the "resort to tortuous reconstructions in order to find, by hook or by crook, Indo-European explanations for Sanskrit words". Kuiper reasons that given the abundance of Indo-European comparative material – and the scarcity of Dravidian or Munda – the inability to clearly confirm whether the etymology of a Vedic word is Indo-European implies that it is not.

== Lost donor languages ==
Colin Masica could not find etymologies from Indo-European or Dravidian or Munda or as loans from Persian for 31 percent of agricultural and flora terms of Hindi. He proposed an origin in an unknown language "X". Southworth also notes that the flora terms did not come from either Dravidian or Munda. Southworth found only five terms which are shared with Munda, leading to his suggestion that "the presence of other ethnic groups, speaking other languages, must be assumed for the period in question".

=== Language of the Bactria–Margiana Archaeological Complex (the BMAC substrate) ===
Terms borrowed from an otherwise unknown substrate language, sometimes called the BMAC substrate, include those relating to cereal-growing and breadmaking (“bread”; “ploughshare”; “seed”; “sheaf”; “yeast”), waterworks (“canal”; “well”), architecture (“brick”; “house”; “pillar”; “wooden peg”), tools or weapons (“axe”; “club”), textiles and garments (“cloak”; “cloth”; “coarse garment”; “hem”; “needle”) and plants (“hemp”; “mustard”; “soma plant”). Lubotsky pointed out that the phonological and morphological similarity of 55 loanwords in Iranian and in Sanskrit indicate that both share a common substratum, or perhaps two dialects of the same substratum. He concludes that the BMAC language of the population of the towns of Central Asia (where Indo-Iranians must have arrived in the 2nd millennium BCE) and the language spoken in Punjab (see Harappan below) were intimately related. However, the prevailing interpretation is that Harappan is not related, and the 55 loanwords entered Proto-Indo-Iranian during its development in the Sintashta culture in distant contact with the Bactria–Margiana Archaeological Complex, and then many more words with the same origin enriched Old Indic as it developed among pastoralists who integrated with and perhaps ruled over the declining BMAC.

Examples:

- BMAC *anću 'soma plant (ephedra)’ → Skt. aṃśú-; Av. ąsu-
- BMAC *atʰr̥ → Skt. átharvan 'priest', Av. āθrauuan-/aθaurun- 'id.', Pehlevi āsrōn; Toch. A atär, B etre 'hero'
- BMAC *bʰiš- 'to heal' → Skt. bhiṣáj- m. 'physician'; LAv. bišaziia- 'to cure'
- BMAC *dr̥ća → Skt. dūrśa- 'coarse garment'; Wakhi δirs 'goat or yak wool', Shughni δox̆c 'body hair; coarse cloth'
- BMAC *gandʰ/t- → Skt. gandhá-; LAv. gaiṇti- 'odor'
- BMAC *gandʰ(a)rw- 'mythical beast' → Skt. gandharvá-; LAv. gaṇdərəβa-
- BMAC *indra theonym → Skt. Índra; LAv. Iṇdra daeva's name
- BMAC *išt(i) 'brick' → Skt. íṣṭakā- f. (VS+); LAv. ištiia- n., OP išti- f., Pers. xešt, N. Kr. xist f.; Toch. B iścem 'clay'
- BMAC *ǰaǰʰa/uka 'hedgehog' → Skt. jáhakā; LAv. dužuka-, Bal. ǰaǰuk, Pers. žūža, N. Kr. jûjî/jîjû
- BMAC *jawījā 'canal, irrigation channel' → Skt. yavīyā-; OP yauwiyā-, Pers. ju(y)
- BMAC *k/ćan- 'hemp' → Skt. śaṇa; MP šan, Khot. kaṃha, Oss. gæn(æ)
- BMAC *majūkʰa 'wooden peg' → Skt. mayūkha-; OP mayūxa- 'doorknob', Pers. mix 'peg, nail'
- BMAC *nagna → Skt. nagnáhu- (AVP+) m. 'yeast'; Sogd. nɣny, Pashto naɣan, Pers. nān 'bread', N. Kr. nan m. 'bread', Za. nun m. 'bread'
- BMAC *sćāga ~ sćaga 'billy-goat' → Skt. chāga-; Oss. sæǧ(æ), Wakhi čəɣ 'kid'
- BMAC *sikatā 'sand, gravel' → Skt. sikatā-; OP θikā 'sand', Khot. siyatā, Buddh. Sogd. šykth, Pashto šega/šiga
- BMAC *sinšap- 'mustard' → Skt. sarṣapa; Khot. śśaśvāna, Parth. šyfš-d'n, Sodg. šywšp-δn, Pers. sipan-dān 'mustard seed'
- BMAC *(s)pʰāra 'ploughshare' → Skt. phāla-; Pers. supār
- BMAC *sūčī 'needle' → Skt. sūćī; LAv. sūkā-, MP sozan, Oss. sūʒīn ~ soʒīnæ
- BMAC *šwaipa 'tail' → Skt. śépa-, Prākrit cheppā-; LAv. xšuuaēpā-
- BMAC *(H)uštra 'camel' → Skt. úṣṭra-; Av. uštra-, Pers. šotor, N. Kr. hêştir, Pashto wuš/wux

Francfort and Tremblay on the basis of the Akkadian textual and archaeological evidence from Assyria and Babylonia, proposed to identify the BMAC with the kingdom of Marhashi. The Marhashite personal names seem to point towards an Eastern variant of Hurrian, or another language of the Hurro-Urartian language family rather than to Semitic or Indo-European, the latter of which had not yet appeared in the region.

=== Harappan ===
Witzel initially used the term "Para-Munda" to denote a hypothetical language related but not ancestral to modern Munda languages, which he identified as "Harappan", the language of the Indus Valley civilization. To avoid confusion with Munda, he later opted for the term "Kubhā-Vipāś substrate". He argues that the Rigveda shows signs of this hypothetical Harappan influence in the earliest level and Dravidian only in later levels, suggesting that speakers of Harappan were the original inhabitants of Punjab and that the Indo-Aryans encountered speakers of Dravidian not before middle Rigvedic times. Krishnamurti deems the evidence too meagre for this proposal. Regarding Witzel's methodology in claiming Para-Munda origins, Krishnamurti states: "The main flaw in Witzel's argument is his inability to show a large number of complete, unanalyzed words from Munda borrowed into the first phase of the Ṛgveda... It would have been better if [Witzel] said we did not know the true source of 300 or so early borrowings into the Ṛgveda." This statement, however, confuses Proto-Munda and Para-Munda and neglects the several hundred "complete, unanalyzed words" from a prefixing language, adduced by Kuiper and Witzel.

== Living donor languages ==
A concern raised in the identification of the substrate is that there is a large time gap between the comparative materials, which can be seen as a serious methodological drawback. One issue is the early geographical distribution of the South Asian languages. It should not be assumed that the present-day northern location of Brahui, Kurukh, and Malto reflects the position of their ancestor languages at the time of Indo-Aryan development. Another problem is that modern literary languages may present a misleading picture of their prehistoric ancestors. The first completely intelligible, datable, and sufficiently long and complete epigraphs that might be of some use in linguistic comparison are the early Tamil Brahmi inscriptions starting in the 2nd century BCE, and the Tamil inscriptions of the Pallava dynasty of about 550 CE. Similarly there is much less material available for comparative Munda and the interval in their case is at least three millennia. However, reconstructions of Proto-Dravidian and Proto-Munda now help in distinguishing the traits of these languages from those of Indo-European in the evaluation of substrate and loan words.

=== Dravidian ===
There are an estimated thirty to forty Dravidian loanwords in Vedic. Those for which Dravidian etymologies are proposed by Zvelebil include कुलाय kulāya "nest", कुल्फ kulpha "ankle", दण्ड daṇḍa "stick", कूल kūla "slope", बिल bila "hollow", खल khala "threshing floor". However, Witzel finds Dravidian loans only from the middle Rigvedic period, suggesting that linguistic contact between Indo-Aryan and Dravidian speakers only occurred as the Indo-Aryans expanded well into and beyond the Punjab.

While Dravidian languages are primarily confined to the South of India today, there is a striking exception: Brahui (which is spoken in parts of Baluchistan). It has been taken by some as the linguistic equivalent of a relict population, perhaps indicating that Dravidian languages were formerly much more widespread and were supplanted by the incoming Indo-Aryan languages. Certainly some Dravidian place-names are found in now Indo-Aryan regions of central India, and possibly even as far northwest as Sindh. However, it is now argued by Elfenbein that the Brahui could only have migrated to Balochistan from central India after 1000 CE, because of the lack of any older Iranian (Avestan) loanwords in Brahui. The main Iranian contributor to Brahui vocabulary, Balochi, is a western Iranian language like Kurdish, and moved to the area from the west only around 1000 CE.

As noted above, retroflex phonemes in early Indo-Aryan cannot identify the donor language as specifically Dravidian. Krishnamurti argues the Dravidian case for other features: "Besides, the Ṛg Veda has used the gerund, not found in Avestan, with the same grammatical function as in Dravidian, as a nonfinite verb for 'incomplete' action. Ṛg Vedic language also attests the use of iti as a quotative clause complementizer." However, such features are also found in the indigenous Burushaski language of the Pamirs and cannot be attributed only to Dravidian influence on the early Rigveda. A quotativeuiti is also seen in Avestan.

=== Munda ===
Kuiper identified one of the donor languages to Indo-Aryan as Proto-Munda. Munda linguist Gregory D. Anderson states: "It is surprising that nothing in the way of quotations from a Munda language turned up in (the hundreds and hundreds of) Sanskrit and middle-Indo-Aryan or "Indic" texts. (Note: In modern and colloquial context, the term "Indic" also refers more generally to the languages of the Indian subcontinent, thus also including non-Indo-Aryan languages. See e.g. Reynolds, Mike; Verma, Mahendra (2007). "Indic languages". In Britain, David (ed.). Language in the British Isles. Cambridge: Cambridge University Press. pp. 293–307. ISBN 978-0-521-79488-6.) There is also a surprising lack of borrowings of names of plants/animal/bird, and so forth into Sanskrit (Zide and Zide 1976). Much of what has been proposed for Munda words in older Indo-Aryan (e.g. Kuiper 1948) has been rejected by careful analysis. Some possible Munda names have been proposed, for example, Savara (Sora) or Khara, but ethnonymy is notoriously messy for the identification of language groups, and a single ethnonym may be adopted and used for linguistically rather different or entirely unrelated groups".

== See also ==
- Harappan language
- Pre-Greek substrate
- Vedda language
- Indo-Aryan loanwords in Tamil
- Indo-Aryan superstrate in Mitanni
