= Hans Krahe =

German philologist and linguist (1898–1965)

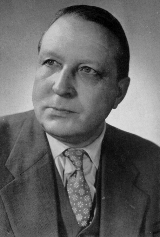
- Born: 7 February 1898; Gelsenkirchen, Westphalia, Kingdom of Prussia, German Empire
- Died: 25 June 1965 (aged 67); Tübingen, Baden-Württemberg, West Germany

Academic work
- Discipline: Philology and linguistics
- Sub-discipline: Illyrian languages
- Institutions: University of Würzburg
- Notable works: Die alten balkanillyrischen geographischen Namen, Lexikon altillyrischen Personennamen, Indogermanische Sprachwissenshaft

Hans Krahe (7 February 1898 – 25 June 1965) was a German philologist and linguist, specializing over many decades in the Illyrian languages. He was born in Gelsenkirchen.

== Work ==
Between 1936 and 1946 he was a professor at the University of Würzburg, where he founded the Archiv für die Gewässernamen Deutschlands in 1942. Between 1947 and 1949 he held a chair at Heidelberg and from 1949 to the time of his death he was Professor für vergleichende Sprachwissenschaft und Slavistik and Leiter des indologischen und slavischen Seminars in the University of Tübingen.

Krahe in his work of 1937 as a follower of Pan-Illyrian theory, discussed the Venetic language known from hundreds of inscriptions as an Illyrian language which, with the lower Italian Messapian and the Balkan Illyrian languages, forms the separate Illyrian branch of the Indo-European language family. Krahe thought that not only the name of the Illyrian and Adriatic Enetoi peoples are the same. Homer mentions a people in Asia Minor, the Paphlagonians, as from the Enetai province, and a few hundred years later Herodotus refers to the Enetoi twice, once as Illyrian and again as the occupants of the Adriatic sea. Krahe thought that the name of the Illyrian and Adriatic Enetos peoples are the same, and if Adriatic Enetoi were Adriatic Veneti (Venets) and Venets were the Vistula Veneti (Veneds) mentioned in other sources then Illyrians and Veneds were the same people. The basis of this theory is the similarity of the proper nouns and place names, but most of all in the water names of the Baltic and the Adriatic (Odra, Drava, Drama, Drweca, Opawa, Notec, etc.). Having the model of Illyrian in mind he assumed that together these elements represented the remnant of one archaic language.

In his later work Krahe substituted Julius Pokorny's Pan-Illyrian theory concerning the oldest European river names with that of Old European hydronymy, a network of names of water courses dating back to the Bronze Age and to a time before Indo-European languages had developed in central, northern and western Europe. In his 1949 essay Ortsnamen als Geschichtsquelle ("Placenames as sources for history") Krahe presented the analysis of hydronymy (river names) as a source of information both historical and prehistorical, with an extended analysis of the river Main as an example (Krahe 1949:17ff.)

He examined the layers of European water names and did so using two theses. The first thesis was that the oldest layer will always be the one that cannot be explained with the language of the people who currently live on the banks or shores of the given water, and/or consist of a monosyllabic stem carrying a meaning (at times derived or conjugated monosyllabic words). He found that these monosyllabic water names give a system which he called Alteuropäisch (Old European). The network of old European water names comprises waters from Scandinavia to lower Italy, and from the British Isles to the Baltic. It denotes the period of development of the common Indo-European language which was finished by the second millennium BC. Hans Krahe claimed that by that time the Western languages (Germanic, Celtic, Illyrian, the so-called Italic group - the Latin-Faliscus, the Oscan-Umbrian along with Venetic-Baltic - and to some extent Slavic), though they still constituted a uniform Old European language which was to further divide later, had already dissociated from the ancient Indo-European language. The similarities in European water names resulted from the radiation of this old European system, and not from the resemblance of the common words in the later separate languages.

His assumption that the linguistic strata corresponded to ethnic strata came under critical reappraisal decades after his death, in the work of Walter Pohl and others.

== Publications ==
In addition to his numerous articles, Krahe published:

- Die alten balkanillyrischen geographischen Namen (Heidelberg 1925). "The old Balkan-Illyrian geographical names", his first book.
- Lexikon altillyrischen Personennamen (1929). "Dictionary of Old Illyrian personal names.
- Indogermanische Sprachwissenshaft (Berlin 1948). "Indo-German linguistics".
- Ortsnamen als Geschichtsquelle (Heidelberg 1949). "Places names as sources of history".
- Die Sprache der Illyrier I. Die Quellen (1955). ISBN 3-447-00534-3 "Languages of the Illyrians I: Sources", a summary of his previous work. Volume II. Die messapischen Inschriften und ihre Chronologie ("Messapian inscriptions and their chronology") is by Carlo de Simone and Volume III. Die messapischen Personennamen ("Messapian personal names") by Jürgen Untermann. (Wiesbaden 1964). ISBN 3-447-00535-1
- Die Struktur der alteuropäischen Hydronymie (Wiesbaden 1963). "The structure of Old-European river names".
- Unsere ältesten Flussnamen (1964). "Our oldest river names".
- Germanische Sprachwissenschaft. Wortbildungslehre. (Berlin 1969). "Germanic linguistics".

== See also ==
- Old European hydronymy
