= Sicanian language =

Extinct and unclassified language of Sicily

Sicanian
- Sicana
- Region: Sicily
- Ethnicity: Sicani
- Extinct: c. 300 BCE
- Language family: unclassified
- Writing system: Greek script

Language codes
- ISO 639-3: sxc
- Glottolog: sica1234
- Approximate locations of the Sicani and their neighbors, the Elymians and the Sicels, in Sicily around 11th century BC (before the arrival of the Phoenicians and the Greeks).

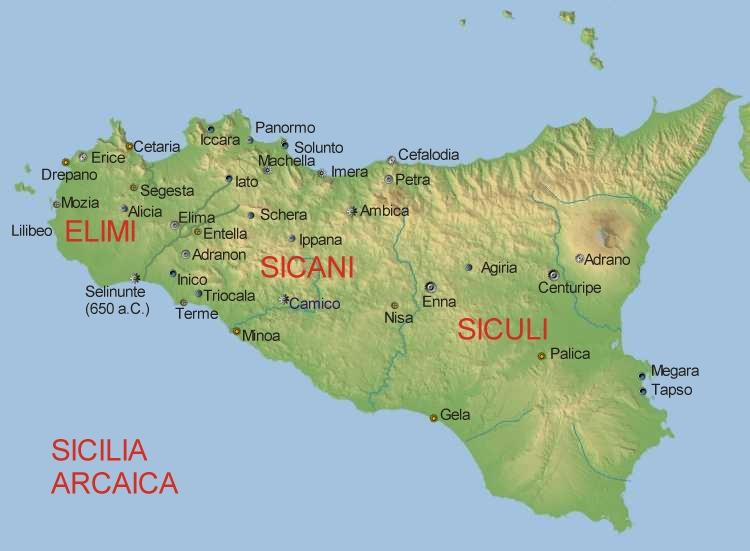
- Tribes of Hellenic Sicily

Sicanian is an extinct and unclassified language formerly spoken on the island of Sicily.

== History ==
Due to the lack of clear linguistic or cultural boundaries between Sicani and Sicel areas to the east, the existence of Sicanian as a distinct language is open to question; it is also unclear whether Sicanian survived as a language as late as the classical period, even in spoken form. On the other hand, the term Sicanian remains useful as a means of identifying the older, possibly non-Indo-European linguistic substrate, geographically overlaid by later arrivals such as Sicel and Elymian.

=== Documentation ===
A few short inscriptions using the Greek alphabet have been found in the Sicanian language. Except for names, they have not been translated, and the language is unclassified due to lack of data.

== Classification ==
The tentatively-identified "Sicanian" toponyms seem to display similarities with other non-Indo-European substratal languages within the Tyrsenian language family, although these proposed connections remain nebulous.

== Toponymy ==
Recurring suffixes such as -ina, -ana, -ara, -ssus and -ssa are often found in Sicanian place names (e.g. Camarina, Telmissus and Cimissa), and are thus proposed as a good starting point for identifying Sicanian towns.
