= Stratum (linguistics) =

Language influencing or influenced by another through contact

In linguistics, a stratum (Latin for 'layer') or strate is a historical layer of language that influences or is influenced by another language through contact. The notion of "strata" was first developed by the Italian linguist Graziadio Isaia Ascoli, and became known in the English-speaking world through the work of two different authors in 1932.

Both concepts apply to a situation where an intrusive language establishes itself in the territory of another, typically as the result of migration. Whether the superstratum case (the local language persists and the intrusive language disappears) or the substratum one (the local language disappears and the intrusive language persists) applies will normally only be evident after several generations, during which the intrusive language exists within a diaspora culture.

In order for the intrusive language to persist, the substratum case, the immigrant population will either need to take the position of a political elite or immigrate in significant numbers relative to the local population, i.e., the intrusion qualifies as an invasion or colonisation. An example would be the Roman Empire giving rise to Romance languages outside Italy, displacing Gaulish and many other Indo-European languages.

The superstratum case refers to elite invading populations that eventually adopt the language of the native lower classes. Examples of this would be the Burgundians and Franks in France, who eventually abandoned their Germanic dialects in favor of other Indo-European languages of the Romance branch, profoundly influencing the local speech in the process; and the Anglo-Normans in England.

== Substratum ==
A substratum (plural: substrata) or substrate is a language that an intrusive language influences, which may or may not ultimately change it to become a new language. The term is also used of substrate interference, i.e. the influence the substratum language exerts on the replacing language. According to some classifications, this is one of three main types of linguistic interference: substratum interference differs from both adstratum, which involves no language replacement but rather mutual borrowing between languages of equal "value", and superstratum, which refers to the influence a socially dominating language has on another, receding language that might eventually be relegated to the status of a substratum language.

In a typical case of substrate interference, a Language A occupies a given territory and another Language B arrives in the same territory, brought, for example, with migrations of population. Language B then begins to supplant language A: the speakers of Language A abandon their own language in favor of the other language, generally because they believe that it will help them achieve certain goals within government, the workplace, and in social settings. During the language shift, the receding language A still influences language B, for example, through the transfer of loanwords, place names, or grammatical patterns from A to B.

In most cases, the ability to identify substrate influence in a language requires knowledge of the structure of the substrate language. This can be acquired in numerous ways:

- The substrate language, or some later descendant of it, still survives in a part of its former range;
- Written records of the substrate language may exist to various degrees;
- The substrate language itself may be unknown entirely, but it may have surviving close relatives that can be used as a base of comparison.

One of the first-identified cases of substrate influence is an example of a substrate language of the second type: Gaulish, from the ancient Celtic people the Gauls. The Gauls lived in the modern French-speaking territory before the arrival of the Romans, namely the invasion of Julius Caesar's army. Given the cultural, economic and political advantages that came with being a Latin speaker, the Gauls eventually abandoned their language in favor of the language brought to them by the Romans, which evolved in this region, until eventually it took the form of the French language that is known today. The Gaulish speech disappeared in the late Roman era, but remnants of its vocabulary survive in some French words, approximately 200, as well as place-names of Gaulish origin.

It is posited that some structural changes in French were shaped at least in part by Gaulish influence including diachronic sound changes and sandhi phenomena due to the retention of Gaulish phonetic patterns after the adoption of Latin, calques such as 'aveugle' ("blind", literally without eyes, from Latin ab oculis, which was a calque on the Gaulish word exsops with the same semantic construction as modern French) with other Celtic calques possibly including 'oui', the word for 'yes', while syntactic and morphological effects are also posited.

Other examples of substrate languages are the influence of the now extinct North Germanic Norn language on the Scots dialects of the Shetland and Orkney islands. In the Arab Middle East and North Africa, colloquial Arabic dialects, most especially Levantine, Egyptian, and Maghreb dialects, often exhibit significant substrata from other regional Semitic (especially Aramaic) and Berber languages. Yemeni Arabic has Modern South Arabian, Old South Arabian and Himyaritic substrata.

Typically, Creole languages have multiple substrata, with the actual influence of such languages being indeterminate.

=== Unattested substrata ===
In the absence of all three lines of evidence mentioned above, linguistic substrata may be difficult to detect. Substantial indirect evidence is needed to infer the former existence of a substrate. The nonexistence of a substrate is difficult to show, and to avoid digressing into speculation, the burden of proof must lie on the side of the scholar claiming the influence of a substrate. The principle of uniformitarianism and results from the study of human genetics suggest that many languages have formerly existed that have since then been replaced under expansive language families, such as Indo-European, Afro-Asiatic, Uralic or Bantu. However, it is not a given that such expansive languages would have acquired substratum influence from the languages they have replaced.

Several examples of this type of substratum have still been claimed. For example, the earliest form of the Germanic languages may have been influenced by a non-Indo-European language, purportedly the source of about one quarter of the most ancient Germanic vocabulary. There are similar arguments for a Sanskrit substrate, a Greek one, and a substrate underlying the Sami languages. Relatively clear examples are the Finno-Ugric languages of the Chude and the "Volga Finns" (Merya, Muromian, and Meshcheran): while unattested, their existence has been noted in medieval chronicles, and one or more of them have left substantial influence in the Northern Russian dialects.

By contrast, more contentious cases are the Vasconic substratum theory and Old European hydronymy, which hypothesize large families of substrate languages across western Europe. Some smaller-scale unattested substrates that remain under debate involve alleged extinct branches of the Indo-European family, such as "Nordwestblock" substrate in the Germanic languages, and a "Temematic" substrate in Balto-Slavic, proposed by Georg Holzer. The name Temematic is an abbreviation of "tenuis, media, media aspirata, tenuis", referencing a sound shift presumed common to the group.

When a substrate language or its close relatives cannot be directly studied, their investigation is rooted in the study of etymology and linguistic typology. The study of unattested substrata often begins from the study of substrate words, which lack a clear etymology. Such words can in principle still be native inheritance, lost everywhere else in the language family, but they might in principle also originate from a substrate. The sound structure of words of unknown origin — their phonology and morphology — can often suggest hints in either direction.

So can their meaning: words referring to the natural landscape, in particular indigenous fauna and flora, have often been found especially likely to derive from substrate languages. None of these conditions is sufficient by itself to claim any one word as originating from an unknown substratum. Occasionally words that have been proposed to be of substrate origin will be found out to have cognates in more distantly related languages after all, and therefore likely native: an example is Proto-Indo-European *mori 'sea', found widely in the northern and western Indo-European languages, but in more eastern Indo-European languages only in Ossetic.

=== Concept history ===
Although the influence of the prior language when a community speaks, and adopts, a new one may have been informally acknowledged beforehand, the concept was formalized and popularized initially in the late 19th century. As historical phonology emerged as a discipline, the initial dominant viewpoint was that influences from language contact on phonology and grammar should be assumed to be marginal, and an internal explanation should always be favored if possible. As articulated by Max Mueller in 1870, Es gibt keine Mischsprache ("there are no mixed languages"). In the 1880s, dissent began to crystallize against this viewpoint. Within Romance language linguistics, the 1881 Lettere glottologiche of Graziadio Isaia Ascoli argued that the early phonological development of French and other Gallo-Romance languages was shaped by the retention by Celts of their "oral dispositions" even after they had switched to Latin.

In 1884, Hugo Schuchardt's related but distinct concept of creole languages was used to counter Mueller's view. In modern historical linguistics, debate persists on the details of how language contact may induce structural changes. The respective extremes of "all change is contact" and "there are no structural changes ever" have largely been abandoned in favor of a set of conventions on how to demonstrate contact induced structural changes. These include adequate knowledge of the two languages in question, a historical explanation, and evidence that the contact-induced phenomenon did not exist in the recipient language before contact, among other guidelines.

== Superstratum ==
A superstratum (plural: superstrata) or superstrate offers the counterpart to a substratum. When a different language influences a base language to result in a new language, linguists label the influencing language a superstratum and the influenced language a substratum.

A superstrate may also represent an imposed linguistic element akin to what occurred with English and Norman after the Norman Conquest of 1066 when use of the English language carried low prestige. The international scientific vocabulary coinages from Greek and Latin roots adopted by European languages (and subsequently by other languages) to describe scientific topics (sociology, zoology, philosophy, botany, medicine, all "-logy" words, etc.) can also be termed a superstratum, although for this last case, "adstratum" might be a better designation (despite the prestige of science and of its language). In the case of French, for example, Latin is the superstrate and Gaulish the substrate.

Some linguists contend that Japanese (and Japonic languages in general) consists of an Altaic superstratum projected onto an Austronesian substratum. Some scholars also argue for the existence of Altaic superstrate influences on varieties of Chinese spoken in Northern China. In this case, however, the superstratum refers to influence, not language succession. Other views detect substrate effects.

== Adstratum ==
An adstratum (plural: adstrata) or adstrate is a language that influences another language by virtue of geographic proximity, not by virtue of its relative prestige. For example, early in England's history, Old Norse served as an adstrate, contributing to the lexical structure of Old English.

The phenomenon is less common today in standardized linguistic varieties and more common in colloquial forms of speech. Modern nations tend to favour a single linguistic variety, often corresponding to the dialect of the capital and other important regions, over others.

In India, where dozens of languages are widespread, many languages could be said to share an adstratal relationship, but Hindi is certainly a dominant adstrate in North India.

A different example would be the sociolinguistic situation in Belgium, where the French and Dutch languages have roughly the same status. They could justifiably be called adstrates to each other as each has provided a large set of lexical specifications to the other.

The term adstratum is also used to identify systematic influences or a layer of borrowings in a given language from another language, independently of whether the two languages continue coexisting as separate entities. Many modern languages have an appreciable adstratum from English, due both to the cultural influence and economic preponderance of the United States on international markets, and the earlier colonization by the British Empire that made English a global lingua franca. The Greek and Latin coinages adopted by European languages, including English and now languages worldwide, to describe scientific topics, sociology, medicine, anatomy, biology, all the '-logy' words, etc., are also justifiably called adstrata.

Another example is found in Spanish and Portuguese, which contain a heavy Semitic, particularly Arabic, adstratum. Yiddish is a linguistic variety of High German with adstrata from Hebrew and Aramaic, mostly in the sphere of religion. Slavic languages were linked geographically to Yiddish-speaking villages in Eastern Europe for centuries up until the Holocaust.

Swahili, spoken in East Africa, has a large amount of Arabic influence, with Arabic loanwords comprising a large part of its vocabulary due to centuries of trade and cultural exchange between Arab merchants and East African communities. It is estimated that 40% of the language's vocabulary is derived from Arabic loanwords.

== Notable examples of possible substrate or superstrate influence ==
=== Substrate influence on superstrate ===
Area	Resultant language	Substrate	Superstrate	Superstrate introduced by
Greece during the Early Helladic period	Ancient Greek	Pre-Greek substrate	Proto-Greek	Indo-European migrations into southern Europe
Bactria–Margiana Archaeological Complex	Classical Sanskrit	BMAC substrate	Vedic Sanskrit	Indo-European migrations into southern Central Asia
China (Baiyue), Northern Vietnam	Yue (Viet), Min, Au, Wu	Various Old Yue languages	Old Chinese	Sinicisation (Qin's campaign against the Yue tribes, Han campaigns against Minyue, and Southward expansion of the Han dynasty), between the first millennium BC and the first millennium AD
France	Gallo-Romance	Gaulish	Vulgar Latin	Romans who annexed it to the Roman Empire (1st century BC-7th century AD),
Portugal	Ibero-Romance	Paleohispanic languages	Vulgar Latin	Romans who annexed it to the Roman Empire (1st century BC-7th century AD),
Spain	Ibero-Romance	Paleohispanic languages	Vulgar Latin	Romans who annexed it to the Roman Empire (1st century BC-7th century AD),
Romania	Common Romanian	Daco-Thracian	Vulgar Latin	Romans who annexed it to the Roman Empire (1st century BC-7th century AD),
Levant	Levantine Arabic	Western Aramaic	Pre-classical Arabic	Arabs during the Muslim conquests
Egypt	Egyptian Arabic	Coptic	Pre-classical Arabic	Arabs during the Muslim conquests
Mesopotamia	Mesopotamian Arabic	Eastern Aramaic	Pre-classical Arabic	Arabs during the Muslim conquests
Yemen	Yemeni Arabic	Ancient South Arabian	Pre-classical Arabic	Arabs during the Muslim conquests
Maghreb (North Africa)	Maghrebi Arabic	Berber languages, Punic, Vandalic, and African Romance	Pre-classical Arabic	Arabs during the Muslim conquests
Ethiopia	Amharic	Central Cushitic languages	South Semitic languages	Bronze Age Semitic expansion
Eritrea/Ethiopia	Tigrinya, Tigré and Ge'ez	Central Cushitic and North Cushitic languages	South Semitic languages	Bronze Age Semitic expansion
Japan	Eastern Japanese	Ainu and Emishi	Old Japanese, Early Middle Japanese and Late Middle Japanese	Japanization of indigenous Ainu and Emishi populations in eastern Honshu and later Hokkaido
England	Old English	Common Brittonic and British Latin	Ingvaeonic languages	Anglo-Saxon settlement of Britain
Cornwall	Cornish English	Cornish	Early Modern English	Anglicisation of Cornish people
Ireland	Irish English	Irish	Early Modern English	the English during the Plantations of Ireland in the 16th century
Scotland	Scottish English	Middle Scots and Scottish Gaelic	Early Modern English	the English during Scottish Reformation in the 16th century
Jamaica	Jamaican Patois	African languages of transported enslaved Africans	Early Modern English	the English during British colonial rule in Jamaica
Nigeria	Nigerian Pidgin	Nigerian languages including Igbo, Yoruba, and Hausa	Early Modern English	British colonial rule of Nigeria
Canary Islands	Canarian Spanish	Guanche	Andalusian Spanish	Andalusians during the incorporation of the Canary Islands into the Crown of Castile
Mexico	Mexican Spanish	Nahuatl and other indigenous languages of Mexico	Spanish of the 16th century	Spaniards during the Spanish Conquest of the 16th century
Central Andes	Andean Spanish	Quechua, Aymaran languages	Spanish of the 16th century	Spaniards during the Spanish Conquest of the 16th century
Paraguay	Paraguayan Spanish	Guaraní	Spanish of the 16th century	Spaniards during the Spanish Conquest of the 16th century
Philippines	Chavacano	Tagalog, Ilokano, Hiligaynon, Cebuano, Bangingi, Sama, Tausug, Yakan, and Malay	Spanish of the 16th century	Spaniards during the Spanish Conquest of the 16th century
Brazil	Brazilian Portuguese	Tupi, Bantu languages	Portuguese of the 17th century	the Portuguese during the colonial period
Angola	Angolan Portuguese	Umbundu, Kimbundu, and Kikongo	Portuguese of the 17th century	the Portuguese during the colonial rule in Africa
Scotland	Scottish Gaelic	Pictish	Old to Middle Irish	The merger of Dál Riata with the Pictish kingdoms in the 9th century.
Shetland and Orkney	Insular Scots	Norn	Scots	Acquisition by Scotland in the 15th century
Norway	Bokmål	Old Norwegian	Danish	Union with Danish crown, 1380–1814.
Haiti	Haitian Creole	African languages of transported enslaved Africans	French of the 18th century	French colonial rule over Saint-Domingue
Argentina/Uruguay	Rioplatense Spanish	Neapolitan, various Italian Languages	Spanish	Italian immigration to Uruguay and Argentina
Belarus	Belarusian	Baltic languages	Old East Slavic	Assimilation of East Balts by East Slavs in the Middle Ages
Russia (Russian North)	North Russian	Finno-Ugric languages	Russian	Russification of the Chudes and Volga Finns
Israel	Modern Hebrew	German, Russian, Yiddish, Judeo-Arabic dialects, and other Jewish languages and languages spoken by Jews	Hebrew constructed from Biblical and mishnaic Hebrew	European Jewish immigrants in the late 19th and early 20th centuries who modernized and reintroduced Hebrew as a vernacular
Singapore	Singaporean Mandarin	Southern Chinese varieties: Hokkien, Teochew, Cantonese, Hainanese	Standard Mandarin	Singapore Government during the Speak Mandarin Campaign

=== Superstrate influence on substrate ===
Area	Resultant language	Substrate	Superstrate	Superstrate introduced by
Wales, Sub-Roman Britain	Old Welsh, Old Cornish, Old Breton and Cumbric	Common Brittonic	British Latin	Roman conquest of Britain
France	Old French	Gallo-Romance	Frankish	Merovingians' dominance of Gaul around 500
England	Middle English	Old English	Old Norman French	Normans during the Norman Conquest
Greece	Demotic Greek	Medieval Greek	Ottoman Turkish	Ottoman Turks following the Fall of Constantinople and during the subsequent occupation of Greece
Spain	Early Modern Spanish	Old Spanish	Arabic (by way of Mozarabic)	Umayyads during the conquest of Hispania, and the Arabic and Mozarabic speakers in al-Andalus who were absorbed into Castille and other Christian kingdoms during the Reconquista
Korea	Middle Korean	Old Korean	Middle Chinese	Linguistic Sinicization of Korean elites during the Silla and Goryeo periods
Vietnam	Middle Vietnamese	Old Vietnamese	Middle Chinese	Linguistic Sinicization of Vietnamese elites during the Eras of Northern Domination and pre-1400 Đại Việt
Malta	Maltese	Siculo-Arabic	Sicilian, later Italian and other Romance languages	Norman and Catalan-Aragonese control, establishment of the Knights of St. John on the islands in the 16th century
Romania, Moldova	Modern Romanian	Common Romanian, Old Romanian	Slavic languages (first Proto-Slavic, then Old Church Slavonic, and later individual Slavic languages such as Ukrainian, Polish, Russian, Serbian, and Bulgarian)	Slavic migrations to the Balkans, rule by the Bulgarian, Polish-Lithuanian, and Russian Empires followed by Soviet domination
Poland (Kashubia)	Kashubian	Pomeranian	Low German	German immigration to Pomerania during the Ostsiedlung, and periods of Teutonic and Prussian rule
Poland (Upper Silesia)	Silesian	Old Polish	Central German	German immigration to Silesia during the Ostsiedlung, and periods of Austrian and Prussian rule
Indonesia	Indonesian	Classical Malay	Dutch, to a lesser extent Portuguese	Over three centuries of Dutch colonial rule in the archipelago from 1610 to 1949, and prior Portuguese colonial rule during the 1500s

== See also ==
- Historical linguistics
- Language shift
- Language transfer
- Trans-cultural diffusion
- Pre-Greek substrate
- Graziadio Isaia Ascoli
- Creole language
- Relexification
- Proto-Indo-European language
