= Theo Vennemann =

German historical linguist (born 1937)

- Born: May 27, 1937 (age 89); Oberhausen-Sterkrade, Germany
- Occupation: Linguist

Academic work
- Institutions: LMU Munich
- Main interests: Historical linguistics, phonology, language change
- Notable works: Preference Laws for Syllable Structure (1988); Europa Vasconica – Europa Semitica (2003)
- Notable ideas: Preference laws; Vasconic substratum hypothesis

Theo Vennemann genannt Nierfeld (German: [ˈfɛnəman]; born 27 May 1937) is a German linguist and philologist. He is an emeritus professor of Germanic and theoretical linguistics at LMU Munich.

Vennemann has published on phonological theory, historical linguistics, and models of language change. His early work in phonological theory includes contributions to Natural Generative Phonology, and his later publications have influenced discussions of language change through his concept of linguistic preference laws.

Since the 1990s he has also advanced hypotheses about prehistoric language contact in Europe, including proposals involving a Vasconic substratum and Afroasiatic influence, which have been debated in historical linguistics.

== Career ==
Vennemann was born in Oberhausen-Sterkrade in Western Germany. He served as professor of Germanic and theoretical linguistics at LMU Munich from 1974 until his retirement in 2005, and is listed as emeritus faculty. LMU describes his academic responsibilities as including the history of German in its Indo-European context, general theory of language structure and change, typology, and the linguistic prehistory of Europe.

== Academic work ==
=== Preference laws and phonology ===
Vennemann is associated with work in phonological theory and the explanation of sound change. His monograph Preference Laws for Syllable Structure and the Explanation of Sound Change develops an approach that links diachronic change to preferred patterns of syllable structure. Preference laws became a central element of his work from the 1980s onward.

=== European linguistic prehistory ===
In Europa Vasconica – Europa Semitica (2003), Vennemann argues that prehistoric language contact played a major role in shaping western and northern European languages. In addition to a proposed Vasconic substratum, he suggests that Afroasiatic (Semitic) influence may have contributed lexical and structural features to parts of the Atlantic fringe of Europe. His proposals include the hypothesis that certain typological features of the Celtic languages may reflect ancient contact with Semitic-speaking populations, and that elements of early Germanic may have been influenced by Semitic or Punic contact in the western Mediterranean and Atlantic regions.

==== Reception ====
The hypotheses advanced in Europa Vasconica – Europa Semitica have received substantial criticism. Baldi and Page reject many of the proposed etymologies and methodological assumptions, while noting that the work seeks to highlight the role of language contact in European prehistory. From the perspective of onomastics, Jürgen Udolph offers an extended critique of Vennemann's interpretations of European river names and related claims about prehistoric substrata.

== Selected works ==
- Preference Laws for Syllable Structure and the Explanation of Sound Change (1988).
- Europa Vasconica – Europa Semitica (2003).
