= Vascones =

Pre-Roman people of the northern Iberian Peninsula

The Vascones (Basque: Baskoiak) were a pre-Roman people of the northern Iberian Peninsula, first named by Roman writers in connection with the Sertorian War of the 70s BC. Ancient authors place them around the western Pyrenees and the upper and middle Ebro, in country broadly corresponding to present-day Navarre and its borders, later organised within the Roman province of Hispania Tarraconensis.

The language they spoke, called Vasconic, is known mainly from personal and divine names. It is generally taken to be either an ancestral form or close relative of the Basque language, and it is grouped with Aquitanian in a single Basque-Aquitanian family. Their territory was nonetheless linguistically mixed, with Celtic and Iberian as well as Basque-type names. The traditional identification of the Vascones with the medieval and modern Basques, when it implies a straightforward and unbroken line of ethnic continuity, is now generally regarded as a construct of early modern and nationalist historiography.

The Vascones took shape among the Iron Age societies of the upper and middle Ebro, from which no distinctive archaeological culture sets them apart. They enter the historical record only with the Sertorian War. Under Roman rule they appear as an administrative rather than a political unit, their towns, among them Calagurris (modern Calahorra) and Pompaelo (Pamplona), set within the conventus Caesaraugustanus. Whether their territory grew at their neighbours' expense in this period is disputed. Recent scholarship has largely rejected the older thesis of a 'Vasconic expansion', treating the name instead as a label attached by Rome to a shifting territory.

The deities named on their votive altars carry Basque-type rather than Indo-European names, and set the Vascones apart from their neighbours in showing no blending with the Roman pantheon and no cult of the Matres. In late antiquity the sources depict the people raiding and in conflict with Visigoths and Franks, though modern accounts of their supposed independence and enduring paganism are much debated. Their name spread across the western Pyrenees, giving rise through Wasconia to Gascony. On the southern side the territory fed into the origins of the Kingdom of Pamplona.

== Name ==
=== Attestations ===
The first explicit mention of the Vascones occurs in a fragment of Livy relating the campaigns of Quintus Sertorius in the winter of 77/76 BC, where the army is said to march through the ager Vasconum ('territory of the Vascones'). Sallust refers to the people shortly afterwards, when Pompey withdrew remotus in Vascones to obtain grain in 75 BC. Strabo names them among the mountain peoples of the north and again in his description of the country between the Pyrenees and the Idubeda, while Pliny the Elder lists them along the Pyrenees and gives the first direct mention of the saltus Vasconum on the Bay of Biscay. Pomponius Mela, a contemporary of Pliny, describes the same stretch of the Cantabrian coast but names only the Cantabri and Varduli, not the Vascones. The fullest account is that of Ptolemy, who lists a coastal settlement and a long series of inland towns. A late reference in Prudentius, who calls the Ebro a Vascon river, shows the name still in literary use around AD 400. (Note: An earlier notice in Avienius' Ora maritima, which places the Ebro among inquieti vascones, is generally set aside: the poem and its sources are of uncertain date, and the passage is unlikely to derive from the archaic material Avienius elsewhere reworks.)

=== Etymology ===
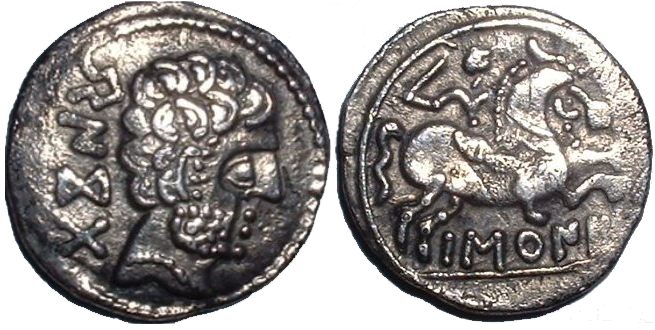
A coin with BARSCUNES in Iberian script. It has been proposed that the word is related to Vascones.

The ethnonym is usually connected with the coin legend barskunes (or baskunes), struck by a mint generally placed in Vascon territory. (Note: The equation of the legend with the ethnonym has been contested. Francisco Beltrán Lloris and Javier Velaza set out several obstacles to it, among them phonological difficulties (the vocalism, the loss of the rhotic, and a betacism) and the improbability that a people, rather than a city, would have struck the coinage.) Fernando Villar reconstructed an underlying place name of Indo-European appearance, and Fernando Wulff Alonso has argued that the Roman adoption of the name follows the same pattern as Callaeci, a local designation taken up and generalised by Rome. The legend has been read as a Celtic exonym meaning 'the highlanders', applied to the Vascones by neighbouring Celtic speakers.

== Language ==
The language of the ancient Vascones, which Joaquín Gorrochategui calls Vasconic, is genetically related both to Aquitanian, the variety documented in Aquitania, and to the historical Basque language attested without a break from the Middle Ages. The three are grouped as one language family, Basque-Aquitanian. The indigenous names attested in Vascon territory under the Empire are far fewer than those of Aquitania, which Gorrochategui reads as a sign of relatively early onomastic Romanisation.

The Vasconic language is far less documented than the neighbouring Iberian and Celtiberian, and was long known almost entirely from onomastics. The personal names of the territory fall into the same strata, with Celtic names in western Navarre around Estella and Iberian names to the east. The Basque-type names are represented above all by the funerary stele of Lerga, whose names Ummesahar, Narhungesi and Abisunhari were read by Luis Michelena as representatives of the autochthonous Vascon onomastics, close to the Aquitanian names recorded north of the Pyrenees. The 2021 discovery of the Hand of Irulegi, a bronze hand from the Irulegi hillfort whose inscription opens with sorioneku, compared with Basque zorioneko ('of good fortune'), challenged the assumption that the Vascones were pre-literate. Some scholars have read it as the earliest known text in the Vasconic language. (Note: The hillfort was destroyed by fire in the early 1st century BC, probably during the Sertorian War, with the hand deposited by then, while the script is dated to around the 2nd century BC. The editors classify the writing as a distinct Palaeohispanic sub-system, a Vasconic script derived from a non-dual variety of the Iberian semi-syllabary and marked by a sign otherwise known only from the Vascon-mint legends oTtikes and uTanbaate. They read the text as a votive or apotropaic dedication, though several readings remain uncertain.)

The territory later called Vasconia was linguistically mixed. Wulff Alonso counts at least four languages there in Roman times, with an Indo-European and Celtiberian component in the upper Ebro and the district of Estella, Iberian influence in the middle and lower Ebro, and a Basque-type stratum in the centre. Of the place names in the area, only Pompaelo among the Vascones and Oiasso on the coast are securely of Basque type. The latter lies in territory the sources assign to the Varduli.

== Ethnic identity ==
The equation of the Vascones with the medieval and modern Basques, and the assumption that their territory preserved an unbroken pre-Roman identity, are treated by recent scholarship as constructs of early modern and nationalist historiography rather than as findings of the ancient record.

The linguistic evidence, however, is independent of questions of ethnic continuity. Gorrochategui holds that the doubt once raised by Manuel Gómez-Moreno over any Basque presence in antiquity has been removed by the indigenous names recovered in the region since the 1960s, which he takes to attest a Basque-related language among the Vascones themselves. (Note: Names of the same Basque type appear beyond the Vascon core, in the upper Cidacos and Linares valleys of the Soria and Rioja highlands, among them Sesenco, from Basque zezen ('bull'). Gorrochategui explains them either as a pocket predating the Celticisation of the Ebro or, more likely, as settlers from Vascon territory in Roman times, drawn along transhumance routes and bound to the control of Calagurris.) Gorrochategui locates the line ancestral to the historical Basque language in the western area, where he holds that the common ancestor of the later Basque dialects formed by convergence among western Pyrenean varieties. On this view, the Vasconic linguistic material would stand closer to later Basque, sharing some of its innovations, whereas the northern Aquitanian variety is the more divergent. Proto-Basque, the earliest reconstructed stage preceding contacts with Latin, is dated by linguists to the first centuries BC. Common Basque, the common language from which all historical Basque dialects diverged, belongs not to the pre-Roman period but to a phase between late antiquity and the early Middle Ages (5th–6th centuries AD).

== Geography ==
=== Territory ===
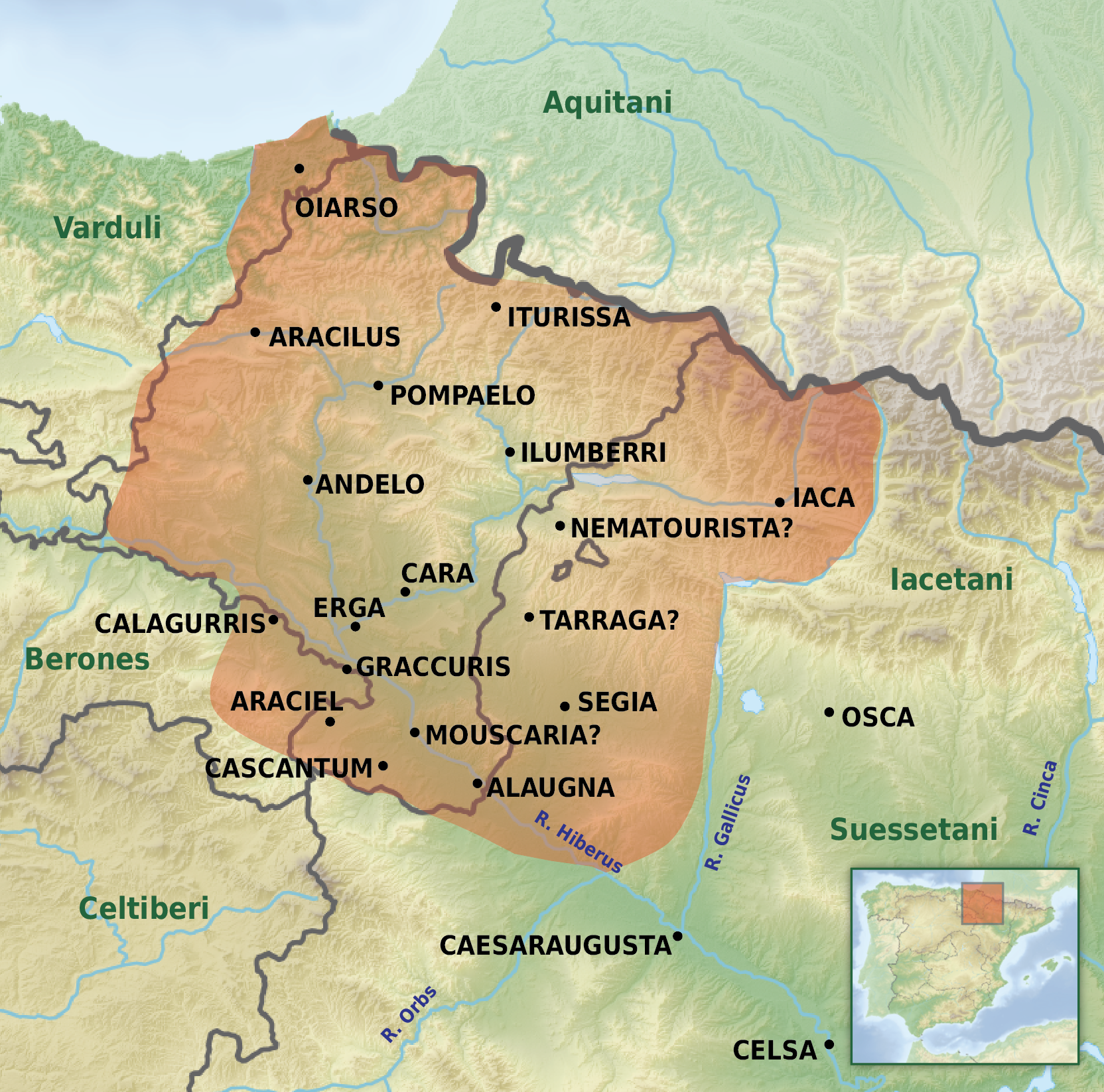
Territory of the Vascones

Ancient writers placed the Vascones around the western Pyrenees and the middle and upper Ebro. From the towns Ptolemy ascribes to them, their territory has been reconstructed as extending well beyond present-day Navarre: to the coast of Gipuzkoa at Oiasso, along the right bank of the Ebro in La Rioja as far as Calagurris, across the Cinco Villas of Aragón and into part of Huesca, including Iacca.

Their neighbours were the Varduli and Berones to the west, the Iacetani and Ilergetes to the east, the Celtiberians to the south, and the Pyrenees and Aquitani to the north. The inland towns Ptolemy assigns to them include Pompaelo, Andelos, Iacca, Graccurris, Calagurris, Cascantum, Ergavica, Tarraga, Muscaria, Segia and Alauona, together with coastal Oiasso.

Two features of the country recur in the sources. Livy's ager Vasconum lay near the Ebro between Calagurris and the frontier of the Berones around Vareia, though whether Sertorius crossed it on the northern or the southern bank of the river is debated. (Note: Esther Cantón Serrano notes that the identification of pre-Roman Vareia with the site of La Custodia at Viana, on the northern bank, would place the ager Vasconum north of the Ebro rather than south of it.) Pliny locates a saltus Vasconum, a wooded upland district, on the Pyrenean side towards the ocean. The written evidence does not, however, allow precise borders to be drawn. The notices are late, brief and discontinuous, they derive almost entirely from a Roman-centred perspective, and the ascription of the Ebro towns and of Oiasso to the Vascones is itself contested. Ptolemy's list in particular is regarded as unreliable, since he displaces the Iacetani far to the east, drops the Lacetani altogether and makes the Vascones and Ilergetes immediate neighbours, an arrangement found in no earlier source.

=== Vasconic expansion theory ===
A long-standing interpretation holds that the Vascones expanded during the Roman period into land held by the Varduli, the Iacetani and the Celtiberians. It rests on discrepancies between successive sources, above all the absence of the Vascones from Pomponius Mela's coast and their presence there in Ptolemy, and the ascription to them of Ebro towns of older Iberian and Celtiberian tradition. Guillermo Fatás set it out at length in 1972, and in most versions Rome is the driving force. (Note: An earlier version by Adolf Schulten cast the Vascones themselves as the conquerors rather than Rome.)

Much recent work denies that any real expansion took place. Esther Cantón Serrano finds that no literary source attests any territorial change, and that the expansion is a modern reading imposed on the texts. Fernando Wulff Alonso explains it as an artefact of the Roman use of old ethnic names as territorial labels, reading Livy's ager Vasconum as a bare geographical term and taking Calagurris, which lay beyond it, to have belonged to the Celtiberian world. Francisco Pina Polo argues that the Ebro cities Ptolemy assigns to the Vascones, among them Calagurris, Graccurris, Cascantum and Alauona, were Celtiberian, most likely of the Lusones, down to at least 76 BC. (Note: Pina Polo adds that no source attests an alliance between the Vascones and Rome before the Sertorian War, that the army's search for grain there need not imply a friendly reception, and that Rome commonly gave collective names, such as Callaeci, Astures and Celtiberi, to populations that had not borne them or formed a single people before.) Ángel A. Jordán Lorenzo holds that the impression of expansion arises from reading sources of different dates as a record of annexations, that Oiasso on the coast and the Ebro towns of Graccurris and Cascantum are ascribed to the Vascones by Ptolemy alone, and that their borders can be reconstructed only for the period before Roman rule.

Timo Klär dissents in part, holding that the territory did grow, though through Roman-sanctioned reassignment rather than conquest. Following Javier Velaza, he takes Graccurris and Calagurris to have passed from the Celtiberian to the Vascon sphere already in the Republic, and, since only six of the nine peoples the earliest sources place south of the Pyrenees still appear in Pliny and Ptolemy, argues that the Vascones absorbed the vanished Iacetani and Suessetani in the east and part of the Varduli in the west between the late Republic and Augustus' reorganisation of 27 BC. He rejects Pina Polo's denial of any territorial change, while holding that such growth could only have come about with Roman agreement.

== History ==
=== Iron Age ===
The Vascones are best understood as a product of the Iron Age societies of the upper and middle Ebro, reshaped by the arrival of Rome, rather than as a fixed ethnic block reaching back into prehistory. No distinct archaeological culture can be isolated for them. The material remains of the area belong to the wider horizons of the upper Ebro and the western Pyrenees, and such connections as can be traced point towards the Ebro rather than towards a self-contained highland zone. The country was in any case culturally and linguistically mixed, combining Iberian, Celtiberian and Basque-type elements.

The principal excavated Iron Age site in the territory is the fortified hilltop settlement of Irulegi, occupied until the early 1st century BC, when it was destroyed by fire, probably during the Sertorian War. Its excavation yielded the Hand of Irulegi, a bronze hand whose inscription, in a script of about the 2nd century BC, is the earliest indigenous text known from the region and has been read as Vasconic. From the mid-2nd century BC the communities of the middle Ebro also struck coin, in issues that follow the forms of neighbouring mints rather than any distinctive local stamp (see below).

=== Roman conquest ===
The name Vascones is absent from the accounts of the Roman conquest of the Ebro valley in the 2nd century BC, in which their neighbours regularly appear, and the ethnonym enters the record only with the Sertorian War. (Note: Timo Klär, by contrast, traces Roman dealings with the Vascones back to the early 2nd century through two towns later reckoned to them. In 179 BC the propraetor Tiberius Sempronius Gracchus founded Graccurris on the site of the earlier settlement of Ilurcis to mark his victory over the Celtiberians, the first Roman town to bear its founder's name. Klär takes the place, later assigned to the Vascones, to have passed from the Celtiberian sphere at about this date and to have been settled with Vascones and Celtiberians together, perhaps as a buffer against the still-hostile Celtiberian country. The bronze of Asculum of 89 BC, by which Gnaeus Pompeius Strabo gave Roman citizenship to a cavalry unit called the turma Salluitana, lists among its soldiers men from Segia and from Ilurcis, which Manuel Gómez-Moreno and Klär count as Vascon. On this reckoning about a third of the unit were Vascones enfranchised early in the 1st century BC, which Klär treats as the earliest evidence both of Vascones in Roman service and of the tie of clientage between them and the family of Pompey.) In the fragment of Livy, Sertorius wintered at Castra Aelia, moved up the Ebro ravaging the territories of Bursao, Cascantum and Graccurris, reached Calagurris, and led his army across the ager Vasconum to encamp on the border of the Berones before turning towards Vareia. Sallust records the withdrawal of Pompey into the country of the Vascones for supplies in 75 BC, and Appian adds that Pompey and Metellus came down from the Pyrenees to the Ebro in the same year. The foundation of Pompaelo, which Strabo glosses as 'Pompeiopolis', has traditionally been placed during this war and credited to Pompey himself, who is supposed to have wintered in Vascon country in 75/74 BC. Adolf Schulten's reconstruction to this effect rests on his emendation of a passage of Plutarch, in which Pompey in fact winters among the Vaccaei, not the Vascones. Francisco Pina Polo rejects the emendation and finds no source that places a winter camp of Pompey in Vascon territory, so that the only secure link between Pompey and the Vascones is the expedition for grain. On this view the foundation of Pompaelo, if it was Pompey's work at all, is better set after the war, in 72 or 71 BC, perhaps as a settlement for peoples he had defeated and deported. (Note: Pina Polo notes that the attribution rests essentially on Strabo, and that Strabo's gloss may itself be a false etymology drawn from the resemblance of Pompaelo to Pompey's name. Klär reads the new town as Pompey's reward to the Vascones who had supported him, whereas others treat it instead as a punishment imposed after a Roman victory over them. Jordán Lorenzo turns the usual reconstruction around. He takes the Vascones to have sided with Sertorius, since Calagurris, which every source calls Vascon, was a firm partisan of his, and he reads the founding of Pompaelo not as a reward but as a means of keeping watch over a people that had opposed Pompey, and over the road towards Aquitania. He agrees with Pina Polo that no source places a winter camp of Pompey in Vascon country, the standing camp of 75/74 BC having been brief and the search for grain belonging nearer the Ebro.)

The Vascones reappear in the civil war between Caesar and Pompey. After Caesar's victory at Ilerda in 49 BC, the Vascon towns of Iacca, Calagurris and Graccurris, which had earlier sided with Sertorius, went over to Caesar and were soon raised to the rank of municipium, some with Latin and some with full Roman right. Pompaelo, a foundation of Pompey's that stayed loyal to him, was left a stipendiary community, a standing it kept into the early Principate. Klär takes this both as a further instance of Vascon accommodation to Rome and as the reason for Pompaelo's low rank in Pliny's account.

=== Roman period ===
The Vascones took no part in the Cantabrian Wars of 29 to 19 BC, in which the sources name only their neighbours the Astures and Cantabri as Rome's enemies, a silence Klär reads as a sign that the Vascones remained on good terms with Rome into the Augustan age.

Under the Principate the Vascones appear as an administrative rather than a political unit. Pliny lists their towns within the conventus Caesaraugustanus, and records Andelos and Pompaelo as stipendiary communities, the least favoured status. An inscription from Rome, the funerary text of the senator Gaius Mocconius Verus, records that as military tribune of the legio VII Gemina he was charged ad census accipiendos civitatium XXIIII Vasconum et Vardulorum ('to take the census of the twenty-four communities of the Vascones and Varduli'). (Note: The reading of the numeral is not settled. Fernando Wulff Alonso gives thirty-four, while Francisco Beltrán Lloris and Javier Velaza read twenty-four, a figure that agrees with the fourteen Varduli communities of Pliny and the sixteen Vascon communities of Ptolemy, thirty in all, of which the census would have covered only a part.) The two peoples belonged to different conventus, the Vascones to the conventus Caesaraugustanus and the Varduli to the conventus Cluniensis, so that the census cut across the two, though Beltrán Lloris and Velaza caution that this does not imply the transfer of any community from one to the other. The whole of the Vascon territory lay within the conventus Caesaraugustanus, whose capital Caesaraugusta was a colony of veterans, while the Celtiberi, Varduli, Autrigones, Caristii, Cantabri and Astures were placed in the conventus Cluniensis. This division has been read as reflecting the higher degree of Romanisation ascribed to the Vascones, though Klär prefers to explain it by distance from each conventus capital.

Auxiliary units bearing the name, such as the cohorts of Vascones with Roman citizenship, and the presence of men from Calagurris in the guard of the future Augustus, point in the same direction, towards a name that functioned within the Roman military and fiscal system. Calagurris itself was raised to a Roman municipium, the municipium Calagurris Iulia, about 26 BC. Klär connects the grant with the bodyguard of Calagurritani that the future Augustus had kept and then dismissed after Actium in 31 BC, and observes that the town, later the birthplace of the rhetorician Quintilian and the poet Prudentius, was the leading centre of the territory throughout the Empire. (Note: Klär further suggests that the scarcity of distinctively Vascon material remains and burials under the Empire reflects an elite that had taken up Roman forms, including Roman burial, rather than the loss of a Vascon identity, which may have continued in ways that leave no archaeological trace.)

=== Late antiquity ===
Under Diocletian's reorganisation of the provinces at the close of the 3rd century, Hispania became the diocese of the Hispaniae, and the former Hispania citerior was split into the provinces of Tarraconensis, Gallaecia and Carthaginensis. The Vascon territory, part of the conventus Caesaraugustanus, is generally reckoned to have stayed within the Tarraconensis, although both the provincial boundaries and the date at which the reform took effect in Hispania are disputed.

The Visigothic Kingdom circa 560. The Vascones in the north.

In late-antique and medieval writing the Vascones acquire a reputation for ferocity and raiding. Juan José Larrea and Mikel Pozo argue that this image is in large part a literary topos, applied to historical events by Isidore of Seville and later authors and shaped by an established tradition of Latin poetry. The sources of the 5th to 8th centuries record repeated conflicts between the Vascones and the Visigoths and Franks. There is broad agreement that the region attained a situation of independence in fact after the collapse of Roman power, lasting at least until the campaign of Leovigild, but the explanation of the conflicts is much disputed: the Vascones have been cast as aggressors driven by the poverty of their country, as victims of Visigothic and Frankish expansion, and as local powers exploiting a frontier position between the two kingdoms.

The chronology of the region's Christianisation and the related claim of a tenacious late paganism have been equally contested. Larrea and Pozo hold that Christianisation should be understood as a process, as elsewhere in the West, and that the evidence usually adduced for a distinctively late Vascon paganism, such as the Vita Amandi and the account by Taio of the sack of Zaragoza in 653, is weak.

Archaeology has transformed the picture since the discovery in 1987 of the cemetery of Aldaieta, at Nanclares de Gamboa in Álava. A series of cemeteries dated between the mid-6th and the early 8th century, extending from Pamplona towards Bilbao, shows furnished burials with weapons of Aquitanian and Merovingian type. These do not derive from a pre-Roman highland survival, nor do they represent Visigothic outposts, and they indicate a society integrated into the wider world north of the Pyrenees rather than an isolated Basque redoubt. After the Muslim conquest of 711 the suburban cemeteries of Pamplona remained in use for a further two generations, a continuity that Larrea and Pozo connect with the genesis, on the periphery of al-Andalus, of the polity that became the Kingdom of Pamplona. It was in late antiquity, too, that the name spread and shifted, the form wasco giving rise through Wasconia to the later Gascony.

== Settlement and material culture ==
The fullest survey of Vascon settlement in the Roman period is that of María Jesús Peréx Agorreta, who describes a densely occupied and stable landscape whose remains are most abundant under the Principate. In the fertile southern lowlands along the Ebro, the ager Vasconum, the countryside was organised in the Roman manner around a network of rustic villae, and its inhabitants took up Roman forms early. The upland Pyrenean valleys of the saltus Vasconum remained less permeable to them, with sparser settlement closer to indigenous village patterns. The sharper cultural and political version of this contrast between ager and saltus, which set a Romanised lowland against an unromanised and independent highland, has since been questioned. Peréx cautions that the two zones cannot be separated by a clean line and that each contains internal subzones. Urbanism never reached large proportions. Calagurris was a medium-sized town of some 10 to 20 hectares, while Andelos, Cara, Cascantum, Graccurris and Pompaelo were small, between 5 and 10 hectares. Ptolemy treats every settlement he names as a city, a rank Peréx regards as generous for several of them, and attributes the difference from Pliny's account chiefly to the interval between the two authors. Settlement followed the river valleys and the roads, above all the route that ran up the Ebro from Tarraco through Caesaraugusta towards the interior, which linked the main towns of the valley and gave access to the Meseta and the Duero. (Note: A study of the road network by Klär makes Caesaraugusta the hub for the Vascon territory, from which the road to Pompaelo branched, and its milestones show that this route stayed in use into late antiquity.)

A group of mints active in the Ebro region from the mid-2nd century BC has long been treated as a single Vascon series, among them the workshop that struck the barskunes legend, taken since the 19th century as the ancestor of Roman Pompaelo. Cruces Blázquez Cerrato's review of these issues finds no distinctively Vascon coinage: they share the general features of minting in the Ebro valley, and a single workshop's successive series can themselves diverge, so that the label reflects a modern grouping rather than an ethnic reality. The earliest issues imitate the coinage of the neighbouring Berones in type, style and weight, which Blázquez Cerrato reads as the route by which Celtiberian forms reached the Vascon area, through the Berones rather than directly from the Celtiberians. The mints that can be tied to a known site and are named in the literary sources all lie on the eastern and southern edges of the territory, and the series end with the Sertorian War, remaining in circulation into Augustan times. That these workshops struck coin need not mark them as Vascon, since minting was in general a costly obligation rather than a privilege tied to a community's standing. Beltrán Lloris and Velaza argue that the usual lists of 'Vascon mints' rest on iconographic and linguistic criteria rather than ethnicity, to the point that they may include none of the cities the literary sources call Vascon. Taking Ptolemy as their guide, they count as Vascon only the mints of Iacca, Calagurris, Cascantum, Segia, Alauona and, probably, Ergavica, whose legends and types show not a common stamp but the same mixture of Celtic, Iberian and Basque-type elements as the region's place and personal names. On this view the exclusion of these cities from the 'Vascon' series, and their assignment to the Celtiberians, the Suessetani or others, follows from an essentialist picture that ties the Vascones to modern Navarre and the Basque language.

== Society ==
The onomastics of the dedicators named on Vascon altars are predominantly Latin in structure, though many individuals can be shown to be of indigenous origin, so that on one reading Vascon society appears more thoroughly integrated into Roman forms than that of some of its neighbours. Among the dedicators on the altars with Vascon theonyms, only one, on the altar of Izcue to Itsacurrinne, bears an indigenous name and filiation, in contrast with Aquitania, where indigenous names are much more common among such dedicators.

The nominal graffiti scratched on pottery in the extramural quarters of Pompaelo point the same way. Dated to the late 2nd and 3rd centuries AD, they carry Latin and Greek names, with a single item that may be Celtiberian and none that is clearly indigenous, which Mercedes Unzu Urmeneta and Pablo Ozcáriz Gil read as showing that the ordinary population, the artisans and inhabitants rather than the municipal elite, was by then fully drawn into Roman forms. One of the graffiti, written partly in Latin and partly in Greek letters, records an intermediate stage in the writing of a single name.

== Religion ==
The religion of the Vascones is known almost entirely from votive altars of the Roman period. The divine names they carry make up most of the surviving Vasconic linguistic material and outnumber the recorded personal names. Thirteen such altars, naming seven deities, have been published from Navarre. The wider set of altars with theonyms of the same Basque type, which reaches into Álava and Zuberoa, comes to fifteen altars and nine deities. Most of the deities are attested at a single place. Larahe and Losae, however, are found at several sites in the Salado valley, and on the evidence of two altars published in 2025 and a further dedication from Larunbe, Larahe has the widest range of any Vascon deity, from Andelos in the south to Larunbe in the north, which points to a regional rather than a purely local cult.

Joaquín Gorrochategui and José Luis Ramírez Sádaba find that the deities named on them, among them Errensae, Itsacurrinne, Lacubegi, Larahe, Losa, Selatse and Urde, carry Basque rather than Indo-European etymologies, several of them referring to farming and to certain animals: Larahe has been linked to Basque larre ('pasture'), Selatse to zelai ('field'), and Urde to urde ('pig'). Luis Michelena linked the theonym Losae, whose nominative would be Losa, with Basque lotsa ('shame' or 'fear').

This distinguishes the Vascon pantheon sharply from those of their neighbours, whose gods can be explained within the Indo-European sphere. It is also marked by the absence of syncretism with Roman deities and by the absence of the Matres, whose cult resumes only in Beronian and Celtiberian country. Figured representations are rare, the clearest being the altar of Lacubegi from Ujué, which bears a bull's head on its side. The dedications range from the mid-1st century BC to the 2nd century AD, most of them falling in the 1st century AD, a pattern the authors read as the gradual disuse of ancestral cults under advancing Romanisation.
