= Vasconic languages =

Proposed language family including Basque and Aquitanian

Vasconic
- Geographic distribution: France, Spain
- Subdivisions: Aquitanian (Aquitanian proper and Vasconic) †; Basque; ? Iberian †

Language codes
- ISO 639-5: euq
- Glottolog: None
- Notes: † denotes an extinct language

The Vasconic languages (from Latin vasco 'Basque'), also called Euskarian or Basque-Aquitanian, are a putative language family that includes Basque and the extinct Aquitanian language (also called Vasco-Aquitanian), spoken in ancient times by the Vasco-Aquitanian peoples. Aquitanian was itself probably divided into several dialects or languages. Joaquín Gorrochategui distinguishes Aquitanian proper, the language of the Aquitani in the north, from Vasconic, the language of the Vascones in the south.

While specialists agree that Basque and Aquitanian are genetically related, the status of the family itself remains uncertain. It is debated whether Aquitanian (or one of its dialects) is the direct ancestor of Basque (in which case it would not constitute a language family but a single language lineage), or whether the two instead represent sister languages descended from a common ancestor (making the language family valid). The extinct Iberian languages are sometimes tentatively included in this family, although this remains controversial.

== Ancient evidence ==
The ancient stage of the family has left no continuous text. It is known almost only from personal and divine names, chiefly those of the Aquitanian of Roman times, preserved in Latin inscriptions of the 1st to 3rd centuries AD. Because this material is purely onomastic, and a name reflects the sounds and word-formation of its language but not its meaning, some forms remain difficult to classify. The task is made harder by the absence of any contemporary related language against which the forms could be checked, unlike the Gaulish available for Celtiberian.

Joaquín Gorrochategui's 1984 survey assembled more than 600 of these onomastic elements, and about a hundred more have since been found, some of them outside the historically Basque-speaking area. Most come from north of the Pyrenees, along the Garonne and densest in its upper basin and on the plain of the Gers, whereas the regions where Basque was later spoken have yielded very little, a single name in Gipuzkoa and none in Biscay. Names of Vasconic type reach as far south as the uplands of Soria and La Rioja, evidence that the language covered a considerably wider area in Roman times than in the historical period. The names are transmitted through Latin epigraphy and carry Latin inflection, but comparison with historical Basque matches several of them to later common nouns, among them kinship terms, names of animals and colours, and numerals. For instance, Cison corresponds to gizon ('man'), Andere to andre ('woman'), and Sesenco to zezen ('bull'). This yields information about the phonology and vocabulary of the language, but because the inscriptions contain no sentences they reveal almost nothing of its grammar. The Hand of Irulegi, discovered in 2021 and dated to the 1st century BC, bears a short inscription that may be written in Vasconic, a dialect of Aquitanian. It reads sorioneku ⋅ kunekebeekiŕateŕe/ /n oTiŕtan ⋅ eseakaŕi eŕaukon.

== Internal classification ==
There is broad scholarly agreement that Aquitanian was a Paleo-European language genetically related to Basque, but the nature of that relationship is disputed. Part of the difficulty is that the term Aquitanian is used in two senses. In a narrow sense it denotes only the language spoken by the Aquitani north of the Pyrenees. In the broad sense it takes in the whole set of related ancient varieties on both slopes of the mountain range, Aquitanian proper in the north together with Vasconic, the far more sparsely attested language of the Vascones in the south. Taken broadly, Aquitanian therefore covers the ancient domain to which the ancestor of Basque itself belongs. Because the northern and southern records are each too sparse to be analysed on their own, scholars have conventionally pooled them and treated the whole as one language, called Aquitanian, a working simplification rather than a claim that the two were identical.

Geographical extent of the Vasco-Aquitanian dialects in Roman times. Blue dots: place names; red dots: epigraphic traces; blue patch: maximum territorial extension.

The scholarly dispute over ancestry has focused on the far more attested northern material. R. L. Trask held it so close to Basque that it can be treated, for practical purposes, as its more-or-less direct ancestor, whereas Lyle Campbell judged the differences large enough for it to be instead a sister language, each representing a branch descending from an original proto-language. The linguist Koldo Ulibarri notes that the surviving evidence is too scarce to prove either. Gorrochategui finds Campbell's sister-language reading credible. He concludes that a real but unmeasurable difference separated the attested Aquitanian material from the ancestor of historical Basque, perhaps no greater than the differences among the modern Basque dialects, which are counted as one language, perhaps larger, but that the question cannot be settled since the grammatical evidence and connected texts needed to decide are lacking. (Note: The comparison rests on a small set of lexical cognates found in names, mostly terms for age, sex and kinship, and lacks the grammatical correspondences that would more firmly establish the relationship. Gorrochategui adds that the impression of direct descent is partly an artefact of the method, the cognates being selected in advance to agree with the known history of Basque, so that inferring descent rather than a collateral relationship "may be a methodological corollary more than a reflection of the reality".)

The reconstructed stages of the Basque language are Common Basque (5th–6th centuries AD), the common language from which all historical Basque dialects diverged, and Proto-Basque (first centuries BC), an earlier stage preceding contacts with Latin. (Note: Some scholars further divide Proto-Basque into sub-phases, such as Joseba Lakarra's subdivision between Pre-Proto-Basque and Old Proto-Basque.) The study of Latin and later Romance loanwords in Basque has been a principal source for the reconstruction of Proto-Basque, since their datable sound changes anchor a relative chronology of the language's development. According to Gorrochategui, the consensual dating of Common Basque to the period between Late Antiquity and the Early Middle Ages, rather than to the pre-Roman tribal period, means that the distinction between Aquitanian and Vasconic cannot simply be identified with an early stage of the later dialectal division of Basque.

José Ignacio Hualde notes that Aquitanian in the broad sense was spoken over a vast area, with names of Aquitanian origin found as far south as Soria in Castile, and so probably comprised several dialects. On his account Basque may have descended from one of them, although it remains uncertain which of the attested names belong to the direct ancestor of Basque and which to related sister dialects. He uses the term Proto-Basque-Aquitanian for the reconstructed common ancestor of Proto-Basque and the other Aquitanian dialects. Javier de Hoz likewise argues that the native inscriptions from Aquitania and Navarre may underlie a set of related dialects, or possibly a small language family. Within this broad Aquitanian domain, Gorrochategui locates the line ancestral to historical Basque in the west, where he holds that the common ancestor of the later Basque dialects formed by convergence among western Pyrenean varieties. On this view, the southern Vasconic material would stand closer to later Basque, sharing some of its innovations, whereas the northern Aquitanian proper would be the more divergent of the attested varieties.

The following trees set out the scenarios that have been proposed. In the first, Aquitanian as attested north of the Pyrenees is essentially the ancestor of Basque, as proposed by Trask. In the second, it is a sister dialect or language of Basque. Campbell treats it as an extinct sister language, and Gorrochategui specifies this by splitting the attested material into a northern Aquitanian proper and a southern Vasconic grouped with the western varieties from which Basque would descend. Hualde's account, on which Basque comes from one of several Aquitanian dialects without it being settled which, belongs to this same family of scenarios. (Note: A tree can only approximate Gorrochategui's account, since he holds that Common Basque formed by convergence among the western Pyrenean varieties rather than descending from a single one.)

Proto-Basque as equivalent to Aquitanian (Trask)

- Proto-Basque (Aquitanian)
  - Common Basque
    - Modern Basque dialects

Northern Aquitanian and southern Vasconic as sister dialects or languages (Campbell; refined by Gorrochategui)

- Proto-Basque-Aquitanian
  - Northern Aquitanian proper (extinct sister)
  - Southern Vasconic and other western varieties
    - Common Basque
      - Modern Basque dialects

== Classification of Iberian ==
Writing in the 1st century AD, Strabo mentions that "the Aquitanians differ from the Gallic nation in their bodily build and in their language, being more similar to the Iberians." However, the idea that Basque and Iberian are related lost favour in the 20th century, following key decipherments of Iberian scripts by Manuel Gómez Moreno in 1925 and the critical reassessments of that relationship by Antonio Tovar and Luis Michelena in the 1950s..

Although some recent research, including by Eduardo Orduña and Joan Ferrer i Jané, have revisited the connection in the early 21st century (focusing primarily on numerals and some lexical items), the theory that Basque and Iberian are genetically related remains controversial among linguists. Most scholars accept that some similarities between Basque, Aquitanian and Iberian do exist, but they divide over whether the agreements come from contact and borrowing or from a shared ancestor. All agree that Iberian texts cannot at present be read through Basque.

=== Vasco-Iberian theory ===
In a 2019 survey of the question, Eduardo Orduña lists the following agreements between Basque and Iberian: the phonological system, the genitive ending -en, the derivational suffixes -taŕ and -ko, the verbal form ekiar, some points of nominal and verbal morphology, the word order of the noun phrase, a few words of cultural or commercial vocabulary, and the system of numerals. He regards the numerals as the strongest case, which according to him would point to a common origin. The Iberian sequence oŕkei-abaŕ, for instance, matches Basque hogei-ta-hamar ('thirty', literally 'twenty and ten') in the Basque base-twenty system.

According to Orduña, the closest matches between Iberian and the Basque-Aquitanian material are in personal names. Iberian elements such as baiser, beleś/bels, iltun and laur have near-identical Aquitanian counterparts, a set so much larger than the lexical parallels that Michelena spoke of a shared "onomastic pool". Joaquín Gorrochategui rejects most of these as evidence of kinship and keeps only beleś/BELEX. Some elements are common in one language but rare in the other, some appear in the wrong position, and some that lack a Basque match may simply be Iberian names borrowed by Aquitanian speakers.

=== Criticism ===
According to Mikel Martínez Areta, the Iberian inscriptions potentially linked to Basque are extremely limited and questionable. Some of the similarities might be explained by borrowings or areal influence. Moreover, it is unclear whether Iberian was a unified language across the entire eastern Iberian Peninsula or restricted to a limited area (perhaps that of the Contestani). In regions closer to the Basque-speaking area, Iberian inscriptions may simply indicate that the language was used as a lingua franca, as proposed by Javier de Hoz.

In place names, the most-cited argument has been the Iberian series in ili- (as in Iliberris), which recurs in Basque and Aquitanian lands (Elimberris, Auch) and was equated with Basque iri ('city'). The match is not straightforward: in Iberian inscriptions the word appears as iltiŕ, whose dental does not correspond regularly to Basque iri. This led Javier de Hoz to treat il- as only one element of a compound, and the resemblance as a shared cultural word rather than proof of genetic relationship.

== Relationship with other languages ==
Various attempts have been made to tie Basque to other languages or language families, such as Indo-European, Minoan, Pictish, or Caucasian. None of these theories have been able to provide convincing data, and they are rejected by most mainstream linguists.

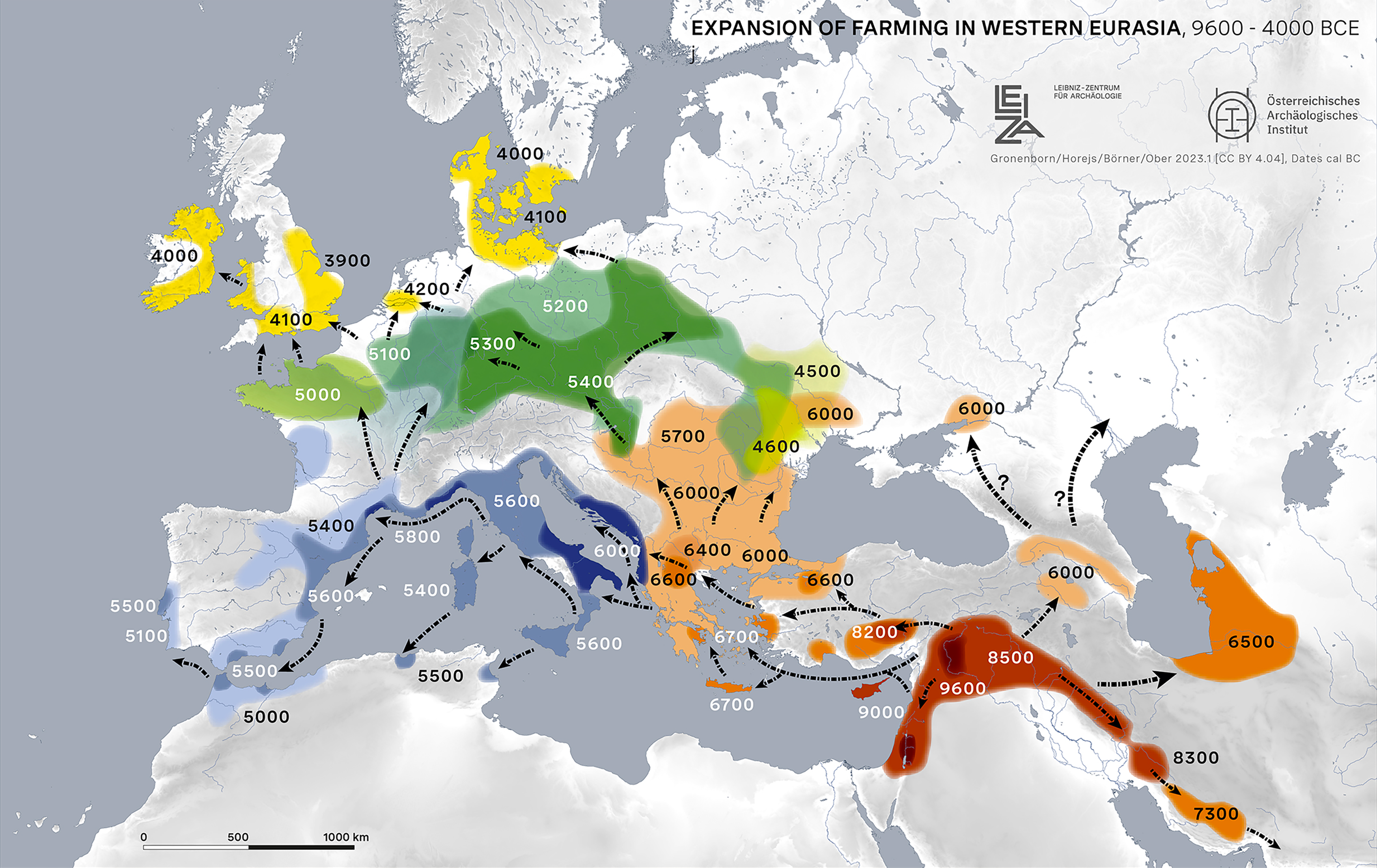
The spread of farming in Europe (6700 –4000 BC) is associated by some scholars to the diffusion of certain Paleo-European languages.

Blasco Ferrer (2016) has interpreted several Sardinian toponyms as aligning with the roots that Joseba Lakarra identifies as 'Pre-Proto-Basque-Aquitanian'. However, critics contend that the meanings attributed to these hypothetical paleo-Sardinian morphemes are based solely on toponymic evidence, and that the time depth separating Basque and paleo-Sardinian would be too great to allow for meaningful comparison. Recent paleogenetic research shows that the spread of agriculture from Anatolia about 10,000 years ago involved significant human genetic replacement. Although it is possible that both Paleo-Sardinian and Basque derive from the languages of these early European farmers, Hualde argues that it is unlikely the ancestral language remained unchanged over such a long period.

Linguist Theo Vennemann (2003) has also proposed a Vasconic substratum hypothesis, suggesting that the ancestors of the Basque language spread across Europe at the end of the Last Glacial Period, when Cro-Magnon populations entered the continent and left traces in modern European languages. However, like other theories linking Basque to languages around the world, this hypothesis is widely rejected by historical linguists.

According to Hualde, standard reconstruction methods allow linguists to trace pre-Proto-Basque-Aquitanian only a short distance back in time. Without significant new evidence, it is unlikely that scholars will ever be able to convincingly demonstrate a close genetic relationship between Basque-Aquitanian and any other language.

== See also ==
- Paleohispanic languages
- Paleohispanic scripts
- Prehistoric Iberia
- Pre-Roman peoples of the Iberian Peninsula
- Proto-language
- Vasconic substrate hypothesis
