= Proto-Basque language =

Reconstructed predecessor of Basque

Proto-Basque
- Reconstruction of: Basque dialects
- Era: 500 BCE – 100 CE

Proto-Basque (Basque: aitzineuskara; Spanish: protoeuskera, protovasco; French: proto-basque) (Note: Also called Pre-Basque by Trask (1997), p. 125) is a reconstructed ancient stage of the Basque language. It preceded another reconstructed stage, Common Basque, which is derived by comparing dialects of modern Basque. Common Basque is their reconstructed common ancestor. Proto-Basque is based on the comparison also of words that precede Common Basque, such as Latin words in Basque, and toponyms. Common Basque is dated to the 5th and 6th centuries, while Proto-Basque stage can be roughly dated to the last centuries BCE, before the Roman conquests in the Western Pyrenees.

The foundation for the study of both stages was laid out by the Basque linguist Koldo Mitxelena. (Note: Known in Spanish as Luis Michelena, which is the name that predominates in linguistic writing by him and other linguists. He did his development during the mid-20th century.) The topic was launched by him in the first edition of Fonética histórica vasca in 1961.

== Background ==
The first linguist who scientifically approached the question of the historical changes that Basque had undergone over the centuries was Koldo Mitxelena. His work on Proto-Basque focused mainly on between the 5th century BCE and the 1st century CE, just before and after initial contact with the Romans. By comparing variants of the same word in modern dialects and the changes that Latin loanwords had undergone, he deduced the ancestral forms and the rules for historical sound changes. His groundbreaking work, which culminated with the publication of his book Fonética histórica vasca (1961) (a revised version of his doctoral thesis of 1959), was carried out mostly before the Aquitanian inscriptions were found, but they fully backed up Mitxelena's proposed Proto-Basque forms.

Since then, a number of other prominent linguists, such as Larry Trask, Alfonso Irigoien, Henri Gavel and most recently Joseba Lakarra, Joaquín Gorrotxategi and Ricardo Gómez, have made further contributions to the field. Some of them, such as Lakarra, have focused their attention on even older layers of the language, called Pre-Proto-Basque (or Old Proto-Basque), that preceded the Celtic invasion of Iberia.

== Direct attestations of Proto-Basque ==
Onomastic attestations of the Aquitanian language, which is only known from the names of places, persons and deities in inscriptions from the first centuries CE, closely match the reconstructed form of Proto-Basque. For instance, Aquitanian names contain elements such as Seni- or Sembe- that fully correspond to the reconstructed Proto-Basque words *seni 'boy' and *sembe 'son'.

A small sample of what is thought to be a form of Proto-Basque has been discovered on the Hand of Irulegi, an inscribed bronze artifact in the shape of a right hand dated to the 1st century BC.

== Reconstruction ==
=== Phonology ===
The consonant system of Proto-Basque was reconstructed by Mitxelena as follows: (Note: The notation of reconstructed sounds in the table follows Lakarra (2017). Mitxelena uses small ⟨p, t, k⟩ for the lenis consonants and capital letters for the fortes, while Trask does not capitalize the fortes but uses ⟨b, d, g⟩ for the lenes.)

Consonants
	Stops			Sibilants		Sonorants			Fricative
	Labial	Dental	Velar	Apical	Laminal	Nasal	Lateral	Rhotic	Laryngeal
fortis	–	T	K	TS	TZ	N	L	R	h
lenis	b	d	g	s	z	n	l	r	h

The characteristic fortis–lenis contrast was realized in three ways:

- Duration: fortis consonants were pronounced longer than their lenis counterparts; for sonorants, this was the main contrast, rhotics were additionally distinguished as trill ⟨R⟩ vs. tap ⟨r⟩ as in Modern Basque
- Occlusion: fortis stops and sibilants were fully occlusive, their lenis counterparts only partially so; fortis sibilants thus were affricates, lenis sibilants were fricatives
- Voicing: lenis stops were generally voiced, while fortis stops were always unvoiced.

This consonant system differed in many ways from the consonant system in Modern Basque dialects: most notable is the lack of /m/, /p/, the semivowels /w/ and /j/, and the entire palatal consonant series in Proto-Basque, and on the other hand the distinction between fortis and lenis nasals and laterals which is not found in the modern language.

This relatively small consonant system was further subject to positional restrictions: only the lenes ⟨b, g, z, s, n, l⟩ occurred at the beginning of a word (also ⟨d⟩, but only in auxiliary verbs), while only fortes were allowed in final position. The fortis–lenis contrast was therefore restricted to word-internal position.

Evidence for the Proto-Basque consonant system comes from sound correspondences between modern dialects, the distribution of sounds in native (i.e. non-borrowed) vocabulary, and from the phonological adaptation of early Latin/Romance borrowings. E.g., the positional restrictions of Proto-Basque explain why the Common Romance affricate in /tselu/ 'sky' (< Classical Latin caelum) became a fricative in Basque (zeru) at the beginning of a word, whereas the simple fricative at the end of the Latin word corpus 'body' was adopted as an affricate in Basque (gorputz). Further, the voicing contrast of stops in Latin/Romance borrowings was only preserved in medial position (e.g. lacum > laku 'lake' versus regem > errege 'king'), but not in word-initial position due to the lack of the fortis-lenis contrast in this position; thus for instance, both p- and b- became b- in Basque: benedica- > beindika 'bless', pacem > bake 'peace'.

Studying the behaviour of Latin and early Romance loanwords in Basque, Mitxelena discovered that Proto-Basque *n was lost between vowels and that Proto-Basque had no *m. Both are relatively unusual cross-linguistically, but /n/ was also partially deleted between vowels during the history of the nearby Gascon and Galician-Portuguese.

Proto-Basque	Modern Basque	English
*ardano	ardo	wine
*(h)ur	ur	water
*arrani	arrain	fish
*bene	mehe	thin, slim
*bini	mihi	tongue
*egu-gaitz	ekaitz	storm
*eLana ~ *eNala	elai ~ enara	barn swallow
*gaztana	gazta	cheese
*ini	ihi	rush (plant)
*organa	orga	cart
*sen-be	seme	son
*seni	sehi	servant
*suni	suhi	son-in-law
*un-be	ume	young, baby
*zani	zain	guard
*zini	zii, zi	acorn

=== Old Proto-Basque ===
One of the puzzles of Basque is the large number of words that begin with vowels in which the initial and second vowels are the same. Joseba Lakarra proposes that in Pre-Proto-Basque there was extensive reduplication and that later, certain initial consonants were deleted, leaving the VCV pattern of Proto-Basque:

Pre-Proto-Basque	Proto-Basque	Modern Basque	English
*dar → *da-dar	*adaR	adar	horn (anatomy)
*dats → *da-dats	*adats	adats	long hair
*der → *de-der	*edeR	eder	beautiful
*dol → *do-dol	*odoL	odol	blood
*gor → *go-gor	*gogoR	gogor	hard
*nal → *na-nal	*anaL	ahal	can, to be able
*nan → *na-nan	*anan-tz	ahantz	to forget
*nin → *ni-nin	*inin-tz	ihintz	dew
*nol → *no-nol	*onoL	ohol	board
*nur → *nu-nur	*unuR	hur	hazelnut
*zal → *za-zal	*azal	azal	bark
*zen → *ze-zen	*zezen	zezen	bull
*ten → *te-ten	*eten	eten	break
*ran → *ra-ran	*aran	aran	plum

== See also ==
- Vasconic languages
- Proto-Basque Swadesh list (Wiktionary)

== Bibliography ==
- Egurtzegi, Ander (2013). "Phonetics and Phonology". In Martinez-Areta, Mikel (ed.). Basque and Proto-Basque Language: Internal and Typological Approaches to Linguistic Reconstruction. Mikroglottika Minority Language Studies Volume 5. Frankfurt am Main: Peter Lang.
- Gorrochategui, Joaquín (2022). "The Relationship between Aquitanian and Basque: Achievements and Challenges of the Comparative Method in a Context of Poor Documentation". In Thiago Costa Chacon (ed.). Language Change and Linguistic Diversity: Studies in Honour of Lyle Campbell. Edinburgh University Press. pp. 105–129. doi:10.1515/9781474488143-010.
- Hualde, José Ignacio (2021). "On the Comparative Method, Internal Reconstruction, and Other Analytical Tools for the Reconstruction of the Evolution of the Basque Language: An Assessment". Anuario del Seminario de Filología Vasca "Julio de Urquijo". 54 (1–2): 19–52. doi:10.1387/asju.23021. hdl:10810/59003.
- Lakarra, Joseba A. (2018). "Basque and the Reconstruction of Isolated Languages". In Lyle Campbell (ed.). Language Isolates. Routledge. pp. 59–99.
- Martinez-Areta, Mikel (2013). "Introduction". In Martinez-Areta, Mikel (ed.). Basque and Proto-Basque Language: Internal and Typological Approaches to Linguistic Reconstruction. Mikroglottika Minority Language Studies Volume 5. Frankfurt am Main: Peter Lang.
- Michelina, Luis (1990). Fonética histórica vasca. Obras completas de Luis Michelena I (in Spanish) (secunda, electronica de la ed. impresa ed.). Donostia San Sebastian: Diputacion Foral de Gipuzkoa. ISBN 978-84-7907-016-8.
- Trask, Larry (1997). The History of Basque. London: Routledge. ISBN 0-415-13116-2.
