= Larrañaga =

Larrañaga (Basque pronunciation: [lara'ɲaɣa]) may refer to:

== Places ==
- Larrañaga, Uruguay, a barrio of Montevideo, Uruguay.

== People ==
- Ainhoa Larrañaga (born 2000), Spanish actress and singer
- Carlos Larrañaga (1937–2012), Spanish actor
- Cristóval María Larrañaga (1758–1851), one of the first trained physicians in New Mexico
- Dámaso Antonio Larrañaga (1771–1848), Uruguayan priest, naturalist and botanist
- Francisco Larrañaga (born 1913, date of death unknown), Basque pelota player
- Gorka González Larrañaga (born 1977), Spanish professional road bicycle racer.
- Isabel Larrañaga Ramírez (1836–1899), Venerable in the Roman Catholic Church
- Jay Larranaga, (born 1975), Irish-American professional basketball player
- Jesús Larrañaga (1901–1942), Basque communist union leader
- Jim Larrañaga (born 1949), American college basketball coach
- Jorge Larrañaga (1956–2021), Uruguayan politician.
- Jorge Larrañaga Vidal (born 1989), Uruguayan politician.
- José de Larrañaga (1728–1806), Franciscan friar, organist, composer
- Juan Antonio Larrañaga (born 1958), Spanish footballer
- Larry Larrañaga, (1937–2018), American civil engineer and politician

== Other ==
- Por Larrañaga, the name of two cigar brands

== See also ==
- Larrinaga, a surname
