= Bronze of Ascoli =

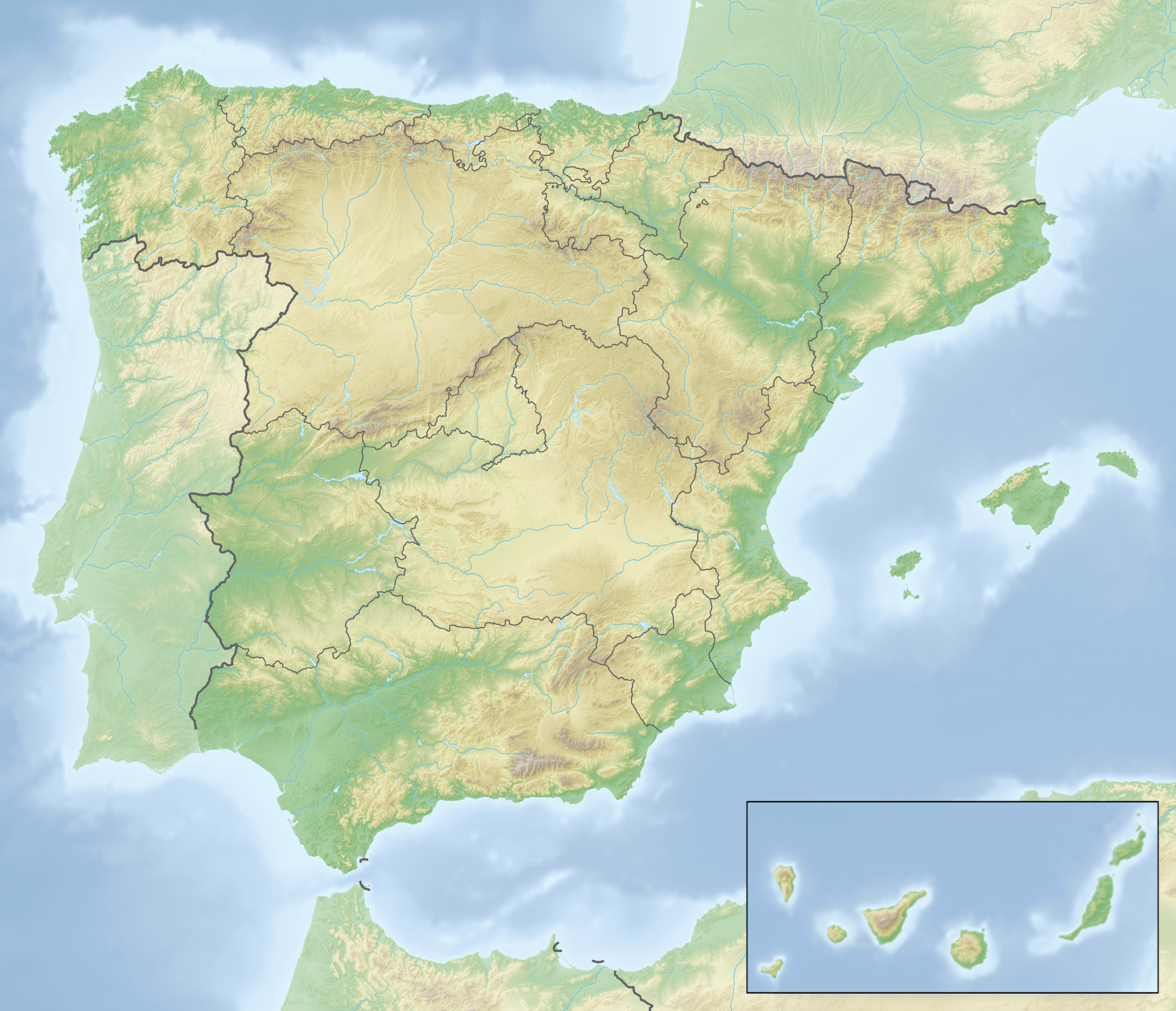
Origins of the Iberian horsemen mentioned in the bronze of Ascoli

The Bronze of Ascoli was a bronze tablet discovered in Asculum (Ascoli), Rome in 1908, which became notable for the study of the ancient Iberian language, because it contained the names of Iberian horsemen of the Turma Salluitana, who received Roman citizenship in 89 BCE after their participation in the siege of Asculum (modern Ascoli Piceno).

This inscription was a key document to understand the concept of bi-member names that Iberians used.

== Characteristics ==
The plaque primarily details the rewards provided by Gnaeus Pompeius Strabo to the Turma Salluitana for their role in capturing Ascoli during the Social War or the War of the Allies (around 90 BC).

While it was originally believed that all the names appearing on this bronze were Iberian, various studies have suggested the hypothesis that some of the names have Vasconic-Aquitanian onomastic origins, such as ENNEGES or ARRANES ARBISCAR F.

It is worth noting that the auxiliary riders who participated in this battle came from Hispania, specifically from the middle Ebro valley.

Another aspect to consider is that the parents of these riders still had foreign names, while some of them had Latinized names. This reflects the progress of the Romanization of the empire.

== Structure ==
The tablet is divided into four sections:

Heading

This section is composed of the first three lines, detailing the rewards that were given to the cavalry squadron, emphasizing the grant of Roman citizenship. These lines indicate the granting of citizenship by Pompey Strabo to the Hispanic riders, by virtue of the LEX IULIA de CIVITATE LATINIS ET SOCIIS DANDA, in the camp located in front of the city of Ascoli, on December 17.

Central Section

This section lists the members of the concilium (campaign council composed of legates, military tribunes, and the Roman social elite). The names of the Roman officials included the nomen, praenomen, filiation, and tribe. Among these names were Pompey Magnus and Lucius Sergius Catilina.

Lower Section

This section specifies who is granted Roman citizenship, presenting a list of their Iberian riders from present-day Zaragoza, Lérida, Ejea de los Caballeros, and other cities.

Bottom Right Section

In this final section, there is a reference to the first block, with additional rewards offered to the riders being added.

== Turma Salluitana ==
There are various hypotheses regarding its name as TVRMA SALLVITANA (Salduie, an Iberian city upon which Caesar Augusta, modern-day Zaragoza, was later founded). The origin of its components varies:

1. Clientelar Thesis: It was believed that the officer in charge of the troops named the squadron. This hypothesis was discarded.
2. Majority Thesis: This was based on the origin of the riders (Salduie). This thesis does not hold up since only four of the riders came from the said region.
3. Political and Administrative Capitality Thesis for Salduie: The drawback is that it anticipates what would years later be known as Caesar Augusta.
4. Practical Recruitment Center Thesis: This is based on the idea that due to the speed of recruitment, Salduie would be a strategic point because of its central location and easy access to the Ebro river.

== Content ==
The part that includes the horsemen names goes as follows:

| TVRMA SALLVITANA | | AGIRNES BENNABELS F. NALBEADEN AGERDO F. ARRANES ARBISCAR F. VMARGIBAS LVSPANGVB(as) F. ENNEGENSIS; BELES VMARBELES F. TVRINNVS ADIMELS F. ORDVMELES BVRDO F. LIBENSES; BASTUGITAS ADIMELS F. VMARILLVN TARBANTV F. SVCONSENSES; BELENNES ALBENNES F. ATVLLO TAVTINDALS F. ILLVERSENSIS; BALCIADIN BALCIBIL(os) F. |
| SANIBELSER ADINGIBAS F. ILURTIBAS BILVSTIBAS F. ESTOPELES ORDENNAS F. TORSINNO AVSTINCO F. BAGARENSIS; CACVSVSIN CHADAR F. ////CENSES //////SOSIMILVS F. /////IRSECEL F. /////GAVN F. //////NESPAISER F. | ILERDENSES; Q. OTACILIVS SUISETARTEN F. CN. CORNELIUS NESILLE F. P. FABIVS ENASAGIN F. BEGENSIS; TVRTVMELIS ATANSCER F. SEGIENSIS; SOSINADEM SOSINASAE F. SOSIMILVS SOSINASAE F. VRGIDAR LVSPANAR F. GVRTARNO BIVRNO F. ELANDVS ENNEGES F. | AGIRNES BENNABELS F. NALBEADEN AGERDO F. ARRANES ARBISCAR F. VMARGIBAS LVSPANGVB(as) F. ENNEGENSIS; BELES VMARBELES F. TVRINNVS ADIMELS F. ORDVMELES BVRDO F. LIBENSES; BASTUGITAS ADIMELS F. VMARILLVN TARBANTV F. SVCONSENSES; BELENNES ALBENNES F. ATVLLO TAVTINDALS F. ILLVERSENSIS; BALCIADIN BALCIBIL(os) F. |

== Bibliography ==
- Silgo Gauche, Luis (2009). La antroponimia ibérica de la Turma Salluitana. Revista Portuguesa de Arqueologia. pp. 139–155.
- Fernández Palacios, Fernando (2010). CASOS Y COSAS PENINSULARES RELACIONADAS CON LA DENOMINADA ONOMÁSTICA "VASCO-AQUITANA" (PDF). Serta Palaeohispanica J. de Hoz Palaeohispanica. pp. 363–378.
- Amela Valverde, Luis (February 2010). El desarrollo de la clientela pompeyana en Hispania. University of Barcelona.
