= Aquitanian =

Aquitanian may refer to:

- Aquitanian (stage), a geological age, the first stage of the Miocene Epoch
- Aquitanian language, an ancient language spoken in the region later known as Gascony
- Aquitani (or Aquitanians), were a people living in what is now Nouvelle-Aquitaine and southwestern Midi-Pyrenees, France
- Anything originating from Aquitaine, a region of France
