= Mutilva Alta =

Coordinates: 42°48′N 1°37′W

Mutilva Alta (in Spanish) or Mutiloagoiti (in Basque) is a town south of Pamplona in Navarre, Spain. It belongs to the municipality of Aranguren.

== See also ==
- Sadar (river)
