= Aquitanian language =

Language of the ancient Aquitani people

Aquitanian
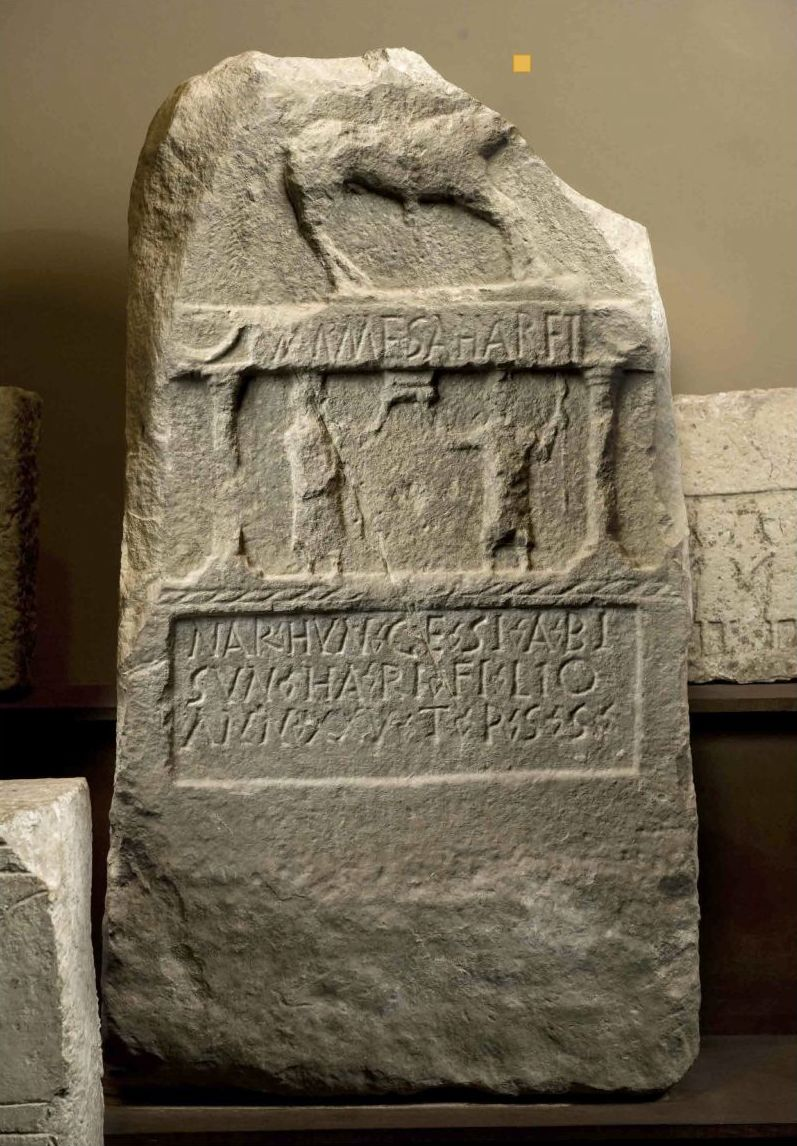
- The Lerga stela (Navarre), bearing the name Ummesahar, read from Basque ume ('child') and zahar ('old')
- Native to: France, Spain
- Region: Western/Central Pyrenees, Gascony
- Extinct: by the Early Middle Ages
- Language family: Vasconic (related to Basque): Aquitanian
- Writing system: Iberian, Latin

Language codes
- ISO 639-3: xaq
- Glottolog: None

The Aquitanian language, also Vasco-Aquitanian or Eusko-Aquitanian, was the language of the ancient Vasco-Aquitanian peoples, namely the Aquitani and Vascones. In Roman times, the Aquitani lived north of the Pyrenees, between the Garonne river and the Atlantic Ocean, while the Vascones lived south of the Pyrenees, between the Cantabrian coast and the Ebro, in the area of present-day Navarre. Aquitanian is related to Basque, both being classified as Vasconic languages.

The term Aquitanian derives from Aquitania, the name given by Caesar to the lands inhabited by the Aquitani. Modern scholarship applies it in two senses. In a narrow sense it denotes only the language spoken by the Aquitani north of the Pyrenees. In a broad sense it covers the whole set of related varieties on both slopes of the range, for which Joaquín Gorrochategui distinguishes Aquitanian proper in the north from Vasconic, the language of the Vascones, in the south.

Beside a possible short inscription on the Hand of Irulegi, discovered in 2021, there is no surviving text written in Aquitanian. The only evidence comes from onomastic data (roughly 200 personal names and about 60 deity names) that have survived indirectly in Latin inscriptions from the Roman imperial period, primarily between the 1st and 3rd centuries AD, with a few possibly dating to the 4th or 5th centuries.

== Attestation ==
The presence of a distinct language in Aquitania is recorded by Caesar and Strabo. At the opening of the Gallic War, Caesar states that the Aquitani differed from the Gauls and the Belgae in language, institutions and laws. Strabo adds that they resembled the Iberians rather than the Gauls, in language as well as in physical type.

The language has left no continuous text. Its record consists entirely of personal and divine names carried by Latin inscriptions of the early imperial period, between the 1st and 3rd centuries AD. The only indigenous inscription found within Aquitania, a fragmentary silver phiale from a princely tomb at Vieille-Aubagnan (Landes), a luxury import from the Hispanic Levant, is written in Iberian rather than Aquitanian.

Since the evidence is mostly onomastic, it makes some elements attributed to Aquitanian sometimes difficult to classify. A name reflects the sounds and the word-formation of its language, but it carries no meaning of its own, so the same form can belong to more than one language. On these grounds several Aquitanian names have also been read as Gaulish: Senicco linked to seno- ('old'), Oxson to Celtic ukso(n) ('ox'), and Andoxsus to Indo-European *n̥do-sth₂-o- ('the one below'). Joaquín Gorrochategui prefers a Basque explanation for such cases, based on how the names are distributed and how they are built.

The Hand of Irulegi, discovered in 2021 and dated to the 1st century BC, bears a short inscription that may be written in Vasconic, a dialect of Aquitanian. It reads sorioneku ⋅ kunekebeekiŕateŕe/ /n oTiŕtan ⋅ eseakaŕi eŕaukon. (Note: The first word, sorioneku (or sorioneke), admits comparison with Basque zori (h)on ('good fortune'). Other elements, such as the verbal form eŕaukon and a place-name with a locative in -n, likewise point to a Vasconic language, in which case it would be the longest and earliest text yet known in this language.)

According to Jacques Allières, the Gascon language also has a substrate from Aquitanian, with certain words related to Basque.

== Classification ==
=== History of research ===
The Aquitanian names were first studied by the archivist Achille Luchaire in the 1870s. He collected the personal and divine names from the Latin inscriptions and linked them to names in medieval Basque documents. Gascon is spoken over the same ground as ancient Aquitania, and Luchaire took the features it shares with Basque as the trace of a substrate. Luis Michelena gave the material a linguistic account in 1954. He analysed the elements of the names, their formation and their phonology in relation to Basque. Joaquín Gorrochategui then gathered the corpus in full in his Onomástica indígena de Aquitania (1984). The silver votive plaques of the Hagenbach hoard, published in 1990, added further Aquitanian material.

=== Internal classication ===
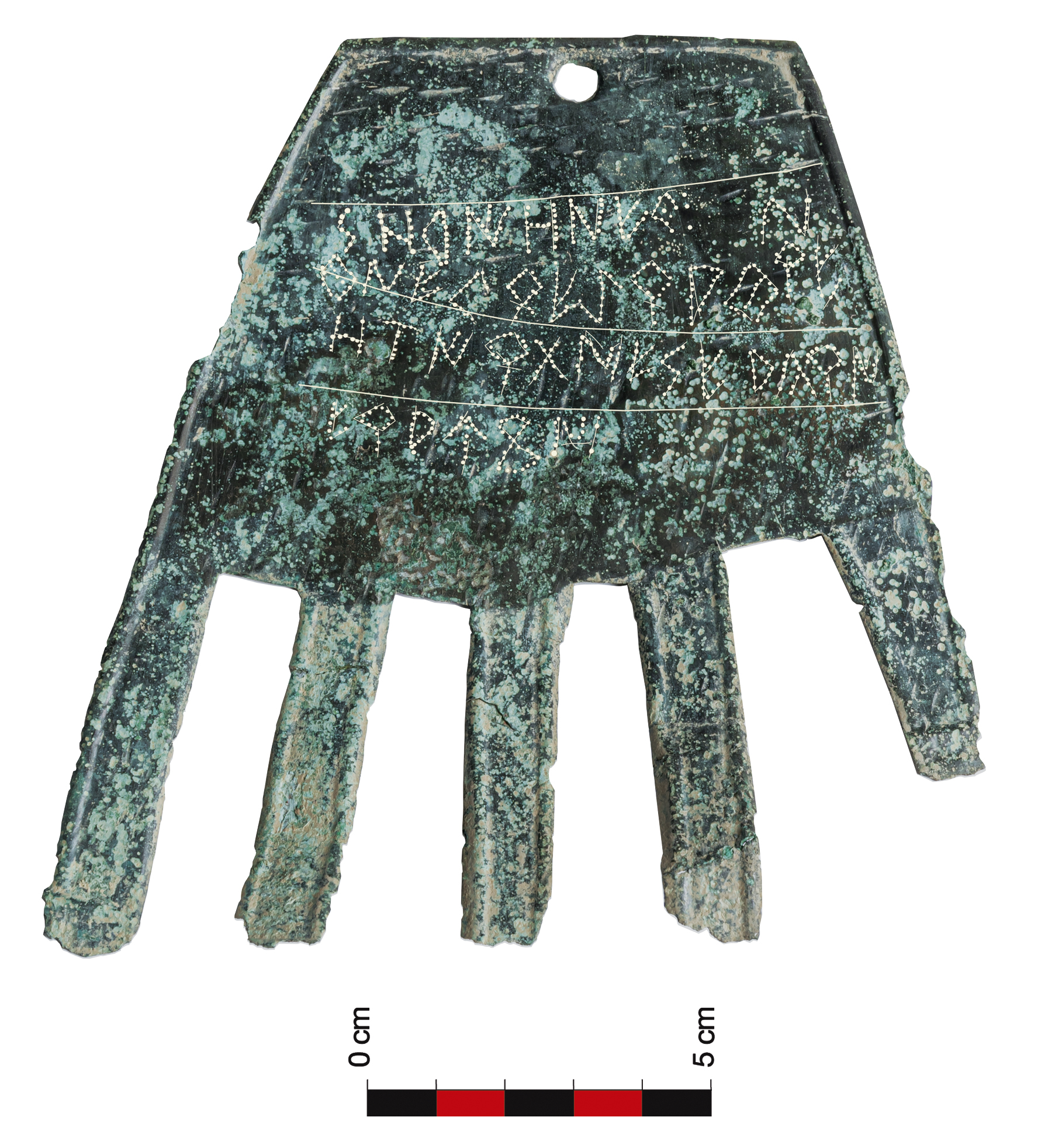
Hand of Irulegi (1st century BC), from the territory of the Vascones, possibly bearing an Aquitanian text.

According to linguist José Ignacio Hualde, since Aquitanian was spoken over a vast area (some names of Aquitanian origin have been found as far south as Soria in Castile), it likely featured several dialects. Javier de Hoz likewise argues that the native inscriptions from Aquitania and Navarre may underlie a set of related dialects, or possibly a small language family.

Joaquín Gorrochategui distinguishes two regional varieties: Aquitanian proper, the language of the Aquitani (north of the Pyrenees in Aquitania), and Vasconic, the language of the Vascones (in Navarre and its surroundings). Ancient Vasconic and Aquitanian share a number of linguistic features, such as the alternation of the suffixes -so and -se in masculine and feminine personal names. Names such as Nar(h)un- and -har have exact Aquitanian counterparts (Narhon-sus and -thar). Two features mark this material as Vasconic and Aquitanian rather than Iberian: an aspiration written H in every position, and the rendering of a final sibilant -s as an affricate -ts, as seen in Or[du]netsi. However, they also differ in their onomastic bases, their preference for derivation or compounding, and the presence or absence of certain sound changes.

=== Relationship to Basque ===
The consensus among scholars is that Aquitanian was a Paleo-European language genetically related to Basque, though there is debate over the exact nature of their relationship. Some linguists, like R. L. Trask, argue that it was a near-direct ancestor of Basque, while others, including Lyle Campbell, suggest that it may have been a close relative of Basque rather than its direct ancestor.

Aquitanian is attested only in the form of proper names, and linguists lack enough data to determine their exact meanings. For instance, the Aquitanian words andere, umme, and sahar are interpreted as 'woman, lady', 'child', and 'old', respectively, by comparison with the Basque words andere, ume, and zahar.

Hualde suggests that Basque may have evolved from one of the Aquitanian dialects, though it remains unclear which names belong to Basque's direct ancestor and which come from a related sister dialect. He refers to the reconstructed common ancestor of Proto-Basque and the other Aquitanian dialects as 'Proto-Basque-Aquitanian'.

== Geographical extent ==
Geographical extent of the Vasco-Aquitanian dialects in Roman times. Blue dots: place names; red dots: epigraphic traces; blue patch: maximum territorial extension.

Drawing on linguistic evidence, Joaquín Gorrochategui concludes that the Aquitanian language was spoken in ancient times (from at least the 1st century BC until the end of the Roman Empire) across a region stretching from Biscay in the west to the Aran Valley in the east, and from the Aquitanian Plain in the north down to the Ebro river in the south. Some Vasconic elements also reach areas south of the Ebro, beyond the core area of its speakers.

The Aquitanian language came into contact with Gaulish around Tolosa (Toulouse) and the Garonne river, and with Celtiberian further west and around the Ebro river. Both of these languages penetrated Aquitanian-speaking territory, leaving evidence in personal names and place names. At Estella the personal names are Celtiberian while the divine names are Vasconic, which Gorrochategui and Vallejo explain by a Vasconic population adopting Celtiberian naming customs. South of the Ebro, in the Tierras Altas of Soria, names such as Sesenco (from the suffix -co and Basque zezen 'bull') mark Vasconic speakers in the civitas of Calagurris, a city whose name is itself Vasconic though its coins carry the Celtiberian legend kalakorikos.

== Phonology ==
The sound system of Aquitanian is known only from the names. It rested on an opposition between fortis (tense) and lenis (lax) consonants. The fortis consonants were usually written with the Latin voiceless letters, sometimes with an added aspiration. The lenis consonants were written with the voiced letters. In the sonorants, and especially the nasal, spelling marked the opposition with a double NN for the tense sound and a single N for the lax one. Among the sibilants, X or XS noted the strong variant and S the lenis fricative. The strong variant was probably an affricate. The language had no fricatives /f/, /θ/ or /x/. Its only fully functional labial was /b/. The other labials, /p/ and /m/, were marginal. Joaquín Gorrochategui notes that this system is identical, or very close, to the Proto-Basque reconstructed from the historical Basque dialects.

Three traits set Aquitanian apart from the neighbouring Gaulish, Celtiberian and Iberian, and tie it to Basque. The first is a wide use of H, taken to stand for an aspiration. It appears in every position, and is especially frequent at the start of words and between vowels. The second is the rarity of /m/. It is common in Gaulish names, but in Aquitanian it is almost confined to the cluster -mb-. There it is an allophone of /n/ before a labial. The third is the absence of word-initial /r/. Of about 600 indigenous names recorded in Aquitania, only one begins with R-, and that one is Gaulish. Iberian and Basque share this restriction, and Basque keeps it to the present. Latin rota(m) gives Basque errota 'mill', and rege(m) gives errege 'king'.

The names also show that Aquitanian preserved phonological states older than those of historical Basque. The element Seni- ('boy') still has the single intervocalic nasal. Basque later lost it, giving sehi, sein. The same loss appears in Latin loanwords, where anate gave Basque ahate ('duck'). Historical Basque also came to restrict where the aspiration could fall, but no such restriction applied yet in Aquitanian. The Hagenbach plaques carry an initial X in Xembus, a variant of Sembus with a palatal pronunciation. This shows that expressive palatalisation was already present in ancient Basque, and points to similarity between Aquitanian and later Basque.

== Lexicon ==
The Aquitanian name-stock is rich in derived forms and poor in compounds, which are almost confined to the divine names. Words are formed by suffixation alone, and the prefixes common in Gaulish (uer-, com-, ad-, an-, at(e)-, eni-, ro-) do not occur.

Most Aquitanian onomastic elements are clearly identifiable from a Basque perspective, matching closely the forms reconstructed by the linguist Luis Michelena for Proto-Basque.

Aquitanian	Proto-Basque	Basque	Basque meaning
adin	*adiN	adin	age, judgment
andere, er(h)e	*andere	andre	lady, woman
andos(s), andox	*andoś		lord
arix	*aris	aritz	oak
artahe, artehe	*artehe	arte	holm oak
atta	*aTa	aita	father
belex	*beLats	belatz	falcon
bels	*bels	beltz	black
bihox, bihos	*bihos	bihotz	heart
bon, -pon	*boN	on	good
bors	*bors	bost	five
cis(s)on, gison	*gisoN	gizon	man
-c(c)o	*-Ko	-ko	diminutive suffix
corri, gorri	*goRi	gorri	red
hals-	*hals	haltza	alder
han(n)a	?*aNane	anaia	brother
har-, -ar	*aR	ar	male
hars-	*hars	hartz	bear
heraus-	*herauś	herauts	boar
il(l)un, ilur	*iLun	il(h)un	dark
leher	*leheR	leher	pine
nescato	*neśka	neska, neskato	girl, young woman
ombe, umme	*unbe	ume	child
oxson, osson	*otso	otso	wolf
sahar	*sahaR	zahar	old
sembe	*senbe	seme	son
seni	*śeni	sehi, sein	boy
-ten	*-teN	-ten	diminutive suffix (fossilized)
-t(t)o	*-To	-t(t)o	diminutive suffix
-x(s)o	*-tso	-txo, -txu	diminutive suffix

== See also ==
- Gallia Aquitania
- Basque language
- Vasconic languages
- Pre-Roman peoples of the Iberian Peninsula
