= Cristóval María Larrañaga =

Physician in new Mexico(1758–1851)

- Born: 1758, in Mexico City
- Died: January 6, 1851
- Spouse: María Gertrudiz Mestas

Cristóval María Larrañaga (1758–1851) was one of the first trained medical doctors in New Mexico. He served in the Spanish military and engineered a successful vaccination program against smallpox in 1804 and 1805.

== Biography ==
Born in Mexico City, Larrañaga, a criollo, immigrated through to Northern New Mexico. He married María Gertrudiz Mestas and had seven sons and two daughters.

In 1804, Larrañaga received a shipment of cowpox scabs from Mexico City and travelled north to Chihuahua City with children to pass the smallpox vaccine from person to person. He continued his travels up north along the Camino Real to Taos. His logs show he vaccinated 3,610 people. Larrañaga is credited with saving a generation. The children who traveled from Ciudad Chihuahua to Santa Fé with Larrañaga were children of soldiers, and were also labeled as heroes. New Mexico had been struggling against smallpox since the early 1780s; a 1781 outbreak had killed 5,000 people, which is thought to have been more than a quarter of the population in New Mexico.

In Origins of New Mexico Families, Fray Angélico Chávez states extant orders given to Larrañaga to vaccinate the area until 1809. He also cites Larrañaga as a notary for the state. In 1809, Larrañaga was vaccinating again after running out of antigen. In 1810, he is recorded as vaccinating 124 children up to age six.

By the end of that year, he exhausted himself by providing serum to so many. In Saints & Seasons: A Guide to New Mexico's Most Popular Saints, the authors state that "[i]n the annals of New Mexico medicine, Cristóval Larrañaga is both a pioneer and a hero."

Historian Marc Simmons states that "Dr. Larrañaga deserves a biographer". He practiced in New Mexico from 1775 to 1811.

Larrañaga was the only accredited and trained physician in the territory. The pioneer was responsible for caring for more than forty thousand people. In Tocante a monumentos de españoles, author Jerry Padilla says that Larrañaga should be honored for his efforts of vaccinating so many.

On page 106 of Land Claims in New Mexico, Congressional Edition, Volume 967, Larrañaga signs as secretary of the Corporation (Capital) of Santa Fé. This was a promotion due to the notaries he facilitated. Larrañaga is mentioned as deserving a promotion due to his extensive knowledge of medicine.

David H. Salazar provided the first genealogical research on the Larrañaga family.

Descendants of Larrañaga served as doctors, in the military, and as notaries. Larry Larrañaga, a New Mexico State Representative, is a descendant of Cristóval María Larrañaga.

Larrañaga's work with the smallpox vaccine in New Mexico was the basis for a children's book, Amadito and the Hero Children.
