= Aranguren =

- Municipality
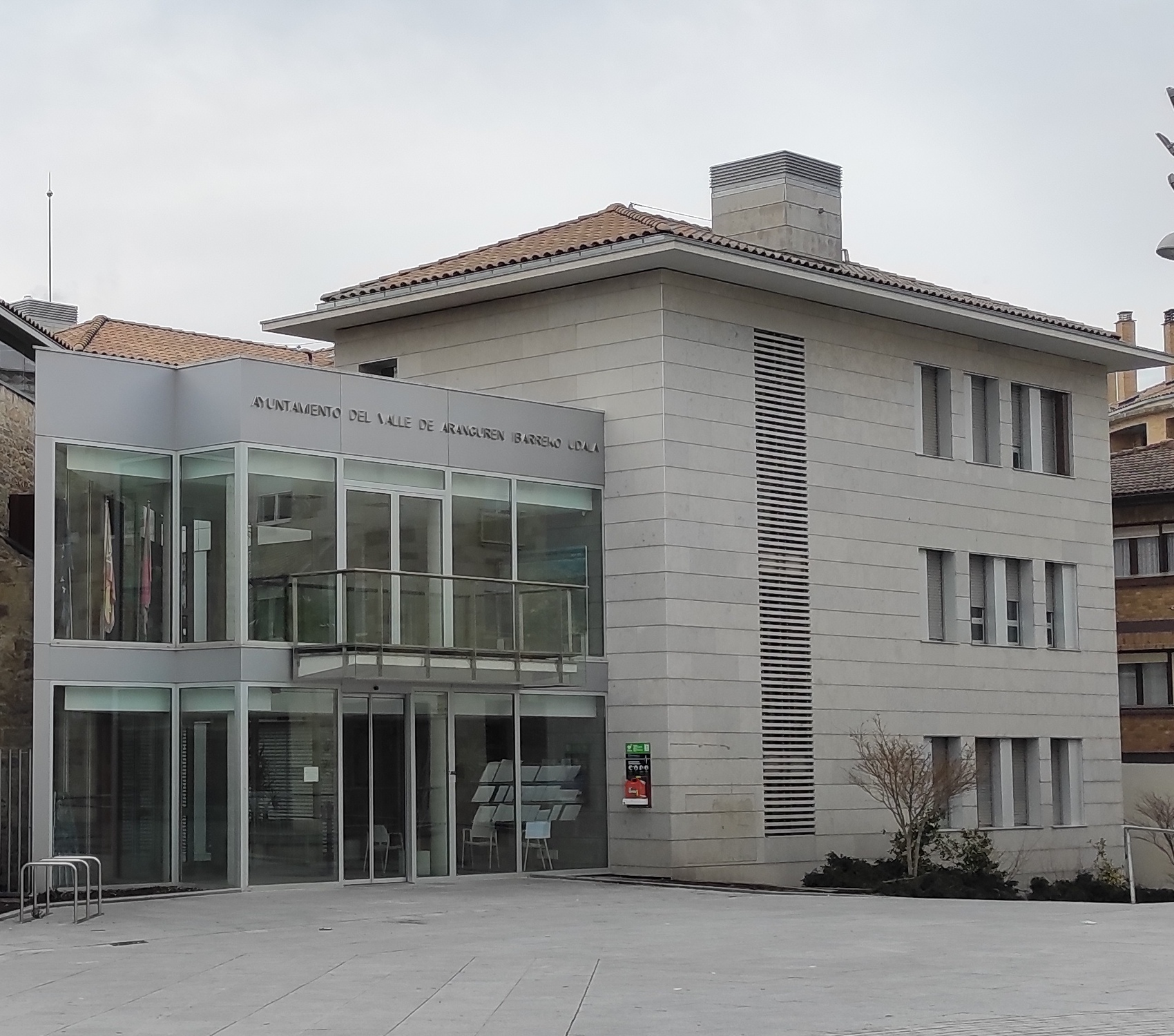
- Town hall

- Coat of arms

- Location in Spain
- Coordinates: 42°47′21″N 1°32′10″W
- Country: Spain
- Autonomous community: Navarre
- Province: Navarre
- Comarca / Eskualdea: Cuenca de Pamplona
- Judicial district: Agoitz

Government
  - Mayor: Manuel Romero Pardo

Area
  - Total: 40.60 km^{2} (15.68 sq mi)
- Elevation: 442 m (1,450 ft)

Population (2025-01-01)
  - Total: 13,216
  - Density: 325.5/km^{2} (843.1/sq mi)
- Demonym: Arangureneses or Arangurendarres
- Time zone: UTC+1 (CET)
  - Summer (DST): UTC+2 (CEST)
- Postal code: 31192
- Dialing code: 948
- Website: Official website

Aranguren is a town and municipality located in the province and autonomous community of Navarre, northern Spain.

== See also ==
- Hand of Irulegi
- Mutilva Alta
