= Marc Simmons =

American historian (1937–2023)

His Most Illustrious Lord Marc Simmons CYC
- Born: May 15, 1937; Dallas, Texas, United States
- Died: September 14, 2023 (aged 86); Albuquerque, New Mexico, United States
- Education: University of Texas, Austin (BA)
- Occupation: Historian
- Parents: J.M. Simmons (father); Lois Simmons (mother)

Marc Simmons CYC (May 15, 1937 – September 14, 2023) was an American historian who specialized in the history of the U.S. state of New Mexico. As an independent scholar, he was credited by the University of New Mexico Press with publishing at least 42 books and numerous articles on the history of his home state, with particular reference to the heritage of Native American, Spanish Colonial, and Mexican Colonial elements within this overall history.

== Biography ==
Marc Simmons was born in 1937 in Dallas, Texas to J.M. Simmons and Lois Simmons. He completed a four year degree at the University of Texas, Austin for a Bachelor of Arts in Latin American Studies, majoring in Spanish.

Simmons emigrated from Texas to New Mexico at an early age, pursuing a passionate attachment to the Land of Enchantment and its horse culture. He studied history at the University of New Mexico and ranch life from New Mexicans, and reporter Howard Houghton said Simmons “may have been the only working farrier around with a Ph.D.” In 1980, Simmons was awarded a Guggenheim Fellowship in U.S. history. From 2000 until 2016, Simmons wrote a weekly column for the Santa Fe New Mexican. Phyllis Morgan has published a biographical essay and bibliography of Simmons's work.

Simmons had, from 2008, donated his papers to an archive in the Wittliff Collections at Texas State University.

Marc Simmons died in Albuquerque, New Mexico on September 14, 2023, at the age of 86.

== Honours ==
In 1993, Marc Simmons was admitted to the Order of Isabella the Catholic at the rank of commander by King Juan Carlos I of Spain.
