= Larrinaga =

Larrinaga may refer to:

- Enrique Larrinaga Esnal (1910–1993), Spanish football player
- Jon Larrinaga (born 1990), Spanish cyclist
- Joseba Larrinaga (1968–2013), Spanish paralympic athlete
- Tulio Larrínaga (1847–1917), Resident Commissioner of Puerto Rico

de Larrinaga

- Javier Ruiz de Larrinaga (born 1979), Spanish racing cyclist
- Rupert de Larrinaga (born 1928), British skier of Basque descent

See also

- Larrañaga (disambiguation)
