= Larry Larrañaga =

American politician (1937–2018)

Representative Lorenzo Larry Larrañaga

Member of the New Mexico House of Representatives from the 27th district
- In office January 15, 1995 – October 1, 2018

Personal details
- Born: December 31, 1937 near Encino, New Mexico, U.S.
- Died: October 9, 2018 (aged 80) Albuquerque, New Mexico, U.S.
- Party: Republican
- Occupation: Civil Engineer

Lorenzo Archibeque Larrañaga (December 31, 1937 – October 9, 2018) was an American politician who was a Republican member of the New Mexico House of Representatives, representing the 27th District since 1995. He served on the House Agriculture and Water Resources committee, Appropriations and Finance committee and Rules and Order of Business committee.

He attended the University of New Mexico where he attained his masters and bachelor's degrees in engineering and civil engineering. He served in the United States Army. Larrañaga was the retired owner of a ranching company. He also worked as an engineer for the State of New Mexico in the highways department, also serving as Secretary of Highways in 1982. He was Deputy Chief Administrator for the City of Albuquerque from 1987 to 1988.

He lived in Albuquerque and was married with two children. Larrañaga resigned from the House of Representatives and his re-election campaign on October 1, 2018, due to health problems (probable Creutzfeldt-Jakob disease), and died just over a week later on October 9, 2018.

Lorenzo is a descendant of Cristoval Larrañaga, Military Surgeon.

On March 7, 2019, the Legislature of the State of New Mexico, in a unanimous vote, named the 27 mile section of US 285 between Clines Corners and Encino, New Mexico, the "Representative Lorenzo "Larry" Larrañaga Corridor".
