= Antonio Tovar =

Spanish philologist, linguist and historian

The Most Excellent Antonio Tovar
- Born: Antonio Tovar Llorente; 17 May 1911; Valladolid, Spain
- Died: 13 December 1985 (aged 74); Madrid, Spain

Seat J of the Real Academia Española
- In office 31 March 1968 – 13 December 1985
- Preceded by: Luis Ceballos y Fernández de Córdoba
- Succeeded by: Francisco Nieva

Antonio Tovar Llorente (17 May 1911 – 13 December 1985) was a Spanish philologist, linguist and historian.

== Biography ==
Born in Valladolid, the son of a notary, he grew up in Elorrio (Vizcaya), Morella (Castellón) and Villena (Alicante) where as a child he learned to speak Basque and Valencian. He studied law at the Universidad María Cristina de El Escorial, History at the University of Valladolid, and Classical Philology in Madrid, Paris and Berlin. He had as teachers, among others, Cayetano de Mergelina, Manuel Gómez-Moreno, Ramón Menéndez Pidal and Eduard Schwyzer.

He was president of the University Student Federation (FUE) in Valladolid, a republican-leaning organisation, but in September 1936 after beginning the civil war, he adopted a Falangist attitude influenced by his intimate friend Dionisio Ridruejo, and became one of those responsible for the propaganda of the nationalist government in Burgos, though his disillusionment with the Nationalist faction started.

During the Spanish coup of July 1936 he was in Berlin visiting a Hitler Youth camp. He returned to the nationalist zone. During the Spanish Civil War, Ridruejo as National Chief of Propaganda entrusted the radio department to Tovar and he was made responsible for Radio Nacional de España when it was being broadcast from Salamanca (1938). He also worked with the Falangist newspaper Arriba España in Pamplona, edited by Fermín Yzurdiaga.

Following his relationship with Ridruejo and in the orbit of Ramón Serrano Súñer, from December 1940 to April 1941 he occupied the position of Under-Secretary of Press and Propaganda. He accompanied Serrano Súñer on several trips to Germany and Italy and during some of these he was present in some meetings with Mussolini and with Hitler.

Leaving political life, he obtained the Latin lectureship at the University of Salamanca in 1942 and from then on devoted himself to teaching and research. He married Consuelo Larrucea the same year. He was member of the early Francoist legislatures.

In 1947 he started in Salamanca a class on Basque language, embryo for the Manuel de Larramendi chair eventually created in 1953, the first chair of "Basque language and literature" in Spain; its first holder was Koldo Mitxelena.

During the ministry of Ruiz-Giménez (1951–1956), Tovar was appointed rector of the university. As rector, he organized the celebrations of its seventh centenary. This was attended by the rectors of the main universities of the world, who made a memorable parade through the streets of Salamanca with their traditional costumes.

As a result of the centennial celebration of the centennial in 1954, Salamanca restarted awarding doctoral degrees (which the Moyano Law had reserved exclusively to the Central University of Madrid). A large amount of bibliographic materials, which had been taken by French troops leaving Spain in 1813 and kept in the Palais-Royal library, were returned to the university library.

Officially Tovar remained rector of Salamanca until 1963, even though he had previously left Spain.

He was a professor at the University of Buenos Aires (1948–1949) and the National University of Tucumán (1958–1959), where he studied the indigenous languages of northern Argentina and tried to create a school that would continue his work in this field.

At the University of Illinois, he was first named 'Miller Visiting Professor of Classics' (1960–1961), and then 'Professor of Classics' (1963–1967). In 1965 he gained the Latin chair at the University of Madrid, which allowed him to return to Spain. Soon after arriving, there was a student protest, culminating in a demonstration led by Tierno Galván, Aranguren, García Calvo and Montero Díaz. When they were expelled from the university of these (the first three permanently and Montero Diaz temporarily), Tovar resigned in solidarity and returned to the United States until 1967, when he was called to occupy the chair of comparative linguistics in the University of Tübingen (Germany), where he taught until his retirement in 1979. He died in Madrid.

He devoted his studies to classical philology and to a large number of languages, including Basque (a Basque-language etymological dictionary is now being published, in collaboration with Manuel Agud and Koldo Mitxelena), Proto-Indo-European languages, other indigenous languages of the peninsula such as Iberian, and Amerindian languages. (At the University of Salamanca, a chair in Amerindian languages bears his name.) He spoke a dozen languages and knew 150 others.

He was editor of the magazine Emerita (1939-1944), Minos (1951–1968, along with E. Peruzzi and MS Ruipérez ) and Acta Salamantisencia (1944-1951). He wrote literary criticism in the magazine Gaceta Ilustrada.

== Awards ==
- He occupied the "j" chair of the Real Academia Española and was a member of the Euskaltzaindia.
- He was appointed Doctor Honoris Causa by the Universities of Munich (1953), Buenos Aires (1954), Dublin (1979) and Seville (1980).
- In 1981 he was awarded the Goethe Prize for his work supporting freedom of investigation and of professorship.
- In 1982 he was awarded the Cross of San Jorge granted by the Generalitat of Catalonia, and in 1984 he received the Castilla y León Prize for Social Sciences and Communication in his first edition.
- A street in central Salamanca is called "Rector Tovar".

== Selected publications ==
- En el primer giro (estudio sobre la Antigüedad), Madrid, Espasa-Calpe, 1941.
- Vida de Sócrates, Madrid, Revista de Occidente, 1947 (varias reeds.).
- Estudios sobre las primitivas lenguas hispánicas, Buenos Aires, Instituto de Filología, 1949.
- La lengua vasca, San Sebastián, Biblioteca Vascongada de los Amigos del País, 1950.
- Los hechos políticos en Platón y Aristóteles, Buenos Aires, Perrot, 1954.
- Un libro sobre Platón, Madrid, Espasa Calpe, 1956 (reeds.).
- The ancient languages of Spain and Portugal, New York, S.F.Vanni, 1961 (versión en inglés de la de 1949).
- Historia de Grecia (con Martín Sánchez Ruipérez), Barcelona, Montaner y Simón, 1963 (varias reeds.).
- Historia del antiguo Oriente, Barcelona, Montaner y Simón, 1963 (varias reeds.).
- Estudios sobre la España Antigua (con Julio Caro Baroja, Madrid : CSIC-Fundación Pastor, 1971.
- Historia de la Hispania Romana: La Península Ibérica desde 218 a. C. hasta el siglo V (con J. M. Blázquez), Madrid, Alianza, 1975 (varias reeds.).
- Bosquejo de un mapa tipológico de las lenguas de América del Sur, Bogotá, Instituto Caro y Cuervo, 1961.
- Universidad y educación de masas (ensayo sobre el porvenir de España), Barcelona, Ariel, 1968.
- Sprachen und Inschriften. Studien zum Mykenischen, Lateinischen und Hispanokeltischen, Ámsterdam, B.R.Grüner, 1973.
- Iberische Landeskunde. Zweiter Teil. Die Völker und die Städte des antiken Hispanien (continuación del Iberische Landeskunde de Adolf Schulten), 3 vols.: Bética (1974), Lusitania (1976), Tarraconense (1989, póstuma).
- Einführung in die Sprachgeschichte der Iberischen Halbinsel: Das heutige Spanisch und seine historischen Grundlagen, Tübingen, TBL-Verlag Narr, 1977 (varias reeds.).
- Mitología e ideología sobre la lengua vasca: Historia de los estudios sobre ella, Madrid, Alianza, 1980 (reed. 2007).
- Relatos y diálogos de Los Matacos (chaco argentino occidental). Seguidos de una gramática de su lengua, Madrid, Int. Cultura Hispánica, 1981.
- Catálogo de las lenguas de América del Sur: con clasificaciones, indicaciones tipológicas, bibliografía y mapas (con su esposa, Consuelo Larrucea de Tovar), Madrid, Gredos, 1984.
- Diccionario etimológico vasco (con Manuel Agud), Donostia, Gipuzkoako Foru Aldundia, 1991 y 1992.
