= Koldo Mitxelena =

Basque linguist (1915–1987

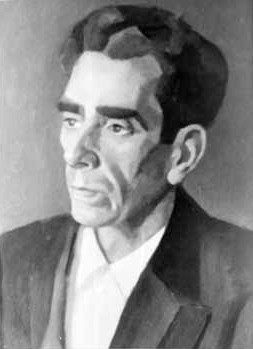
- Portrait of Mitxelena
- Born: Koldo Mitxelena Elissalt; 20 August 1915; Errenteria, Spain
- Died: 11 October 1987 (aged 72); San Sebastián, Spain
- Other name: Luis Michelena
- Occupation: Linguist

Koldo Mitxelena Elissalt (Basque pronunciation: [koldo mitʃelena]; 20 August 1915 – 11 October 1987), also known as Luis Michelena, was an eminent Spanish Basque linguist. He taught in the Department of Philology at the University of the Basque Country, and was a member of the Royal Academy of the Basque Language.

He is described as "the greatest scholar the Basque language has ever seen." He is known for the complete reconstruction of Proto-Basque he undertook in the 1950s, as well as the formal demonstration in 1954 that the Aquitanian language was an ancestral form of Basque. Mitxelena was also one of the main participants in the creation of "Euskara Batua" or Standard Basque. In 1987 he was declared Seme Kuttun of the City of Errenteria, literally 'beloved son'.

== Life ==
=== Childhood and adolescence ===
Mitxelena was born into a family engaged in industrial crafts. When still a child, illness kept him bed-ridden for a long time. This awoke his interest in reading, and also his love for the Basque language.

Mitxelena came from a Basque Nationalist family. When he was young, he was affiliated with the Euskal Langileen Alkartasuna and the Basque Nationalist Party, and learnt about the Euskaltzaleak youth movement led by Jose Ariztimuño, known as "Aitzol." He began working in a factory while continuing his studies, also starting to attend meetings. At this time he became interested in pre-war Basque literature.

=== War, death sentence, prison ===
When the Spanish coup of July 1936 took place, Mitxelena volunteered to join the Euzko Gudarostea, the army of the Basque Government. He was taken captive in Santoña and was condemned to death on September 7, 1937, but the sentence was commuted to 30 years in prison. He thus came to know the prisons of El Dueso, Larrinaga, and Burgos.

In the Burgos prison, he made the acquaintance of many intellectuals and university professors. It was there that Francisco Jordá (later a professor of archaeology) convinced him to undertake university studies. Difficulties prevented him from doing so until 1948. Two books played a large role in motivating him: the Manual de Gramática Española (Manual of Spanish Grammar) by Menéndez Pidal and Aguado Bleye's History of Spain.

He was released on January 13, 1943, after 5 years, 4 months, and 5 days of prison.

=== Second imprisonment ===
Mitxelena returned to Errenteria when he was 27, in ill health. Jose Uranga, an entrepreneur from Errenteria offered him an accounting job in Madrid. He took it immediately, and began engaging in clandestine activities while working. The entire opposition had one hope: that the Allied Forces in World War II would win, and thus cause Francoist Spain to fall.

On April 10, 1946, Mitxelena was again arrested for his activities related to the Confederación Nacional del Trabajo and the Basque Nationalist Party. Together with this, three important Galicians fell: Ramón Piñeiro and the Saco brothers. Mitxelena was sentenced to two years. He was released on January 30, 1948, after passing through a few more prisons: Alcalá, Ocaña, Yeserías, and Talavera.

=== Poverty and intellectual development ===
In 1948, Mitxelena was once again in Errenteria, but he enrolled in the Faculty of Philosophy and Letters in Madrid, having been encouraged by Francisco Jordá, his prison mate. The two decades of the 50s and 60s were important for Mitxelena. He underwent a significant intellectual development, but was living on a shoestring and had to work more than one job to make a living. Due to his criminal record, it was not easy to find a stable job. Luckily, a few of his friends were familiar with his worth and skills (Arrue, Tovar, Amorós, Agud, Vallejo…).

In 1949 he married Matilde Martínez de Ilarduya. In 1951, he took part in a strike.

=== University ===
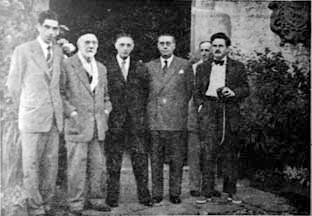
From left to right: Mitxelena, Pío Baroja, Angel Irigaray, Antonio Arrúe Zarauz, and Julio Caro Baroja in 1955

In 1954 he was appointed director of the Julio de Urquijo School of Basque Philology, as well as member of the editorial board of the magazine Egan. At the same time, he began giving classes in Salamanca, on the urging of his friend Antonio Tovar. In 1958 he received the Larramendi Chair in Basque Language and Literature at Salamanca University (the first such chair dedicated to Basque in a Spanish university). He received his doctorate in 1959. In 1968, he became professor of Indoeuropean linguistics. This period in Salamanca was to be one of the happiest times in his life, for both Mitxelena and for his family.

=== Creation of Unified Basque ===
At the same time as he began giving classes in Salamanca, the Royal Academy of the Basque Language charged him with the great responsibility of unifying the written Basque language, among other things because of the disputes caused by the use of the letter H. His point of view was not the neutral one of a linguist, but also had the input of sociolinguistics in his mind. He clearly saw that it would be necessary to build Unified Basque on the most useful of the central Basque dialects. In the same way, he saw where the future could come from, and knew to connect with the sensibilities had by the young Bascophiles of the time.

=== Teaching in Paris ===
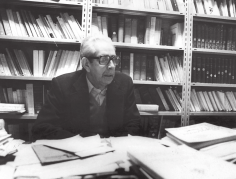
Mitxelena in 1970

One of the famous consequences of the events of May 1968 in France was the decentralization and extension of the university. Between 1969 and 1971, Mitxelena taught comparative Basque linguistics at the Sorbonne as professeur associé and chargé de cours in the École Pratique des Hautes Études. The friendship Mitxelena had with André Martinet at this time should be mentioned. At the beginning, he would often visit Martinet's house, and he eventually entered into his circle of friends and scientists, as well as into his publishing network.

=== A multifaceted and acute observer ===
Mitxelena was a linguist of true calling, and had knowledge of many languages, but beyond that, he was an avid reader of literature, including detective novels. He also had an interest in the cinema, writing many interesting reviews and critiques in Basque. He was asked to be part of many juries at cultural events, and his advice was sought for judgments on the level of education and culture.

=== In the Basque Country again: Creating the University of the Basque Country ===
During the period of Spain's political transition and first elections, Mitxelena was still in Salamanca. He nevertheless maintained close ties with the Basque Country and took part in many major events there. One was the creation of the University of the Basque Country (EHU-UPV) and cultural normalization. In his later years, starting in 1978, Mitxelena taught at the EHU-UPV and was active in preparing the first generation of Basque philologists. Mitxelena also spent many years preparing a Basque dictionary. The first volume of the General Basque Dictionary was finally published in 1987, but Mitxelena was unable to see it, as he had died shortly before, in that same year. Later, Ibon Sarasola, who had worked with Mitxelena on the project, continued to lead work on the dictionary, until completing its publication in 2005.

== Works ==
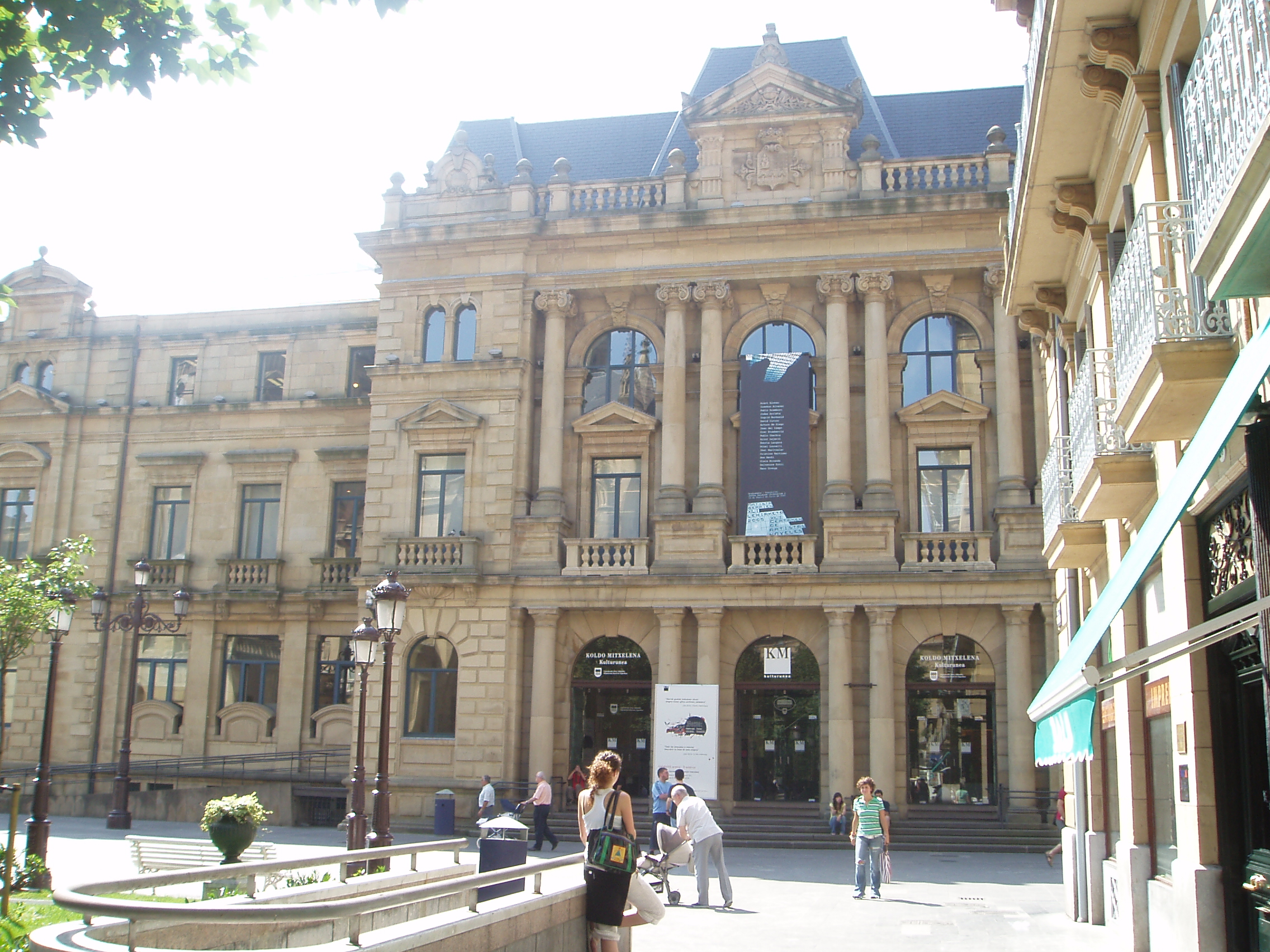
House of Culture of Koldo Mitxelena in San Sebastián

Mitxelena wrote twelve books, 260 articles, and 236 reviews and critiques. Some of his works are:

- Apellidos vascos ("Basque Surnames") (1955)
- Historia de la literatura vasca ("History of the Basque Literature") (1960)
- Fonética histórica vasca ("Historical Phonetics of Basque") (1961; 2nd edn. 1877; 3rd edn. 1985)
- Lenguas y protolenguas ("Languages and Proto-Languages") (1963)
- Textos arcaicos vascos ("Archaic Basque Texts") (1964)
- Sobre el pasado de la lengua vasca ("On the History of the Basque Language") (1964)
- Mitxelenaren idazlan hautatuak ("Selected Writings of Mitxelena") (1972)
- Koldo Mitxelena. Euskal idazlan guztiak ("Koldo Mitxelena: Complete Basque Writings"), Euskal klasikoak 21-29 (1988)
- Orotariko euskal hiztegia ("General Basque Dictionary") (1987–2005)

== See also ==
- Proto-Basque
- Basque people
- Basque Country
