= Joaquín Gorrochategui =

Spanish linguist (born 1953)

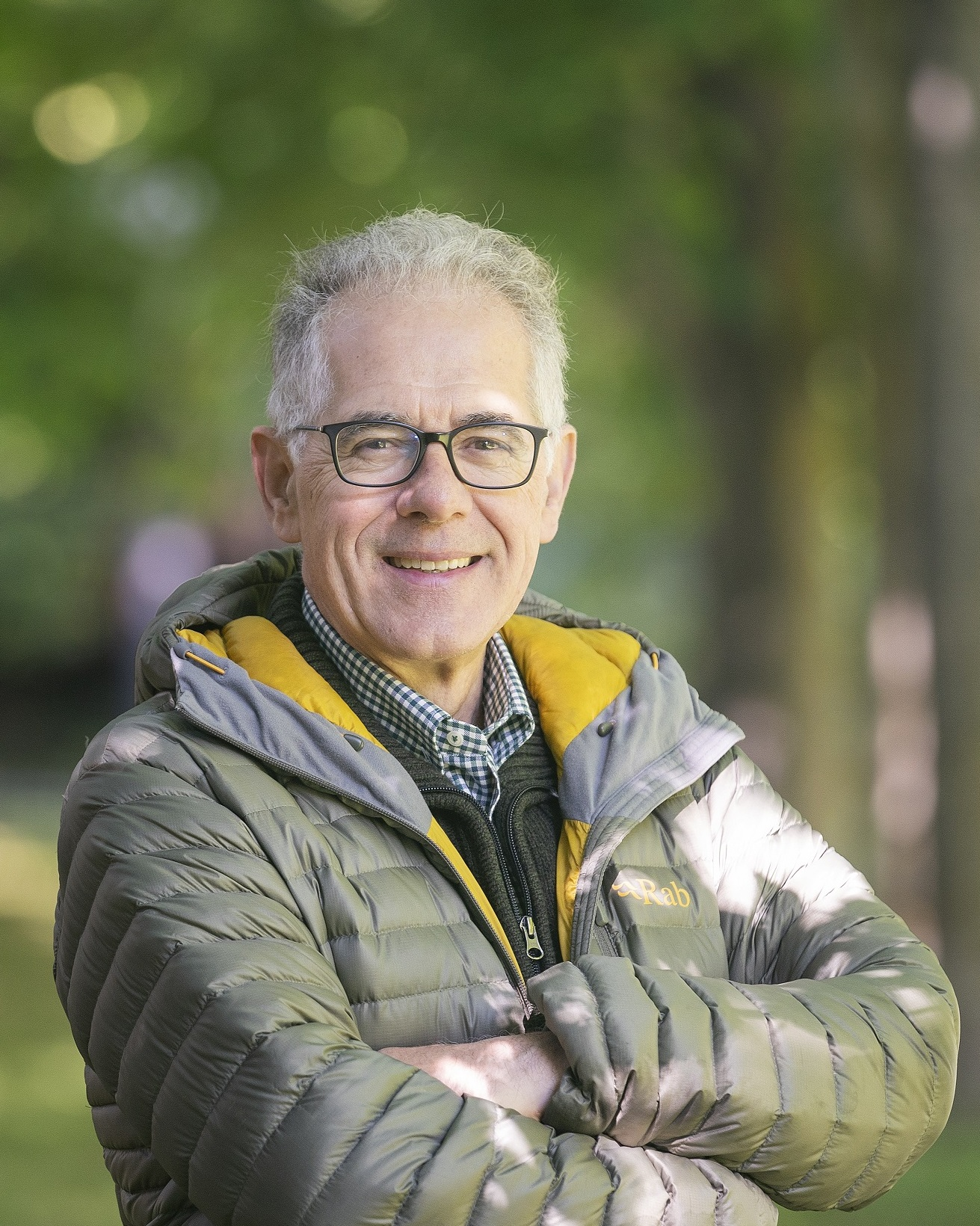
- Gorrochategui in 2024
- Born: August 17, 1953 (age 73); Eibar, Spain
- Education: University of Salamanca
- Known for: Aquitanian onomastics; History of the Basque language; Reading of the Hand of Irulegi
- Awards: Euskadi Prize for Research (2023)
- Scientific career
- Fields: Historical linguistics; Indo-European studies; Palaeohispanic languages
- Institutions: University of the Basque Country
- Doctoral advisor: Koldo Mitxelena

Joaquín Gorrochategui Churruca (born 17 August 1953) is a Spanish linguist, emeritus professor of Indo-European linguistics at the University of the Basque Country (UPV/EHU). He works in historical linguistics on the languages of the pre-Roman Iberian Peninsula and the ancient languages of Western Europe, and is regarded as a leading authority on the history of the Basque language. A pupil and continuator of Koldo Mitxelena, he coordinates the Hesperia database of Palaeohispanic languages and epigraphy, and in 2023 was awarded the Euskadi Research Prize.

== Early life and education ==
Gorrochategui was born in Eibar, in the Basque Country, on 17 August 1953. He read classical philology at the University of Salamanca, where he took his licenciatura and his doctorate. He completed the doctorate in 1982 with a thesis on the indigenous onomastics of Aquitaine, supervised by Koldo Mitxelena. He then studied at Toulouse and undertook postgraduate work on Celtic linguistics at the University of Bonn under Karl Horst Schmidt. As a researcher he held stays at the University of Wales, Aberystwyth, the Ausonius Institute of the University of Bordeaux and the University of Rome Tor Vergata, and was a visiting professor at the École pratique des hautes études in Paris.

== Career ==
Gorrochategui became professor (catedrático) of Indo-European linguistics in the Department of Classical Studies at the University of the Basque Country, and later professor emeritus. He has directed the university's Institute for the Sciences of Antiquity and its doctoral programme in linguistics, and served as dean of the Faculty of Letters and as director of its publishing division. He edited the journal Veleia for 27 years, from 1985 to 2012. He coordinates the Hesperia database, a project of several Spanish universities for the digital edition of the Palaeohispanic languages and inscriptions, sits on the international executive committee for Palaeohispanic languages, and belongs to the editorial boards of several journals. He has supervised doctoral theses in Basque, Italic, Slavic and Palaeohispanic linguistics.

Gorrochategui served on the Basque-language advisory council of the provincial council (Diputación Foral) of Álava and on the expert commission convened to assess the authenticity of the Iruña-Veleia graffiti. In a study published in 2011 he treated the inscriptions as modern forgeries. In 2022 he was the specialist charged with reading and interpreting the inscription on the Hand of Irulegi.

== Research ==
Gorrochategui works in historical and comparative linguistics, combining linguistic evidence with the historical and epigraphic record. His research centres on the linguistic situation of ancient Western Europe, and of the pre-Roman Iberian Peninsula in particular. His work follows three main lines. The first is the earliest stages of Basque, documented in the onomastic remains of southern Aquitaine and the northern Iberian Peninsula and reaching into medieval onomastics. The second is the ancient Indo-European languages of the peninsula, in particular Celtiberian and Lusitanian. The third is bilingualism and language contact in antiquity, both among the pre-Roman languages (Aquitanian, Iberian and Gaulish) and between them and Latin.

His doctoral research appeared as the monograph Onomástica indígena de Aquitania (1984), a study of the Aquitanian language.

== Recognition ==
Gorrochategui is a full member (académico de número) of Jakiunde, the Academy of Sciences, Arts and Letters of the Basque Country, and a corresponding member of Euskaltzaindia (the Royal Academy of the Basque Language) and of the Real Academia Española. He sits on the board of trustees of Ikerbasque, the Basque Foundation for Science. In 2023 he was awarded the Euskadi Research Prize (Premio Euskadi de Investigación) in the field of Social Sciences and Humanities, for his academic career and his contribution to research training in the school founded by Mitxelena.

== Selected works ==
- Gorrochategui, Joaquín (1984). Onomástica indígena de Aquitania. Bilbao: Universidad del País Vasco.
- Gorrochategui, Joaquín (1987). "En torno a la clasificación del lusitano". Studia palaeohispanica. Actas del IV Coloquio sobre lenguas y culturas paleohispánicas. Vitoria-Gasteiz. pp. 77–91.
- Gorrochategui, Joaquín (1994). "La declinación céltica de los temas en -a y los datos hispanos". In Bielmeier, Roland; Stempel, Reinhard (eds.). Indogermanica et Caucasica. Festschrift für Karl Horst Schmidt. Berlin/New York: Walter de Gruyter. pp. 316–330.
- Gorrochategui, Joaquín (1995). "Basque and its Neighbours in Antiquity". In Hualde, José Ignacio; Lakarra, Joseba A.; Trask, R. L. (eds.). Towards a History of the Basque Language. Amsterdam/Philadelphia: John Benjamins. pp. 31–63.
- Gorrochategui, Joaquín (1995). "Los Pirineos entre Galia e Hispania: las lenguas". Veleia. 12: 181–234.
- Gorrochategui, Joaquín (1997). "Die Crux des Keltiberischen". Zeitschrift für celtische Philologie. 49–50: 250–272.
- Gorrochategui, Joaquín (2009). "Vasco antiguo: algunas cuestiones de geografía e historia lingüísticas". Palaeohispanica. 9: 539–555.
- Gorrochategui, Joaquín (2011). "Hic et nunc: Falsificaciones contemporáneas. El caso de Iruña-Veleia". In Carbonell, Joan; Gimeno, Helena; Moralejo, José Luis (eds.). El monumento epigráfico en contextos secundarios. Bellaterra: Universitat Autònoma de Barcelona. pp. 241–263.
