= Hand of Irulegi =

Vasconic archaeological artifact from 1st century BC

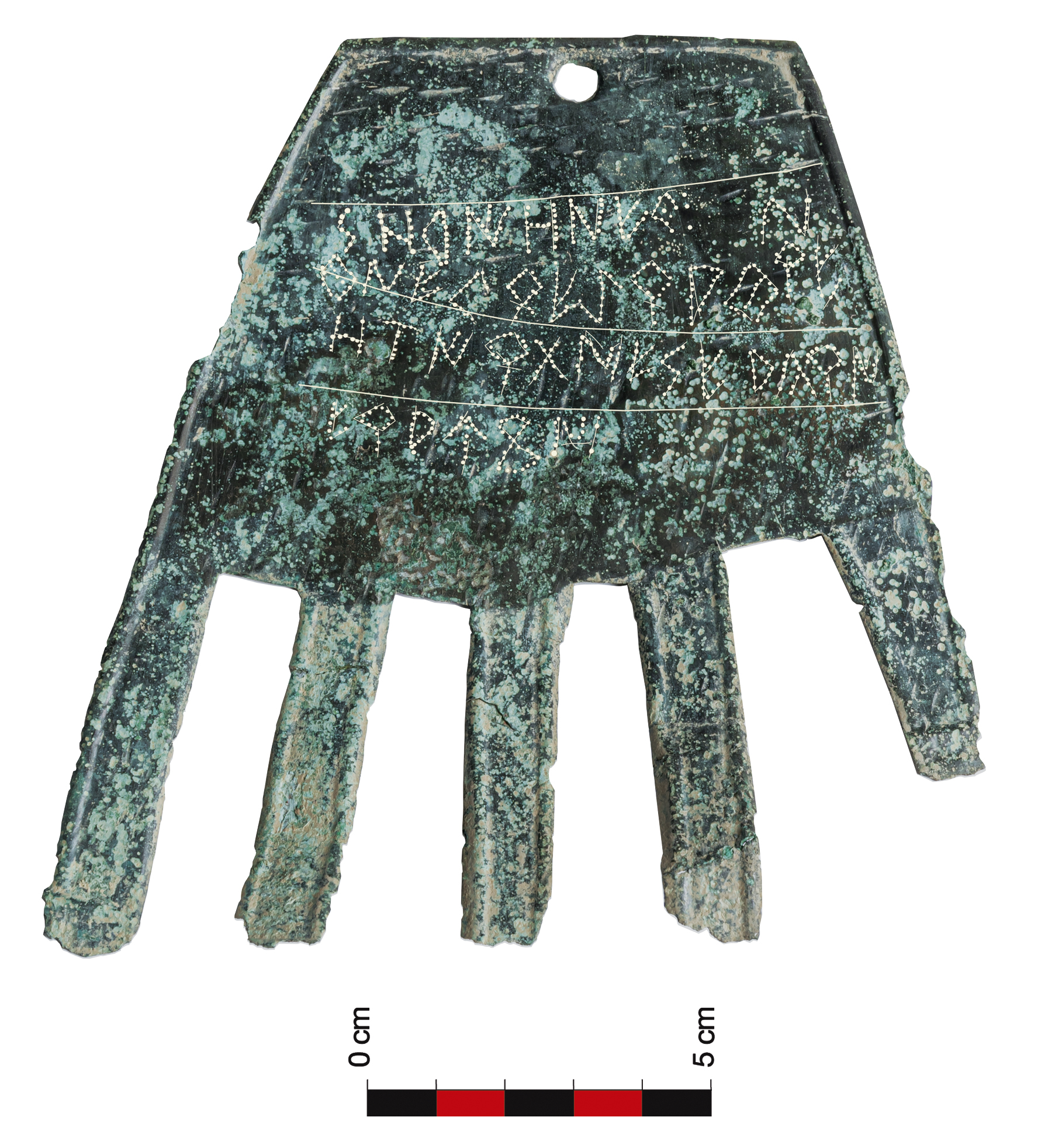
- Year: Between 80 and 72 BC
- Medium: bronze
- Subject: hand-shaped charm
- Dimensions: 143.1 mm × 127.9 mm (5.63 in × 5.04 in)
- Weight: 35.9
- Condition: Fair
- Location: Aranguren, Navarre, Spain
- Website: Aranzadi Science Society

The Hand of Irulegi is a late Iron Age archaeological artifact unearthed in 2021 during excavations in the archaeological site of Irulegi (Navarre), next to the medieval castle of Irulegi, located in the municipality of Aranguren, Spain. The bronze artifact has the distinctive shape of a right hand with extended fingers. It has five separate strings of letters using the northeastern Iberian script, probably corresponding to five or more words, carved on the side that represents the back of a hand.

Due to the importance and unique nature of the Irulegi Hand, the Government of Navarre announced on September 4, 2023, that it had begun the process of having it declared an Asset of Cultural Interest. On the anniversary of its discovery, it also announced that the Irulegi Hand would be exhibited at the Museum of Navarre, probably during the summer of 2024. However, this intention was fulfilled later, as on December 17, the Hand was put on display in the museum's recently renovated prehistoric room. As of 2024, it was being temporarily kept there, pending the completion of renovations to Room 1.1, which is dedicated to the Roman period.

== Context and form ==
The "Hand of Irulegi" (Note: Basque: Irulegiko eskua, Spanish: Mano de Irulegi) has been a working title assigned to the archaeological find. It dates from the 1st century BC. At the time, during the period of Sertorian Wars, the native Vasconic population took sides and the settlement came under attack, extending the fire throughout the fortified town as a result. As outlined by Juantxo Agirre Mauleon, secretary of the Science Society Aranzadi, which conducted the excavation, the roof of the dwelling collapsed, which allowed for the preservation of archaeological remains under the debris. The hand may have hung from the door, where it provided protection for the house. According to a report in The Economist, 'such striking hand-shaped designs are unknown in Spanish or neighbouring cultures'. It has been linked to Iberian and Celtiberian trophies representing the cut hand of a defeated enemy. However, similar objects known as hamsa are found in various cultures of the Middle East and North Africa, including Phoenician colonies in the Iberian peninsula.

== Inscription ==
The inscription was incised and later marked over with dots. The letters do not match exactly in the scratched and the dotted version. It is unclear if both versions are from the same author or the dotted version is from a second author.

The text as published before cleaning can be transliterated from Northeastern Iberian script as:

sorioneku · {n}
tenekebeekiŕateŕe[n]
oNiŕtan · eseakaŕi
eŕaukon ·

After cleaning, the texts are transliterated as:

Incised text

sorioneke
kunekeřekiřateŕe//n
oTiřtaneseakaŕi
eŕaukon

Incised text

sorioneke
kunekeřekiřateŕen
ońiřtaś̱ese akaŕi
eŕaukon

Dotted text

sorioneku·
kunekebeekiŕateŕe//n
oTiŕtan·eseakaŕi
eŕaukon·

The dotted text differs in the use of ⟨·⟩. While it could have been used as a word divider, it is used at the end of the lines 1 and 4, where the line break would already signal a different word. On line 3 it has a different aspect, leading to questions about its use. The symbol transliterated as ⟨ř⟩ corresponds to the Iberian letter usually transliterated as ⟨ŕ⟩ but with a horizontal line across the descender. This is the first time this shape is found. It may represent a multiple alveolar consonant. A symbol scratched in line 2 as ⟨ř⟩ is dotted as be, perhaps by the dotting author misreading the incision.

The first string of letters is read as sorioneku in its dotted version, echoed in the present-day Basque language by the widely used zorioneko, a declined word meaning "(of) good fortune(s)". The modern meaning of zorioneko as "(of) good fortune" is not attested in Basque before the 18th century, but a flection-derivation of the sequence zori ‘fortune’ + (h)on ‘good’ is of early date within the Basque vocabulary; even the union of both elements is recorded in the oldest Basque documents. The sgraffito version, however, offers sorioneke. This word could mention the divinity, be it Good Fortune or another deity, to which the inscription would have been dedicated.

The first word is accompanied by at least four other words whose meaning is not as apparent. The inscription contains a ⟨⟩-shaped letter that has only been found in Vasconic areas, previously seen on two coins. The phonetic value of this letter is known, it is N, but transliterated as capital ⟨T⟩ above. Two unpublished coins found at the same location are minted in oNtikes.

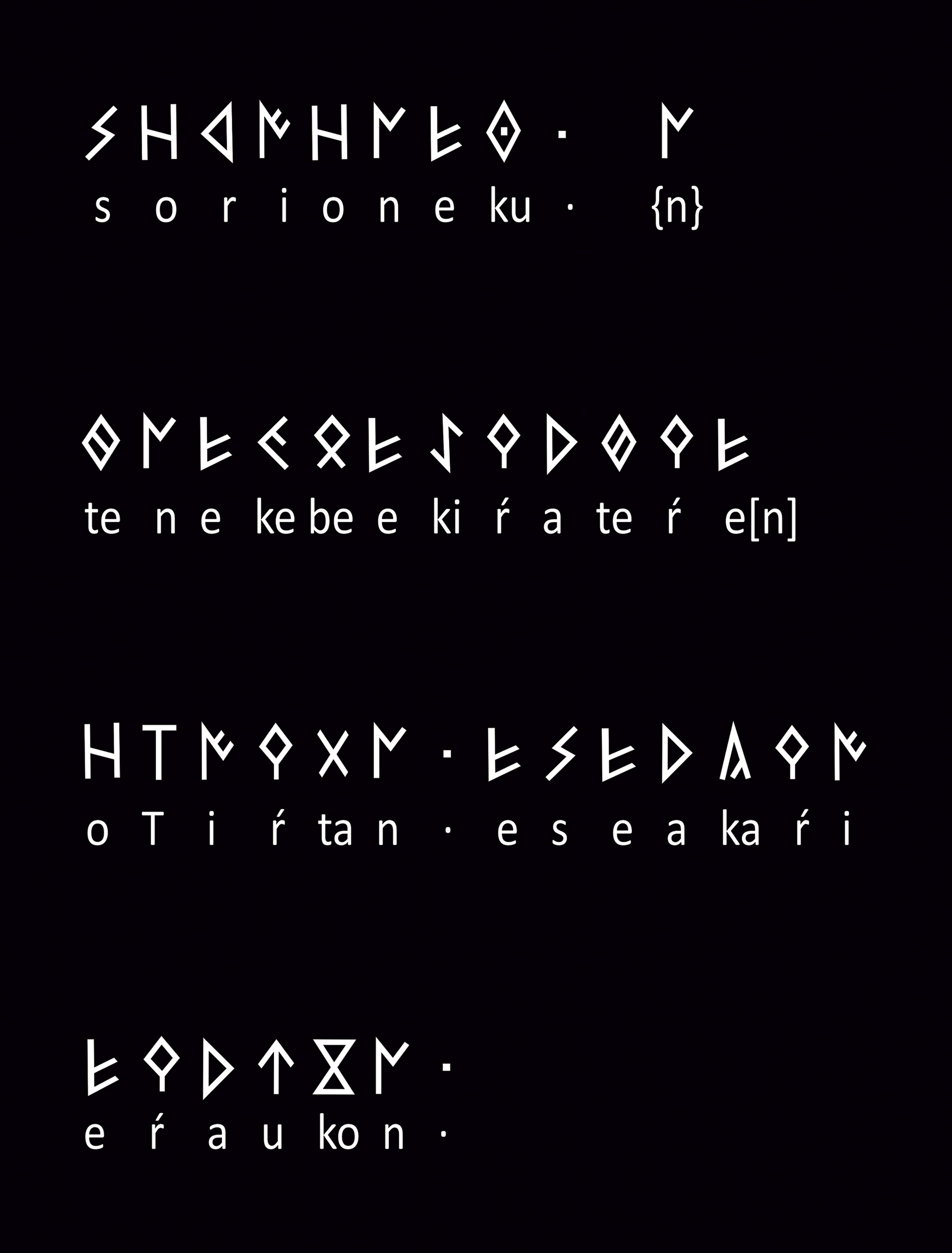
Transcription of characters into the Latin alphabet before the cleaning.

Among the rest of the words identified, eŕaukon is the most likely to be a verbal form, both because of its form and its final position. Its form recalls the Basque form of the past tense of the auxiliary verb zeraukon, used in eastern dialects.

== Discovery ==
Although announced on 14 November 2022, with the intervention of the regional president of Navarre, the unearthing goes back to June 2021, when the excavating team led by Mattin Aiestaran found it. The piece was then handed over to researchers for their consideration, who have hailed it as highly important.

On 18 January 2022, during the cleaning process, Carmen Usua, the restorer, noticed that there was writing present. Epigraphers found that the hand had a natural downward position.

== Gallery ==
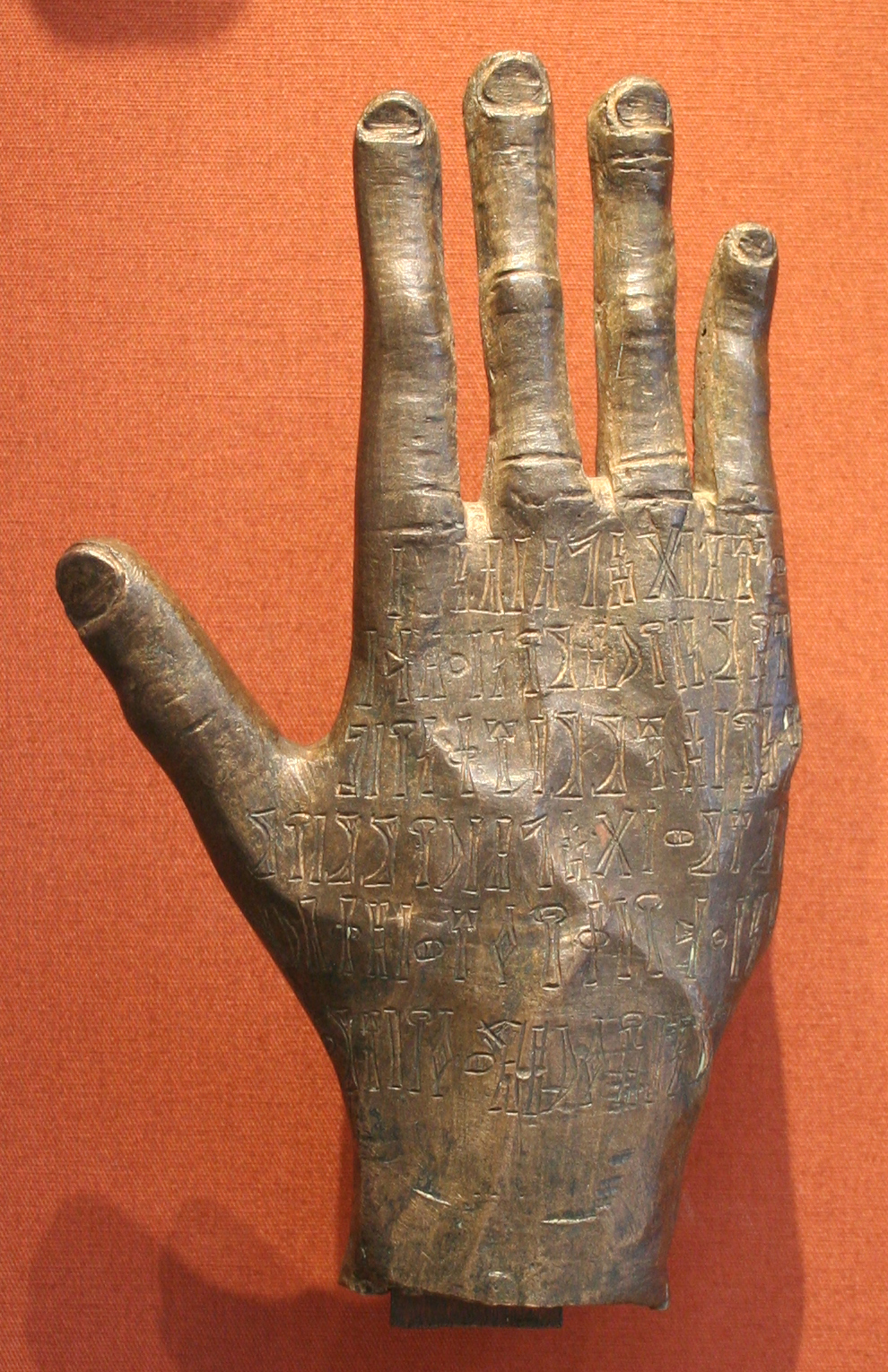
This metallic hand from 2nd-3rd century AD Zafar, Yemen with a dedication to Ta'lab has been offered as a distant parallel.

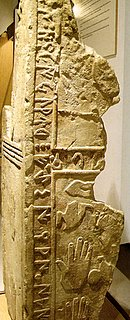
The 1st-2nd century AD La Vispesa (Huesca province) stela (exhibited upside down) features downwards cut hands and a dismembered handless corpse.

== See also ==
- Hamsa
- Iturissa
- Aquitanian language
- Proto-Basque language
- History of the Basque language
- Paleohispanic scripts
- Khirbet el-Qom
