= José Ignacio Hualde =

Spanish linguist

José Ignacio Hualde [ˈ(g)wal.de] is a Spanish linguist specializing in Basque linguistics and in Spanish synchronic and diachronic phonology, professor of linguistics in the Department of Spanish and Portuguese, and in the Department of Linguistics, at the University of Illinois at Urbana–Champaign. He is also the current vice president of the Association for Laboratory Phonology. He received his MA in Spanish, and his MA and PhD in linguistics from the University of Southern California.

== Bibliography ==
=== Authored books ===
- Catalan (1992)
- Basque Phonology (1991)
- Euskararen azentuerak [the accentual systems of Basque] (1997)

=== Co-authored books ===
- The sounds of Spanish (2005)
- Introducción a la lingüística hispánica (2001)
- A Phonological Study of the Basque Dialect of Getxo (1992)
- The Basque Dialect of Lekeitio (1994)

=== Co-edited books ===
- Generative Studies in Basque Linguistics (1993)
- Towards a History of the Basque Language (1995)
- A Grammar of Basque (2003)

=== Journal articles ===
- Hualde, José I. "Unstressed words in Spanish." Language Sciences 31.2-3 (2009): 199–212.
- Hualde, José I., Oihana Lujanbio, and Francisco Torreira. "Lexical tone and stress in Goizueta Basque." Journal of the International Phonetic Association 38.1 (2008): 1–24.
- Hualde, José I., Miquel Simonet, and Francisco Torreira. "Postlexical contraction of nonhigh vowels in Spanish." Lingua 118 (2008): 1906–1925.
- Hualde, José I., and Armin Schwegler. "Intonation in Palenquero." Journal of Pidgin and Creole Languages 23.1 (2008): 1–31.
- Eddington, David, and José I. Hualde. "El abundante agua fría: Hermaphroditic Spanish nouns." Studies in Hispanic and Lusophone Linguistics 1.1 (2008): 5–31.
- Chitoran, Ioana, and José I. Hualde. "From hiatus to diphthong: the evolution of vowel sequences in Romance." Phonology 24 (2007): 37–75.
- Hualde, José I., and Koldo Zuazo. "The standardization process of the Basque language." Language Problems and Language Planning 31.2 (2007): 143–168.
- Hualde, José I. "Stress removal and stress addition in Spanish." Journal of Portuguese Linguistics 5.2 (2006): 59–89.
