= R. L. Trask =

American-British linguist (1944–2004)

- Born: Robert Lawrence Trask; 10 November 1944; Olean, New York, U.S.
- Died: 27 March 2004 (aged 59); Brighton, England
- Spouses: Esther Barrutia (divorced); Jan Lock

Academic background
- Education: Rensselaer Polytechnic Institute (B.Sc. in chemistry); Brandeis University (M.Sc. in chemistry); Polytechnic of Central London (B.A. in linguistics); School of Oriental and African Studies (Ph.D. in linguistics)
- Thesis: Synchronic and Diachronic Studies in the Grammar of Basque (1984)
- Doctoral advisor: Charles Ernest Bazell

Academic work
- Discipline: Linguist
- Institutions: Middle East Technical University (c. 1970); Polytechnic of Central London (1970s); University of Liverpool (1979–1988); University of Sussex (1988–2004)
- Main interests: Basque language; Historical linguistics
- Website: The Larry Trask Archive

Robert Lawrence Trask (10 November 1944 – 27 March 2004) was an American-British professor of linguistics at the University of Sussex, and an authority on the Basque language and the field of historical linguistics.

== Biography ==
Trask was born on 10 November 1944 in Olean, New York. He studied chemistry at Rensselaer Polytechnic Institute in the United States, and received his first degree. He got a master's degree from Brandeis University before joining the Peace Corps. In the Peace Corps, he taught at the Middle East Technical University in Ankara, Turkey, before leaving the country in 1970. He later received his doctorate in linguistics from the University of London, and afterwards taught at various universities in the United Kingdom. He became a professor of linguistics at the University of Sussex in 1988.

He was considered an authority on the Basque language. His book The History of Basque (1997) is considered an essential reference on diachronic Basque linguistics and a standard introduction to Basque linguistics. At the time of his death, he was attempting to compile an etymological dictionary of the Basque language; the unfinished work was posthumously published on the Internet by Max W. Wheeler.

Trask was also an authority on historical linguistics, and had written about the problem of the origin of language. He published two introductory books to linguistics: Language: The basics (1995) and Introducing Linguistics (coauthored with Bill Mayblin) (2000), and several dictionaries on different topics of this science: A dictionary of grammatical terms in linguistics (1993), A dictionary of phonetics and phonology (1996), A student's dictionary of language and linguistics (1997), Key concepts in language and linguistics (1999), The dictionary of historical and comparative linguistics (2000) and The Penguin dictionary of English grammar (2000).

Trask died on 27 March 2004 as a result of complications from amyotrophic lateral sclerosis (ALS). At the time of his death, a festschrift to honor him was in preparation.

== Publication ==
- Language Change (1994)
- Language: The Basics (1995)
- Historical Linguistics (1996), ISBN 0-340-60758-0
- The Penguin Guide to Punctuation (1997)
- The History of Basque (1997), ISBN 0415131162
- The Dictionary of Historical and Comparative Linguistics (2000), ISBN 0-7486-1001-4
- The Penguin Dictionary of English Grammar (2000), ISBN 0-14-051464-3
- Time Depth in Historical Linguistics (co-editor) (2000), ISBN 1-902937-06-6
- Mind the Gaffe (2001), ISBN 0-14-051476-7
- How to Write Effective Emails (2005), ISBN 0-14-101719-8
