= Dag Strömbäck =

Swedish philologist

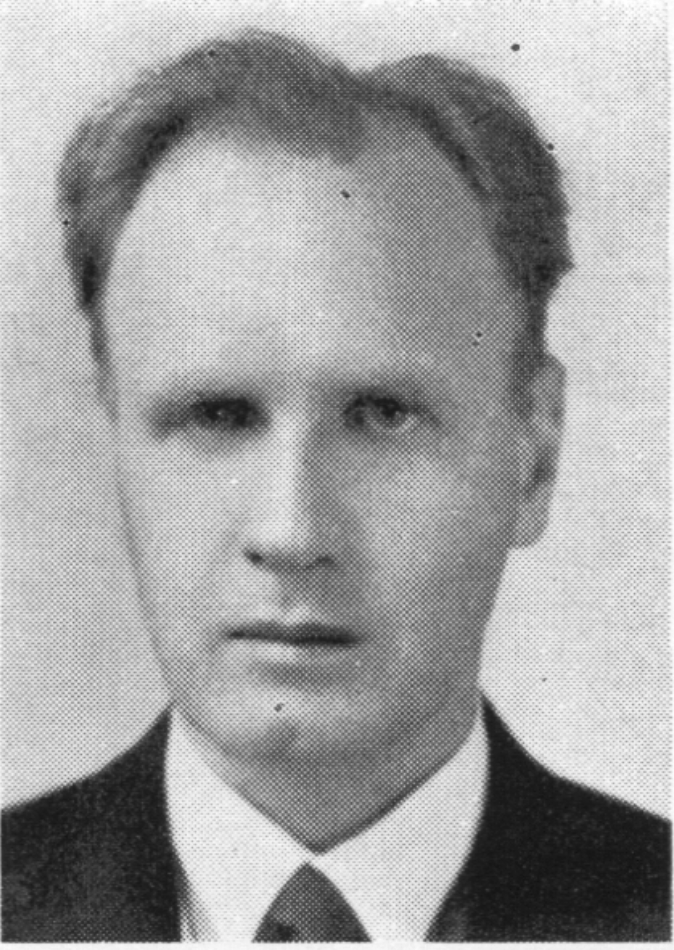
- Born: 13 August 1900; Järbo, Sweden
- Died: 1 December 1978 (aged 78); Uppsala, Sweden

Academic background
- Education: University of Uppsala
- Thesis: Sejd. Textstudier i nordisk religionshistoria (1935)

Academic work
- Discipline: Folklore; History of religion; Philology
- Sub-discipline: Old Norse studies
- Institutions: Uppsala University; Swedish Institute for Language and Folklore
- Main interests: Old Norse literature; Old Norse religion

Dag Alvar Strömbäck (13 August 1900 – 1 December 1978) was a Swedish folklorist, historian of religion and philologist. He was a professor at Uppsala University and also headed the Swedish Institute for Language and Folklore at Uppsala.

== Early life and education ==
Strömbäck was born in Järbo but grew up from the age of three in Alfta, where his father was appointed pastor. His elder brother Helge Strömbäck became a vice-admiral and Chief of the Swedish Navy.

After a classical education at Norra Latin in Stockholm, Strömbäck studied Old Norse and history of religion at Uppsala University, spending some time also at the University of Oslo and the University of Iceland (where he was an instructor in Swedish in 1926). He earned a B.A. in 1921 and a doctorate in Old Norse in 1935 with the thesis Sejd: Textstudier i nordisk religionshistoria (Seiðr: Textual Studies in the History of Norse Religion).

== Career ==
While completing his doctoral studies, Strömbäck worked at the university library in Uppsala and then from 1929 as a lexicographer and editor with the Svenska Akademiens ordbok, the national dictionary project, in Lund; he continued to work on the dictionary until 1940. In 1935 he became a docent in Icelandic philology at Lund University. In 1937–38, he was a visiting professor at the University of Chicago and was offered a permanent position, but he returned to Sweden in 1939 after one further year.

In 1940, he became a director of the Swedish Institute for Language and Folklore in Uppsala, where in 1944 he also became chief archivist. He continued to head the Institute until his retirement. In 1941, he became a docent in Nordic languages at Uppsala University; in July 1947 he was appointed Professor of Norse and Comparative Folklore. He took up the position in July 1948 and retired in July 1967.

From 1959 to 1963, he was a member of the Swedish National Council for Research in the Humanities. He became a member of the Royal Gustavus Adolphus Academy in 1935 and served as its president from 1957 to 1966, of the Royal Society of the Humanities at Uppsala in 1941, and of the Royal Swedish Academy of Letters, History and Antiquities in 1945, serving as its president from 1965 to 1973. He edited three major journals for many years: Arv, Saga och sed, and Svenska landsmål och svenskt folkliv, the first two then published by the Royal Gustavus Adolphus Academy and the last later taken over by it.

Strömbäck retired from Uppsala University in 1977.

== Selected publications ==
Strömbäck viewed the study of medieval Norse texts as inseparable from that of folklore, and resisted both purely methodological discussions and the subsuming of folklore by ethnography.

=== Books ===
- Sejd. Textstudier i nordisk religionshistoria. Stockholm, 1935 (dissertation)
- Tidrande och diserna. Ett filologiskt-folkloristiskt utkast. Lund, 1949
- Folklore och Filologi: Valda uppsatser utgivna av Kungl. Gustav Adolfs Akademien 13.8 1970. Acta Academiæ Regiæ Gustavi Adolphi 48. Uppsala: Almqvist & Wiksell, 1970 (selected essays)
- The Conversion of Iceland: A survey. Viking Society for Northern Research Text Series 6. London, 1975
- Den osynliga närvaron: studier i folktro och folkdikt. Ed. Gerd Jonzon. Hedemora: Gidlund, 1989 (posthumous essay collection)

=== Articles ===
- "Att helga land: Studier i Landnáma och det äldsta rituella besittningstagandet". In: Östen Undén, ed. Några sysnspunkter på begreppsbildning inom juridiken: Festskrift tillägnad Axel Hägerström den 6 september 1928 av Filosofiska och Juridiska Föreningarna i Uppsala. Uppsala / Stockholm: Almqvist & Wiksell, 1928. pp. 198–220
- "Författarskap och tradition i den isländska ättesagan". Kungl. humanistiska vetenskapssamfundet i Uppsala, Årsbok, 1943. pp. 37–55
- "Att binda helskor: anteckningar till Gisle Surssons saga". Kungl. humanistiska vetenskapssamfundet i Uppsala, Årsbok, 1952. pp. 37–55

== Honours ==
Strömbäck was awarded honorary doctorates by the University of Iceland and the University of Aberdeen. A festschrift entitled Folkloristica was published in 1960 to honour his 60th birthday.

== Personal life and death ==
He married Rosalie Olivecrona on 24 September 1927; they had one daughter, Gertrud Gidlund, a journalist and editor. He suffered a serious illness in 1974, but recovered; he died in Uppsala Municipality on 1 December 1978 and is buried in the old cemetery at Uppsala.

== See also ==
- Lily Weiser-Aall
- Otto Höfler
- Neil Price (archaeologist)
