= Michael Rießler =

German linguist (born 1971)

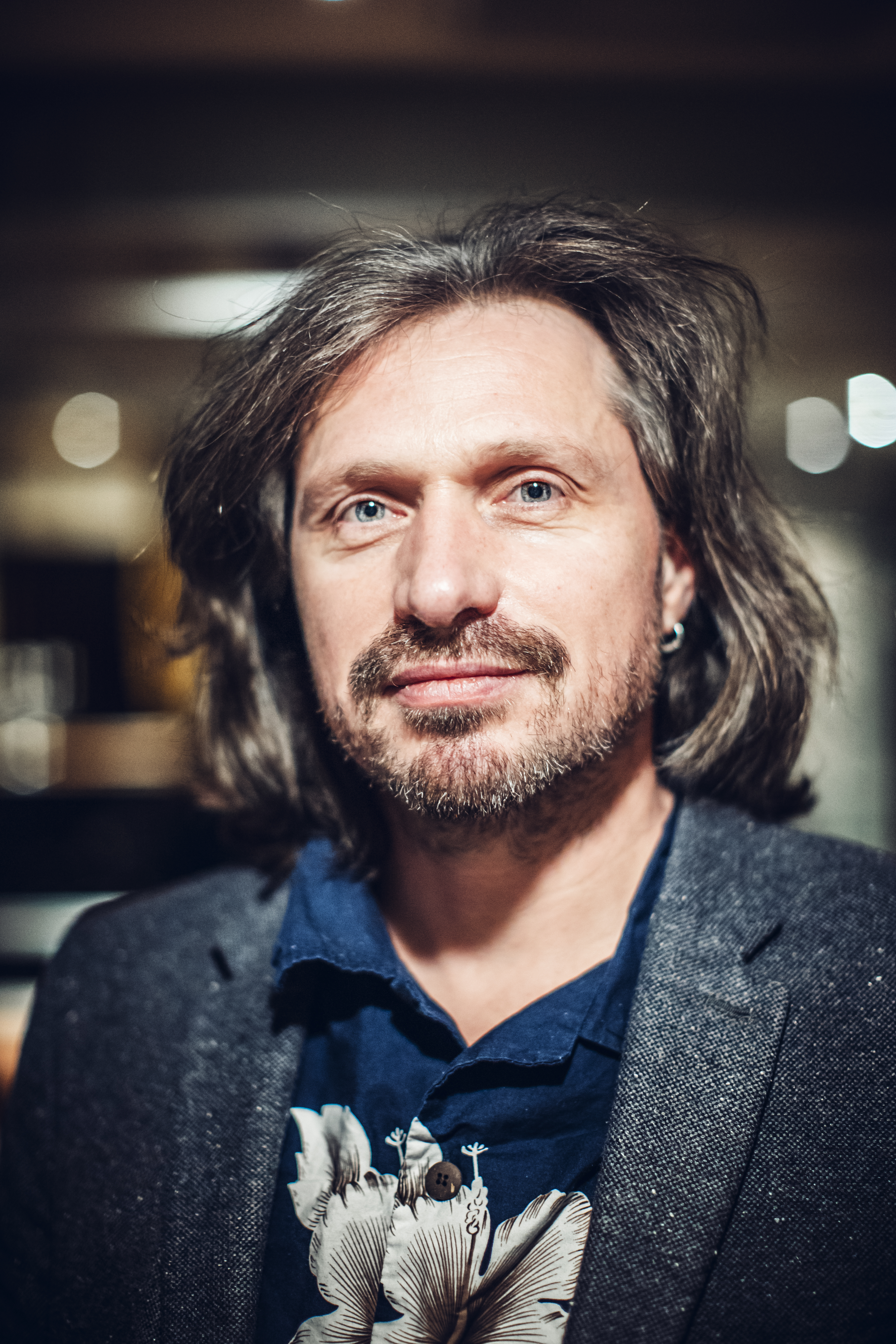
- Rießler in 2019
- Born: 16 February 1971 (age 55); Bad Belzig
- Occupation: Professor of general linguistics
- Employer: University of Eastern Finland

Michael Rießler, also transcribed Michael Riessler, (born 16 February 1971) is a German and Finnish linguist. In August 2020, Rießler was appointed professor at the University of Eastern Finland.

== Biography ==
Rießler was born in Bad Belzig. He grew up in the village of Borne, today a district of Bad Belzig, in the former East Germany, where his parents worked at a collective farm. He went to school in Belzig, studied agriculture and in 1990 completed his high school education with passing the Abitur at the Betriebsberufsschule des Volkseigenes Gutes Kaltenhausen in Jüterbog. From 1990 to 1991 he did his civil service service in Potsdam and then studied Nordic languages, European ethnology and Bulgarian at the Humboldt University of Berlin. In 2002 he completed a Master of Philosophy with a thesis on the influence of Sámi languages on Norwegian and Swedish dialects. His thesis, entitled Sprachwechsel und Sprachwandel in Nordskandinavien, was supervised by German scholar Jurij Kusmenko. Rießler and Kusmenko had already published a joint paper on Southern Sámi in 2000. In 2011 Rießler defended his doctoral thesis in linguistics at the University of Leipzig under the supervision of language typologist Balthasar Bickel.

== Research ==
Rießler has published scientific articles on North Germanic and Sámi languages and Komi, among other things in the fields of language typology, sociolinguistics, language documentation and language technology. Rießler's research interests also include Sámi literature. From 2008 to 2014 he was editor of the book series Kleine saamische Schriften (together with Elisabeth Scheller). Since 2014 he publishes (together with Thomas Mohnike and Joshua Wilbur) the journal Samica.

After graduation, Rießler worked at several universities, including in Germany, Norway and Finland, and conducted extensive field research, especially on the Kola Peninsula and in other areas of northwest Russia. He has also worked for the Äʹvv Skolt Sámi Museum.

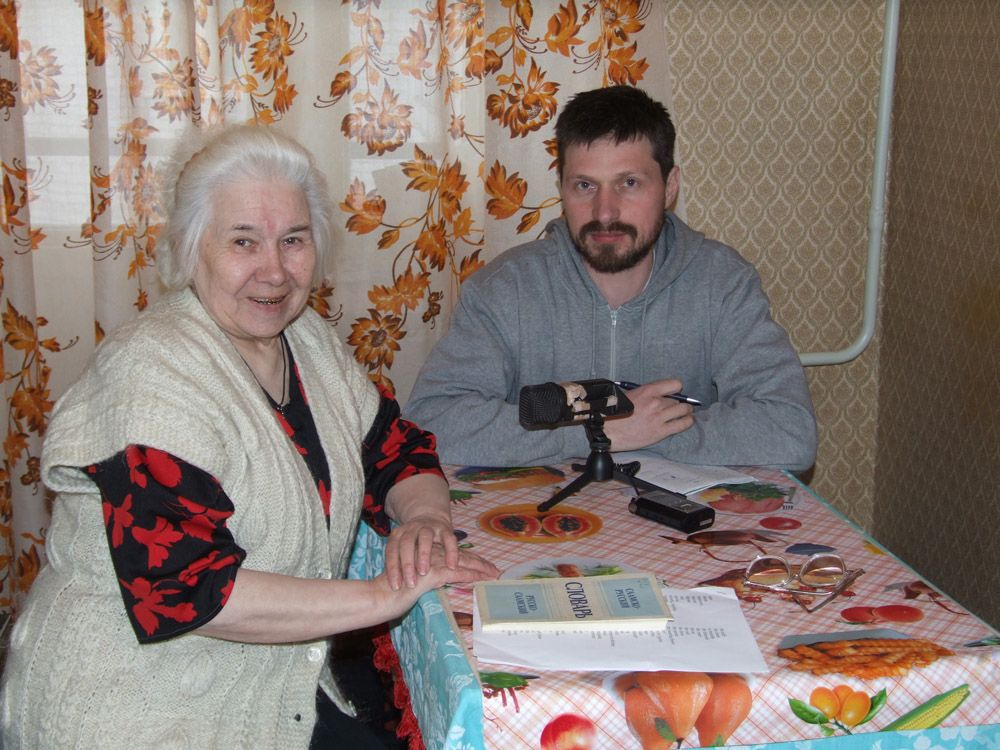
Field research with the help of Kildin Sámi Aleksandra Antonova in Lovozero, Russia (2008).

2014 and 2017–2018 Rießler had Fellowships at the Freiburg Institute for Advanced Studies. In autumn 2016 he was visiting professor at the École Normale Supérieure For three semesters between 2017 and 2019 he was a representative of the Chair of General Linguistics at Bielefeld University. In 2015 he was appointed as Privatdozent at the University of Helsinki (venia docendi in Finno-Ugric languages) and in 2018 at the University of Turku (venia docendi in general and Finno-Ugric linguistics). In August 2020 Rießler was appointed Professor of general linguistics at the University of Eastern Finland.

== Publications (selected) ==
=== Monography ===
- 2016 Adjective attribution. Berlin: Language Science Press. ISBN 978-3-944675-65-7

=== Article ===
- 2020 "Partial fusion in long-term bilingualism: The case of vernacular Kildin Saami, in: International Journal of Bilingualism (with Nikolaj Hakimov)
- 2017 "Documenting endangered oral histories of the Arctic : a proposed symbiosis for endangered language documentation and oral history research, illustrated by Saami and Komi examples", in: Oral History meets Linguistics. Fürstenberg: Kulturstiftung Sibirien, p. 31–64 (with Joshua Wilbur)
- 2016 "Utilizing language technology in the documentation of endangered Uralic languages", in: Northern European Journal of Language Technology 4, p. 29–47 (with Ciprian Gerstenberger, Niko Partanen, Joshua Wilbur)
- 2011 Komi-Saami-Russian contacts on the Kola peninsula, in: Language contact in times of globalization. Amsterdam: Rodopi, p. 5–26 (with Rogier Blokland)
- 2004 On the origin of preaspiration in North Germanic, in: Journal of Indo-European Monograph Series 49, p. 168–185
- 2002 Der partitive Artikel in nordskandinavischen Dialekten, in: TijdSchrift voor Skandinavistiek 23:1, p. 43–62
- 2000 Traces of Sámi-Scandinavian contact in Scandinavian dialects, in: Languages in Contact. Amsterdam: Rodopi, p. 209–224 (with Jurij Kuzmenko)

=== Edition ===
- 2019 Worte verschwinden fliegen zum blauen Licht : Samische Lyrik von Joik bis Rap. Freiburg: Skandinavisches Seminar der Albert-Ludwigs-Universität (with Johanna Domokos, Christine Schlosser). ISBN 978-3-9816835-3-0
- 2015 Cultural and linguistic minorities in the Russian Federation and the European Union : Comparative studies on equality and diversity. Cham: Springer (with Heiko F. Marten, Janne Saarikivi, Reetta Toivanen). ISBN 978-3-319-10454-6
- 2015 New trends in Nordic and General Linguistics. Berlin: De Gruyter (with Martin Hilpert, Jan-Ola Östman, Christine Mertzlufft, Janet Duke). ISBN 978-3-11-034697-8
