= Malå Municipality =

Malå Municipality Malå kommun
- Municipality
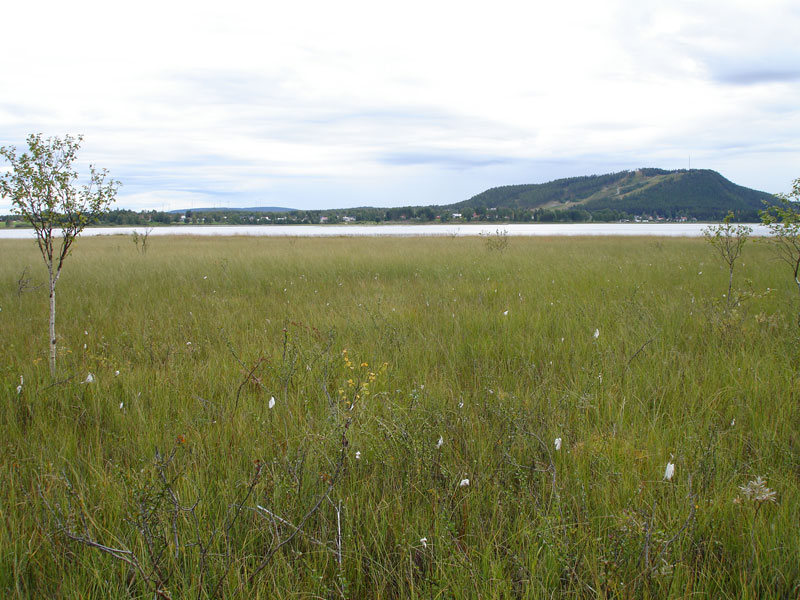

- Coat of arms

- Coordinates: 65°11′N 18°45′E
- Country: Sweden
- County: Västerbotten County
- Seat: Malå

Area
  - Total: 1,727.48 km^{2} (666.98 sq mi)
  - Land: 1,598.95 km^{2} (617.36 sq mi)
  - Water: 128.53 km^{2} (49.63 sq mi)
- Area as of 1 January 2014.

Population (30 June 2025)
  - Total: 2,954
  - Density: 1.847/km^{2} (4.785/sq mi)
- Time zone: UTC+1 (CET)
  - Summer (DST): UTC+2 (CEST)
- ISO 3166 code: SE
- Province: Lapland
- Municipal code: 2418
- Website: www.mala.se

Malå Municipality (Swedish: Malå kommun; Ume Sami: Málágen kommuvdna) is a municipality in Västerbotten County in northern Sweden. Its seat is located in Malå.

== History ==
Between 1974 and 1982 Malå Municipality was included in Norsjö Municipality. In 1983 it was re-established within its former boundaries.

== Geography ==
The municipality is situated within the province of Lapland, and as such is characterized by a sparse population and wide areas of untouched nature and wildlife.

Malå Municipality is also one of the southernmost outposts of the native Sami people settlements.

The nearest towns are Arvidsjaur and Lycksele, at a distance of about 80 kilometers, taking about an hour to drive. Both towns have airports with routes to larger cities such as Stockholm.

The nearest cities are Skellefteå, Luleå and Umeå on the east coast, each about 200 kilometers away.

=== Locality ===
There is only one locality (or urban area) in Malå Municipality:

#	Locality	Population
1	Malå	2,089

== Demographics ==
This is a demographic table based on Malå Municipality's electoral districts in the 2022 Swedish general election sourced from SVT's election platform, in turn taken from SCB official statistics.

In total there were 3,034 residents, including 2,259 Swedish citizens of voting age. 54.9 % voted for the left coalition and 44.4 % for the right coalition. The left coalition won both electoral districts by larger margins than the overall mean, due to the postal vote seeing a majority for the right coalition. This slightly narrowed the overall margin. Indicators are in percentage points except population totals and income.

Location	Residents	Citizen adults	Left vote	Right vote	Employed	Swedish parents	Foreign heritage	Income SEK	Degree
Location			%	%					
Malå 1	1,502	1,113	55.3	44.2	87	90	10	25,400	27
Malå 2	1,532	1,146	58.7	40.4	84	84	16	23,083	24
Source: SVT
