= ISOF =

ISOF may refer to:

- Iraqi Special Operations Forces, the operational arm of the Iraqi Counter Terrorism Service
- Swedish Institute for Language and Folklore (Institutet för språk och folkminnen)
