= Preaspiration =

Consonant preceded by strong burst of air

In phonetics, preaspiration (sometimes spelled pre-aspiration) is a period of voicelessness or aspiration preceding the closure of a voiceless obstruent, basically an [h]-like sound preceding the obstruent. In other words, when an obstruent is preaspirated, voicing stops and the glottis is opened for some time before the obstruent closure. To mark preaspiration using the International Phonetic Alphabet, the diacritic for regular aspiration, ⟨ʰ⟩, can be placed before the preaspirated consonant. However, Ladefoged & Maddieson (1996:70) prefer to use a simple cluster notation, e.g. ⟨hk⟩ instead of ⟨ʰk⟩.

== Typology ==
Preaspiration is comparatively uncommon across languages of the world, and is claimed by some to not be phonemically contrastive in any language. Ladefoged & Maddieson (1996) note that, at least in the case of Icelandic, preaspirated stops have a longer duration of aspiration than normally aspirated (post-aspirated) stops, comparable to clusters of [h]+consonant in languages with such clusters. As a result, they view preaspiration as purely a distributional feature, indistinguishable phonetically and phonologically from clusters with /h/, and prefer to notate preaspirated stops as clusters, e.g. Icelandic kappi /ˈkʰahpi/ "hero" rather than /ˈkʰaʰpi/.

A distinction is often made between so-called normative and non-normative preaspiration: in a language with normative preaspiration of certain voiceless obstruents, the preaspiration is obligatory even though it is not a distinctive feature; in a language with non-normative preaspiration, the preaspiration can be phonetically structured for those who use it, but it is non-obligatory, and may not appear with all speakers. Preaspirated consonants are typically in free variation with spirant-stop clusters, though they may also have a relationship (synchronically and diachronically) with long vowels or [s]-stop clusters.

Preaspiration can take a number of different forms; while the most usual is glottal friction (an [h]-like sound), the precise phonetic quality can be affected by the obstruent or the preceding vowel, becoming for example [ç] after close vowels; other potential realizations include [x], voiceless vowels, and even [f].

Preaspiration is very unstable both synchronically and diachronically and is often replaced by a fricative or by a lengthening of the preceding vowel.

== Distribution ==
Preaspiration is perhaps best known from North Germanic languages, most prominently in Icelandic and Faroese, but also some dialects of Norwegian and Swedish. It is also a prominent feature of Scottish Gaelic. The presence of preaspiration in Gaelic has been attributed to North Germanic influence. Within Northwestern Europe preaspiration is furthermore found in most Sami languages, except Inari Sami where it has been replaced by postaspiration. The historical relationship between preaspiration in Sami and North Germanic is disputed: there is general agreement of a connection, but not on whether it represents Sami influence in North Germanic, North Germanic influence in Sami, or parallel sprachbund influence in both languages.

Elsewhere in the world, preaspiration occurs in Halh Mongolian, Western Yugur, and in several American indigenous languages, including dialects of Hopi, Purepecha, and many languages of the Algonquian family (such as Cheyenne, Cree, Ojibwe, Fox, and Miami–Illinois).

== Examples ==
=== English ===
In certain accents, such as Geordie (among younger women) Watt & Allen (2003:268) and in some speakers of Dublin English word- and utterance-final /p, t, k/ can be preaspirated.

=== Faroese ===
Some examples of preaspirated plosives and affricates from Faroese (where they occur only after stressed vowels):

- klappa [ˈkʰlaʰpːa], 'clap'
- hattur [ˈhaʰtːʊɹ], 'hat'
- takka [ˈtʰaʰkːa], 'thank'
- søkkja [ˈsœʰt͡ʃːa], 'sink' (transitive)

Furthermore, the dialects of Vágar, northern Streymoy and Eysturoy also have ungeminated preaspirated plosives and affricates (except after close vowels/diphthongs):

- apa [ˈɛaːʰpa], 'ape', but: vípa [ˈvʊiːpa], 'northern lapwing'
- eta [ˈeːʰta], 'eat', but: hiti [ˈhiːtɪ], 'heat'
- vøka [ˈvøːʰka], 'wake', but: húka [ˈhʉuːka], to 'squat'
- høkja [ˈhøːʰt͡ʃa], 'crutch', but: vitja [ˈviːt͡ʃa], to 'visit'

=== Icelandic ===
Some examples of preaspirated plosives from Icelandic:

- kappi [ˈkʰahpɪ], 'hero'
- hattur [ˈhaʰtʏr̥], 'hat'
- þakka [ˈθaʰka], 'thank'
- hætta [ˈhaiʰta], 'stop/quit'

=== Huautla Mazatec ===
In Huautla Mazatec, preaspirates can occur word-initially, perhaps uniquely among languages which contain preaspirates:

- [ʰti] - 'fish'
- [ʰtse] - 'a sore'
- [ʰtʃi] - 'small'
- [ʰka] - 'stubble'

=== Sami languages ===
Preaspiration in the Sami languages occurs on word-medial voiceless stops and affricates of all places of articulation available: /p/, /t̪/, /t͡s/, /t͡ɕ/, /k/. In the Western Sami languages (Southern, Ume, Pite, Lule and Northern) as well as Skolt Sami, preaspiration affects both long and half-long consonants; in most Eastern Sami languages (Akkala, Kildin and Ter) only fully long consonants are preaspirated. This likely represents two waves of innovation: an early preaspiration of long consonants dating back to Proto-Sami, followed by a secondary preaspiration of half-long consonants that originated in the Western Sami area and spread eastwards to Skolt Sami.

In several Sami languages, preaspirated stops/affricates contrast with lax voiceless stops, either due to denasalization of earlier clusters (e.g. *nt > [d̥ː]) or in connection to consonant gradation.

=== Scottish Gaelic ===
In Scottish Gaelic, preaspiration is phonemic in medial and final positions after stressed vowels, due to the historical loss of voiced stops.

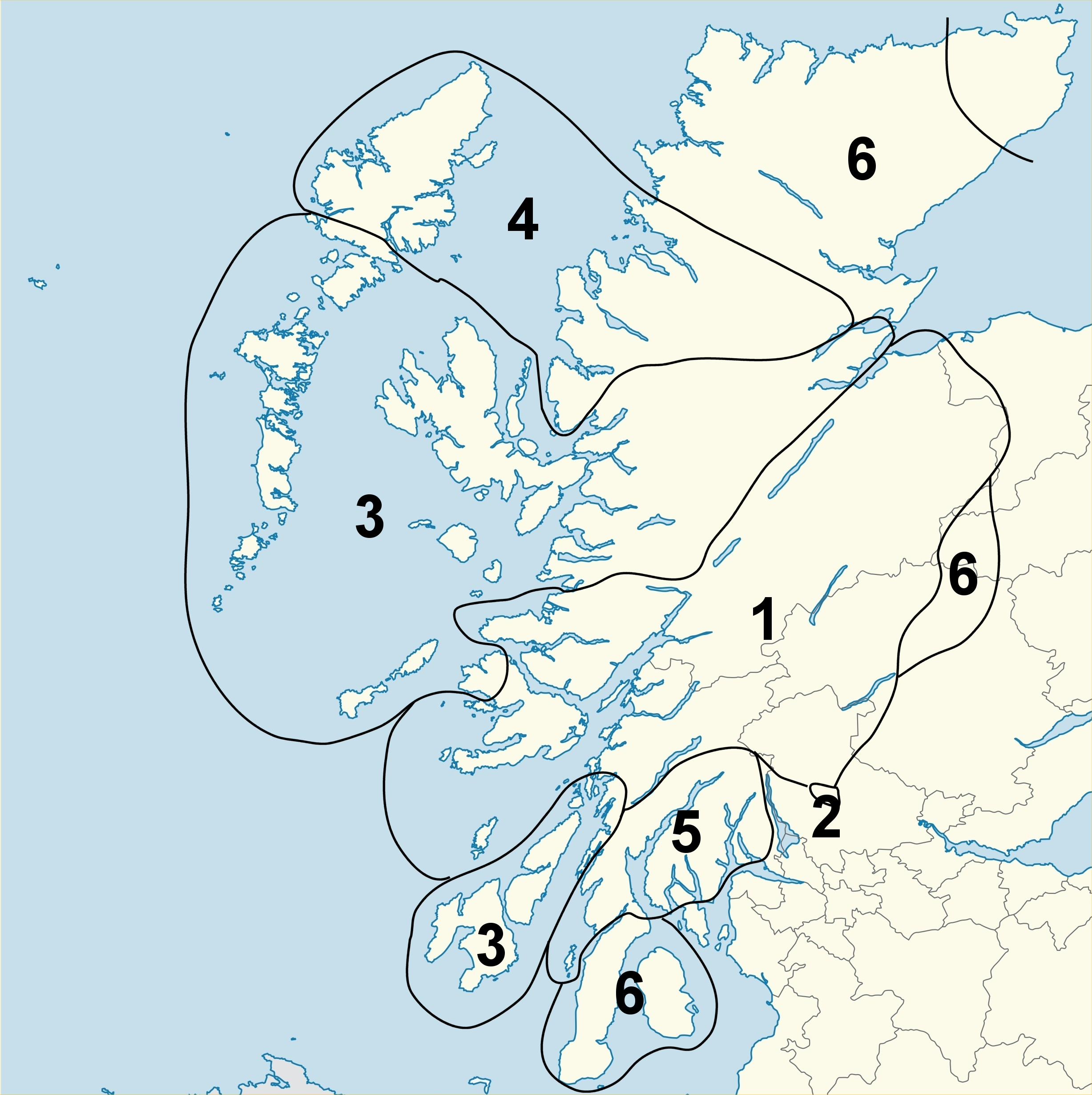
The approximate distribution of preaspiration in Gaelic dialects

Its strength varies from area to area and can manifest itself as [ʰ] or [h] or in areas with strong preaspiration as [ç] or [x]. The occurrence of preaspiration follows a hierarchy of c > t > p; i.e. if a dialect has preaspiration with p, it will also have it in the other places of articulation. Preaspiration manifests itself as follows:

- Area 1 as [xk xt xp] and [çkʲ çtʲ çp]
- Area 2 as [xk xt hp] and [çkʲ çtʲ hp]
- Area 3 as [xk ht hp] and [çkʲ htʲ hp]
- Area 4 as [ʰk ʰt ʰp]
- Area 5 as [xk] and [çkʲ] (no preaspiration of t and p)
- Area 6 no preaspiration

There are numerous minimal pairs:

- glag [kl̪ˠak] "clock" vs glac [kl̪ˠaxk] "grab" (v.)
- ad [at̪] "hat" vs at [aʰt̪] "boil" (n.)
- leag [ʎɛk] "throw down" vs leac [ʎɛxk] "flagstone"
- aba [ˈapə] "abbot" vs apa [ˈaʰpə] "ape" (n.)

== H-clusters ==
Although distinguishing preaspirated consonants from clusters of /h/ and a voiceless consonant can be difficult, the reverse does not hold: there are numerous languages such as Arabic or Finnish where such clusters are unanimously considered to constitute consonant clusters.

== See also ==
- Aspiration
- Prevoicing
- Index of phonetics articles
- Phonation
