= Samica =

Samica may refer to:

- Samica (periodical)
- Samica (musical instrument)
