= Proto-Sámi language =

Reconstructed ancestor of the Sámi languages

Proto-Sámi
- Reconstruction of: Sámi languages
- Reconstructed ancestor: Proto-Uralic

Proto-Sámi is the hypothetical, reconstructed common ancestor of the Sámi languages. Its reconstructed ancestor is the Proto-Uralic language.

== Homeland and expansion ==
Proto-Sámi descends from Proto-Uralic. Finnic languages and Sámi languages are currently geographically adjacent and coexisting in the same areas. However, whether or not they are linguistically closely related is disputed. That is, the validity of a separate grouping of "Finno-Sámic languages" is not universally accepted and the existence of a separate "Proto-Finno-Sámic language" as parent language of Proto-Sámic is uncertain. Valter Lang (of University of Tartu) posits that the Baltic Finns and the Sámi were already separate linguistic groups before they left the Uralic core area, and arrived to Fennoscandia via different routes. The Sámi entered Fennoscandia from the east or southeast. In contrast, Baltic Finns took a southern route from the Daugava river (in today's Latvia) to northern Estonia and over the sea into western Finland. This makes a separately developed Finno-Sámic language chronologically untenable. Instead, if the Finno-Sámic group existed, it was at best a group of western Proto-Uralic dialects, not a separately language.

Although the current Sámi languages are spoken much further to the north and west, Proto-Sámi was likely spoken in the area of modern-day Southwestern Finland around the first few centuries CE. Local (in Sápmi) ancestors of the modern Sámi people likely still spoke non-Uralic, "Paleoeuropean" languages at this point (see Pre-Finno-Ugric substrate). This situation can be traced in placenames as well as through the analysis of loanwords from Germanic, Baltic, and Finnic. Evidence also can be found for the existence of language varieties closely related to but likely distinct from Sámi proper having been spoken further east, with a limit around Lake Beloye.

There is abundant toponymic evidence of Sámi settlement in even the southern parts of Finland, and the Sámi coexisted with Finns and Swedes in southern Finland as late as the 14th century. Separation of the main branches (West Sámi and East Sámi) is also likely to have occurred in southern Finland, with these later independently spreading north into Sápmi. The exact routes of this are not clear: it is possible Western Sámi entered Scandinavia across Kvarken rather than via land. Concurrently, Finnic languages that would eventually end up becoming modern-day Finnish and Karelian were being adopted in the southern end of the Proto-Sámi area, likely in connection with the introduction of agriculture, a process that continued until the 19th century, leading to the extirpation of original Sámi languages in Karelia and all but northernmost Finland.

== Phonology ==
=== Consonants ===
The Proto-Sámi consonant inventory is mostly faithfully retained from Proto-Uralic, and is considerably smaller than what is typically found in modern Sámi languages. There were 16 contrastive consonants, most of which could however occur both short and geminate:

	Bilabial	Dental	Alveolar	Palatal(ized)	Velar
Stops and affricates	*p /p/ *pp /ʰpː/	*t /t̪/ *tt /ʰt̪ː/	*c /t͡s/ *cc /ʰt͡sː/	*ć /t͡ɕ/ *ćć /ʰt͡ɕː/	*k /k/ *kk /ʰkː/
Nasals	*m /m/ *mm /mː/	*n /n̪/ *nn /n̪ː/		*ń /ɲ/	*ŋ /ŋ/
Fricatives		*δ /ð/	*s /s/ *ss /sː/	*ś /ɕ/ *śś /ɕː/	
Approximants	*v /ʋ/ *vv /ʋː/		*l /l/ *ll /lː/	*j /j/ *jj /jː/	
Trill			*r /r/ *rr /rː/		

Stop and affricate consonants were split in three main allophones with respect to phonation:

- Plain voiceless [p], [t], [ts] etc., occurred word-initially, adjacent to other voiceless consonants, and in the strong grade of single intervocalic consonants
- Lax voiceless [b̥], [d̥], [d̥z̥] etc., occurred between voiced sounds
- Preaspirated [ʰpː], [ʰtː], [ʰtsː] etc., occurred in geminates

The spirant *δ also had two allophones, voiceless [θ] occurring word-initially and syllable-finally, and voiced [ð] elsewhere.

==== Consonant gradation ====
A detailed system of allophony is reconstructible, known as consonant gradation. Gradation applied to all intervocalic single consonants as well as all consonant clusters. This is unlike gradation in the related Proto-Finnic and its descendants, where it applied only to a subset. The conditioning factor was the same, however: the weak grade occurred if the following syllable was closed, the strong grade if it was open. This difference was originally probably realized as length:

- A single consonant was short in the weak grade, e.g. [s], half-long in the strong grade [sˑ]
- A geminate consonant was long [sː] in the weak grade, overlong [sːː] in the strong grade
- A consonant cluster had a short 1st member in the weak grade, e.g. [sm], a half-long one in the strong grade, [sˑm]

Gradation only applied after a stressed syllable; after an unstressed syllable all medial consonants appeared in the weak grade.

In sources on Proto-Sámi reconstruction, gradation is often assumed but not indicated graphically. In this article, when it is relevant and necessary to show the distinction, the weak grade is denoted with an inverted breve below the consonant(s): s : s̯, č : č̯, tt : t̯t̯, lk : l̯k̯.

After the phonematization of gradation due to loss of word-final sounds, Sámi varieties could be left with as many as four different contrastive degrees of consonant length. This has only been attested in some dialects of Ume Sámi. Most other Sámi varieties phonemically merged the weak grade of geminates with the strong grade of single consonants, leaving only three lengths. In some Sámi languages, other sound developments have left only two or three degrees occurring elsewhere.

=== Vowels ===
An asymmetric system of four short and five long vowel segments can be reconstructed.

Short vowels
	Front	Back
Close	i	u
Mid		ë [ɤ], o
Open		

Long vowels
	Front	Back
Close-mid	ie	uo
Mid	ē [eː]	ō [oː]
Open-mid	ea	oa
Open	ā [aː]	

- The four diphthongs *ie *ea *oa *uo only occurred in stressed syllables, in complementary distribution with the two long vowels *ē *ō occurring in unstressed syllables.
- *ā did not generally occur in the last syllable of a word.

=== Prosody ===
Stress was not phonemic in Proto-Sámi. The first syllable of a word invariably received primary stress. Non-initial syllables of a word received secondary stress, according to a trochaic pattern of alternating secondarily-stressed and unstressed syllables. Odd-numbered syllables (counting from the start) were stressed, while even-numbered syllables were unstressed. The last syllable of a word was never stressed. Thus, a word could end in either a stressed syllable followed by an unstressed syllable (if the last syllable was even-numbered) or a stressed syllable followed by two unstressed syllables (if the last syllable was odd-numbered). This gave the following pattern, which could be extended indefinitely (P = primary stress, S = secondary stress, _ = no stress):

- P
- P _
- P _ _
- P _ S _
- P _ S _ _
- P _ S _ S _
- etc.

Because the four diphthongs could only occur in stressed syllables, and consonant gradation only occurred after a stressed syllable, this stress pattern led to alternations between vowels in different forms of the same word. These alternations survive in many Sámi languages in the form of distinct inflectional classes, with words with a stressed second-last syllable following the so-called "even" or "two-syllable" inflection, and words with an unstressed second-last syllable following the "odd" or "three-syllable" inflection. Weakening and simplification of non-final consonants after unstressed syllables contributed further to the alternation, leading to differences that are sometimes quite striking. For example:

Form	Even-syllable stem "to live"			Odd-syllable stem "to answer"		
Form	Proto-Sámi	Northern Sámi	Skolt Sámi	Proto-Sámi	Northern Sámi	Skolt Sámi
Infinitive	*ealē-t̯ēk	ealli-t	jiẹˊlle-d	*vāstē-tē-t̯ēk	vásti-di-t	vaˊst-tee-d
First-person singular present indicative	*eal̯ā-m	ealá-n	jiẹˊlla-m	*vāstē-t̯ā-m	vásti-da-n	vaˊst-tää-m
First-person singular conditional	*eal̯ā-k̯ć̯i-m	ealá-ši-n	jiẹˊll-če-m	*vāstē-t̯ie-k̯ć̯i-m	vásti-dī-včče-n	vaˊst-teˊ-če-m
First-person singular potential	*eal̯ē-ń̯ć̯ë-m	ēle-ža-n	jiẹˊll-že-m	*vāstē-t̯ea-ń̯ć̯ë-m	vásti-dea-čča-n	vaˊst-teˊ-že-m

In compounds, which consisted of a combination of several root words, each word retained the stress pattern that it had in isolation, so that that stress remained lexically significant (i.e. could theoretically distinguish compounds from non-compounds). The first syllable of the first part of a compound had the strongest stress, with progressively weaker secondary stress for the first syllables of the remaining parts.

== Grammar ==
=== Nominals ===
Nominals, i.e. nouns, adjectives, numerals and pronouns were systematically inflected for two numbers and ten cases. The personal pronouns and possessive suffixes also distinguished the dual number.

==== Cases ====
The cases included the core cases nominative, accusative and genitive; the local cases inessive, elative, illative; as well as essive, partitive, comitative, and abessive.

Case	Singular ending	Plural ending	Meaning/use
Nominative	∅	*-k	Subject, object of imperative
Accusative	*-m	*-jtē	Object
Partitive	*-tē	*-jtē	Partial object, motion away
Genitive	*-n	*-j	Possession, relation
Essive	*-nē	*-jnē	Being, acting as
Inessive	*-snē	*-jnē	Being at, on, inside
Elative	*-stē	*-jstē	Motion from, off, out of
Illative	*-s̯ën	*-jtēs̯ën (N) *-jtē (S) *-j̯t̯ën (In)	Motion towards, to, onto, into
Comitative	*-jnē *-jnë (In, Lu)	*-j (+ *kuojmē)	With, in company of, by means of
Abessive	*-ptāk̯ëk	-	Without, lacking

The case system shows some parallel developments with the Finnic languages. Like Finnic, the original Uralic locative *-na was repurposed as an essive, the ablative case *-ta became the partitive, and new locative cases were formed from these by infixing *-s-. Sámi lacks any equivalent to the Finnic "external" cases beginning with *-l-, however. Moreover, the earliest stages of Sámic appear to have used these cases only in the singular, as several of the singular cases do not have a formational counterpart in the plural:

- The accusative plural developed out of the original ablative/partitive plural form, with plural infix -j- + partitive -ta.
- The inessive plural is the original essive plural form, with plural infix -j- + locative -na.
- The illative plural was formed in different ways in the various languages, so that no single form can be reconstructed for Proto-Sámic.
- The elative plural was likely formed relatively late as well, as it shows a three-consonant cluster, formed analogically by adding the plural -j- to the singular form.
- The comitative plural was in origin a periphrastic construction consisting of the genitive plural with the noun *kuojmē "companion".

Given the discrepancies in the plural locative cases, it is likely that this part of the case system was still partially in development during the late Proto-Sámi period, and developed in subtly different ways in the various descendants. In most Sámi languages, the case system has been simplified:

- The partitive has been lost in most western languages.
- In several languages the genitive and accusative singular have coincided, and in Northern Sámi this led to an analogical merger in the plural. Southern and Pite Sámi still keep the two cases separate.
- A sound change *sn > *st that occurred in the history of several mostly eastern Sámi languages caused a merging of the inessive and elative singular, creating a single "locative" case. Several languages merged the plural cases analogically, but some languages chose the former inessive plural form, while others chose the elative plural.

==== Possession ====
Proto-Sámi possessive suffixes
Case	Person	Number		
Case	Person	Singular	Dual	Plural
Nominative	1st	*-më	*-mën	*-mēk
Nominative	2nd	*-të	*-tën	*-tēk
Nominative	3rd	*-sē	*-sēn	*-sēk
Accusative	1st	*-më	*-mën	*-mēk
Accusative	2nd	*-mtë	*-mtën	*-mtēk
Accusative	3rd	*-msē	*-msēn	*-msēk
Oblique	1st	*-në	*-nën	*-nēk
Oblique	2nd	*-ntë	*-ntën	*-ntēk
Oblique	3rd	*-ssē	*-ssēn	*-ssēk

=== Verb inflection ===
	Present indicative	Past indicative	Imperative/ optative
1st singular	*-m	*-jëm	*-(k)ōmë
2nd singular	*-k	*-jëk	*-k
3rd singular	*-∅	*-j	*-(k)ōsē
1st dual	*-jēn	*-jmën	*-(k)ōmën
2nd dual	?	*-jtën	*-(kē)tēn
3rd dual	*-pēn	*-jkV- (West) *-jnën (In)	*-(k)ōsēn
1st plural	*-pē	*-jmēk	*-(k)ōmēk
2nd plural	?	*-jtēk	*-(kē)tēk
3rd plural	*-jēk	?	*-(k)ōsēk
Connegative	*-k	-	*-k

- The conditional mood had the mood marker *-kćē- (cognate to the Estonian conditional marker -ks-), to which past tense endings were attached. In Western Sámi, a new conditional mood was innovated, consisting of the connegative form of the verb joined to a past-tense form of the copula *leatēk.
- The potential mood had the mood marker *-ńćë- (cognate to the Finnish conditional marker -isi-). It received present-tense endings.

The following non-finite forms were also present:

- Infinitive *-tēk, identical with the Finnic ending *-dak.
- Verbal noun *-mē, identical with the Finnic verbal noun suffix *-ma.
- Present participle *-jē, originally an agent noun suffix, cognate to the Finnic agent noun suffix *-ja.
- Past participle *-më or extended *-mëńćë. The extended form is identical with the Finnish verbal noun/"fourth infinitive" suffix *-minen ~ *-mice-.

== Lexicon ==
The vocabulary reconstructible for Proto-Sámi has been catalogued by Lehtiranta (1989), who records approximately 1500 word roots for which either a pre-Sámi ancestry is assured, or whose distribution across the Sámi languages reaches at least from Lule Sámi to Skolt Sámi. Later work has increased the number of reconstructed words to 3421.

Within this sample, loanwords from the Finnic and North Germanic languages already constitute major subsets of the language with 24% of the 3421 root words coming from North Germanic. One oddity is that the plurality of words, 35% are of uncertain origin, likely from a theorized group of languages called Proto-Laplandic.

Words describing natural elements such as reindeer or snow tend to be of unknown origin whereas those for more modern things such as tools contain larger Germanic influence.

== Development ==
=== From Proto-Uralic ===
- *a followed by *i > *o followed by *a.
- *ï > *a, a change shared with the Finnic and Mordvinic languages. This change counterfeeds the previous one.
- *ü > *i.
- Loss of vowel harmony (if it existed). In non-initial syllables, front, and back harmonic allophones collapsed into one: *ï > *i and *ä > *a.
- *δ́ > *δ, a development also shared with Finnic and Mordvinic.
- *č, *š > *c, *s
- Vowels are lengthened before *x.
- *ś, *x > *ć, *k before a vowel. *x is lost elsewhere.
- *ns > *ss
- *sj > *šš
- *kj, *kl, *kń > *vj, *vl, *vń

This approximate point of Pre-Sámi marks the introduction of the oldest Western Indo-European loanwords from Baltic and Germanic. Loans were also acquired from its southern relative Finnic, substituting the early Finnic sound *š with Sámi *ś. Likely contemporary to these were the oldest loanwords adapted from extinct Paleo-European substrate languages during the northwestward expansion of Pre-Sámi. Prime suspects for words of this origin include replacements of Uralic core vocabulary, or words that display consonant clusters that cannot derive from either PU or any known Indo-European source. A number of the later type can be found in the Finnic languages as well.

Examples:

- PU *śečä > preS *ćeca > PS *ćeacē 'uncle'
- PU *δ́ümä > preS *δima > PS *δëmē 'glue'
- PU *kïnta > preS *kanto(j) > PS *kuontōj 'tree stump'
- PU *mexi- > preS *mēki- > PS *miekë- 'to sell'
- Baltic *šalna → preS *salna > PS *suolnē 'frost'
- Germanic *raudaz 'red' → preS *rawta > PS *ruovtē 'iron'
- Germanic *hansa- → preS *kansa > PS *kuossē 'guest'
- Finnic *pošja → preS *pośja > PS *poaśśē 'rear'
- substrate? → preS *keðka > PS *keaðkē 'rock', in place of Uralic *kiwi
- substrate? → preS *mori or *mari > PS *muorë "wood", in place of Uralic *puwï or *puxï
- substrate? → preS *ašŋVn > PS *vuosŋōn 'perch' (cf. Finnish ahven)
- substrate? → preS *šewšim > PS *sëvsëm 'feather' (cf. Finnish höyhen)

Later consonant changes mostly involved the genesis of the consonant gradation system, but also the simplification of various consonant clusters, chiefly in loanwords.

- Geminate fricatives *ss, *śś were introduced in certain loanwords.
- *ŋ was denasalized before a heterorganic obstruent.
  - PU *joŋsə → PS *juoksë 'bow'
  - PU *oŋtə → PS *vuovtë 'cavity'

==== Vowel shift ====
A fairly late but major development within Sámi was a complete upheaval of the vowel system, which has been compared in scope to the Great Vowel Shift of English.

The previous changes left a system consisting of *i *e *ä *a *o *u in the first syllable in Pre-Sámi, and probably at least long *ī *ē *ū. In unstressed syllables, only *i *a *o were distinguished. The source of *o is unclear, although it is frequently also found in Finnic.

The table below shows the main correspondences:

Stressed syllables
Pre-Sámi	Proto-Sámi
i	ë
ī	i
e	ea, ë (...ë)
ē	ea, ie (...ë)
ä (ǟ?)	ā, ie (...ë)
a (ā?)	uo
o (ō?)	oa, uo (...ë), rarely o (...ë)
u	o
ū	u

Unstressed syllables
Pre-Sámi	Proto-Sámi
i	ë
a	ē, i (...j), ā (...ë)
o	ō, u (...ë)

The processes that added up to this shift can be outlined as follows:

1. Lowering: *i *u > *ɪ *ʊ, including unstressed *i.
2. Raising: *e > *ɪ before a following *ɪ. There are also irregular examples with *o > *ʊ (for example *kolmi 'three' > *kʊlmi > Proto-Sámi *kolmë > Northern Sámi golbma).
3. All non-close vowels are lengthened: *e *ä *a *o > *ē *ǟ *ā *ō. If earlier long non-close vowels existed, they were merged with their short counterparts by this time.

At this point, the vowel system consisted of only two short vowels *ɪ *ʊ in initial syllables, alongside the full complement of long vowels *ī *ē *ǟ *ā *ō *ū. In non-initial syllables, the vowels were *ɪ *ā *ō. After this, several metaphonic changes then occurred that rearranged the distribution of long vowels in stressed syllables.

- *ē *ǟ *ō > *ɛ̄ *ā *ɔ̄ before *ā and *ō. This may indicate that second-syllable *ō was a relatively open vowel such as [ɔː].
- *ǟ *ā > *ē *ō before *ɪ.
- *ā > *ō also elsewhere.

Sammallahti (1998:182–183) suggests the following four phases:

1. Lowering of mid vowels before *ā and *ō.
2. Raising of open vowels before *ɪ, merging with the un-lowered mid vowels.
3. Raising of remaining *ā.
4. Backing of remaining *ǟ.

The inventory of long vowels in stressed syllables now featured seven members: *ī *ē *ɛ̄ *ā *ɔ̄ *ō *ū. However, in native vocabulary *ē *ɛ̄ remained in complementary distribution: the closed-mid vowel only occurred before following *ɪ, the open-mid vowel only before following *ā, *ō.

Further changes then shifted the sound values of the unstressed syllables that had conditioned the above shift:

1. *āj > *īj, regardless of following vowels.
2. *ā > *ē, unless followed by *ɪ in a third or later syllable.
3. *ō > *ū before *ɪ.

Lastly, a number of unconditional shifts adjusted the sound values of the vowel phonemes.

1. *ē *ɛ̄ *ɔ̄ *ō > *ie *ea *oa *uo, in initial syllables. Word initially, *ie *uo > *jie *vuo.
2. *ɪ *ʊ > *ë *o. There likely was an intermediate *e for the first of these.
3. *ī *ū > *i *u.

To what extent the two last changes should be dated to Proto-Sámi proper is unclear. Although all Sámi languages show these changes in at least some words, in Southern Sámi and Ume Sámi earlier *ī, *ɪ, *ʊ, *ū are regularly reflected as ij, i, u, uv in stressed open syllables. It is possible that these are archaisms, and shortening and lowering occurred only after the initial division of Proto-Sámi into dialects. The effects of the vowel shift can be illustrated by the following comparison between Northern Sámi, and Finnish, known for retaining vowel values very close to Proto-Uralic. All word pairs correspond to each other regularly:

(Post-)Proto-Uralic	Proto-Sámi	Northern Sámi	Finnish	Translation
*kixi-	*kikë-	gihkat	kii-ma	PU, PS, NS: 'to rut' Fi: 'heat'
*nimi	*nëmë	namma	nimi	'name'
*weri	*vërë	varra	veri	'blood'
*mexi-	*miekë-	Skolt Sámi: miõkkâd	myydä, myödä	'to sell'
*käti	*kietë	giehta	käsi	'hand'
*polwï	*puolvë	buolva	polvi	'knee'
*elä-	*ealē-	eallit	elää	'to live'
*äjmä	*ājmē	ájbmi	äimä	'large needle'
*kala	*kuolē	guolli	kala	'fish'
*kalanï	*kuolānë	guollán	kalani	'my fish'
*wolka	*oalkē	oalgi	olka	'shoulder'
*wolkajta	*oalkijtē	olggiid	olkia	'of shoulders'
*muδa	*moδē	mođđi	muta	'mud'
*suxi-	*sukë-	suhkat	sou-taa	'to row'

=== Towards the modern Sámi languages ===
The main division among the Sámi languages is the split between eastern and western Sámi.

Changes that appear across the Eastern-Western divide are:

- Denasalisation of clusters of nasal plus homorganic consonant to geminate voiced or partially voiced stops (all except Akkala, Kildin and Ter Sámi). This appears to have originally been a Western Sámi innovation that then spread to Inari and Skolt Sámi, as it was still productive in those languages after the borrowing of certain words that escaped the process in Western Sámi. For example, Finnish anteeksi was borrowed into Northern Sámi as ándagassii after the change, thus with a newly introduced nasal, while Inari Sámi has addâgâs, borrowed before the change and thus lacking the nasal.
- Preaspiration of single stops and affricates (all except Akkala, Kildin and Ter Sámi).
- Development of the rare phoneme *θ to *t word-initially. Southern Sámi and Ume Sámi have *h instead.
- Deaffrication of *c and *č before another consonant. This change occurred in a large area in the middle of the Sámi area, with the outliers Southern, Akkala, Kildin, Ter and partly also Skolt Sámi preserving the original affricates.

==== Western Sámi ====
Innovations common to the Western Sámi languages:

- Pre-stopped or pre-glottalised nasals develop from original geminate nasals (not in Sea Sámi).
- Vocalisation of *š to *j before a stop (not in Sea Sámi).
- Metathesis and fortition of *ŋv to *vk.
- Assimilation of *ŋm to *mm, which then becomes pre-stopped/pre-glottalised.
- Merging of clusters of stop plus homorganic nasal with single nasals.

The Southern West Sámi languages consist of Southern Sámi and Ume Sámi, and have a number of further innovations:

- Lengthening of short syllables, either by lengthening stressed *i *u to /ij uv/ in open syllables, or geminating single consonants after other short vowels.
- Stressed *ë *o are raised to /i u/ in open syllables (in Ume Sámi only if the next vowel is not *ë).
- Reduction of consonant gradation. It is only partly present in Ume Sámi, and entirely lost in Southern Sámi.

The Northern West Sámi languages consist of Pite Sámi, Lule Sámi, and Northern Sámi. They have one important common innovation:

- Pre-stopped or pre-glottalised nasals develop also from strong-grade single nasals (not in Sea Sámi).

Pite Sámi and Lule Sámi form their own smaller subgroup of shared innovations, which might be termed Northwestern West Sámi:

- 2nd syllable *ë is assimilated to /o/ after 1st syllable /o/.
- The distinction between single and geminate stops (*p *pp etc.) is neutralized after the liquids /l/, /r/.

Northern Sámi by itself has its own unique changes:

- Change of *p to *k in clusters before a stop or sibilant.
- Merging of accusative and genitive cases.
- Merging of the inessive into the elative to form a common locative case, with the ending used depending on dialect.
- Loss of the past tense of the negative verb, in favour of a construction using the present tense of the negative verb with the past participle (like Finnish).

==== Eastern Sámi ====
The Eastern Sámi languages have the following innovations:

- Contraction of syllables before *nč.
- Development of ŋ to v before another labial sonorant.
- Merging of clusters of stop plus homorganic nasal with geminate nasals.

The Mainland East Sámi languages, Inari Sámi, Skolt Sámi, and Akkala Sámi, share further innovations:

- Gemination of *s *ś *c *ć *k even in the weak grade.
- Merging of unstressed *u with *ɔ̄.

Skolt and Akkala Sámi moreover share:

- Loss of final unstressed vowels.
- Merging of *ɔ̄ with *ā.
- Development of stressed *i *u to /e o/ under certain conditions.

Peninsular East (Kola) Sámi, consisting of Kildin Sámi and Ter Sámi, share:

- Loss of *t after a consonant between unstressed syllables.

==== Overview ====
Feature	South	Ume	Pite	Lule	North	Inari	Skolt	Akkala	Kildin	Ter	Notes
*ë	i, e, a		a, o		a (o, e)	a		ë			
*θ-	h		t								
*k̯C̯	kC			vC	vC (ɣC)	vC					Weak grade of clusters *k̯t̯, *k̯c̯, *k̯ć̯, *k̯s̯, *k̯ś̯
*śC	jhC				jhC (śC)	śC					Clusters *śn, *śt, *śk
*cC *ćC	cC ćC	sC śC					cC (sC) ćC (śC)	cC ćC			Clusters *ck, *ćk, *ćm
*ŋv	*vg̊					vv					
*ŋm	*mː → ʔm				ʔm (mː)	vm					
*N̯N̯	ʔN				ʔN (Nː)	Nː					Weak grade of original geminate nasals
*N	Nː	(ʔN)	ʔN		ʔN (Nː)	Nː					Strong grade of original single nasals
*PN	N		ʔN		ʔN (Nː)	Nː					Clusters *pm, *tn
*rN	rN		rhN		rʔN, rhN	rN					
*NP	BB					BB		NB			Homorganic clusters *mp, *nt, *nc, *ńć, *ŋk
*mP	b̥B (mB)	b̥B			vB	b̥B		mB			Heterorganic clusters *mt, *mć, *mk
*nm, *mn	BN (NN)	BN				NN					
*P	ʰPː							Pː			Strong grade of original single stops and affricates
*Cˑ	Cː	Cː (Cˑ)	Cː								?

Reflexes in parentheses are retentions found in certain subdialects. In particular, in the coastal dialects of North Sámi (known as Sea Sámi), several archaisms have been attested, including a lack of pre-stopping of geminate nasals, a lack of *ś-vocalization, and a reflex /e/ of *ë in certain positions. These likely indicate an earlier Eastern Sámi substratum.

==== Umlaut ====
In the history of Proto-Sámi, some sound changes were triggered or prevented by the nature of the vowel in the next syllable. Such changes continued to occur in the modern Sámi languages, but differently in each. Due to the similarity with Germanic umlaut, these phenomena are termed "umlaut" as well.

The following gives a comparative overview of each possible Proto-Sámi vowel in the first syllable, with the outcomes that are found in each language for each second-syllable vowel.

===== Long open =====
Outcomes of first-syllable *ā
Second vowel	*ā	*ō	*ē	*ë	*u	*i
Southern	aa		ae	aa	åå	ee
Ume	á				å̄	ä
Pite	á				ä	
Lule	á					
Northern	á					
Inari	á		ä	a		
Skolt	ä		äʹ	a		aʹ
Kildin	а̄			оа		

===== Long open-mid =====
Outcomes of first-syllable *ea
Second vowel	*ā	*ō	*ē	*ë	*u	*i
Southern	ea		ie	ïe	yö	ee
Ume	eä, iä		eä, ie	eä, iä	yö	ē
Pite	ä, ie				e	
Lule	ä		ie	ä, e		
Northern	ea				ē	
Inari	iä		e			
Skolt	eä		eäʹ, iẹʹ	iâ		ieʹ
Kildin	я̄		е̄	е̄	ӣ	

Outcomes of first-syllable *oa
Second vowel	*ā	*ō	*ē	*ë	*u	*i
Southern	åa		åe	oe	åå	öö
Ume	å̄				ū	ǖ
Pite	å̄				ū	
Lule	oa			oa, å̄		
Northern	oa				ō	
Inari	uá			o		
Skolt	uä		uäʹ, uẹʹ	uå		ueʹ
Kildin	уа		уэ	о̄	ӯ	

- In Ume Sámi, eä appears before a quantity 3 consonant, iä or ie before a quantity 1 or 2 consonant.
- In Pite Sámi, ä appears before a quantity 3 consonant, ie before a quantity 1 or 2 consonant.
- In Lule Sámi, ä and oa appear before a quantity 3 consonant, e and å̄ before a quantity 1 or 2 consonant, if a short vowel follows.
- In Skolt Sámi, iẹʹ and uẹʹ appear before a quantity 2 consonant, eäʹ and uäʹ otherwise.

===== Long close-mid =====
Outcomes of first-syllable *ie
Second vowel	*ā	*ō	*ē	*ë	*u	*i
Southern	ea		ie	ïe	yö	?
Ume	eä, iä		eä, ie	eä, iä	yö	ē
Pite	ä, ie				e	
Lule	ie					
Northern	ie				ī	
Inari	iä		ie			
Skolt	eâ		ieʹ	iõ		iõʹ
Kildin		е̄		ӣ		

Outcomes of first-syllable *uo
Second vowel	*ā	*ō	*ē	*ë	*u	*i
Southern	ua	åa	ue	oe	åå	öö
Ume	ua		uö	ua	ū	ue
Pite	ua, uo		uä, uo	ua, uo	ū	
Lule	uo					
Northern	uo				ū	
Inari	uá		ye	uo		
Skolt	uâ		ueʹ	uõ		uõʹ
Kildin	уэ		ӯ, ы	ӯ		ӯ

- In Ume Sámi, eä appears before a quantity 3 consonant, iä before a quantity 1 or 2 consonant. Some dialects have a pattern more like Pite Sámi, with ua or uä before a quantity 3 consonant, and uo or uö before a quantity 1 or 2 consonant.
- In Pite Sámi, ä and ua or uä appear before a quantity 3 consonant, ie and uo before a quantity 1 or 2 consonant.
- In Lule Sámi, original *ie does not undergo umlaut by regular sound change, but almost all e-stems have acquired umlaut by analogy with original *ea, as the two vowels fall together before original *ē.

===== Short mid =====
Outcomes of first-syllable *ë
Second vowel	*ā	*ō	*ē	*ë	*u	*i
Southern	a	ä, å	e	a, ï	o	e
Ume	a				å	e
Pite	a				i	
Lule	a					
Northern	a					
Inari	a			o		
Skolt	â		âʹ	õ		õʹ
Kildin	а			э̄, э		э̄, э

Outcomes of first-syllable *o
Second vowel	*ā	*ō	*ē	*ë	*u	*i
Southern	å		u	o, a	o	u
Ume	å				u	ü
Pite	å				u	
Lule	å					
Northern	o					
Inari	o			u		
Skolt	å		åʹ	o		oʹ
Kildin	о̄	оа, о	оа, о̄	о, о̄		

===== Short close =====
Outcomes of first-syllable *i
Second vowel	*ā	*ō	*ē	*ë	*u	*i
Southern	ä, ij	ä	i	ïj	y	i
Ume	ï		i	ï	y	i
Pite	i					
Lule	i					
Northern	i					
Inari	i					
Skolt	e		eʹ	i		iʹ
Kildin	ы/и					

Outcomes of first-syllable *u
Second vowel	*ā	*ō	*ē	*ë	*u	*i
Southern	å, a	å	u	o, ov	o	u
Ume	u		ü	u		ü
Pite	u					
Lule	u					
Northern	u					
Inari	u					
Skolt	o		uʹ	u		uʹ
Kildin	у					

- In Kildin Sámi, ⟨и⟩ is written after the letter ⟨ч⟩, ⟨ы⟩ in all other cases.
