= Malå =

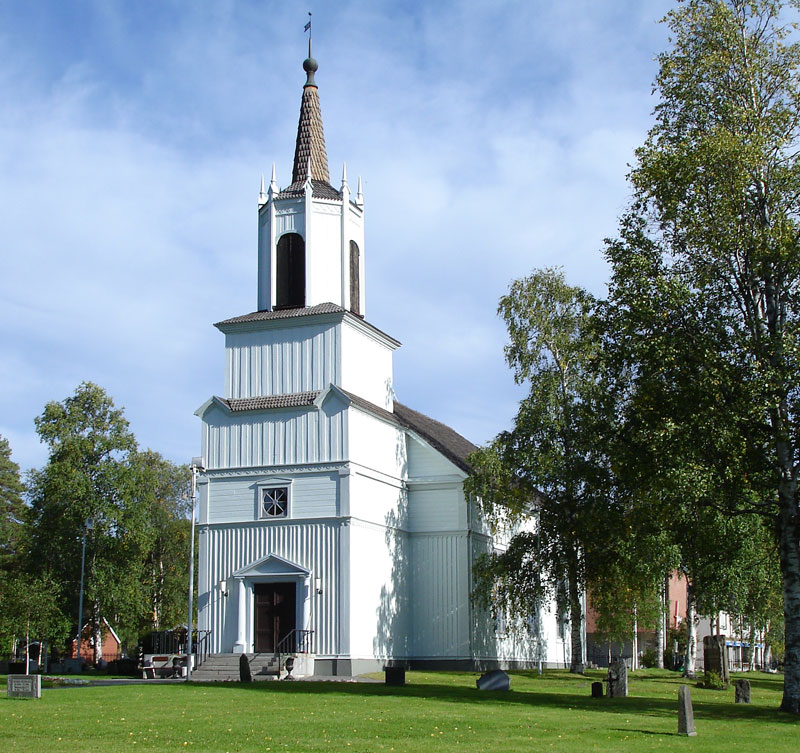
- Malå Church in August 2013

- Location within Västerbotten Location within Sweden
- Coordinates: 65°11′N 18°45′E
- Country: Sweden
- Province: Lapland
- County: Västerbotten County
- Municipality: Malå Municipality

Area
  - Total: 2.61 km^{2} (1.01 sq mi)

Population (December 31, 2010)
  - Total: 2,050
  - Density: 785/km^{2} (2,030/sq mi)
- Time zone: UTC+1 (CET)
  - Summer (DST): UTC+2 (CEST)

Malå (Ume Sami: Máláge, Southern Sami: Maalege) is a locality and the seat of Malå Municipality in Västerbotten County, province of Lapland, Sweden with 2,050 inhabitants in 2010.

== History ==
The Swedish name Malå comes from the Sami Máláge. The origin is unclear, but the word might derive from "málle," which means blood or sap. A later interpretation is that Máláge refers back to the Swedish name, which was associated with the river (Måll-ån in 1553). It has been assumed that the river's name comes from the Swedish dialect word "mal," meaning 'sand, gravel, or small stones.

Malå is the parish village in Malå parish and was part of Malå rural municipality after the municipal reform of 1862. On May 30, 1941, the Malåträsks municipal community was established for the village, which was dissolved on December 31, 1952. Between 1971 and 1974, and since 1983, the village has been part of Malå Municipality, where it is the central locality. Between 1974 and 1983, the village was part of Norsjö Municipality.

== Sports ==
The following sports clubs are located in Malå:

- Malå IF
- Malå IF Volley

== See also ==
- Forest Sami
