= Pre-Finno-Ugric substrate =

Category of words in some Uralic languages

Languages of Pre-Finno-Ugric substrate
- Region: Northern Europe
- Extinct: 1st millennium AD
- Language family: unclassified

Language codes
- ISO 639-3: None (mis)
- Glottolog: None
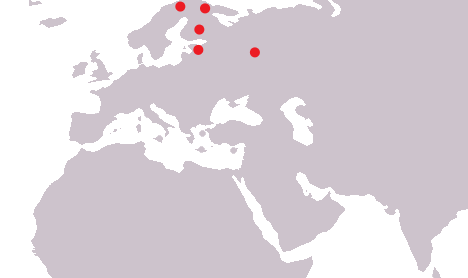
- Locations of proposed Pre-Finno-Ugric populations

Pre-Finno-Ugric substrate refers to substratum loanwords from unidentified non-Indo-European and non-Uralic languages that are found in various Finno-Ugric languages, most notably Sámi. The presence of Pre-Finno-Ugric substrate in Sámi languages was demonstrated by Ante Aikio. Janne Saarikivi points out that similar substrate words are present in Finnic languages as well, but in much smaller numbers. The proposed substrate influence in Finnic may have been related either by borrowing or a direct genetic relationship to the languages that influenced Sámi.

Borrowing to Sámi from Paleo-Laplandic probably still took place after the completion of the Great Sámi Vowel Shift. Paleo-Laplandic likely became extinct about 1500 years ago.

The Nganasan language also has many substrate words from unknown extinct languages in the Taimyr peninsula.

== Theories ==
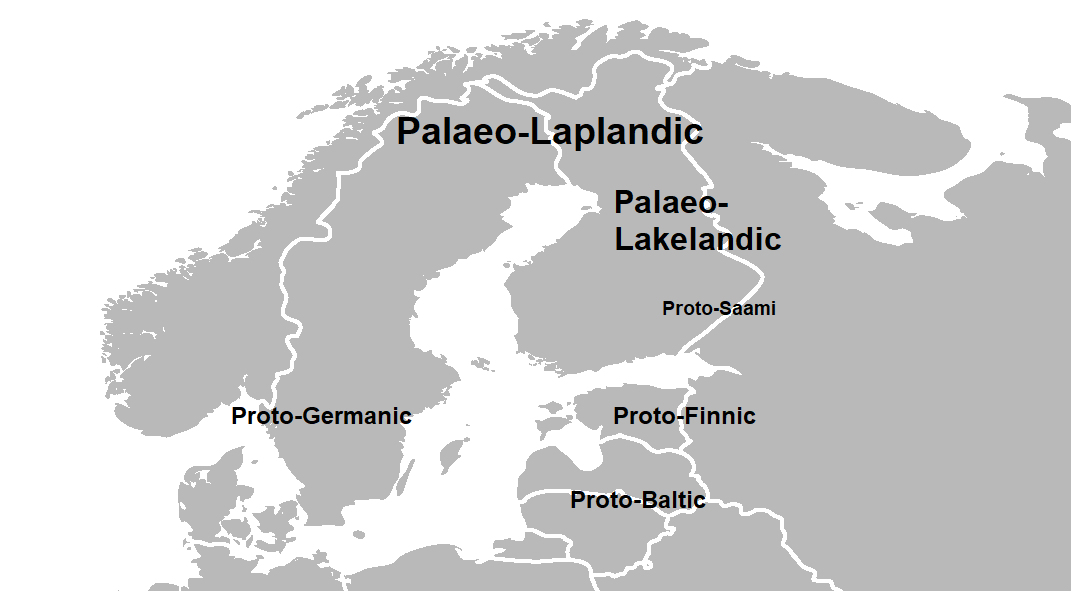
Languages of northern Europe in the early Iron Age

According to Aikio, the speakers of the Proto-Sámi language arrived in Lapland around 650 BC and fully assimilated the local Paleo-European populations by the middle of 1st millennium AD. In his opinion, the detailed reconstruction of these languages is impossible.

The languages of more eastern post-Swiderian cultures might have influenced Finno-Ugric languages as well. According to Peter Schrijver, some of these substrate languages probably had many geminated consonants. A lexical comparison with the hypothetical Pre-Germanic substratum yields no results.

=== Paleo-Laplandic ===
Paleo-Laplandic is a hypothetical group of extinct but related languages spoken in Sápmi (northern Scandinavia, traditionally known as Lapland). The speakers of Paleo-Laplandic languages switched to Sámi languages, and the languages became extinct around AD 500. A considerable amount of words in Sámi languages originate from Paleo-Laplandic; more than 1,000 loanwords from Paleo-Laplandic likely exist. Many toponyms in Sápmi originate from Paleo-Laplandic. Because Sámi language etymologies for reindeers have preserved a large number of words from Paleo-Laplandic, this suggests that Paleo-Laplandic groups influenced Sámi culture.

Paleo-Lakelandic was likely distinguished into an Eastern and a Western language group, as Eastern Sámi substrate words differ phonetically from those of Western Sámi.

Some examples of Kildin Sámi words and corresponding Northern Sámi cognates without convincing Uralic/Finno-Ugric (or any other) etymologies:

Kildin Sámi	Northern Sámi	English
кӯттҍк	-	heart
вӯнтас	-	sand
поаввьн	-	hummock
ке̄ддҍк	geađgi	stone
пӣӈӈк	biegga	wind
ке̄ттҍк	geatki	wolverine
ныгкешь	-	pike (fish)
мӯрр	muorra	tree
цӣгк	-	mist
мӯнь	-	frost
пынне	-	to herd, to look after
чӯййкэ	čuoigat	to ski
лӯһпель		1 y.o. reindeer
курас	guoros	empty
мо̄джесь		beautiful
нюччкэ	njuiket	to jump
чаццькэ	čiekčat	to throw
тӯллтэ	duoldit	to boil

Substrate words from Ante Aikio (2004)
North Sámi	English
beahcet	fish tail
cuohppa	fish meat
šákša	capelin
ája	spring
skuoggir	ethmoid bone
šuorja	giant shark
buovjag	beluga
ruomas	wolf
bákti	cliff, rock
gieva	boghole
váiši	wild animal
itku	shady place
roggi	hole
sátku	landing place
skuolfi	owl
čuovga	light
soavli	slush
gákšu	she wolf

Most of these words have cognates in all Sámi languages. A more extensive list of such words can be found in G. M. Kert's 2009 work on Sámi toponymics. Semantically, pre-Sámi substrate consists mostly of basic vocabulary terms (i.e. human body parts) and nature/animal names, and lacks terms of kinship and societal organization, which suggests a rather low level of socioeconomic development in pre-Sámi cultures.

=== Paleo-Lakelandic ===
Another group, the Paleo-Lakelandic languages, are a hypothetical group of languages similar to the Paleo-Laplandic languages which influenced the Sámi languages more South, that were later assimilated by Finnic people. Nevertheless, the Sámi substrate vocabulary in Finnish reveals many words of unknown origin which derive from the Paleo-European languages spoken in the region. Words such as *kāvë 'bend' and *šāpšë have been identified as originating in Paleo-Lakelandic.

=== Paleo-Baltic ===
The Paleo-Baltic languages are a group of languages that have been proposed to have existed in the Baltic region prior to the migrations of the Indo-Europeans and Finno-Ugrians, that have been hypothesized to have influenced the Baltic and Finnic languages. Among the suggested loanwords from a pre-Baltic language include the Finnic words saari 'island', niemi 'cape' and jänis 'hare', alongside the shared words between Baltic and Finnic such as *samanā "moss" and salo 'island'.

A list of words suggested by Saarikivi as having Paleo-Baltic origin:

Finnish	English
saari	island
niemi	cape
oja	ditch
nummi	moor
ilves	lynx
koipi	leg (of a bird)
nenä	nose
jänis	hare
salakka	bleak (fish)
liha	meat

Many words relating to fish in Finnic may have substrate etymologies suggesting influence from a culture centered around fishing. It is likely that this Paleo-European language also influenced some Indo-European languages. It has been suggested that the Paleo-European language of the Baltic was perhaps related to Paleo-Laplandic, either by influence or by genetic relationship, particularly the words for "moss" and "island" have been suggested as cognates between Paleo-Laplandic and Paleo-Baltic.

=== Pre-Finno-Volgaic substrate ===
There are also some examples of possible substrate words the hypothetical Finno-Volgaic languages group that differ from the Pre-Sámi substrate, i.e. Proto-Finno-Volgaic *täštä 'star', or *kümmin 'ten'.

Some words in Finno-Volgaic languages contain rare consonant clusters, which suggests loanwords from unknown languages.

Finnish words such as jauho ('flour'), lehmä ('cow'), tähti ('star'), tammi ('oak') and ihminen ('human') could be substrate words.

Aikio (2021) lists some other substrate vocabulary as:

Proto-form	Gloss
*wakštVrV	maple
*wešnä	wheat / spelt
*päkšnä	lime tree
?*riŋiši	drying kiln
?*räppä(-nä)	smoke hole
*tammi	oak
*särńä	ash
*ša/u(w)p(k)a	aspen
*le/i(j)p(p)ä	alder
*pVškV(nä)	hazel

Irregular correspondences among Uralic languages are frequent among some words, such as 'to milk' and 'hazelnut'. These are presumed to be non-native loanwords by Aikio (2021):

Language	Form	Gloss	Etymology
Finnish	lypsää	to milk	< *lüpsä- or *lüpćä-
Mordvin	lovso, lofca	milk	< *lupsV or *lipsa
Mari	lüštem, dial. lüśtem, lǝštem	to milk	< *lüstä- ? < *lüps-tä-
Komi	li̮śt̮i-	to milk	< PNo *lüćtV- or *lućtV- (? < *lü/upć-tA-)

Language	Form	Gloss	Etymology
Finnish	pähkinä, pähkenä	(hazel)nut	< *päškinä (?)
Mordvin	päšťä, päščä (etc.)	(hazel)nut	< *päš?
Mari	pükš	hazelnut	< ?*pekši
Udmurt	paš-, puš-	hazel(nut)	< *pVškV or *pVkšV

== Toponyms ==
Some toponyms in Finland appear to be of non-Uralic origin; for example, a word koita regularly appears in hydronyms for long and narrow bodies of water and is thus probably the continuation of the native word for 'long, narrow'.

Many other toponyms in Finland seem to come from a substrate language or from multiple substrate languages: among these are Saimaa, Imatra, Päijänne, and Inari.

There are also toponyms from a substrate language in Sápmi; for example, an ending -ir (< *-ērē) is commonly found in names of mountains and is probably the continuation of the substrate word for 'mountain'.

Other such toponymic words are *skiečč 'watershed', *čār- 'uppermost (lake)', *jeak(k)- 'isolated mountain', *nus- 'mountain top on the edge of a mountain area', *sāl- 'large island in the sea', *čiest- 'seashore cliff', and *inč- 'outermost island'.

== Languages ==
There are irregularities in Sámi substrate words which suggest they might have been borrowed from distinct, but related languages. In the west, the substrate languages probably had an s-type sibilant which corresponds to an š-type sibilant in the east.

As we only have fragments of Lakelandic Sámi which were preserved in Finnish placenames and dialectal vocabulary, the features of the Paleo-Lakelandic substrate in Lakelandic Sámi cannot be studied. Many placenames in Finland come from Sámi words of unknown origin which are likely substrate words, such as jokuu from Proto-Sámi *čuokōs ‘track, way’.

The Sámi substrate in Finnish dialects also reveals that Lakelandic Sámi languages had a high number of words with an obscure origin, likely deriving from old languages of the region.

== See also ==
- List of Proto-Samic terms derived from substrate languages
- List of Proto-Samic terms with unknown etymologies
- Paleo-European languages
- Germanic substrate hypothesis
- Goidelic substrate hypothesis
- Old European hydronymy
- Comb Ceramic culture
