= Thomas Mohnike =

German professor of Scandinavian Studies

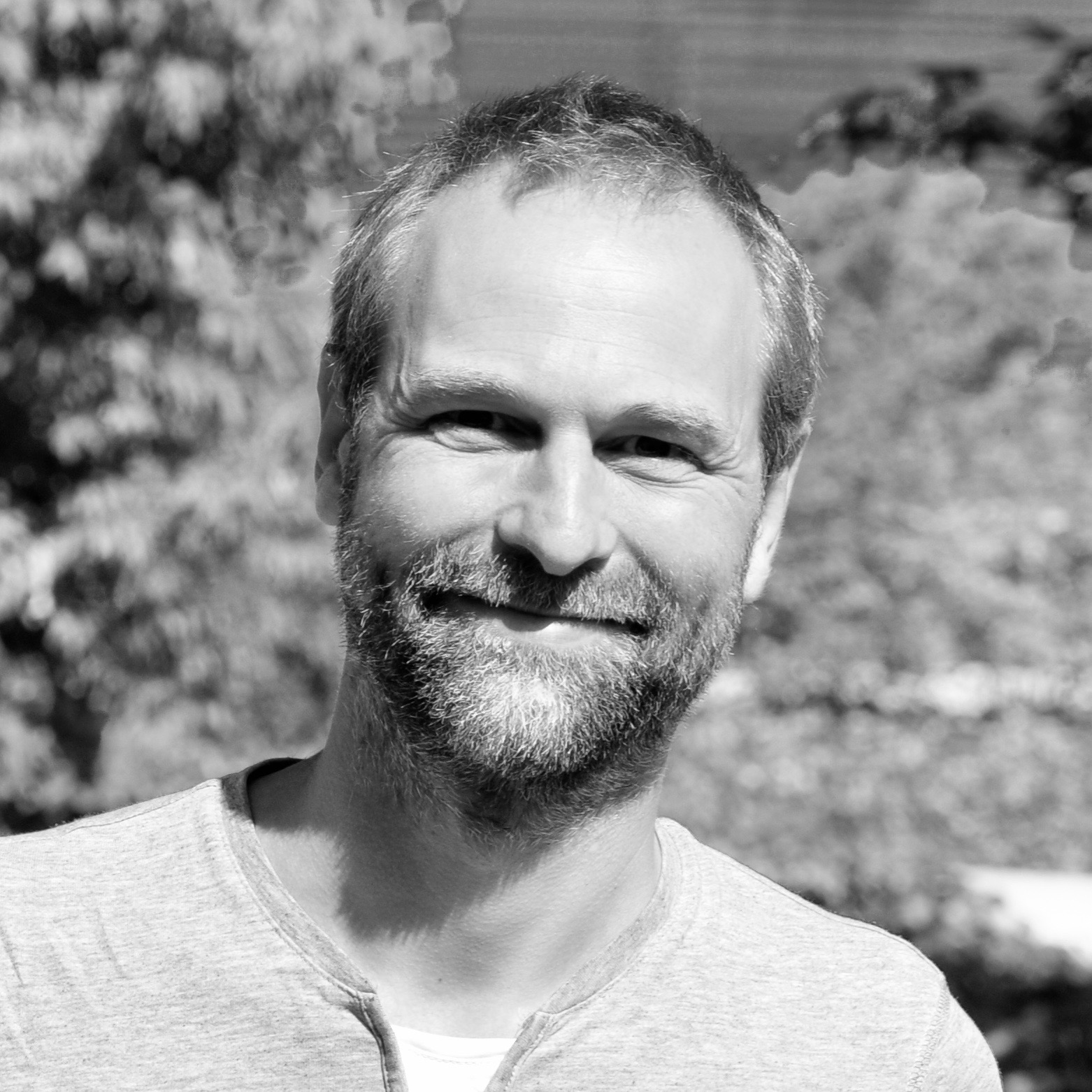
- Born: 9 August 1974 (age 50)
- Occupation: Professor of Scandinavian Studies
- Employer: University of Strasbourg

Thomas Mohnike (born 9 August 1974) is a specialist in Literature and Cultural Studies and Professor of Scandinavian Studies at the University of Strasbourg.

== Biography ==
Born in East Berlin, Thomas Mohnike grew up in Magdeburg where he completed his high school education with the Abitur. Starting 1993 he studied art history, Germanic studies, Scandinavian studies and cultural studies in Charleston, Kiel, Uppsala and Berlin. In 2001, he completed his master's degree at the Nordeuropa-Institut of the Humboldt University in Berlin, with a thesis Leerstellen barocker Repräsentation. Der Paratext in den Ausgaben von Georg Stiernhielms Hercules und sein Einfluss auf die Interpretation. In 2006, he defended his doctoral thesis Imaginierte Geographien. Der schwedische Reisebericht der 1980er und 1990er Jahre und das Ende des kalten Krieges at the University of Freiburg im Breisgau. In 2015 he obtained his habilitation with his thesis Identités narratives & géographies d'appartenance. Eléments pour une théorie des formes narratives de savoir social en circulation culturelle.

== Research and teaching ==
Mohnike worked as a research assistant at the department of Scandinavian studies at the Albert-Ludwigs-University of Freiburg (2001–2007) and the department of Scandinavian studies at the University of Strasbourg (2007–2008). As visiting researcher he stayed at the University of Copenhagen (2004), University of Gothenburg (2013) and the Centre Marc Bloch in Berlin (2016–2017).

In 2008 he became head of the department of Scandinavian studies at the University of Strasbourg, where he was appointed professor in 2017. His main field of research within Scandinavian literary and cultural studies are the history of the field's research, Scandinavian identity history and imaginary geography. He did also research on contemporary Swedish literature and baroque literature.

He is co-editor (together with Thomas Beaufils) of the journal Deshima : Revue d'histoire globale des Pays du Nord (since 2009), the publication series Globalizing Fiction (together with Charlotte Krauss and Urs Urban) at Lit Verlag (since 2012) and (together with Michael Rießler and Joshua Wilbur) of the publication series Samica at the Albert-Ludwigs-Universität Freiburg (since 2014). Since 2013 he has been the founding president of the Association pour les études nordiques, the French professional association for Northern European Studies.

Mohnike also works as a translator from Swedish and writes contributions for popular science blogs and magazines. Together with Heide Henschel, he published a children's book at Kookbooks in 2004. He is also the author of a brochure explaining the Ullrich-Turner syndrome.

== Selection of publications ==
=== Scientific ===
==== Monograph ====
- 2007 Imaginierte Geographien. Der schwedischsprachige Reisebericht der 1980er und 1990er Jahre und das Ende des Kalten Krieges. Würzburg: Ergon-Verlag

==== Books edited ====
- 2007 Faszination des Illegitimen : Alterität in Konstruktionen von Genealogie, Herkunft und Ursprünglichkeit in den skandinavischen Literaturen seit 1800. Würzburg: Ergon-Verlag (with Constanze Gestrich)
- 2011 Auf der Suche nach dem verlorenen Epos : Ein populäres Genre der europäischen Literatur des 19. Jahrhunderts. Münster: Lit Verlag (with Charlotte Krauss)
- 2017 Geographies of Knowledge and Imagination in 19th Century Philological Research on Northern Europe. Newcastle upon Tyne: Cambridge Scholars Publishing (with Joachim Grage)

==== Articles ====
- 2006 Doppelte Fremdheit : Zur Verschränkung und Konstitution von poetischer und kultureller Alterität in Alejandro Leiva Wengers „Till vår ära“ und seiner Rezeption, in: Sven Hakon Rossel (Éd.): Der Norden im Ausland – Das Ausland im Norden : Formung und Transformation von Konzepten und Bildern des Anderen vom Mittelalter bis heute. Wien: Praesens Verlag, p. 150–158
- 2006 „Bildung und Alteritätskonstitution in der jüngsten schwedischen Migrantenliteratur“, in: Behschnitt, Wolfgang; Barz, Christiane (Éd.) Bildung und Anderes : Alterität in Bildungsdikursen in den skandinavischen Literaturen. Würzburg: Ergon-Verlag, p. 201–229 (with Wolfgang Behschnitt)
- 2010 Grands courants, grands hommes, grands récits : Structures de la géographie des nations dans l'œuvre de Georg Brandes, in: Annie Bourguignon, Konrad Harrer, Jørgen Stender Claussen (Éd.) Grands courants d'échanges intellectuels : Georg Brandes et la France, l'Allemagne et l'Angleterre. Bern: Peter Lang, 2010, p. 37–50
- 2010 Eine im Raum verankerte Wissenschaft? Aspekte einer Geschichte der „Abteilung Germanenkunde und Skandinavistik“ der Reichsuniversität Straßburg, in: NORDEUROPAforum 1–2/2010, p. 63–86
- 2012 Géographies du savoir historique : Paul-Henri Mallet entre rêves gothiques, germaniques et celtiques, in: Eric Schnakenbourg (Éd.) Figures du Nord : Scandinavie, Groenland et Sibérie : Perceptions et représentations des espaces septentrionaux du Moyen Âge au XVIIIe siècle. Rennes: Presses universitaires de Rennes, p. 215–226
- 2013 Frédéric-Guillaume/Friedrich-Wilhelm Bergmann und die Geburt der Skandinavistik in Frankreich aus dem Geiste der vergleichenden Philologie, in: Karin Hoff, Udo Schönling, Per Øhrgaard (Éd.) Kulturelle Dreiecksbeziehungen : Aspekte der Kulturvermittlung zwischen Frankreich, Deutschland und Dänemark in der ersten Hälfte des 19. Jahrhunderts. Würzburg: Königshausen & Neumann, p. 277–297

=== Children's book ===
- 2004 Luise und das langweiligste Buch der Welt Idstein: Kookbooks. ISBN 9783937445076 (with Heide Henschel)
