= Paleo-Laplandic languages =

Hypothetical group of extinct languages of northern Fennoscandia

Paleo-Laplandic
- Native to: Sápmi
- Extinct: around 500 AD
- Language family: unclassified

Language codes
- ISO 639-3: None (mis)
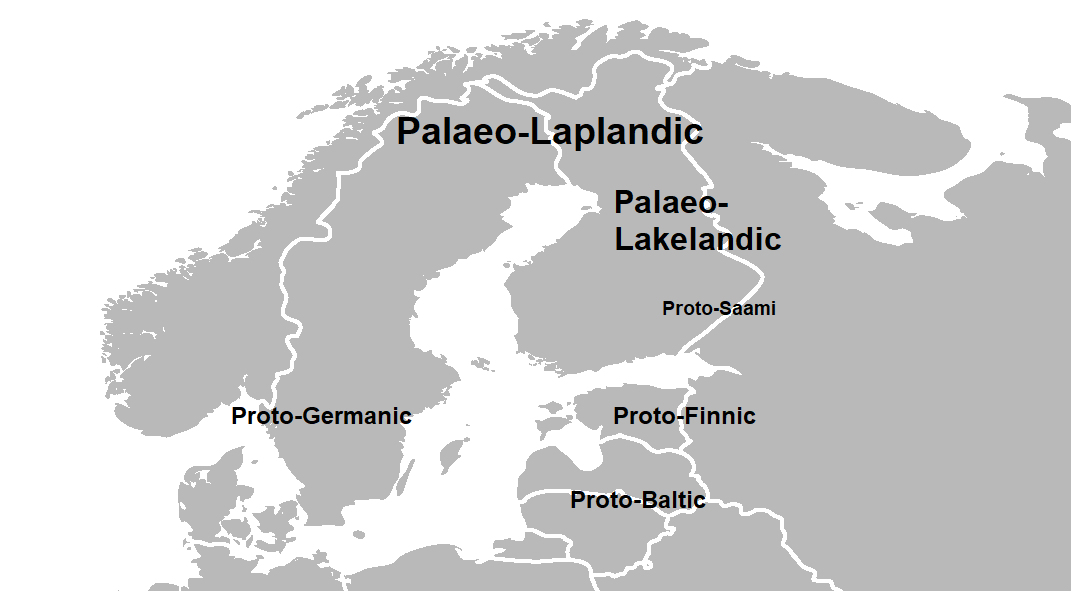
- Languages of northern Europe in the early iron age

Paleo-Laplandic is a hypothetical group of extinct but related languages spoken in Sápmi (northern Scandinavia, traditionally known as Lapland). The speakers of Paleo-Laplandic languages switched to and/or were replaced by speakers of Sámi languages, and the languages became extinct around AD 500. A considerable amount of words in Sámi languages originate from Paleo-Laplandic; more than 1,000 loanwords from Paleo-Laplandic likely exist. Many toponyms in Sápmi originate from Paleo-Laplandic. Because Sámi language etymologies for reindeers have preserved a large number of words from Paleo-Laplandic, this suggests that Paleo-Laplandic groups influenced Sámi culture.

Due to irregular correspondences in Sámi loanwords from Paleo-Laplandic, it can be theorized that the words were borrowed from distinct but related languages that were characterized in the west by an s-type sibilant, while in the east it was an š-type sibilant.

Many words relating to the environment or reindeer such as ája ("spring of water") are likely loanwords from Paleo-Laplandic into Sámi. The substrate words have no apparent parallels to any known language. Linguist Jurij Kuzmenko compared them with the Pre-Germanic substrate words but found no similarities aside from a distinction between central and peripheral accentuation.

Another group, the Paleo-Lakelandic languages are a hypothetical group of languages similar to the Paleo-Laplandic languages which influenced the Saami languages more South, that were later assimilated by Finnic people. Nevertheless, the Saami substrate vocabulary in Finnish reveals many words of unknown origin which derive from the Paleo-European languages spoken in the region. Words such as *kāvë 'bend' and *šāpšë 'whitefish' have been identified as originating in Paleo-Lakelandic.

== List of substratum words ==
Northern Sami
Substratum Word	English
áidni	bearded seal
ákču	harbor seal
buovjja	beluga
dealljá	harp seal
deavut	gray seal
gáhtir	seal's flipper
jeagis	bearded seal
jiepma	seal pup
morša	walrus
noarvi	seal
njuorjju	seal
oaidu	ringed seal
riehkku	middle-sized harbor seal
roahkka	harbor seal
rohka	full-grown male seal
skávdu	2-year-old harbor seal
skuogga	baleen
vieksi	young harbor seal

== Features ==
A large amount of Sami root words that start with the Č or K sounds tend to be from Paleo-Laplandic. Paleo-Laplandic, like Sami, had many different words for describing different types of animals, weather, and geographical features they often encountered.

== Decline ==
The time from 1 AD to 700 AD was a time of massive change in Sápmi, as Proto-Sami speakers migrated north from Southern Finland and Karelia to northern Fennoscandia. During this process the Paleo-Laplandic language was supplanted by Proto-Sami, though it is unclear if Paleo-Laplandic had any contact with Old Norse.

== See also ==
- Pre-Finno-Ugric substrate
