= Järbo IF =

Swedish football club

- Full name: Järbo Idrottsförening
- Founded: 1927
- Ground: Järbo IP; Järbo; Sweden
- League: Division 4 Gestrikland
Home colours

Järbo IF is a Swedish football club located in Järbo.

== Background ==
Järbo IF currently plays in Division 4 Gestrikland which is the sixth tier of Swedish football. They play their home matches at the Järbo IP in Järbo.

The club is affiliated to Gestriklands Fotbollförbund. Järbo IF have competed in the Svenska Cupen on 15 occasions and have played 21 matches in the competition.

== Season to season ==
Season	Level	Division	Section	Position	Movements
1999	Tier 6	Division 5	Gästrikland	3rd	Promoted
2000	Tier 5	Division 4	Gästrikland	8th	
2001	Tier 5	Division 4	Gästrikland	6th	
2002	Tier 5	Division 4	Gästrikland	9th	
2003	Tier 5	Division 4	Gästrikland	8th	
2004	Tier 5	Division 4	Gästrikland	9th	
2005	Tier 5	Division 4	Gästrikland	2nd	Playoffs – Promoted
2006*	Tier 5	Division 3	Södra Norrland	9th	Relegation Playoffs – Relegated
2007	Tier 6	Division 4	Gästrikland	2nd	Promoted
2008	Tier 5	Division 3	Södra Norrland	9th	
2009	Tier 5	Division 3	Södra Norrland	11th	Relegated
2010	Tier 6	Division 4	Gästrikland	7th	
2011	Tier 6	Division 4	Gästrikland	5th	

* League restructuring in 2006 resulted in a new division being created at Tier 3 and subsequent divisions dropping a level.
