= Pite Sámi =

Endangered Uralic language of Scandinavia

- bidumsámegiella
- Native to: Sweden
- Region: Pite River
- Native speakers: 25 to 50 (2010)
- Language family: Uralic: Sámi; Western; Central; Lule–Pite; Pite Sámi
- Writing system: Latin

Language codes
- ISO 639-3: sje
- Glottolog: pite1240
- ELP: Pite Saami
- Pite Sami language area (red) within Sápmi (grey)

- Pite Saami is classified as Critically Endangered by the UNESCO Atlas of the World's Languages in Danger

Pite Sámi or Arjeplog Sámi (Pite Sami: Bidumsámegiella, Swedish: Pitesamiska, Norwegian: Pitesamisk) is a Sámi language traditionally spoken in Sweden and Norway. It is a critically endangered language that has only about 25–50 native speakers left and is now almost only spoken on the Swedish side of the border along the Pite River in the north of Arjeplog and Arvidsjaur and in the mountainous areas of the Arjeplog municipality.

== Classification ==
Pite Sámi is a part of the Western Sámi group, together with Southern Sámi and Ume Sámi to the south, Lule Sámi and Northern Sámi to the north. Of these, Pite Sámi shows closest affinity to Lule Sámi, but a number of features also show similarity to Ume and Southern Sámi.

== Phonology ==
=== Consonants ===
The Pite Sámi consonant inventory is very similar to that found in neighbouring Lule Sámi, but lacks contrastive voicing of stops and affricates entirely.

Pite Sámi consonants
		Labial	Dental	Alveolar	Palatal	Velar
Nasal		m	n		ɲ	ŋ
Plosive / Affricate		p	t	t͡s	t͡ʃ	k
Fricative	voiceless	f		s	ʃ	h
Fricative	voiced	v	(ð)			
Semivowel		v			j	
Lateral				l		
Trill				r		

- Stops before a homorganic nasal (pre-stopped nasals) are realised as unreleased stops.
- /v/ is realised as a labiodental fricative [v] in the syllable onset (before a vowel), and as bilabial [w] in the syllable coda (in a consonant cluster).
- /ð/ is present only in the language of some elderly speakers. It is otherwise replaced by /r/ or /t/, depending on dialect.

=== Vowels ===
The Pite Sámi vowel inventory has a relative lack of phonemic diphthongs, compared to other Sámi languages and particularly neighbouring Lule Sámi. Instead, there are more vowel height distinctions.

Pite Sámi vowels
	Monophthongs		Diphthongs	
	Front	Back	Front	Back
Close	i	u	(ie̯)	(uo̯)
Close-mid	e	o	uæ̯	uɑ̯
Open-mid	ɛ	ɔ ɔː	uæ̯	uɑ̯
Open	a aː			

- The close vowels /i/ and /u/ are realized as laxer [ɪ] and [ʊ] respectively, in unstressed positions.
- Close-mid /e/ and /o/ are diphthongized to [ie̯] and [uo̯] respectively, when stressed.
- /ɔ/ contrasts with /ɔː/ in near-minimal pairs such as båhtet /ˈpɔːhteːt/ "to come" vs båhtjet /ˈpɔht͡ʃeːt/ "to milk".
- /ɛ/ does not occur in unstressed syllables.
- /ɔ/ can occur in unstressed syllables, but only when a preceding stressed syllable contains /ɔ/.

Sammallahti divides Pite Sámi dialects as follows:

- Northern dialects: Luokta-Mávas in Sweden
- Central dialects: Semisjaur-Njarg in Sweden
- Southern dialects: Svaipa in Sweden

Features of the northern dialects are:

- Lack of /aː/ → /eː/ umlaut.
- Voicing in quantity 3 of plain stops (thus strong /bː.b/ ~ weak /p.p/ etc.), like in Lule Sámi.
- /t/ as the outcome of Proto-Samic *đ.

Features of the southern dialects are:

- /r/ as the outcome of Proto-Samic *đ.-->

== Orthography ==
For a long time, Pite Sámi was one of the four Sámi languages without an official written language. A working orthography was developed in 2008–2011 by the Sámi Association of Arjeplog; this version was described by Joshua Wilbur and implemented in the dictionary Pitesamisk ordbok samt stavningsregler, published in 2016. On August 20, 2019, an official orthography was approved for the language. The orthography closely resembles the orthography of neighbouring Lule Sámi.

Letter	Pronunciation	Notes
A a	[ɑ]	
Á á	[ɑː]	
B b	[p]	
D d	[t]	
Đ đ	[ð]	
E e	[eː], [ɪe̯], [e]	
F f	[f]	
G g	[k]	
H h	[h]	
I i	[ɪ]	
J j	[j]	
K k	[k], [ʰk], [kʰ]	Postaspirated at the beginning of a stressed syllable.
L l	[l]	
M m	[m]	
N n	[n]	
Ŋ ŋ	[ŋ]	
O o	[oː], [ʊɒ̝̯]	
P p	[p], [ʰp], [pʰ]	Postaspirated at the beginning of a stressed syllable.
R r	[r]	
S s	[s]	
T t	[t], [ʰt], [tʰ]	Postaspirated at the beginning of a stressed syllable.
Ŧ ŧ	[θ]	
U u	[ʊ], [ʊː]	
V v	[ʋ]	
Å å	[ɒ̝], [ɒ̝ː]	
Ä ä	[æː]	

=== Digraphs ===
Pite Sámi digraphs
Digraph	Pronunciation	Notes
ie	[ɪe̯]	
ua	[ʊɑ̯]	
uo	[ʊɒ̝̑]	
uä	[ʊæ̯]	

== Grammar ==
=== Cases ===
Pite Sámi has nine cases:

- Nominative
- Genitive
- Accusative
- Inessive
- Illative
- Elative
- Comitative
- Essive
- Abessive

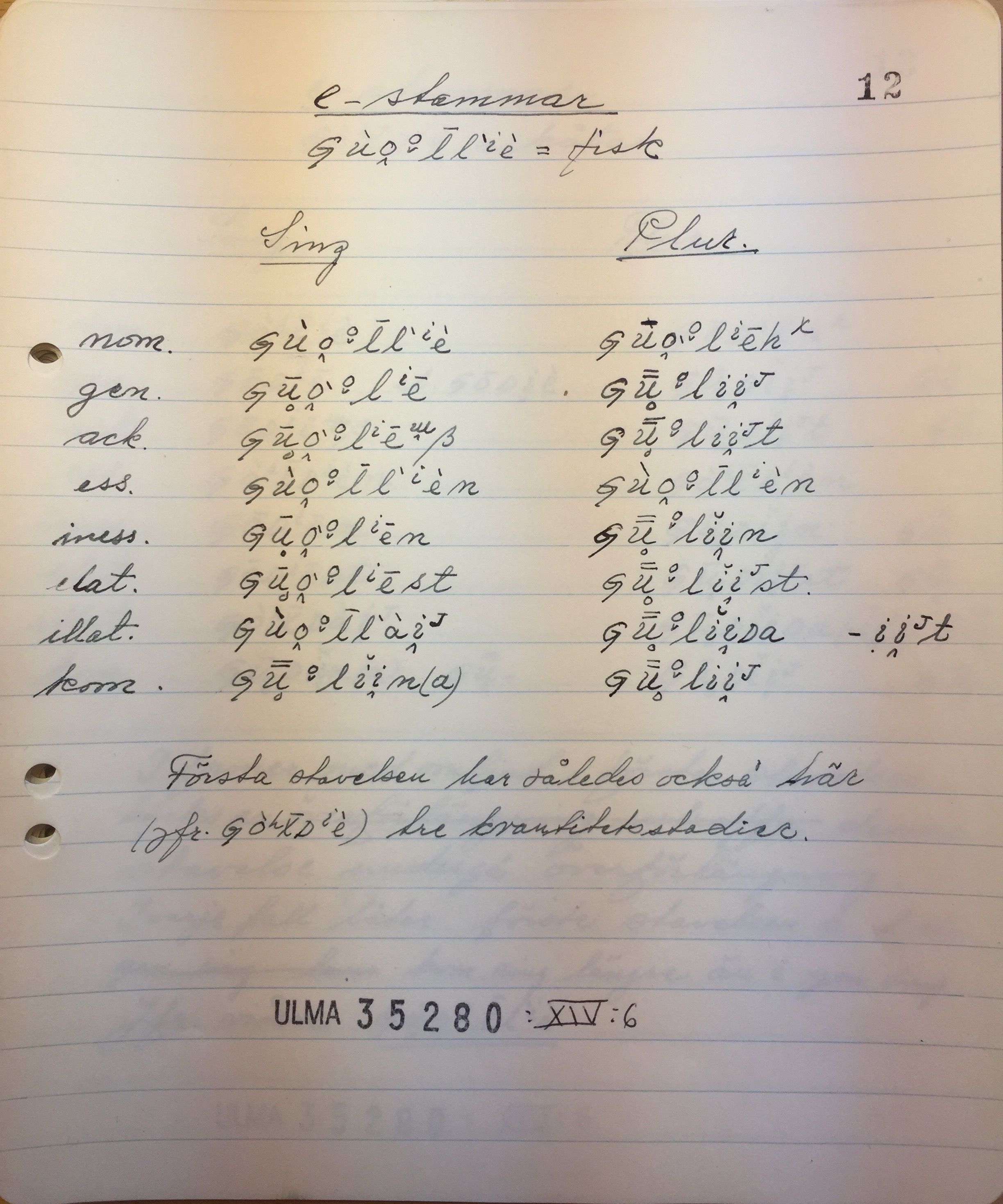
The inflectional paradigm for the noun guolle 'fish' by Israel Ruong, archived at the Swedish Institute for Language and Folklore in Uppsala.

=== Verbs ===
==== Person ====
Pite Sámi verbs conjugate for three grammatical persons:

- first person
- second person
- third person

==== Mood ====
Pite Sámi has five grammatical moods:

- indicative
- imperative
- conditional
- potential
- optative

==== Grammatical number ====
Pite Sámi verbs conjugate for three grammatical numbers:

- singular
- dual
- plural

==== Tense ====
Pite Sámi verbs conjugate for two simple tenses:

- past
- non-past

and two compound tenses:

- Present perfect
- Pluperfect

==== Negative verb ====
Pite Sámi, like Finnish, the other Sámi languages and Estonian, has a negative verb. In Pite Sámi, the negative verb conjugates according to mood (indicative, imperative and optative), person (1st, 2nd and 3rd) and number (singular, dual and plural). This differs from some of the other Sámi languages, e.g. from Northern Sámi, which do not conjugate according to tense and other Sámi languages, that do not use the optative.

	Non-past indicative				Past indicative		
	Singular	Dual	Plural		Singular	Dual	Plural
1st person	iv	ien	iehp, iep	1	ittjiv	iejmen, ittjijmen	iejmeh, ittjijmeh
2nd person	ih	iehpen, ähpen, ihpen	iehpit, ihpit	2	ittjih	iejten, ittjijten	iejteh, ittjijteh
3rd person	ij	iepá, iepán	ieh	3	ittjij	iejkán, ittjijka	ittjin

For non-past indicative versions that have more than one form, the second one is from the dialect spoken around Björkfjället and the third is from the Svaipa dialect. The plurality in the other forms is due to parallel forms that are not bound by dialect.

	Singular	Dual	Plural
	Imperative		
2nd person	ieleh	iellen	iellit
	Optative		
1st person	alluv	iellun, allun	iellup, allup
2nd person	alluh	ielluten, alluten	ielluteh, alluteh
3rd person	allus	ielluska, alluska	ielluseh, alluseh

== Lexicographic sources ==
A number of (re)sources exist with extensive collections of Pite Sámi lexical items, including grammatical and (morpho)phonological information to various extents. These include:

- Ignácz Halász published a collection of Pite Sámi lexical items in 1896 with Hungarian and German translations in the book Pite lappmarki szótár és nyelvtan. Pite Sámi words are written in using a UPA-type standard.
- Eliel Lagercrantz published a two-volume collection of Sámi lexical items in 1939 titled Lappischer Wortschatz with German translations. Many of the entries include Pite Sámi forms, which are marked with the abbreviation Arj (for Arjeplog, as Pite Sámi is often referred to as "Arjeplog Sámi" as well). Pite Sámi words are written in using a UPA-type standard.
- Just Knud Qvigstad created a wordlist of Pite Sámi words in his Lappisk ordliste : Arjeplog-dialekt (Beiarn–Saltdal–Rana). This handwritten manuscript is from around 1928 and can be found on the Norwegian National Library website
- Israel Ruong's collection of handwritten note cards and other materials with Pite Sámi lexical items is archived at the Swedish Institute for Language and Folklore in Uppsala.
- Although not intended primarily as a lexicographic collection, Israel Ruong's 1943 dissertation Lappische Verbalableitung dargestellt auf Grundlage des Pitelappischen is in fact a rich source of derived verbs. These are presented in a somewhat simplified UPA-type transcription with explanations and translations in German.
- Arjeplogs sameförening (the Arjeplog Sámi association) carried out a project called Insamling av pitesamiska ord (Collection of Pite Sámi words) between 2008 and 2012, written in a preliminary version of the current standard orthography. This wordlist includes translations into Swedish and Norwegian.
- A Pite Sámi dictionary and set of orthographic rules was published in 2016 as Pitesamisk ordbok samst stavningsregler in the book series Samica. This collection is based on the wordlist created by Arjeplogs sameförening (cf. previous item), but with significant editing and additions covering grammatical and phonological information by the editor (J. Wilbur). It includes translations into Swedish and English, and uses a preliminary version of the current standard orthography. A website with these orthographic rules can be found at Pitesamiska stavningsregler.
- A searchable lexical database is accessible online at Bidumsáme Báhkogirrje. It is maintained by linguist J. Wilbur (in collaboration with O. Utne and P. Steggo), and is regularly being updated, corrected and edited, especially checking for consistency and adherence to the standard orthography; missing lexemes are also added on a regular basis.
- A searchable lexical database including automatically generated inflectional paradigms for a large subset of the lexical items in the Bidumsáme Báhkogirrje (cf. previous item) can be found in the Nähttadigibáhko, hosted by Giellatekno at the University of Tromsø, with collaborative development of the language technology tools for Pite Sámi by J. Wilbur. This uses the standard orthography.
- A mobile phone app called BidumBágo (for Android systems) is under development by Olve Utne at the Norwegian Institute of Local History and National Library of Norway (in collaboration with P. Steggo and J. Wilbur). It currently has more than 7500 main entries, including references to older sources, many place names, and translations into Norwegian, Swedish, German and English. This uses the standard orthography and can be downloaded from the Facebook group BidumBágo or the Pite Sámi news site and knowledge base Sallto.no.
