= Ume Sámi =

Endangered Uralic language of Scandinavia

- ubmejesámiengiälla
- Native to: Sweden
- Native speakers: 20 (2010)
- Language family: Uralic: Sámi; Western; Southwestern; Ume Sámi
- Writing system: Latin

Language codes
- ISO 639-3: sju
- Glottolog: umes1235
- ELP: Ume Saami
- Ume Sami language area (red) within Sápmi (grey)

- Ume Saami is classified as Critically Endangered by the UNESCO Atlas of the World's Languages in Danger

Ume Sámi (Ume Sami: Ubmejesámiengiälla, Norwegian: Umesamisk, Swedish: Umesamiska) is a Sámi language spoken in Sweden and formerly in Norway. According to UNESCO's Atlas of the World's Languages in Danger (2010), there are fewer than 20 speakers of Ume Sami. It was spoken mainly along the Ume River in the south of present-day Arjeplog, in Sorsele and in Arvidsjaur.

== Dialects ==
The best documented variety of Ume Sami is that of one Lars Sjulsson (born 1871) from Setsele, close to Malå, whose idiolect was documented by W. Schlachter in a 1958 dictionary and subsequent work. Dialect variation exists within the Ume Sami area, however. A main division is between more (north)western dialects such as those of Maskaure, Tärna and Ullisjaure (typically agreeing with Southern Sami), versus more (south)eastern dialects such as those of Malå, Malmesjaure and Mausjaure (typically agreeing with Pite Sami).

Feature	Western Ume Sami	Eastern Ume Sami	Notes
original *ðː	/rː/	/ðː/	
accusative singular ending	-p	-w	from Proto-Samic *-m
word for 'eagle'	(h)àrʰčə	àrtnəs	

== Phonology ==
=== Consonants ===
		Labial	Dental/ Alveolar	Post- alveolar	Velar	Glottal
Nasal		m	n	ɲ	ŋ	
Plosive		p	t		k	
Affricate			t͡s	t͡ʃ		
Fricative	voiceless	v	s	ʃ		h
Fricative	voiced	v	ð			
Trill			r			
Approximant			l	j		

[f, ʋ] and [θ] are allophones of /v/ and /ð/, respectively. When a /h/ sound occurs before a plosive or an affricate sound, they are then realized as preaspirated sounds. If an /l/ sound occurs before a /j/ sound, it is realized as a palatal lateral [ʎ] sound. Some western dialects of the language lack the /ð/ phoneme.

=== Vowels ===
	Front			Central		Back	
	short		long	short	long	short	long
Close	i	y	iː	ʉ	ʉː	u	uː
Mid	e		eː			o	oː
Open				a	aː		

Four diphthongs are included; /ie/, /yʉ/, /ʉi/, /uo/. A schwa sound /ə/ may exist as an allophone of various vowel sounds.

== Writing system ==
Until 2010, Ume Sámi did not have an official written standard, although it was the first Sámi language to be written extensively (because a private Christian school for Sámi children started in Lycksele 1632, where Ume Sámi was spoken). The New Testament was published in Ume Sámi in 1755 and the first Bible in Sámi was also published in Ume Sámi, in 1811.

The current official orthography is maintained by the Working Group for Ume Sámi, whose most recent recommendation was published in 2016.

Letter/Digraph	Phoneme(s)
A a	/ʌ/
Á á	/ɑː/
B b	/p/
D d	/t/
Đ đ	/ð/
E e	/e/, /eː/
F f	/f/
G g	/k/
H h	/h/
I i	/i/
Ï ï	/ɨ/
J j	/j/
K k	/hk/, /k/
L l	/l/
M m	/m/
N n	/n/
Ŋ ŋ	/ŋ/
O o	/o/ (only in diphthongs)
P p	/hp/, /p/
R r	/r/
S s	/s/
T t	/ht/, /t/
Tj tj	/tʃ/
Ŧ ŧ	/θ/
U u	/u/, /uː/
Ü ü	/ʉ/, /ʉː/
V v	/v/
Y y	/y/
Å å	/o/, /ɔː/
Ä ä	/ɛː/
Ö ö	/œ/ (only in diphthongs)

Shortcomings:

- Vowel length is ambiguous for the letters ⟨u⟩, ⟨ü⟩ and ⟨å⟩. In reference works, the length is indicated by a macron (⟨ū⟩, ⟨ǖ⟩, ⟨å̄⟩). In older orthographies, length could be indicated by writing a double vowel.
- No distinction is made between long and overlong consonants, both being written with a double consonant letter. In reference works, the overlong stops are indicated with a vertical line (⟨bˈb⟩, ⟨dˈd⟩ etc.)

== Grammar ==
=== Consonant gradation ===
Unlike its southern neighbor Southern Sámi, Ume Sámi has consonant gradation. However, gradation is more limited than it is in the more northern Sami languages, because it does not occur in the case of short vowels followed by a consonant that can gradate to quantity 1 (that is, Proto-Samic single consonants or geminates). In these cases, only quantity 3 appears. Consonant clusters can gradate regardless of the preceding vowel.

=== Cases ===
Ume Sámi has 8 cases:

1. Nominative
2. Accusative
3. Genitive
4. Illative
5. Inessive
6. Elative
7. Comitative
8. Essive

=== Pronouns ===
Like other Sámi languages, Ume Sámi distinguishes pronouns in three numbers but not in gender. There are different words for “we”, “you”, and “they” depending on whether the referent is the two of us, the two of you, the two of them (dual) or if it includes more than two (three or more).

	Singular	Dual	Plural
1st person	månna	månnije	mïjjah
2nd person	dådna	dåj	dïjjah
3rd person	sådna	såj	sïjjah

=== Verbs ===
==== Persons and numbers ====
Verbs in Ume Sámi encode three persons, first, second and third. As with pronouns, verbs also enconde the three grammatical numbers: singular, dual and plural.

==== Tense, Mood, and aspect ====
Verbs in Ume Sámi encode two tenses, present and past, and two grammatical moods: indicative and imperative.

==== Negative verb ====
Ume Sámi, like all Finnic and other Sámi languages, has a negative verb. In Ume Sámi, the negative verb conjugates according to mood (indicative and imperative), person (1st, 2nd and 3rd) and number (singular, dual and plural).

== Lexicon ==
=== Kinship terms ===
Kinship terms in Ume Sámi mostly descend from proto-Uralic or proto-Samic (see below). As in many Uralic languages, the word for “son” is a borrowing, in Ume Sámi bárnnie, is also borrowed from Germanic barna.

Nuclear family
	mother	father	daughter	son	sister	brother
Ume Sámi	eädnie	áhttjie	neäjdda	bárnnie	åbbá	veällja
Northern Sámi	eadni	áhčči	nieida	bárdni	oabbá	viellja
Skolt Sámi	jeä′n'n ~ jie′n'n	e′č ~ ee′č	nijdd (niõđ)	pä′rnn	vuä′b'b	villj ~ vi′llj
Finnish	äiti (emä)	isä	tytär	poika	sisko	veli
Komi	мам (mam)	ай (aj)	ныв (nɨv)	детина (djetina)	соч (soč)	вок (vok)

For extended family members, Ume Sámi distinguishes not only the relationship to ego, but also their gender, sometimes their age and their own relationship to one's nuclear family.

Extended family
Grandmother	maternal		tjidtjáhkká, áhkká
Grandmother	paternal		áhtjáhkká, áhkká
Grandfather	maternal		tjidtjájjá, ájjá
Grandfather	paternal		áhtjájjá, ájjá
Aunt	maternal	older than mother	gåsskie
Aunt	maternal	younger than mother	muahrrá ~ muahđđa
Aunt	paternal		siässá
Uncle	maternal		jyönna
Uncle	paternal	older than father	jiehkie
Uncle	paternal	younger than father	tjiehtsie
Niece or Nephew	sister's child		niähpáde
Niece or Nephew	brother's child		siässale
Cousin			lávvie

=== Reindeer husbandry words ===
Traditionally, the Sámi are reindeer herders, and as such, Sámi languages have developed a wide vocabulary with terms to describe both the animal and actions related to its husbandry. These terms describe not only gender and age but also their color, their position in the herd, and others. Below are only some of the underived words, and many other possibilities exist in compounds, especially with -tjuoke and -ahkka as head words: giätjuoke “untamed reindeer”, ruadtjuoke, “a reindeer that digs after urine”, tjånatahkka “a reindeer that is tied to a sledge”, lijrestahkka “a reindeer that one leads”, etc.

General types of reindeer
reindeer	gifted reindeer	lone reindeer	straggler reindeer	castrated reindeer
båtsuoj	bánieke	veäjssa	såjbba	gáskieke

Transcription
Båtsuoj-bieŋjuv galggá báddie-gietjiesna álggiet lieratit. De tjuavrrá jiehtja viegadit ráddiesta ráddáje jah nav ájaj livva-sijiesna, guh jiehtják súhph. Die galggá daina báddie-bieŋjijne viegadit bijrra ieluon, nav júhtie biegŋja galggá vuöjdniet gúktie almatjh gelggh dahkat. Lierruo-biegŋja daggár bälij vánatallá ieluon bijrra ja ij akttak bijgŋuolissa luöjtieh. Die måddie bálliena daggár biegŋja, juhka ij leäh ållást lieratuvvama, die butsijda válldá ja dulvada. De daggár bälij tjuavrrá suv báddáje válldiet jah slåvvat.
Swedish translation

Renhunden ska man börja lära i koppel. Då måste man själv springa från den ena kanten till den andra (av renhjorden) och så också på (renarnas) viloplats, medan de andra äter. Då ska man med den där bandhunden springa runt hjorden, så att hunden ser, hur folket gör. Lärohunden springer en sådan gång runt hjorden och låter ingen undslippa. Så finns det ofta sådana hundar, som inte har lärt sig helt, som tar någon ren och jagar iväg den. Då måste man en sådan gång sätta band på den och slå den.

English translation

A reindeer herding dog must begin its training with a leash. Then one has to run from one side [of the herd] to the other and also on the area where they [the reindeer] rest, while others are eating. One must run around the herd with the dog [to be trained] on a leash, so that the dog sees how people do it. The trained dog then runs around the herd and does not allow any to slip away. Then there are often dogs that are not fully trained [and] who single out a reindeer and drive it away [i.e. to kill it]. Then one must put a leash on that [dog] and strike it.

== See also ==
- Sámi people
