= Swedish Institute for Language and Folklore =

Logo of Institute of language and folklore

The Institute for Language and Folklore (Swedish: Institutet för språk och folkminnen, acronym Isof), is a Swedish government agency with the purpose of studying and collecting materials concerning dialects, folklore and onomastics.

In June 2006 the Swedish government decided to centralize the Swedish language preservation institutes, starting on July 1, 2006. The former name, Swedish Institute for Dialectology, Onomastics and Folklore Research (Swedish: Språk- och folkminnesinstituet) was changed to the current name.

The institute consists of several, originally independent, units, located in different Swedish university towns. The central unit of the institute is located in Uppsala, with other departments located to Lund, Gothenburg, Umeå and Stockholm.

The institute is, among other things, responsible for the ongoing publication of Sveriges ortnamn (a dictionary of all Swedish placenames) and Sveriges medeltida personnamn (a dictionary of medieval Swedish personal names).

== Units of the Institute ==
- Administrative Unit (Uppsala)
- Department of Dialectology, Uppsala (Dialektavdelningen, DA)
- Folklore Department, Uppsala (Folkminnesavdelningen, FA)
- Phonogram Unit, Uppsala (Fonogramenheten)
- Department of Onomastics, Uppsala (Namnavdelning, NA).
- Archive for Dialects, Placenames and Folklore in Gothenburg (Dialekt-, ortnamns- och folkminnesarkivet i Göteborg, DAG)
- Archive for Dialects and Placenames in Lund (Dialekt- och ortnamnsarkivet i Lund, DAL)
- Swedish Language Council (Språkrådet)
- Archive for Dialects, Placenames and Folklore in Umeå (Dialekt-, ortnamns- och folkminnesarkivet i Umeå, DAUM)
