= Samica (periodical) =

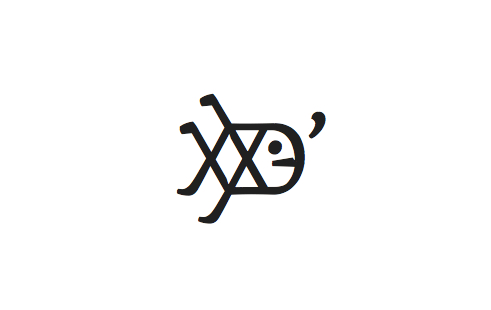
- Samica logo
- Subject: Sámi studies
- Language: multilingual
- Edited by: Thomas Mohnike, Michael Rießler, Joshua Wilbur

Publication details
- Former name: Kleine saamische Schriften
- History: 2014
- Publisher: University of Freiburg (Germany)
- Frequency: irregular

Standard abbreviations
- ISO 4: Samica

Indexing
- ISSN: 2199-6229
- OCLC no.: 942982829

Links
- Journal homepage

Samica is a multilingual interdisciplinary scholarly book series focused on the languages, literatures and cultures of Sápmi and published by the University of Freiburg. The first volume was published in 2014. The series editors are the literary scholar Thomas Mohnike (University of Strasbourg) and the linguists Michael Rießler and Joshua Wilbur (both University of Freiburg).

== History and Profile ==
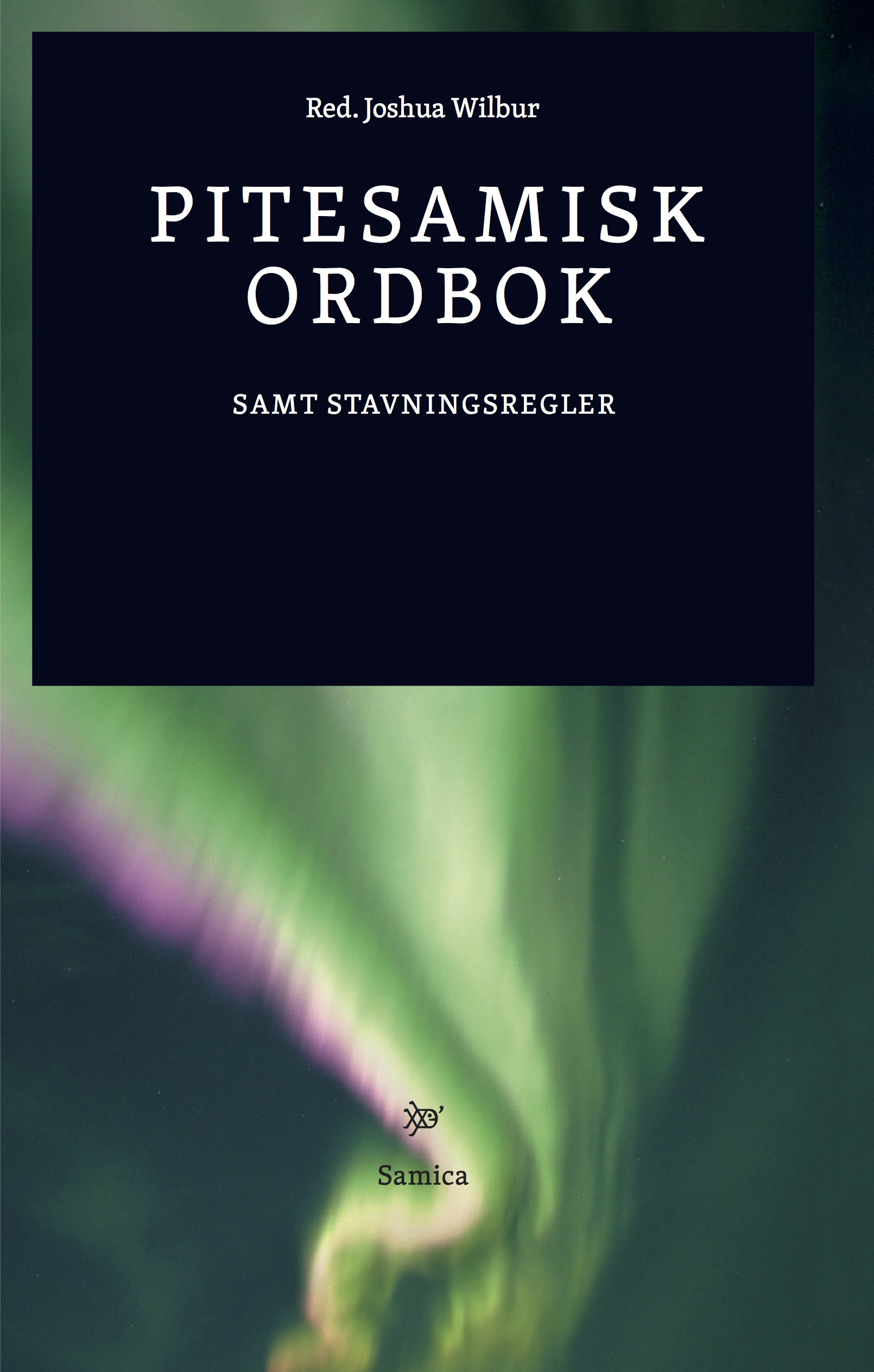
Samica, vol. 2

The series was founded in 2014 as the follow-up to the series Kleine saamische Schriften. Just as its predecessor, Samica is intended to reach a readership interested in a wide range of topics concerning Sámi studies. Volumes include contributions to the Sámi languages, literatures and cultures as well as teaching materials and literary texts both in the original languages and in translation. As of October 2018, four volumes have been published, and a fifth is scheduled to appear in the near future.

Samica is non-profit in the sense that any revenue accrued from the sale of books is used only in the production/publication of new books. In addition to having institutional assist by the University of Freiburg, various organizations in the Nordic countries have provided financial support for individual volumes in the series; these include: the Finnish Literature Exchange, Arjeplog municipality, Duoddara Ráfe Pite Saami Center, and Norwegian Literature Abroad.

The various volumes have been edited both by the series editors in Freiburg and Strasbourg and by the respective authors and translators. Volume 1 (Grüße aus Lappland), the German translation of a text by Nils-Aslak Valkeapää, premiered on the main stage for the guest of honor pavilion Finland at the Frankfurt Book Fair in 2014. Volume 4 (Worte verschwinden / fliegen / zum blauen Licht) is an anthology representing Sámi poetry between tradition and modernity in German translation and the parallel original versions. It is the first anthology of its kind in German. Volume 5 (Johan Turi) is the German translation of a scene play about the live of Johan Turi by Harald Gaski and Gunnar H. Gjengset, which is performed as part of the art exhibition HOUSE OF NORWAY in Frankfurt by Beaivváš Sámi Našunálateáhter. Both books premiered on the main stage for the guest of honor pavilion Norway at the Frankfurt Book Fair in 2019 (vol. 4 on 17 October and vol. 5 on 16 October 2019).

Whereas the books mentioned above represent various genres of fictional literature, volume 2 (Pitesamisk ordbok) is a contribution to language planning for the highly endangered Pite Sámi language and has actually contributed to gain official recognition of this written language.

== Volumes ==
- 1 Grüße aus Lappland / Nils-Aslak Valkeapää, translated by Johanna Domokos & Gruppe B^{i}. - Freiburg : Skandinavisches Seminar der Albert-Ludwigs-Universität Freiburg. 2014. ISBN 978-3-9816835-0-9
- 2 Pitesamisk ordbok : Samt stavningsregler / Joshua Wilbur (Red.) - Freiburg : Skandinavisches Seminar der Albert-Ludwigs-Universität Freiburg. 2014. ISBN 978-3-9816835-1-6
- 3 Skoltesamiske tekster fra Neiden (forthcoming)
- 4 Worte verschwinden / fliegen / zum blauen Licht : Samische Lyrik von Joik bis Rap / Johanna Domokos, Michael Rießler & Christine Schlosser (Hrsg.), translated by Christine Schlosser - Freiburg : Skandinavisches Seminar der Albert-Ludwigs-Universität Freiburg. 2019. ISBN 978-3-9816835-3-0
- 5 Johan Turi : Ein Bühnenstück mit einem Joik von Áilloš / Harald Gaski & Gunnar H. Gjengset, translated by Tatjana Krzemien, Anna-Sophia Mäder & Michael Rießler - Freiburg : Skandinavisches Seminar der Albert-Ludwigs-Universität Freiburg. 2019. ISBN 978-3-9816835-4-7
