= Cowgill's law =

Cowgill's law refers to two unrelated sound changes within Indo-European both named after Warren Cowgill, one occurring in Proto-Greek and the other in Proto-Germanic:

- Cowgill's law of Germanic
- Cowgill's law of Greek
