= George Yule (linguist) =

British linguist (born 1947)

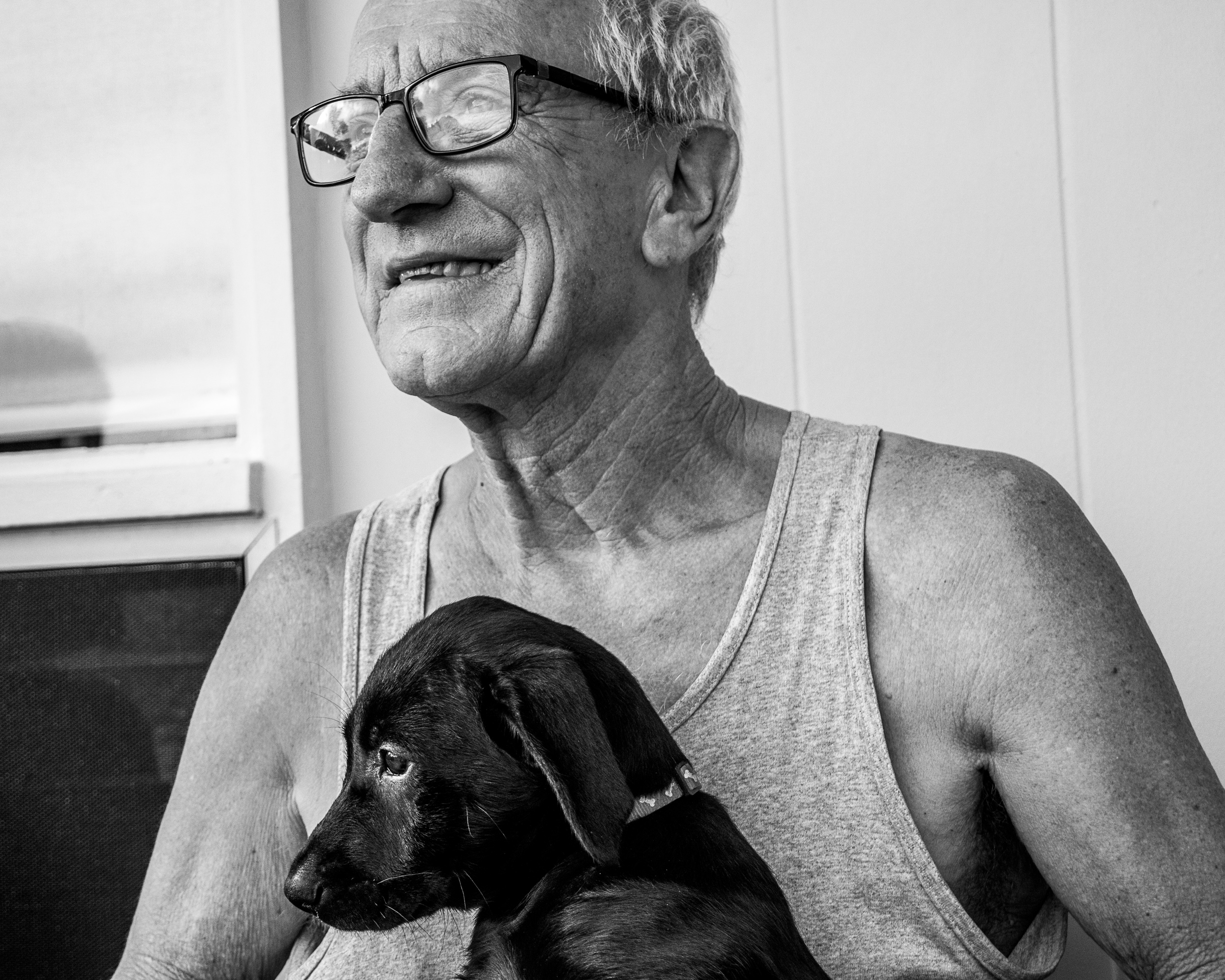
- Born: 20 March 1947 (age 79)
- Known for: Writing introductory books on linguistics

Academic background
- Education: University of Edinburgh (PhD)
- Thesis: Aspects of the information structure of spoken discourse (1981)
- Doctoral advisor: Gillian Brown
- Other advisors: Keith Brown, Jim Miller, Karen Currie de Carvalho

Academic work
- Discipline: Linguistics
- Sub-discipline: Discourse analysis, pragmatics
- Institutions: University of Minnesota; Louisiana State University; University of Hawaiʻi at Mānoa; University of Edinburgh

George Yule (born 20 March 1947) is a Scottish-American linguist. He is known for his works on pragmatics and discourse analysis.

== Life ==
George Yule was born in Stirling, Scotland in 1947, and became an American citizen in 2000. He now lives in Hawai‘i. He studied at Edinburgh University, completing an M.A. in English Language and Literature (1969), M.Sc. in Applied Linguistics (1978), and a PhD in Linguistics (1981). In his early career, he taught English in Canada, Jamaica, Saudi Arabia and Scotland. After completing his doctorate, he taught linguistics and applied linguistics at the University of Edinburgh, University of Minnesota, Louisiana State University and the University of Hawaiʻi at Mānoa. His areas of specialization are Discourse Analysis (Brown and Yule, 1983a; Overstreet and Yule, 2021) and Pragmatics (Yule, 1979; 1996). He has also carried out research and published on task-based language teaching (Brown and Yule, 1983b; Brown, Anderson, Shillcock and Yule, 1984; Tarone and Yule, 1989; Yule, 1997) and English Grammar (Yule, 1998; 2006/2019). His best-known work is an introductory textbook about language (Yule, 1985/2020).

== Selected publications ==
- Brown, G. and G. Yule (1983a) Discourse Analysis Cambridge University Press
- Brown, G. and G. Yule (1983b) Teaching the Spoken Language Cambridge University Press
- Brown, G., A. Anderson, R. Shillcock and G. Yule (1984) Teaching Talk: Strategies for Production and Assessment Cambridge University Press
- Overstreet, M. and G. Yule (2021) General Extenders The Forms and Functions of a New Linguistic Category Cambridge University Press
- Tarone, E. and G. Yule (1989) Focus on the Language Learner Oxford University Press
- Yule, G. (1979) Pragmatically controlled anaphora Lingua 49: pages 127-35
- Yule, G. (1985/2020) The Study of Language (1st/8th editions) Cambridge University Press
- Yule, G. (1996) Pragmatics Oxford University Press
- Yule, G. (1997) Referential Communication Tasks Lawrence Erlbaum
- Yule, G. (1998) Explaining English Grammar Oxford University Press
- Yule, G. (2006/2019) Oxford Practice Grammar Advanced (1st/Revised editions) Oxford University Press
