= Language (disambiguation) =

Language is the capacity for acquiring and using complex systems of communication, and a language is any specific example of such a system.

Language may also refer to:

== Publications ==
- Language (journal), a journal of the Linguistic Society of America
- Language (magazine), an avant garde poetry magazine (published 1978–1981)
- Language: An Introduction to the Study of Speech, a 1921 book by linguist Edward Sapir
- Language: Its Nature, Development, and Origin, a 1922 book by linguist Otto Jespersen
- Language (Bloomfield book), a 1933 book by linguist Leonard Bloomfield
- Language: Introductory Readings, an introductory linguistics textbook

== Music ==
- Language (Annie Crummer album), 1992
- Language (The Contortionist album), 2014
- Language (MNEK album), 2018
- "Language" (Dave Dobbyn song), 1994
- "Language" (Porter Robinson song), 2012
- "The Language" (song), a 2013 song by Drake
- "Language", a 1987 song by Suzanne Vega from Solitude Standing
- "Language", a 2019 song by Betty Who from Betty

== Other uses ==
- Bad language, a subset of a language's lexicon considered impolite or offensive
- Juan Language (born 1989), a South African rugby union player

== See also ==
- Artificial language, a language created for a specific purpose
- Formal language in mathematics or other fields, a set of strings of symbols that may be constrained by rules that are specific to it
  - Programming language, a language created for the writing of computer programs
- Natural language, a language used naturally by humans for communication
