= The Study of Language =

Book by George Yule

- Author: George Yule
- Language: English
- Subject: linguistics
- Genre: textbook
- Publisher: Cambridge
- Publication date: 1985 (1st ed), 2022 (8th ed)
- Media type: Print (hardcover)
- ISBN: 9780511757754

The Study of Language is a textbook by George Yule in which the author provides an introduction to linguistics. It is described as a "highly influential and widely used introductory text on linguistics."

== Reception ==
The book was reviewed by Innhwa Park, Sheila M. Embleton and Dan Liu. It also received short reviews from Nigel Musk (University of Linkoping), Stephen Matthews (University of Hong Kong) and Elise Morse-Gagne (Tougaloo College).

== See also ==
- Language: Introductory Readings
