= Cowgill's law (Greek) =

Proto-Greek sound law

In Ancient Greek, Cowgill's law says that a former /o/ vowel becomes /u/ between a resonant (/r/, /l/, /m/, /n/) and a labial consonant (including labiovelars), in either order. It is named after the American Indo-Europeanist Warren Cowgill.

Examples:

- Ancient Greek: νύξ 'night' < PIE *nokʷts (cf. Latin: nox, Vedic nák < *nakts, Gothic: nahts, gen. sg. Hittite: nekuz)
- Ancient Greek: φύλλον 'leaf' < PIE *bʰolyom (cf. Latin: folium)
- Ancient Greek: μύλη 'mill' < PIE *mol-eh₂- (cf. Latin: molīna)
- Ancient Greek: ὄνυξ 'nail' (stem Proto-Greek: *ónukh-) < early PG *onokʷʰ- < PIE *h₃nogʷʰ- (cf. Old English: nægl < PGerm *nag-laz)

Note that when a labiovelar adjoins an /o/ affected by Cowgill's law, the new /u/ will cause the labiovelar to lose its labial component (as in Greek: núks and Greek: ónuks/ónukh-, where the usual Greek change *kʷ > *p has not occurred).

Counterexamples:

Attic Greek: ὄνομα 'name' alongside expected Doric and Aeolic ὄνυμα.

== See also ==
- Glossary of sound laws in the Indo-European languages
