= Cowgill's law (Germanic) =

Proto-Germanic sound law

Cowgill's law says that a PIE laryngeal /h₃/, and possibly /h₂/, turns into /k/ in Proto-Germanic when directly preceded by a sonorant and followed by /w/. This law is named after Indo-Europeanist Warren Cowgill.

This law is still controversial, although increasingly accepted. Donald Ringe (2006) "tentatively" accepts it; Andrew Sihler (1995) is noncommittal.

Examples are fairly few:

- Proto-Germanic *kwikwaz "alive" (whence English quick) < PIE *gʷih₃-wós (cf. Latin: vīvus, Sanskrit: jīvás)
- Proto-Germanic *unki acc. du. "us two" (cf. Gothic: unkis, Old English: unc, Old Norse: okkr) < PIE *n̥h₃wé (cf. Greek: nṓ; Ved. āvā́m acc. du. "us two" < *āva-ám)
- Possibly Old English: tācor "husband's brother" < PIE *dayh₂wḗr (cf. Greek: dāḗr, Ved. devṛ́, Latin: lēvir)

The first two examples, however, have good alternative explanations which don't involve Cowgill's law:

- Proto-Germanic *kwikwaz < PIE *gʷi-gʷh₃-(w)ó-.
- Proto-Germanic *unki < PIE *n̥h₁ ge acc./dat. du. "us two at least" (other accusative personal pronouns may have been built the same way: Proto-Germanic *miki acc. sg. "me", *þiki acc. sg. "you (sg.)", and *inki acc./dat. du. "you two" ).

If the sound law becomes generally accepted, the relative chronology of this law could have consequences for the possible reconstructed phonetic values of /h₂/ and /h₃/. If it occurred before Grimm's law, then its immediate output must have been /g/, as /k/ would have become /x/ by Grimm's law. This would have been more likely if the affected laryngeals were voiced velar obstruents to begin with. Ringe does believe that Cowgill's Law applied before Grimm's, but his reasoning relies on the 'brother-in-law' example (and thus the conclusion about the laryngeals being voiced would apply to /h₂/ as much as /h₃/). If that example is considered invalid, he admits that either relative chronology is then possible.

== History ==
Hirt (1931) observed that PIE *w was reflected as *k in a handful of words in Germanic, but was unable to explain the phenomenon. Austin (1946, 1958) attributed this to the presence of a preceding laryngeal, and proposed many additional examples, which have been described as "questionable" by Ringe. His version of the law applied to any laryngeal, and to *y as well as *w, but also required the laryngeal to be preceded by an accented vowel; when an unaccented vowel preceded, he believed Holtzmann's law would apply instead.

Cowgill (1965) accepted Austin's hypothesis in a modified form, stating it as applicable to *w only, and describing the conditioning as 'not yet fully worked out'. He mentioned only two examples, the words for 'alive' and 'us two'; the former, but not the latter, had already been mentioned by Austin. Katz (1998) accepted 'us two' as an example and explained its development in greater detail. The term "Cowgill's Law" was used by Ringe (2006); others have referred to it as "laryngeal hardening", e.g. Stiles (2017).

== See also ==
- Glossary of sound laws in the Indo-European languages
