= Sigmund Feist =

German Jewish pedagogue and historical linguist (1865–1943)

Sigmund Feist (Mainz, 12 June 1865 – Copenhagen, 23 March 1943) was a German Jewish pedagogue and historical linguist. He was the author of the Germanic substrate hypothesis as well as a number of important works concerning Jewish ethnic and racial identity. Feist served as the director of the Jewish Reichenheim Orphanage in Berlin from 1906 to 1935. In 1907 he became a member of the Gesellschaft der Freunde society.

Feist emigrated to Denmark in 1939 where he died four years later.

== Correspondence with Jewish soldiers during World War I ==
As director of the Reichenheim Orphanage, Feist established and maintained close relationships with his wards, 77 of whom corresponded with him during their time of service in the First World War. The correspondence consists of 745 letters which Feist received between the years 1914 and 1918, and offers a glimpse into the lives of Jewish soldiers who served in World War I.

Several of the soldiers who wrote the letters later went on to attain notoriety in academic circles, an example being Hermann Teuchert.

The collected correspondence has been archived in the Centrum Judaicum of the New Synagogue in Berlin since 1995. The letters were published as a collection in 2002.

== Important works ==
=== Works in historical linguistics ===
- Einführung in das Gotische (1922)
- Etymologisches Wörterbuch der gotischen Sprache (1923)
- Vergleichendes Wörterbuch der Gotischen Sprache mit Einschluss des Krimgotischen und sonstiger zerstreuter Überreste des Gotischen (1923)
- Indogermanen und Germanen (1924)
- Germanen und Kelten in der antiken Überlieferung (1925)

=== Works in Jewish history and ethnicity ===
- Stammeskunde der Juden. Die jüdischen Stämme der Erde in alter und neuer Zeit. Historisch-anthropologische Skizzen. (1925)
- Die Ethnographie der Juden (with Lionel S. Reisz) (1926)
- Rassenkunde des jüdischen Volkes (1930)
- Ein Zeitgenosse Alexander des Großen über die Juden (?)

== Referenced in ==
- Bibliography for Wulfila database: Feist, Sigmund. Vergleichendes Wörterbuch der Gotischen Sprache Mit Einschluss des Krimgotischen und sonstiger zerstreuter Überreste des Gotischen. Dritte neubearbeitete und vermehrte Auflage E. J. Brill Leiden 1939
- An Analysis of *z loss in West Germanic
- "Studying the Jew"
- Listed in The Encyclopedia of Language and Linguistics

== Related literature ==
- Römer, Ruth: Sigmund Feist und die Gesellschaft fuer deutsche Philologie in Berlin. In: Muttersprache 103 (1993), 28-40
- Römer, Ruth: Sigmund Feist: Deutscher – Germanist – Jude. In: Muttersprache 91 (1981), 249-308.
