= Proto-Germanic language =

Ancestor of the Germanic languages

Proto-Germanic
- PGmc, Common Germanic
- Reconstruction of: Germanic languages
- Region: Northwestern Europe
- Era: c. 500 BC–AD 200
- Reconstructed ancestor: Proto-Indo-European
- Lower-order reconstructions: Proto-West Germanic; Proto-Norse (attested); Proto-East Germanic

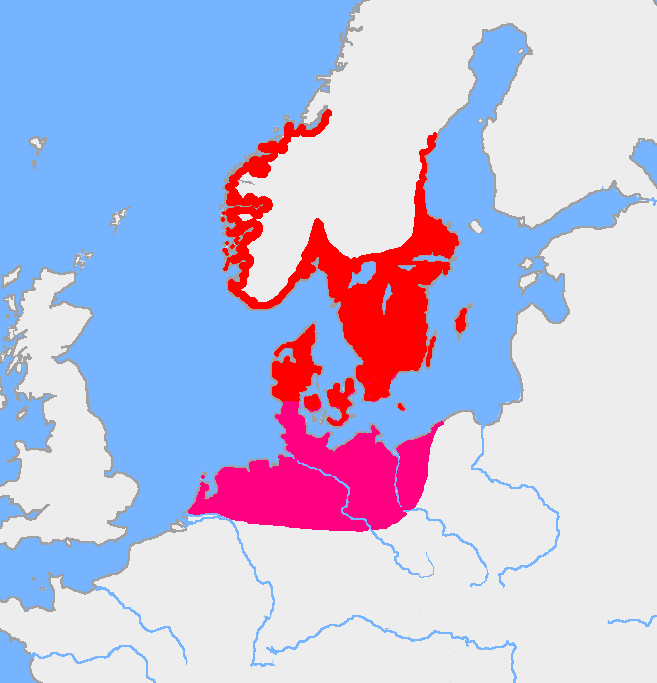
Map of the pre-Roman Iron Age in Northern Europe showing cultures associated with Proto-Germanic, c. 500 BC. The area of the preceding Nordic Bronze Age in Scandinavia is shown in red; magenta areas towards the south represent the Jastorf culture of the North German Plain.

Proto-Germanic (abbreviated PGmc; also called Common Germanic) is the reconstructed common ancestor of the Germanic languages.

A defining feature of Proto-Germanic is the completion of the process described by Grimm's law (also known as the First Germanic Sound Shift), a set of sound changes that occurred during its gradual divergence from Proto-Indo-European.

The Proto-Germanic language is not directly attested and has been reconstructed using the comparative method with other more archaic and earlier attested Indo-European languages, (Note: One third of the vocabulary of the Germanic languages is of non-Indo-European origin.) extremely early Germanic loanwords in Baltic and Finnish languages (for example, Finnish kuningas 'king'), early runic inscriptions (specifically the Vimose inscriptions in Denmark, dated to the 2nd century CE), and in Roman Empire era transcriptions of individual words (notably in Tacitus's Germania, c. AD 90 (Note: This includes common nouns such as framea (a type of spear), mythological characters such as Mannus and tribal names such as Ingaevones.)). The non-runic Negau helmet inscription, dated to the 2nd century BCE, has also been argued by some to represent the earliest attestation of Grimm's law.

== Archaeology and early historiography ==
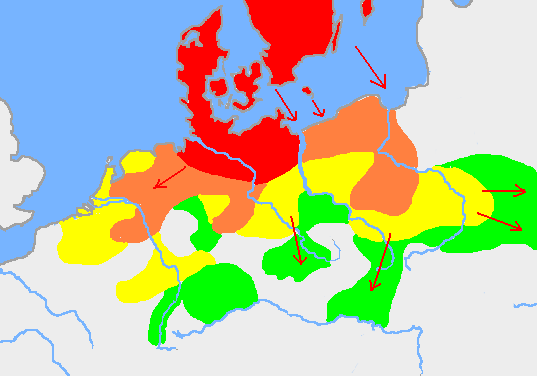
Expansion of early Germanic tribes into previously mostly Celtic Central Europe: Settlements before 750 BC New settlements by 500 BC New settlements by 250 BC New settlements by AD 1 Some sources also give a date of 750 BC for the earliest expansion out of southern Scandinavia and northern Germany along the North Sea coast towards the mouth of the Rhine.

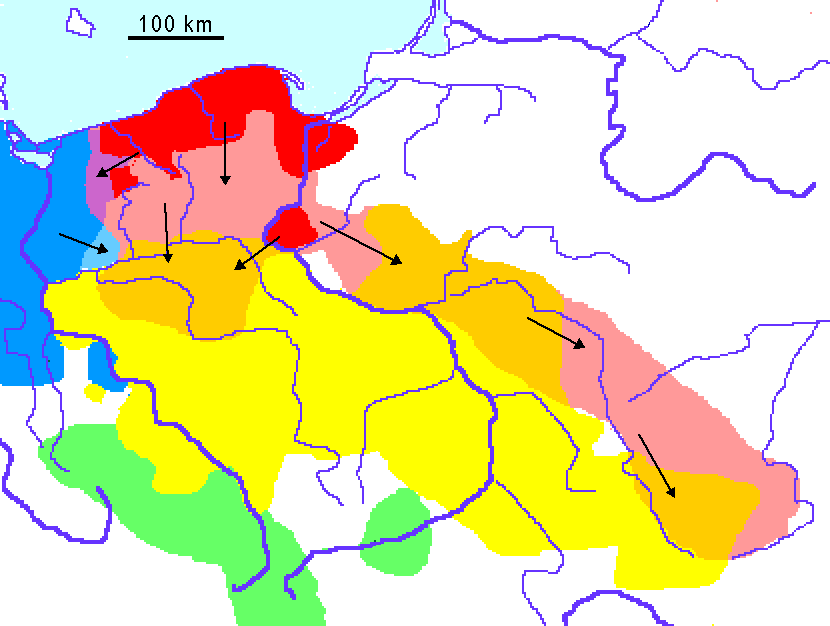
The early East Germanic expansion (1st and 2nd centuries AD): Jastorf culture Oksywie culture Przeworsk culture Eastward expansion of the Wielbark culture

Proto-Germanic developed out of pre-Proto-Germanic during the Pre-Roman Iron Age of Northern Europe. According to the Germanic substrate hypothesis, it may have been influenced by non-Indo-European cultures, such as the Funnelbeaker culture, but the sound change in the Germanic languages known as Grimm's law points to a non-substratic development away from other branches of Indo-European. (Note: It is open to debate whether the bearers of the Neolithic Funnelbeaker culture or the Pitted Ware culture should also be considered Indo-European) Proto-Germanic itself was likely spoken after c. 500 BC, and Proto-Norse, from the second century AD and later, is still quite close to reconstructed Proto-Germanic, but other common innovations separating Germanic from Proto-Indo-European suggest a common history of pre-Proto-Germanic speakers throughout the Nordic Bronze Age.

The Proto-Germanic language developed in southern Scandinavia (Denmark, south Sweden and southern Norway) and the northern-most part of Germany in Schleswig Holstein and northern Lower Saxony, the Urheimat (original home) of the Germanic tribes. It is possible that Indo-European speakers first arrived in southern Scandinavia with the Corded Ware culture in the mid-3rd millennium BC, developing into the Nordic Bronze Age cultures by the early second millennium BC. In contrast, according to Mallory, Germanicists "generally agree" that the Urheimat ('original homeland') of the Proto-Germanic language, the ancestral idiom of all attested Germanic dialects, was primarily situated in an area corresponding to the extent of the Jastorf culture in what is now Germany. (Note: Ringe (2017), p. 85: "Early Jastorf, at the end of the seventh century BCE, is almost certainly too early for the last common ancestor of the attested languages; but later Jastorf culture and its successors occupy so much territory that their populations are most unlikely to have spoken a single dialect, even granting that the expansion of the culture was relatively rapid. It follows that our reconstructed PGmc was only one of the dialects spoken by peoples identified archeologically, or by the Romans, as 'Germans'; the remaining Germanic peoples spoke sister dialects of PGmc." Polomé (1992), p. 51: "...if the Jastorf culture and, probably, the neighboring Harpstedt culture to the west constitute the Germanic homeland (Mallory 1989: 87), a spread of Proto-Germanic northwards and eastwards would have to be assumed, which might explain both the archaisms and the innovative features of North Germanic and East Germanic, and would fit nicely with recent views locating the homeland of the Goths in Poland.")

Early Germanic expansion in the Pre-Roman Iron Age (fifth to first centuries BC) placed Proto-Germanic speakers in contact with the Continental Celtic La Tène horizon. A number of Celtic loanwords in Proto-Germanic have been identified. By the first century AD, Germanic expansion reached the Danube and the Upper Rhine in the south and the Germanic peoples first entered the historical record. At about the same time, extending east of the Vistula (Oksywie culture, Przeworsk culture), Germanic speakers came into contact with early Slavic cultures, as reflected in early Germanic loans in Proto-Slavic.

By the third century, Germanic speakers had expanded over significant distance, from the Rhine to the Dniepr spanning about 1,200 km (700 mi).

The earliest attested stage of the Germanic languages is known as Proto-Norse, variably dated to the 2nd century AD, around 300 AD or the first century AD in runic inscriptions (such as the Tune Runestone).

The first coherent text recorded in a Germanic language is the Gothic Bible, written in the later fourth century in the East Germanic variety of the Thervingi Gothic Christians, who had escaped persecution by moving from Scythia to Moesia in 348. Early West Germanic text is available from the fifth century, beginning with the Frankish Bergakker runic inscription.

== Evolution ==
The evolution of Proto-Germanic from its ancestral forms, beginning with its ancestor Proto-Indo-European, began with the development of a separate common way of speech among some geographically nearby speakers of a prior language and ended with the dispersion of the proto-language speakers into distinct populations with mostly independent speech habits. Between the two points, many sound changes occurred.

=== Theories of phylogeny ===
==== Solutions ====
Phylogeny as applied to historical linguistics involves the evolutionary descent of languages. The phylogeny problem is the question of what specific tree, in the tree model of language evolution, best explains the paths of descent of all the members of a language family from a common language, or proto-language (at the root of the tree) to the attested languages (at the leaves of the tree). The Germanic languages form a tree with Proto-Germanic at its root that is a branch of the Indo-European tree, which in turn has Proto-Indo-European at its root. Borrowing of lexical items from contact languages makes the relative position of the Germanic branch within Indo-European less clear than the positions of the other branches of Indo-European. In the course of the development of historical linguistics, various solutions have been proposed, none certain and all debatable.

In the evolutionary history of a language family, philologists consider a genetic "tree model" appropriate only if communities do not remain in effective contact as their languages diverge. Early Indo-European had limited contact between distinct lineages, and, uniquely, the Germanic subfamily exhibited a less treelike behaviour, as some of its characteristics were acquired from neighbours early in its evolution rather than from its direct ancestors. The internal diversification of West Germanic developed in an especially non-treelike manner.

Proto-Germanic is generally agreed to have begun about 500 BC. Its hypothetical ancestor between the end of Proto-Indo-European and 500 BC is termed Pre-Proto-Germanic. Whether it is to be included under a wider meaning of Proto-Germanic is a matter of usage.

Winfred P. Lehmann regarded Jacob Grimm's "First Germanic Sound Shift", or Grimm's law, and Verner's law, (which pertained mainly to consonants and were considered for many decades to have generated Proto-Germanic) as pre-Proto-Germanic and held that the "upper boundary" (that is, the earlier boundary) was the fixing of the accent, or stress, on the root syllable of a word, typically on the first syllable. Proto-Indo-European had featured a moveable pitch-accent consisting of "an alternation of high and low tones" as well as stress of position determined by a set of rules based on the lengths of a word's syllables.

The fixation of the stress led to sound changes in unstressed syllables. For Lehmann, the "lower boundary" was the dropping of final -a or -e in unstressed syllables; for example, post-PIE *wóyd-e > Gothic wait, 'knows'. Elmer H. Antonsen agreed with Lehmann about the upper boundary but later found runic evidence that the -a was not dropped: ékwakraz ... wraita, 'I, Wakraz, … wrote (this)'. He says: "We must therefore search for a new lower boundary for Proto-Germanic."

Antonsen's own scheme divides Proto-Germanic into an early stage and a late stage. The early stage includes the stress fixation and resulting "spontaneous vowel-shifts" while the late stage is defined by ten complex rules governing changes of both vowels and consonants.

=== Phonological stages from Proto-Indo-European to end of Proto-Germanic ===
The following changes are known or presumed to have occurred in the history of Proto-Germanic in the wider sense from the end of Proto-Indo-European up to the point that Proto-Germanic began to break into mutually unintelligible dialects. The changes are listed roughly in chronological order, with changes that operate on the outcome of earlier ones appearing later in the list. The stages distinguished and the changes associated with each stage rely heavily on Ringe 2006, who in turn summarizes standard concepts and terminology.

==== Pre-Proto-Germanic (Pre-PGmc) ====
This stage began with the separation of a distinct speech, perhaps while it still formed part of the Proto-Indo-European dialect continuum. It contained many innovations that were shared with other Indo-European branches to various degrees, probably through areal contacts, and mutual intelligibility with other dialects would remain for some time. It was nevertheless on its own path, whether dialect or language.

Allophonic colouring of */e/ adjacent to laryngeal consonants:
- */h₂e/ > */h₂a/ — *h₂énti 'in front' > *h₂ánti > *andi 'in addition'
- */eh₂/ > */ah₂/ — *meh₂tḗr 'mother' > *mah₂tḗr > *mōdēr
- */h₃e/ > */h₃o/ — *h₃érō 'eagle' > *h₃órō > *arô
- */eh₃/ > */oh₃/ — *bʰléh₃mō 'flower' > *bʰlóh₃mō > *blōmô
Merging of PIE "palatovelar" and "velar" plosives ("centumization"):
- */ḱ/ > */k/ — *ḱm̥tóm 'hundred' > *km̥tóm > *hundą
- */ǵ/ > */g/ — *wérǵom 'work' > *wérgom > *werką
- */ǵʰ/ > */gʰ/ — *ǵʰh₁yéti 'to go, walk' > *gʰh₁yéti > *gaiþi
- The actual pronunciation of the "palatovelar" and "velar" series is not reconstructible; it may be that the "palatovelars" were actually plain velars, and the "velars" were pronounced even farther back (post-velar or uvular) so it may be more accurate to say that, for example, */k/ > */ḱ/. Some also claim that the two series may not even have been distinct in PIE. See centum and satem languages.
Epenthesis of */u/ before the syllabic sonorants:
- */m̥/ > */um/ — *ḱm̥tóm 'hundred' > *kumtóm > *hundą
- */n̥/ > */un/ — *n̥tér 'inside' > *untér > *under 'among'
- */l̥/ > */ul/ — *wĺ̥kʷos 'wolf' > *wúlkʷos > *wulfaz
- */r̥/ > */ur/ — *wŕ̥mis 'worm' > *wúrmis > *wurmiz
An epenthetic */s/ was inserted already in PIE after dental consonants when they were followed by a suffix beginning with a dental.
- This sequence now becomes */TsT/ > */ts/ > */ss/ — *wid-tós 'known' (pronounced *widstos) > *witstós > *wissós > *wissaz 'certain'
Geminate consonants are shortened after a consonant or a long vowel — *káyd-tis 'act of calling' (pronounced *káydstis) > *káyssis > *káysis > *haisiz 'command'
Word-final long vowels are lengthened to "overlong" vowels — *séh₁mō 'seeds' > *séh₁mô > *sēmô
Loss of laryngeals, phonemicising the allophones of */e/:
- Word-initial laryngeals are lost before a consonant — *h₁dóntm̥ 'tooth, acc.' > *dóntum > *tanþų
- Laryngeals are lost before vowels — *h₁ésti 'is' > *ésti > *isti
- Laryngeals are lost after vowels but lengthen the preceding vowel: */VH/ > */Vː/ — *séh₁mō 'seeds' > *sēmô
  - Two vowels that come to stand in hiatus because of that change contract into an overlong vowel — *-oHom 'genitive plural' > *-ôm > *-ǫ̂; *-eh₂es 'eh₂-stem nom. pl.' > *-âs > *-ôz
  - In word-final position, the resulting long vowels remain distinct from (shorter than) the overlong vowels that were formed from PIE word-final long vowels — *-oh₂ 'thematic 1st sg.' > *-ō
- Laryngeals remain between consonants.
Cowgill's law: */h₃/ (and possibly */h₂/) is strengthened to */g/ between a sonorant and */w/ — *gʷih₃wós 'alive' > *gʷigwós > *kwikwaz
Vocalisation of remaining laryngeals: */H/ > */ə/ — *ph₂tḗr 'father' > *pətḗr > *fadēr; *sámh₂dʰos 'sand' > *sámədʰos > *samdaz
Velars are labialised by following */w/: *éḱwos 'horse' > *ékwos > *ékʷos > *ehwaz
Labiovelars are delabialised next to */u/ (or */un/) or before */t/:
- */kʷ/ > */k/ — *nókʷts 'night' > *nókts > *nahts
- */gʷ/ > */g/ — *gʷémtis ~ *gʷm̥téys 'step, act of walking' > *gʷumtís > *gumtís > *kumþiz 'coming, arrival'
- */gʷʰ/ > */gʰ/ — *gʷʰéntis ~ *gʷʰn̥tís 'killing' > *gʷʰuntís > *gʰuntís > *gunþiz 'battle'
- This rule continued to operate into the Proto-Germanic period.

==== Early Proto-Germanic ====
This stage began its evolution as a dialect of Proto-Indo-European that had lost its laryngeals and had five long and six short vowels as well as one or two overlong vowels. The consonant system was still that of PIE minus palatovelars and laryngeals, but the loss of syllabic resonants already made the language markedly different from PIE proper. Mutual intelligibility might have still existed with other descendants of PIE, but it would have been strained, and the period marked the definitive break of Germanic from the other Indo-European languages and the beginning of Germanic proper, containing most of the sound changes that are now held to define this branch distinctively. This stage contained various consonant and vowel shifts, the loss of the contrastive accent inherited from PIE for a uniform accent on the first syllable of the word root, and the beginnings of the reduction of the resulting unstressed syllables.

Loss of word-final non-high short vowels */e/, */a/, */o/ — *wóyde '(s)he knows' > *wóyd > *wait
- A */j/ or */w/ preceding the vowel is also lost — *tósyo 'of that' > *tós > *þas
- Single-syllable words were not affected, but clitics were — *-kʷe 'and' > *-kʷ > *-hw
- When the lost vowel was accented, the accent shifted to the preceding syllable — *n̥smé 'us' > *n̥swé > *unswé > *úns > *uns (not *unz, showing that loss occurred before Verner's law)
Grimm's law: Chain shift of the three series of plosives. Voiced plosives had already been devoiced before a voiceless obstruent prior to this stage. Labiovelars were delabialised before */t/.
- Voiceless plosives become fricatives, unless preceded by another obstruent. In a sequence of two voiceless obstruents, the second obstruent remains a plosive.
  - */p/ > */ɸ/ (*f) — *ph₂tḗr 'father' > *pətḗr > *faþḗr > *fadēr
  - */t/ > */θ/ (*þ) — *tód 'that' > *þód > *þat
  - */k/ > */x/ (*h) — *kátus 'fight' > *háþus > *haþuz; *h₂eǵs- 'axle' > (devoicing) *aks- > *ahs- > *ahsō
  - */kʷ/ > */xʷ/ (*hw) — *kʷód 'what' > *hʷód > *hwat
  - Since the second of two obstruents is unaffected, the sequences */sp/, */st/, */sk/, and */skʷ/ remain.
  - The above also forms the Germanic spirant law:
    - */bt/, */bʰt/, */pt/ > */ɸt/ — *kh₂ptós 'grabbed' > *kəptós > *həftós > *haftaz 'captive'
    - */gt/, */gʰt/, */kt/ > */xt/ — *oḱtṓw 'eight' > *oktṓw > *ohtṓw > *ahtōu
    - */gʷt/, */gʷʰt/, */kʷt/ > */xt/ — *nokʷtm̥ 'night, acc.' > *noktum > *nohtum > *nahtų
- Voiced plosives are devoiced:
  - */b/ > */p/ — *h₂ébōl 'apple' > *ápōl > *aplaz (reformed as a-stem)
  - */d/ > */t/ — *h₁dóntm̥ 'tooth, acc.' > *tónþum > *tanþų; *kʷód 'what' > *hʷód > *hwat
  - */g/ > */k/ — *wérǵom 'work' > *wérgom > *wérkom > *werką
  - */gʷ/ > */kʷ/ — *gʷémeti '(s)he will step, subj.' > *kʷémeþi > *kwimidi '(s)he comes'
- Aspirated plosives become voiced plosives or fricatives (see below):
  - */bʰ/ > */b/ (*[b,β between vowels]) — *bʰéreti '(s)he is carrying' > *béreþi > *biridi
  - */dʰ/ > */d/ (*[d,ð between vowels]) — *dʰóh₁mos 'thing put' > *dṓmos > *dōmaz 'judgement'
  - */gʰ/ > */g/ (*[g,ɣ between vowels, possibly word initially]) — *gʰáns 'goose' > *gáns > *gans
  - */gʷʰ/ > */gʷ/ (*[gʷ,ɣʷ between vowels, and possibly word-initially]) — *sóngʷʰos 'chant' > *sóngʷos > *sangwaz 'song'
Verner's law: Voiceless fricatives are voiced when preceded by an unaccented vowel, including cases where the vowel and fricative are separated by a sonorant (/n, m, r, l, j, w). This allophonic voicing became phonemic only after the regularization of stress placement (see below).
- */ɸ/ > *[β] — *upéri 'over' > *uféri > *ubéri > *ubiri
- */θ/ > *[ð] — *tewtéh₂ 'tribe' > *þewþā́ > *þewdā́ > *þeudō
- */x/ > *[ɣ] — *h₂yuHn̥ḱós 'young' > *yunkós > *yunhós > *yungós > *jungaz (with -z by analogy)
- */xʷ/ > *[ɣʷ] — *kʷekʷléh₂ 'wheels (collective)' > *hʷehʷlā́ > *hʷegʷlā́ > *hweulō
- */s/ > *[z] — *h₁régʷeses 'of darkness' > *rékʷeses > *rékʷezez > *rikwiziz; *kʷékʷlos 'wheel' > *hʷéhʷlos > *hʷéhʷloz > *hwehwlaz
- Some small words that were generally unaccented were also affected — *h₁ésmi, unstressed *h₁esmi 'I am' > *esmi > *ezmi > *immi; *h₁sénti, unstressed *h₁senti 'they are' > *senþi > *sendi > *sindi (the stressed variants, which would have become *ismi and *sinþi, were lost)
All words become stressed on their first syllable. The PIE contrastive accent is lost, phonemicising the voicing distinction created by Verner's law.
Word-initial */gʷ/ > */b/ — *gʷʰédʰyeti "(s)he is asking for" > *gʷédyedi > *bédyedi > *bidiþi "(s)he asks, (s)he prays" (with -þ- by analogy)
Unstressed */owo/ > */oː/ — *-owos 'thematic first du.' > *-ōz
Unstressed */ew/ > */ow/ before a consonant or word-finally — *-ews 'u-stem gen. sg.' > *-owz > *-auz
Unstressed */e/ > */i/ except before */r/ — *-éteh₂ 'abstract noun suffix' > *-eþā > *-iþā > *-iþō
- Unstressed */ej/ contracts to */iː/ — *-éys 'i-stem gen. sg.' > *-iys > *-īs > *-īz (with -z by analogy)
- */e/ before */r/ later becomes */ɑ/ but not until after the application of i-mutation.
- Some words that could be unstressed as a whole were also affected, often creating stressed/unstressed pairs — *éǵh₂ 'I' > *ek > unstressed *ik (remaining beside stressed *ek)
Unstressed */ji/ > */i/ — *légʰyeti '(s)he is lying down' ~ *légʰyonti 'they are lying down' > *legyidi ~ *legyondi > *legidi ~ *legyondi > *ligiþi ~ *ligjanþi (with -þ- by analogy)
- The process creates diphthongs from originally disyllabic sequences — *-oyend 'thematic optative 3pl' > *-oyint > *-oint > *-ain; *áyeri 'in the morning' > *ayiri > *airi 'early'; *tréyes 'three' > *þreyiz > *þreiz > *þrīz
- The sequence */iji/ becomes */iː/ — *gʰósteyes 'strangers, nom. pl.' > *gostiyiz > *gostīz > *gastīz 'guests'
Merging of non-high back vowels:
- */o/, */a/ > */ɑ/ (*a) — *gʰóstis 'stranger' > *gostiz > *gastiz 'guest'; *kápros 'he-goat' > *hafraz
- */oː/, */aː/ > */ɑː/ (*ā) — *dʰóh₁mos 'thing put' > *dōmoz > *dāmaz > *dōmaz 'judgement'; *swéh₂dus 'sweet' > *swātuz > *swōtuz
- */oːː/, */aːː/ > */ɑːː/ (*â) — *séh₁mō 'seeds' > *sēmô > *sēmâ > *sēmô; *-eh₂es 'eh₂-stem nom. pl.' > *-âz > *-ôz

==== Late Proto-Germanic ====
By this stage, Germanic had emerged as a distinctive branch and had undergone many of the sound changes that would make its later descendants recognisable as Germanic languages. It had shifted its consonant inventory from a system that was rich in plosives to one containing primarily fricatives, had lost the PIE mobile pitch accent for a predictable stress accent, and had merged two of its vowels. The stress accent had already begun to cause the erosion of unstressed syllables, which would continue in its descendants. The final stage of the language included the remaining development until the breakup into dialects and, most notably, featured the development of nasal vowels and the start of umlaut, another characteristic Germanic feature.

Word-final */m/ > */n/ — *tóm 'that, acc. masc.' > *þam > *þan 'then'; *-om 'a-stem acc. sg.' > *-am > *-an > *-ą
*/m/ > */n/ before dental consonants — *ḱm̥tóm 'hundred' > *humdan > *hundan > *hundą; *déḱm̥d 'ten' > *tehumt > *tehunt > *tehun
Word-final */n/ is lost after unstressed syllables, and the preceding vowel is nasalised — *-om 'a-stem acc. sg.' > *-am > *-an > *-ą; *-eh₂m > *-ān > *-ą̄ > *-ǭ; *-oHom 'genitive plural' > *-ân > *-ą̂ > *-ǫ̂
Nasal */ẽː/ is lowered to */ɑ̃ː/ — *dʰédʰeh₁m 'I was putting' > *dedēn > *dedę̄ > *dedą̄ > *dedǭ
Elimination of */ə/:
- Unstressed */ə/ is lost between consonants — *sámh₂dʰos 'sand' > *samədaz > *samdaz; *takéh₁- 'to be silent' > (with added suffix) *takəyónti 'they are silent' > *þagəyanþi > *þagyanþi > *þagjanþi
- */ə/ > */ɑ/ elsewhere — *ph₂tḗr 'father' > *fədēr > *fadēr; *takéh₁- 'to be silent' > (with added suffix) *takəyéti '(s)he is silent' > *þagəyiþi > *þagəiþi > *þagaiþi
Assimilation of sonorants:
- */nw/ > */nn/ — *ténh₂us 'thin' ~ fem. *tn̥h₂éwih₂ > *tn̥h₂ús ~ *tn̥h₂wíh₂ > *þunus ~ *þunwī > *þunus ~ *þunnī > *þunnuz ~ *þunnī
- */ln/ > */ll/ — *pl̥h₁nós 'full' > *pulnos > *fullaz. This development postdated contact with the Samic languages, as is shown by the loanword *pulna > Proto-Samic *polnē 'hill(ock), mound'.
- */zm/ > */mm/ — *h₁esmi 'I am, unstr.' > *ezmi > *emmi > *immi
Loss of word-final */t/ after unstressed syllables — *déḱm̥d 'ten' > *tehunt > *tehun; *bʰéroyd '(s)he would carry, subj.' > *berayt > *berai; *mélid ~ *mélit- 'honey' > *melit ~ *melid- > *meli ~ *melid- > *mili ~ *milid-
*/ɣʷ/ > */w/, sometimes */ɣ/ — *snóygʷʰos 'snow' > *snaygʷaz > *snaiwaz; *gʷʰréndʰonom 'to crush' > *gwrendaną > *grindaną
- This effectively turns *[gʷ] from an allophone of */ɣʷ/ into its own phoneme
Long a is raised:
- */ɑː/ > */ɔː/ — *dʰóh₁mos 'thing put' > *dāmaz > *dōmaz 'judgement'; *swéh₂dus 'sweet' > *swātuz > *swōtuz
- */ɑːː/ > */ɔːː/ — *séh₁mō 'seeds' > *sēmâ > *sēmô; *-eh₂es 'eh₂-stem nom. pl.' > *-âz > *-ôz
- That followed the earliest contact with the Romans since Latin Rōmānī was borrowed as *Rūmānīz and then shifted to *Rūmōnīz.
- Finnic loanwords preceding the change are also known:
  - Finnish hake- 'to seek', from early Proto-Germanic *sākija- (later *sōkija-)
  - Finnish raha 'money', from early Proto-Germanic *skrahā 'squirrel skin' (later *skrahō)
  - Finnish kavio 'hoof', from Pre-Proto-Germanic *kāpa- 'hoof' (later *hōfa-)
  - Finnish lieka 'tether', from Pre-Proto-Germanic *lēgā- 'to lie, be at rest' (later *lēgō-, as demonstrated by the later loan lieko 'windfallen or decayed tree')
Early i-mutation: */e/ > */i/ when followed by */i/ or */j/ in the same or next syllable — *bʰéreti '(s)he is carrying' > *beridi > *biridi; *médʰyos 'middle' > *medjaz > *midjaz; *néwios 'new' > *newjaz > *niwjaz
- This eliminates the remaining */ei/, changing it to */iː/ — *deywós 'god' > *teiwaz (attested as teiva- in the Negau helmet) > *Tīwaz 'Týr'; *tréyes 'three' > *þreiz > *þrīz
- A number of loanwords in the Finnic and Samic demonstrate earlier *e, e.g.
  - Finnish teljo 'thwart', from early Proto-Germanic *þeljō (later *þiljō)
  - Finnish menninkäinen 'goblin', from early Proto-Germanic *menþingō (later *minþingō)
  - Northern Sami deahkki 'thick meat', from early Proto-Germanic *þekkwiz 'thick' (later *þikkwiz)
  - Northern Sami jievja 'white (of animal, or hair)', from early Proto-Germanic *heują (later *hiują)
*/e/ > */i/ when followed by a syllable-final nasal — *en 'in' > *in; *séngʷʰeti '(s)he chants' > *sengʷidi > *singwidi '(s)he sings'
- Finnic loanwords demonstrating earlier *e are again known: Finnish rengas 'ring', from early Proto-Germanic *hrengaz (later *hringaz)
*/j/ is lost between vowels except after */i/ and */w/ (but it is lost after syllabic */u/). The two vowels that come to stand in hiatus then contract to long vowels or diphthongs — *-oyh₁m̥ 'thematic optative 1sg sg.' > *-oyum > *-ayų > *-aų; *h₂eyeri 'in the morning' > *ayiri > *airi 'early'
- This process creates a new */ɑː/ from earlier */ɑjɑ/ — *steh₂- 'to stand' > (with suffix added) *sth₂yónti 'they stand' > *stayanþi > *stānþi
*/n/ is lost before */x/, causing compensatory lengthening and nasalisation of the preceding vowel — *ḱónketi '(s)he hangs' > *hanhidi (phonetically *[ˈxɑ̃ːxiði])

=== Lexical evidence in other language varieties ===
Loans into Proto-Germanic from other (known) languages or from Proto-Germanic into other languages can be dated relative to each other by which Germanic sound laws have acted on them. Since the dates of borrowings and sound laws are not precisely known, it is not possible to use loans to establish absolute or calendar chronology.

==== Loans from adjoining Indo-European groups ====
Most loans from Celtic appear to have been made before or during the Germanic Sound Shift. For instance, one specimen *rīks 'ruler' was borrowed from Celtic *rīxs 'king' (stem *rīg-), with g → k. It is clearly not native because PIE **ē → *ī is typical not of Germanic but of Celtic languages. Another is *walhaz 'foreigner; Celt' from the Celtic tribal name Volcae with k → h and o → a. Other likely Celtic loans include *ambahtaz 'servant', *brunjǭ 'mailshirt', *gīslaz 'hostage', *īsarną 'iron', *lēkijaz 'healer', *laudą 'lead', *Rīnaz 'Rhine', and *tūnaz, tūną 'fortified enclosure'. (Note: The etymologies are to be found mainly in Green (2000), pp. 149–164. One is in Ringe (2006), p. 296.) These loans would likely have been borrowed during the Celtic Hallstatt and early La Tène cultures when the Celts dominated central Europe, although the period spanned several centuries.

From East Iranian came *hanapiz 'hemp' (compare Khotanese kaṃhā, Ossetian gæn(æ) 'flax'), *humalaz, humalǭ 'hops' (compare Ossetian xumællæg), *keppǭ ~ skēpą 'sheep' (compare Persian čapiš 'yearling kid'), *kurtilaz 'tunic' (cf. Osset kʷəræt 'shirt'), *kutą 'cottage' (compare Persian kad 'house'), *paidō 'cloak', *paþaz 'path' (compare Avestan pantā, gen. pathō), and *wurstwą 'work' (compare Avestan vərəštuua). (Note: The preceding etymologies come from Orel (2003), which is arranged in alphabetic order by root.) The words could have been transmitted directly by the Scythians from the Ukraine plain, groups of whom entered Central Europe via the Danube and created the Vekerzug Culture in the Carpathian Basin (sixth to fifth centuries BC), or by later contact with Sarmatians, who followed the same route. Unsure is *marhaz 'horse', which was either borrowed directly from Scytho-Sarmatian or through Celtic mediation.

==== Loans into non-Germanic languages ====
Numerous loanwords believed to have been borrowed from Proto-Germanic are known in the non-Germanic languages spoken in areas adjacent to the Germanic languages.

The heaviest influence has been on the Finnic languages, which have received hundreds of Proto-Germanic or pre-Proto-Germanic loanwords. Well-known examples include PGmc *druhtinaz 'warlord' (compare Finnish ruhtinas), *hrengaz (later *hringaz) 'ring' (compare Finnish rengas, Estonian rõngas), *kuningaz 'king' (Finnish kuningas), *lambaz 'lamb' (Finnish lammas), *lunaz 'ransom' (Finnish lunnas).

Loanwords into the Samic languages, Baltic languages and Slavic languages are also known.

=== Non-Indo-European substrate elements ===
The term substrate with reference to Proto-Germanic refers to lexical items and phonological elements that do not appear to be descended from Proto-Indo-European. The substrate theory postulates that the elements came from an earlier population that stayed amongst the Indo-Europeans and was influential enough to bring over some elements of its own language. The theory of a non-Indo-European substrate was first proposed by Sigmund Feist, who estimated that about a third of all Proto-Germanic lexical items came from the substrate. (Note: Feist was proposing the idea as early as 1913, but his classical paper on the subject is Feist, Sigmund (1932). "The Origin of the Germanic Languages and the Europeanization of North Europe". Language. 8: 245–254. doi:10.2307/408831. JSTOR 408831. A brief biography and presentation of his ideas can be found in Mees, Bernard (2003), "Stratum and Shadow: The Indo-European West: Sigmund Feist", in Andersen, Henning (ed.), Language Contacts in Prehistory: Studies in Stratigraphy, John Benjamin Publishing Company, pp. 19–21, ISBN 1-58811-379-5)

Theo Vennemann has hypothesized a Basque substrate and a Semitic superstrate in Germanic; however, his speculations, too, are generally rejected by specialists in the relevant fields.

== Phonology ==
=== Transcription ===
The following conventions are used in this article for transcribing Proto-Germanic reconstructed forms:

- Voiced obstruents appear as b, d, g; this does not imply any particular analysis of the underlying phonemes as plosives /b/, /d/, /ɡ/ or fricatives /β/, /ð/, /ɣ/. In other literature, (Note: For example in Orel 2003, p. XII.) they may be written as ƀ, đ, and ʒ respectively.
- Unvoiced fricatives appear as f, þ, h (perhaps /ɸ/, /θ/, /x/). /x/ may have become /h/ in certain positions at a later stage of Proto-Germanic itself. Similarly for /xʷ/, which later became /hʷ/ or /ʍ/ in some environments.
- Labiovelars appear as kw, hw, gw; this does not imply any particular analysis as single sounds (e.g. /kʷ/, /xʷ/, /ɡʷ/) or clusters (e.g. /kw/, /xw/, /ɡw/).
- The yod sound appears as j /j/. Note that the normal convention for representing this sound in Proto-Indo-European is y; the use of j does not imply any actual change in the pronunciation of the sound.
- Long vowels are denoted with a macron over the letter, e.g. ō. When a distinction is necessary, /ɛː/ and /eː/ are transcribed as ē¹ and ē² respectively. ē¹ is sometimes transcribed as æ or ǣ instead, but this is not followed here.
- Overlong vowels appear with circumflexes, e.g. ô. In other literature they are often denoted by a doubled macron, e.g. ō̄.
- Nasal vowels are written here with an ogonek, following Ringe's usage, e.g. ǫ̂ /õːː/. Most commonly in literature, they are denoted simply by a following n. However, this can cause confusion between a word-final nasal vowel and a word-final regular vowel followed by /n/, a distinction which was phonemic. Tildes (ã, ĩ, ũ...) are also used in some sources.
- Diphthongs appear as ai, au, eu, iu, ōi, ōu and perhaps ēi, ēu. However, when immediately followed by the corresponding semivowel, they appear as ajj, aww, eww, iww. u is written as w when between a vowel and j. This convention is based on the usage in Ringe 2006.
- Long vowels followed by a non-high vowel were separate syllables and are written as such here, except for ī, which is written ij in that case.

=== Consonants ===
The table below lists the consonantal phonemes of Proto-Germanic, ordered and classified by their reconstructed pronunciation. The slashes around the phonemes are omitted for clarity. Phones written in parentheses represent allophones and are not themselves independent phonemes. For descriptions of the sounds and definitions of the terms, follow the links on the column and row headings. (Note: While the details of the reconstructed pronunciation vary somewhat, this phonological system is generally agreed upon; for example, coronals are sometimes listed as dentals and alveolars while velars and labiovelars are sometimes combined under dorsals.)

		Labial	Coronal		Dorsal	
		Labial	plain	sib.	plain	labzd.
Nasal		m	n		(ŋ)	(ŋʷ)
Stop	voiceless	p	t		k	kʷ
Stop	voiced	b	d		(ɡ)	ɡʷ
Fricative	voiceless	ɸ	θ	s	x	xʷ
Fricative	voiced	(β)	(ð)	z	ɣ	
Sonorant	median		r		j	w
Sonorant	lateral		l			

Notes:

1. [ŋ] was an allophone of /n/ before velar obstruents.
2. [ŋʷ] was an allophone of /n/ before labiovelar obstruents.
3. /gʷ/ only appeared after [ŋʷ].
4. [β], [ð] and [ɡ] were allophones of /b/, /d/ and /ɣ/ in certain positions (see below).
5. The phoneme written as f was probably still realised as a bilabial fricative (/ɸ/) in Proto-Germanic. Evidence for this is the fact that in Gothic, word-final b (which medially represents a voiced fricative) devoices to f and also Old Norse spellings such as aptr [ɑɸtr], where the letter p rather than the more usual f was used to denote the bilabial realisation before /t/.

==== Grimm's and Verner's law ====
Grimm's law as applied to pre-proto-Germanic is a chain shift of the original Indo-European plosives. Verner's Law explains a category of exceptions to Grimm's Law, where a voiced fricative appears where Grimm's Law predicts a voiceless fricative. The discrepancy is conditioned by the placement of the original Indo-European word accent.

	Labiovelar reduction (near u)	Grimm's law: Voiceless to fricative	Grimm's law: Voiced to voiceless	Grimm's law: Aspirated to voiced	Verner's law	Labiovelar dissolution
labials		p > ɸ	b > p	bʱ > b, β	ɸ > b, β	
dentals		t > θ	d > t	dʱ > d, ð	θ > d, ð	
velars		k > x	ɡ > k	ɡʱ > ɡ, ɣ	x > ɡ, ɣ	
labiovelars	kʷ > k ɡʷ > ɡ ɡʷʱ > ɡʱ	kʷ > xʷ	ɡʷ > kʷ	ɡʷʱ > ɡʷ, ɣʷ	xʷ > ɡʷ, ɣʷ	ɣʷ > w, ɣ

p, t, and k did not undergo Grimm's law after a fricative (such as s) or after other plosives (which were shifted to fricatives by the Germanic spirant law); for example, where Latin (with the original t) has stella 'star' and octō 'eight', Middle Dutch has ster and acht (with unshifted t). This original t merged with the shifted t from the voiced consonant; that is, most of the instances of /t/ came from either the original /t/ or the shifted /t/.

(A similar shift on the consonant inventory of Proto-Germanic later generated High German. McMahon says:

Grimm's and Verner's Laws ... together form the First Germanic Consonant Shift. A second, and chronologically later Second Germanic Consonant Shift ... affected only Proto-Germanic voiceless stops ... and split Germanic into two sets of dialects, Low German in the north ... and High German further south)

Verner's law is usually reconstructed as following Grimm's law in time, and states that unvoiced fricatives: /s/, /ɸ/, /θ/, /x/ are voiced when preceded by an unaccented syllable. The accent at the time of the change was the one inherited from Proto-Indo-European, which was free and could occur on any syllable. For example, PIE *bʰréh₂tēr > PGmc. *brōþēr 'brother' but PIE *meh₂tḗr > PGmc. *mōdēr 'mother'. The voicing of some /s/ according to Verner's Law produced /z/, a new phoneme. Sometime after Grimm's and Verner's law, Proto-Germanic lost its inherited contrastive accent, and all words became stressed on their root syllable. This was generally the first syllable unless a prefix was attached.

The loss of the Proto-Indo-European contrastive accent got rid of the conditioning environment for the consonant alternations created by Verner's law. Without this conditioning environment, the cause of the alternation was no longer obvious to native speakers. The alternations that had started as mere phonetic variants of sounds became increasingly grammatical in nature, leading to the grammatical alternations of sounds known as grammatischer Wechsel. For a single word, the grammatical stem could display different consonants depending on its grammatical case or its tense. As a result of the complexity of this system, significant levelling of these sounds occurred throughout the Germanic period as well as in the later daughter languages. Already in Proto-Germanic, most alternations in nouns were leveled to have only one sound or the other consistently throughout all forms of a word, although some alternations were preserved, only to be levelled later in the daughters (but differently in each one). Alternations in noun and verb endings were also levelled, usually in favour of the voiced alternants in nouns, but a split remained in verbs where unsuffixed (strong) verbs received the voiced alternants while suffixed (weak) verbs had the voiceless alternants. Alternation between the present and past of strong verbs remained common and was not levelled in Proto-Germanic, and survives up to the present day in some Germanic languages.

==== Allophones ====
Some of the consonants that developed from the sound shifts are thought to have been pronounced in different ways (allophones) depending on the sounds around them. With regard to original /k/ or /kʷ/ Trask says:

The resulting /x/ or /xʷ/ were reduced to /h/ and /hʷ/ in word-initial position.

Many of the consonants listed in the table could appear lengthened or prolonged under some circumstances, which is inferred from their appearing in some daughter languages as doubled letters. This phenomenon is termed gemination. Kraehenmann says:

Then, Proto-Germanic already had long consonants ... but they contrasted with short ones only word-medially. Moreover, they were not very frequent and occurred only intervocally almost exclusively after short vowels.

The voiced phonemes /b/, /d/, /ɡ/ and /ɡʷ/ are reconstructed with the pronunciation of stops in some environments and fricatives in others. The pattern of allophony is not completely clear, but generally is similar to the patterns of voiced obstruent allophones in languages such as Spanish. The voiced fricatives of Verner's law, which only occurred in non-word-initial positions, merged with the fricative allophones of /b/, /d/, /ɡ/ and /ɡʷ/.

Each of the three voiced phonemes /b/, /d/, and /ɡ/ had a slightly different pattern of allophony from the others, but in general stops occurred in "strong" positions (word-initial and in clusters) while fricatives occurred in "weak" positions (post-vocalic). More specifically:

- Word-initial /b/ and /d/ were stops [b] and [d].
- A good deal of evidence, however, indicates that word-initial /ɡ/ was [ɣ], subsequently developing to [ɡ] in a number of languages. This is clearest from developments in Anglo-Frisian and other Ingvaeonic languages. Southern varieties of Modern Dutch (e.g. speakers from Limburg, Brabant, Southern Gelderland, as well as most Flemish speech varieties) still preserve the sound of [ɣ] in this position. (However, in most other Western and Northern Dutch varieties like the mainstream Randstad dialect, the historically distinct phonemes ⟨g⟩ [ɣ] and ⟨ch⟩ [x] have merged into the hard g (Dutch: harde g), i.e. a voiceless uvular fricative [χ].)
- Plosives appeared after homorganic nasal consonants: [mb], [nd], [ŋɡ], [ŋʷɡʷ]. This was the only place where a voiced labiovelar [ɡʷ] could still occur.
- When geminate, they were pronounced as stops [bb], [dd], [ɡɡ]. This rule continued to apply at least into the early West Germanic languages, since the West Germanic gemination produced geminated plosives from earlier voiced fricatives.
- /d/ was [d] after /l/ or /z/. Evidence for /d/ after /r/ is conflicting: it appears as a plosive in Gothic waurd 'word' (not *waurþ, with devoicing), but as a fricative in Old Norse orð. /d/ hardened to [d] in all positions in the West Germanic languages.
- In other positions, fricatives occurred singly after vowels and diphthongs, and after non-nasal consonants in the case of /b/ and /ɡ/.

==== Labiovelars ====
Labiovelars were affected by the following additional changes:

1. The PIE boukólos rule continues to operate as a surface filter in Proto-Germanic; in newly generated environments where a labiovelar occurred next to /u/, it was immediately converted to a plain velar. This caused alternations in certain verb paradigms, e.g. *singwaną [siŋʷɡʷɑnɑ̃] 'to sing' versus *sungun [suŋɡun] 'they sang'. Apparently, this delabialization also occurred with labiovelars following /un/, showing that the language possessed a labial allophone [ŋʷ] as well. In this case the entire clusters [uŋʷxʷ], [uŋʷkʷ] and [uŋʷɡʷ] are delabialized to [uŋx], [uŋk] and [uŋɡ].
2. (Early) Proto-Germanic /ɡʷ/ knew at least three different outcomes: after /n/, it was preserved (e.g. *sangwaz 'song'); next to /u/ and before /r/ in initial positions it was delabialized to /g/ (e.g. *gudą 'god', *grindaną 'to grind'); in all other positions /ɡʷ/ usually became /w/ (e.g. *warmaz 'warm', *snaiwaz 'snow', *neurô 'kidney'). Evidence for a sound change /ɡʷ/ > /b/ in initial positions is slim.

These various changes often led to complex alternations, e.g. *sehwaną [ˈsexʷɑnɑ̃] 'to see', *sēgun [ˈsɛːɣun] 'they saw' (indicative), *sēwīn [ˈsɛːwiːn] 'they saw' (subjunctive), which were reanalysed and regularised differently in the various daughter languages.

==== Consonant gradation ====
Kroonen posits a process of consonant mutation for Proto-Germanic, under the name consonant gradation. (This is distinct from the consonant mutation processes occurring in the neighboring Samic and Finnic languages, also known as consonant gradation since the 19th century.) The Proto-Germanic consonant gradation is not directly attested in any of the Germanic dialects, but may nevertheless be reconstructed on the basis of certain dialectal discrepancies in root of the n-stems and the ōn-verbs.

Diachronically, the rise of consonant gradation in Germanic can be explained by Kluge's law, by which geminates arose from stops followed by a nasal in a stressed syllable. Since this sound law only operated in part of the paradigms of the n-stems and ōn-verbs, it gave rise to an alternation of geminated and non-geminated consonants in the same paradigms. These were largely regularized by various ways of analogy in the Germanic daughter languages.

Since its formulation, the validity of Kluge's Law has been contested. The development of geminate consonants has also been explained by the idea of "expressive gemination". Although this idea remains popular, it does not explain why many words containing geminated stops do not have "expressive" or "intensive" semantics. The idea has been described as "methodically unsound", because it attempts to explain the phonological phenomenon through psycholinguistic factors and other irregular behaviour instead of exploring regular sound laws.

The origin of the Germanic geminate consonants remains a disputed part of historical linguistics with no clear consensus at present.

n-stems	PIE	PGM
nominative	C_́C*-ōn	C_C-ō
genitive	C_C*-n-ós	C_CC-az

neh₂-presents	PIE	PGM
3p. singular	C_C*-néh₂-ti	C_CC-ōþi
3p. plural	C_C*-nh₂-énti	C_G-unanþi

The reconstruction of grading paradigms in Proto-Germanic explains root alternations such as Old English steorra 'star' < *sterran- vs. Old Frisian stera 'id.' < **steran- and Norwegian (dial.) guva 'to swing' < *gubōn- vs. Middle High German gupfen 'id.' < *guppōn- as generalizations of the original allomorphy. In the cases concerned, this would imply reconstructing an n-stem nom. *sterō, gen. *sterraz < PIE *h₂stér-ōn, *h₂ster-n-ós and an ōn-verb 3sg. *guppōþi, 3pl. *gubunanþi < *gʱubʱ-néh₂-ti, *gʱubʱ-nh₂-énti.

=== Vowels ===
Proto-Germanic had four short vowels, five or six long vowels, and at least one "overlong" or "trimoraic" vowel. The exact phonetic quality of the vowels is uncertain.

Oral vowels
Type	Front			Back		
Type	short	long	overl.	short	long	overl.
Close	i	iː		u	uː	
Mid	e	eː~ɛː	ɛːː		ɔː	ɔːː
Open				ɑ	ɑː	

Nasal vowels
Type	Front		Back		
Type	short	long	short	long	overl.
Close	ĩ	ĩː	ũ	ũː	
Open-mid				ɔ̃ː	ɔ̃ːː
Open			ɑ̃	ɑ̃ː	

Notes:

1. /e/ could not occur in unstressed syllables except before /r/, where it may have been lowered to /ɑ/ already in late Proto-Germanic times.
2. All nasal vowels except /ɑ̃ː/, /ĩː/, and /ũː/ only occurred word-finally, and of these, only /ĩː/ also occurred word-finally. Word-internal nasal vowels only occurred before /x/, and derived from their earlier respective short vowels (/ɑ/, /i/, and /u/) followed by /nx/.

PIE ə (laryngeals), a, o merged into PGmc a; PIE ā, ō merged into PGmc ō. It is known that the raising of ā to ō can not have occurred earlier than the earliest contact between Proto-Germanic speakers and the Romans. This can be verified by the fact that Latin Rōmānī later emerges in Gothic as Rumoneis (that is, Rūmōnīs). It is explained by Ringe that at the time of borrowing, the vowel matching closest in sound to Latin ā was a Proto-Germanic ā-like vowel (which later became ō). And since Proto-Germanic therefore lacked a mid(-high) back vowel, the closest equivalent of Latin ō was Proto-Germanic ū: Rōmānī > *Rūmānīz > *Rūmōnīz > Gothic Rumoneis.

A new ā was formed following the shift from ā to ō when intervocalic /j/ was lost in -aja- sequences. It was a rare phoneme, and occurred only in a handful of words, the most notable being the verbs of the third weak class. The agent noun suffix *-ārijaz (Modern English -er in words such as baker or teacher) was likely borrowed from Latin around or shortly after this time.

==== Diphthongs ====
The following diphthongs are known to have existed in Proto-Germanic:

- Short: /ɑu/, /ɑi/, /eu/, /iu/ (from i-umlaut of /eu/) before /i/ or /j/
- Long: /ɔːu/, /ɔːi/, (possibly /ɛːu/, /ɛːi/)

Note the change /e/ > /i/ before /i/ or /j/ in the same or following syllable. This removed /ei/ (which became /iː/) but created /iu/ from earlier /eu/.

Diphthongs in Proto-Germanic can also be analysed as sequences of a vowel plus an approximant, as was the case in Proto-Indo-European. This explains why /j/ was not lost in *niwjaz ('new'); the second element of the diphthong iu was still underlyingly a consonant and therefore the conditioning environment for the loss was not met. This is also confirmed by the fact that later in the West Germanic gemination, -wj- is geminated to -wwj- in parallel with the other consonants (except /r/).

==== Overlong vowels ====
Proto-Germanic had two overlong or trimoraic long vowels ô [ɔːː] and ê [ɛːː], the latter mainly in adverbs (cf. *hwadrê 'whereto, whither'). None of the documented languages still include such vowels. Their reconstruction is due to the comparative method, particularly as a way of explaining an otherwise unpredictable two-way split of reconstructed long ō in final syllables, which unexpectedly remained long in some morphemes but shows normal shortening in others.

Proto-Germanic	Gothic	Old Norse	Old English	Old High German
-ō	-a	-u > Ø	-u / Ø	
-ô	-ō / -a	-a		-o

Trimoraic vowels generally occurred at morpheme boundaries where a bimoraic long vowel and a short vowel in hiatus contracted, especially after the loss of an intervening laryngeal (-VHV-). One example, without a laryngeal, includes the class II weak verbs (ō-stems) where a -j- was lost between vowels, so that -ōja → ōa → ô (cf. *salbōjaną → *salbôną → Gothic salbōn 'to anoint'). However, the majority occurred in word-final syllables (inflectional endings) probably because in this position the vowel could not be resyllabified. Additionally, Germanic, like Balto-Slavic, lengthened bimoraic long vowels in absolute final position, perhaps to better conform to a word's prosodic template; e.g., PGmc *arô 'eagle' ← PIE **h₃ér-ō just as Lith akmuõ 'stone', OSl kamy ← *aḱmō̃ ← PIE **h₂éḱ-mō. Contrast:

- contraction after loss of laryngeal: gen.pl. *wulfǫ̂ 'wolves' ← *wulfôn ← pre-Gmc *wúlpōom ← PIE **wĺ̥kʷoHom; ō-stem gen.pl. **-ôz ← pre-Gmc **-āas ← PIE **-eh₂es.
- contraction of short vowels: a-stem nom.pl. *wulfôz 'wolves' ← PIE **wĺ̥kʷoes.

But vowels that were lengthened by laryngeals did not become overlong. Compare:

- ō-stem nom.sg. *-ō ← *-ā ← PIE **-eh₂;
- ō-stem acc.sg. *-ǭ ← *-ān ← *-ām (by Stang's law) ← PIE **-eh₂m;
- ō-stem acc.pl. *-ōz ← *-āz ← *-ās (by Stang's law) ← PIE **-eh₂ns;

Trimoraic vowels are distinguished from bimoraic vowels by their outcomes in attested Germanic languages: word-final trimoraic vowels remained long vowels while bimoraic vowels developed into short vowels. Older theories about the phenomenon claimed that long and overlong vowels were both long but differed in tone, i.e., ô and ê had a "circumflex" (rise-fall-rise) tone while ō and ē had an "acute" (rising) tone, much like the tones of modern Scandinavian languages, Baltic, and Ancient Greek, and asserted that this distinction was inherited from PIE. However, this view was abandoned since languages in general do not combine distinctive intonations on unstressed syllables with contrastive stress and vowel length. Modern theories have reinterpreted overlong vowels as having superheavy syllable weight (three moras) and therefore greater length than ordinary long vowels.

By the end of the Proto-Germanic period, word-final long vowels were shortened to short vowels. Following that, overlong vowels were shortened to regular long vowels in all positions, merging with originally long vowels except word-finally (because of the earlier shortening), so that they remained distinct in that position. This was a late dialectal development, because the result was not the same in all Germanic languages: word-final ē shortened to a in East and West Germanic but to i in Old Norse, and word-final ō shortened to a in Gothic but to o (probably [o]) in early North and West Germanic, with a later raising to u (the sixth century Salic law still has maltho in late Frankish).

The shortened overlong vowels in final position developed as regular long vowels from that point on, including the lowering of ē to ā in North and West Germanic. The monophthongization of unstressed au in Northwest Germanic produced a phoneme which merged with this new word-final long ō, while the monophthongization of unstressed ai produced a new ē which did not merge with original ē, but rather with ē₂, as it was not lowered to ā. This split, combined with the asymmetric development in West Germanic, with ē lowering but ō raising, points to an early difference in the articulation height of the two vowels that was not present in North Germanic. It could be seen as evidence that the lowering of ē to ā began in West Germanic at a time when final vowels were still long, and spread to North Germanic through the late Germanic dialect continuum, but only reaching the latter after the vowels had already been shortened.

==== ē₁ and ē₂ ====
ē₂ is uncertain as a phoneme and only reconstructed from a small number of words; it is posited by the comparative method because whereas all provable instances of inherited (PIE) *ē (PGmc. *ē₁) are distributed in Gothic as ē and the other Germanic languages as *ā, all the Germanic languages agree on some occasions of ē (e.g., Goth/OE/ON hēr 'here' ← late PGmc. *hē₂r). Gothic makes no orthographic and therefore presumably no phonetic distinction between ē₁ and ē₂, but the existence of two Proto-Germanic long e-like phonemes is supported by the existence of two e-like Elder Futhark runes, Ehwaz and Eihwaz.

Krahe treats ē₂ (secondary ē) as identical with ī. It probably continues PIE ēi, and it may have been in the process of transition from a diphthong to a long simple vowel in the Proto-Germanic period. Lehmann lists the following origins for ē₂:

- ēi: Old High German fiara, fera 'ham', Goth fera 'side, flank' ← PGmc *fē₂rō ← *pēi-s-eh₂ ← PIE **(s)peh₁i-.
- ea: The preterite of class 7 strong verbs with ai, al or an plus a consonant, or ē₁; e.g. OHG erien 'to plow' ← *arjanan vs. preterite iar, ier ← *e-ar-
- iz, after loss of -z: OEng mēd, OHG miata 'reward' (vs. OEng meord, Goth mizdō) ← PGmc *mē₂dō ← *mizdō ← PIE **misdʰ-eh₂.
- Certain pronominal forms, e.g. OEng hēr, OHG hiar 'here' ← PGmc *hiar, derivative of *hi- 'this' ← PIE **ḱi- 'this'
- Words borrowed from Latin ē or e in the root syllable after a certain period (older loans also show ī).

==== Nasal vowels ====
Proto-Germanic developed nasal vowels from two sources. The earlier and much more frequent source was word-final -n (from PIE -n or -m) in unstressed syllables, which at first gave rise to short -ą, -į, -ų, long -į̄, -ę̄, -ą̄, and overlong -ę̂, -ą̂. -ę̄ and -ę̂ then merged into -ą̄ and -ą̂, which later developed into -ǭ and -ǫ̂. Another source, developing only in late Proto-Germanic times, was in the sequences -inh-, -anh-, -unh-, in which the nasal consonant lost its occlusion and was converted into lengthening and nasalisation of the preceding vowel, becoming -ą̄h-, -į̄h-, -ų̄h- (still written as -anh-, -inh-, -unh- in this article).

In many cases, the nasality was not contrastive and was merely present as an additional surface articulation. No Germanic language that preserves the word-final vowels has their nasality preserved. Word-final short nasal vowels do not show different reflexes compared to non-nasal vowels. However, the comparative method does require a three-way phonemic distinction between word-final *-ō, *-ǭ and *-ōn, which each has a distinct pattern of reflexes in the later Germanic languages:

Proto-Germanic	Gothic	Old Norse	Old High German	Old English
-ō	-a	-u > —	-u / —	
-ǭ	-a			-e
-ōn	-ōn	-a, -u	-ōn	-an

The distinct reflexes of nasal -ǭ versus non-nasal -ō are caused by the Northwest Germanic raising of final -ō /ɔː/ to /oː/, which did not affect -ǭ. When the vowels were shortened and denasalised, these two vowels no longer had the same place of articulation, and did not merge: -ō became /o/ (later /u/) while -ǭ became /ɔ/ (later /ɑ/). This allowed their reflexes to stay distinct.

The nasality of word-internal vowels (from -nh-) was more stable, and survived into the early dialects intact.

Phonemic nasal vowels definitely occurred in Proto-Norse and Old Norse. They were preserved in Old Icelandic down to at least a.d. 1125, the earliest possible time for the creation of the First Grammatical Treatise, which documents nasal vowels. The PG nasal vowels from -nh- sequences were preserved in Old Icelandic as shown by examples given in the First Grammatical Treatise. For example:

- há̇r 'shark' < *hą̄haz < PG *hanhaz
- ǿ̇ra 'younger' < *jų̄hizô < PG *junhizô (cf. Gothic jūhiza)

The phonemicity is evident from minimal pairs like ǿ̇ra 'younger' vs. ǿra 'vex' < *wor-, cognate with English weary. The inherited Proto-Germanic nasal vowels were joined in Old Norse by nasal vowels from other sources, e.g. loss of *n before s. Modern Elfdalian still includes nasal vowels that directly derive from Old Norse, e.g. gą̊s 'goose' < Old Norse gás (presumably nasalized, although not so written); compare German Gans, showing the original consonant.

Similar surface (possibly phonemic) nasal/non-nasal contrasts occurred in the West Germanic languages down through Proto-Anglo-Frisian of AD 400 or so. Proto-Germanic medial nasal vowels were inherited, but were joined by new nasal vowels resulting from the Ingvaeonic nasal spirant law, which extended the loss of nasal consonants (only before -h- in Proto-Germanic) to all environments before a fricative (thus including -mf-, -nþ- and -ns- as well). The contrast between nasal and non-nasal long vowels is reflected in the differing output of nasalized long *ą̄, which was raised to ō in Old English and Old Frisian whereas non-nasal *ā appeared as fronted ǣ. Hence:

- English goose, West Frisian goes, North Frisian goos < Old English/Frisian gōs < Anglo-Frisian *gą̄s < Proto-Germanic *gans
- En tooth < Old English tōþ, Old Frisian tōth < Anglo-Frisian *tą̄þ < Proto-Germanic *tanþs
- En brought, WFris brocht < Old English brōhte, Old Frisian brōchte < Anglo-Frisian *brą̄htæ < Proto-Germanic *branhtaz (the past participle of *bringaną).

=== Phonotactics ===
The following examples show all the consonant sequences occurring word-initially before a vowel in reconstructible Proto-Germanic words. Labiovelars are regarded as velar + w sequences here, rather than single consonants. Clusters described as 'questionable' are lacking in securely reconstructible examples.

- Any single consonant except z: *pīkaz, *tungǭ, *katilaz, *badwō, *dagaz, *gans, *fadēr, *þeudō, *hunhruz, *samdaz, *mizdō, *niwjaz, *rīks, *laguz, *jungaz, *wullō.
- Consonant + w: *twai, *kweþaną, *dwalaz, *þwahaną, *hwītaz, *swartaz.
- Consonant + r: *prattugaz, *triwwiz, *kreustaną, *bringaną, *drinkaną, *grasą, *frijaz, *þridjô, *hrainiz, *wrēkō.
- Consonant + l: *plōgaz, *klinganą, *blindaz, *glawwaz, *flōduz, *hlaibaz, *slēpaną, *wlitiz.
- Consonant + nasal: *knewą, *hnīwaną, *smalaz, *snaiwaz; questionably *gnaganą, *fneusaną.
- s + plosive: *spinnaną, *stainaz, *skipą.
- s + plosive + liquid: *springaną, *splītaną, *strikiz, *skrībaną.

The following examples show some (not necessarily all) of the consonant sequences that could occur morpheme-internally in a non-word-initial position.

- Any single consonant: *slēpaną, *katilaz, *pīkaz, *hlaibaz, *fadēr, *dagaz, *nefô, *kweþaną, *þwahaną, *grasą, *azaniz, *sumaraz, *hrainiz, *jērą, *dwalaz, *frijaz, *hnīwaną.
- Geminates: *wissaz, *immi, *spinnaną, *ferrai, *wullō, *ajją, *triwwiz; questionably *ruppōną, *skattaz, *smakkuz.
- Any consonant + j: *skapjaną, *sattjaną, *rakjaną, *habjaną, *þridjô, *lagjaną, *sufjaną, *raþjǭ, *hlahjaną, *hrisjaną, *hazjaną, *tamjaną, *þanjaną, *warjaną, *saljaną, *niwjaz.
- Obstruent + w: *gatwǭ, *nakwadaz, *fedwōr, *saliþwō, *sehwaną, *ubiswō; questionably *izwiz.
- r + any consonant except l: *werpaną, *swartaz, *wurkijaną, *þarbō, *wurdą, *burgz, *þarf, *werþą, *þwerhaz, *wirsiz, *armaz, *hurną, *sparwô; questionably *þurznaną.
- l + any consonant except n or r: *helpaną, *saltą, *skalkaz, *selbaz, *skuldaz, *balgiz, *wulfaz, *gulþą, *felhaną, *halsaz, *helmaz, *swalwǭ; questionably *kalzōną.
- Nasal + obstruent: *limpaną, *wintruz, *drinkaną, *lambaz, *blindaz, *tungǭ, *fimf, *munþaz, *fanhaną (pronounced [ˈfɑ̃ːxɑnɑ̃]), *amsaz, *mimzą, *gans; questionably *samdaz.
- Nasal + obstruent + w: *sinkwaną, *singwaną.
- Two obstruents: *aspō, *fastuz, *fiskaz, *aftanē, *wafsō, *ahtōu, *sehs, *mizdō; questionably *mazgą.

=== Later developments ===
Due to the emergence of a word-initial stress accent, vowels in unstressed syllables were gradually reduced over time, beginning at the very end of the Proto-Germanic period and continuing into the history of the various dialects. Already in Proto-Germanic, word-final /e/ and /ɑ/ had been lost, and /e/ had merged with /i/ in unstressed syllables. Vowels in third syllables were also generally lost before dialect diversification began, such as final -i of some present tense verb endings, and in -maz and -miz of the dative plural ending and first person plural present of verbs.

Word-final short nasal vowels were however preserved longer, as is reflected in Proto-Norse which still preserved word-final -ą (horna on the Gallehus horns), while the dative plural appears as -mz (gestumz on the Stentoften Runestone). Somewhat greater reduction is found in Gothic, which lost all final-syllable short vowels except u. Old High German and Old English initially preserved unstressed i and u, but later lost them in long-stemmed words and then Old High German lost them in many short-stemmed ones as well, by analogy.

Old English shows indirect evidence that word-final -ą was preserved into the separate history of the language. This can be seen in the infinitive ending -an (< *aną) and the strong past participle ending -en (< *-anaz). Since the early Old English fronting of /ɑ/ to /æ/ did not occur in nasalized vowels or before back vowels, this created a vowel alternation because the nasality of the back vowel ą in the infinitive ending prevented the fronting of the preceding vowel: *-aną > *-an, but *-anaz > *-ænæ > *-en. Therefore, the Anglo-Frisian brightening must necessarily have occurred very early in the history of the Anglo-Frisian languages, before the loss of final -ą.

The outcome of final vowels and combinations in the various daughters is shown in the table below:

Ending(s)	PG	Gothic	NorthGm		WestGm		
Ending(s)	PG	Gothic	PNGm	ON	PWGm	OHG	OE
a-stem masculine accusative singular	*ą	—	*a	—	*a?	—	—
i-stem masculine accusative singular	*į	—	*i?	—	*a?	—	—
u-stem accusative singular	*ų	u	*u?	—	*a?	—	—
a-stem masculine nominative singular	*az	s	*az	r	*a?	—	—
i-stem nominative singular	*iz	s	*iz	r	*i	i/—	e/—
u-stem nominative singular	*uz	us	*uz	r	*u	u/—	
1st person singular present of verbs	*ō	a	*o > u	—	*o > u	u/—	
ō-stem adjective accusative singular	*ǭ	a	*ō	a	*ā	a	e
ō-stem accusative plural	*ōz	ōs	*ōz	ar	*ā	a	e
3rd person singular past of weak verbs	*ē	a	*e > i	i	*a	a	e
a-stem dative singular	*ai	a	*ē	i	*ē	e	e
short ja-stem neuter nominative singular	*ją	i	*ja	—	*i > ī	i	e
short ja-stem masculine nominative singular	*jaz	is > jis	*jaz	r	*i > ī	i	e
i-stem nominative plural	*īz	eis (=īs)	*īz	ir	*ī	i	e
long ja-stem masculine nominative singular	*ijaz	eis (=īs)	*ijaz	ir	*ī	i	e
long ja-stem neuter nominative singular	*iją	i	*ija	i	*ī	i	e
3rd person singular past subjunctive	*ī	i	*ī	i	*ī	i	e
adverb suffix	*ô	ō	*ō	a	*ō	o	a
genitive plural	ǫ̂	ō	*ō	a	*ō	o	a
ō-stem nominative plural	*ôz	ōs	*ōz	ar	*ō	o	a
u-stem genitive singular	auz	aus (=ɔ̄s)	*ōz	ar	*ō	o	a
adverb suffix	*ê	ē	*ā	a	*ā	a	e

Some Proto-Germanic endings have merged in all of the literary languages but are still distinct in runic Proto-Norse, e.g. *-īz vs. -ijaz (þrijōz dohtrīz 'three daughters' in the Tune stone vs. the name Holtijaz in the Gallehus horns).

== Morphology ==
Reconstructions are tentative and multiple versions with varying degrees of difference exist. All reconstructed forms are marked with an asterisk (*).

It is often asserted that the Germanic languages have a highly reduced system of inflections as compared with Greek, Latin, or Sanskrit. Although this is true to some extent, it is probably due more to the late time of attestation of Germanic than to any inherent "simplicity" of the Germanic languages. As an example, there are less than 500 years between the Gothic Gospels of 360 and the Old High German Tatian of 830, yet Old High German, despite being the most archaic of the West Germanic languages, is missing a large number of archaic features present in Gothic, including dual and passive markings on verbs, reduplication in Class VII strong verb past tenses, the vocative case, and second-position (Wackernagel's Law) clitics. Many more archaic features may have been lost between the Proto-Germanic of 200 BC or so and the attested Gothic language. Furthermore, Proto-Romance and Middle Indic of the fourth century AD—contemporaneous with Gothic—were significantly simpler than Latin and Sanskrit, respectively, and overall probably no more archaic than Gothic. In addition, some parts of the inflectional systems of Greek, Latin, and Sanskrit were innovations that were not present in Proto-Indo-European.

=== General morphological features ===
Proto-Germanic had six cases, three genders, three numbers, three moods (indicative, subjunctive (PIE optative), imperative), and two voices (active and passive (PIE middle)). This is quite similar to the state of Latin, Greek, and Middle Indic of c. AD 200.

Nouns and adjectives were declined in (at least) six cases: vocative, nominative, accusative, dative, instrumental, genitive. The locative case had merged into the dative case, and the ablative may have merged with either the genitive, dative or instrumental cases. However, sparse remnants of the earlier locative and ablative cases are visible in a few pronominal and adverbial forms. Pronouns were declined similarly, although without a separate vocative form. The instrumental and vocative can be reconstructed only in the singular; the instrumental survives only in the West Germanic languages, and the vocative only in Gothic.

Verbs and pronouns had three numbers: singular, dual, and plural. Although the pronominal dual survived into all the oldest languages, the verbal dual survived only into Gothic, and the (presumed) nominal and adjectival dual forms were lost before the oldest records. As in the Italic languages, it may have been lost before Proto-Germanic became a different branch at all.

=== Consonant and vowel alternations ===
Several sound changes occurred in the history of Proto-Germanic that were triggered only in some environments but not in others. Some of these were grammaticalised while others were still triggered by phonetic rules and were partially allophonic or surface filters.

Probably the most far-reaching alternation was between [*f, *þ, *s, *h, *hw] and [*b, *d, *z, *g, *gw], the voiceless and voiced fricatives, known as grammatischer Wechsel and triggered by the earlier operation of Verner's law. It was found in various environments:

- In the person-and-number endings of verbs, which were voiceless in weak verbs and voiced in strong verbs.
- Between different grades of strong verbs. The voiceless alternants appeared in the present and past singular indicative, the voiced alternants in the remaining past tense forms.
- Between strong verbs (voiceless) and causative verbs derived from them (voiced).
- Between verbs and derived nouns.
- Between the singular and plural forms of some nouns.

Another form of alternation was triggered by the Germanic spirant law, which continued to operate into the separate history of the individual daughter languages. It is found in environments with suffixal -t, including:

- The second-person singular past ending *-t of strong verbs.
- The past tense of weak verbs with no vowel infix in the past tense.
- Nouns derived from verbs by means of the suffixes *-tiz, *-tuz, *-taz, which also possessed variants in -þ- and -d- when not following an obstruent.

An alternation not triggered by sound change was Sievers' law, which caused alternation of suffixal -j- and -ij- depending on the length of the preceding part of the morpheme. If preceded within the same morpheme by only a short vowel followed by a single consonant, -j- appeared. In all other cases, such as when preceded by a long vowel or diphthong, by two or more consonants, or by more than one syllable, -ij- appeared. The distinction between morphemes and words is important here, as the alternant -j- appeared also in words that contained a distinct suffix that in turn contained -j- in its second syllable. A notable example was the verb suffix *-atjaną, which retained -j- despite being preceded by two syllables in a fully formed word.

Related to the above was the alternation between -j- and -i-, and likewise between -ij- and -ī-. This was caused by the earlier loss of -j- before -i-, and appeared whenever an ending was attached to a verb or noun with an -(i)j- suffix (which were numerous). Similar, but much more rare, was an alternation between -aV- and -aiC- from the loss of -j- between two vowels, which appeared in the present subjunctive of verbs: *-aų < *-ajų in the first person, *-ai- in the others. A combination of these two effects created an alternation between -ā- and -ai- found in class 3 weak verbs, with -ā- < -aja- < -əja- and -ai- < -əi- < -əji-.

I-mutation was the most important source of vowel alternation, and continued well into the history of the individual daughter languages (although it was either absent or not apparent in Gothic). In Proto-Germanic, only -e- was affected, which was raised by -i- or -j- in the following syllable. Examples are numerous:

- Verb endings beginning with -i-: present second and third person singular, third person plural.
- Noun endings beginning with -i- in u-stem nouns: dative singular, nominative and genitive plural.
- Causatives derived from strong verbs with a -j- suffix.
- Verbs derived from nouns with a -j- suffix.
- Nouns derived from verbs with a -j- suffix.
- Nouns and adjectives derived with a variety of suffixes including -il-, -iþō, -į̄, -iskaz, -ingaz.

=== Nouns ===
The system of nominal declensions was largely inherited from PIE. Primary nominal declensions were the stems in /a/, /ō/, /n/, /i/, and /u/. The first three were particularly important and served as the basis of adjectival declension; there was a tendency for nouns of all other classes to be drawn into them. The first two had variants in /ja/ and /wa/, and /jō/ and /wō/, respectively; originally, these were declined exactly like other nouns of the respective class, but later sound changes tended to distinguish these variants as their own subclasses. The /n/ nouns had various subclasses, including /ōn/ (masculine and feminine), /an/ (neuter), and /īn/ (feminine, mostly abstract nouns). There was also a smaller class of root nouns (ending in various consonants), nouns of relationship (ending in /er/), and neuter nouns in /z/ (this class was greatly expanded in German). Present participles, and a few nouns, ended in /nd/. The neuter nouns of all classes differed from the masculines and feminines in their nominative and accusative endings, which were alike.

Case	Nouns in -a-		Nouns in -i-	
Case	Singular	Plural	Singular	Plural
Nominative	*wulfaz	*wulfōz, -ōs	*gastiz	*gastīz
Vocative	*wulf	*wulfōz, -ōs	*gasti	*gastīz
Accusative	*wulfą	*wulfanz	*gastį	*gastinz
Genitive	*wulfas, -is	*wulfǫ̂	*gastīz	*gastijǫ̂
Dative	*wulfai	*wulfamaz	*gastī	*gastimaz
Instrumental	*wulfō	*wulfamiz	*gastī	*gastimiz

=== Adjectives ===
Adjectives agree with the noun they qualify in case, number, and gender. Adjectives evolved into strong and weak declensions, originally with indefinite and definite meaning, respectively. As a result of its definite meaning, the weak form came to be used in the daughter languages in conjunction with demonstratives and definite articles. The terms strong and weak are based on the later development of these declensions in languages such as German and Old English, where the strong declensions have more distinct endings. In the proto-language, as in Gothic, such terms have no relevance. The strong declension was based on a combination of the nominal /a/ and /ō/ stems with the PIE pronominal endings; the weak declension was based on the nominal /n/ declension.

Strong declension
Case	Singular			Plural		
Case	Masculine	Neuter	Feminine	Masculine	Neuter	Feminine
Nominative	*blindaz	*blinda-tō	*blindō	*blindai	*blindō	*blindôz
Accusative	*blindanǭ	*blinda-tō	*blindō	*blindanz	*blindō	*blindôz
Genitive	*blindas, -is		*blindaizōz	*blindaizǫ̂		
Dative	*blindammai		*blindaizōi	*blindaimaz		
Instrumental	*blindanō		*blindaizō	*blindaimiz		

Weak declension
Case	Singular			Plural		
Case	Masculine	Neuter	Feminine	Masculine	Neuter	Feminine
Nominative	*blindô	*blindô	*blindǭ	*blindaniz	*blindōnō	*blindōniz
Accusative	*blindanų	*blindô	*blindanų	*blindanunz	*blindōnō	*blindōnunz
Genitive	*blindiniz		*blindōniz	*blindanǫ̂		*blindōnǫ̂
Dative	*blindini		*blindōni	*blindammaz		*blindōmaz
Instrumental	*blindinē		*blindōnē	*blindammiz		*blindōmiz

=== Determiners ===
Proto-Germanic originally had two demonstratives (proximal *hi-/*hei-/*he- 'this', distal *sa/*sō/*þat 'that') which could serve as both adjectives and pronouns. The proximal was already obsolescent in Gothic (e.g. Goth acc. hina, dat. himma, neut. hita) and appears entirely absent in North Germanic. In the West Germanic languages, it evolved into a third-person pronoun, displacing the inherited *iz in the northern languages while being ousted itself in the southern languages, such as Old High German. This is the basis of the distinction between English him/her (with h- from the original proximal demonstrative) and German ihm/ihr (lacking h-).

Ultimately, only the distal survived in the function of demonstrative. In most languages, it developed a second role as definite article, and underlies both the English determiners the and that. In the North-West Germanic languages (but not in Gothic), a new proximal demonstrative ('this' as opposed to 'that') evolved by appending -si to the distal demonstrative (e.g. Runic Norse nom.sg. sa-si, gen. þes-si, dat. þeim-si), with complex subsequent developments in the various daughter languages. The new demonstrative underlies the English determiners this, these and those. (Originally, these, those were dialectal variants of the masculine plural of this.)

Inflection of the distal deictic
Case	Singular			Plural		
Case	Masculine	Neuter	Feminine	Masculine	Neuter	Feminine
Nominative	*sa	*þat	*sō	*þai	*þō	*þôz
Accusative	*þanǭ	*þat	*þǭ	*þanz	*þō	*þôz
Genitive	*þas		*þaizōz	*þaizǫ̂		
Dative	*þammai		*þaizōi	*þaimaz		
Instrumental	*þana?		*þaizō	*þaimiz		

=== Verbs ===
Proto-Germanic had only two tenses (past and present), compared to 5–7 in Greek, Latin, Proto-Slavic and Sanskrit. Some of this difference is due to deflexion, featured by a loss of tenses present in Proto-Indo-European. For example, Donald Ringe assumes for Proto-Germanic an early loss of the PIE imperfect aspect (something that also occurred in most other branches), followed by merging of the aspectual categories present-aorist and the mood categories indicative-subjunctive. (This assumption allows him to account for cases where Proto-Germanic has present indicative verb forms that look like PIE aorist subjunctives.)

However, many of the tenses of the other languages (e.g. future, future perfect, pluperfect, Latin imperfect) are not cognate with each other and represent separate innovations in each language. For example, the Greek future uses a -s- ending, apparently derived from a desiderative construction that in PIE was part of the system of derivational morphology (not the inflectional system); the Sanskrit future uses a -sy- ending, from a different desiderative verb construction and often with a different ablaut grade from Greek; while the Latin future uses endings derived either from the PIE subjunctive or from the PIE verb */bʱuː/ 'to be'. Similarly, the Latin imperfect and pluperfect stem from Italic innovations and are not cognate with the corresponding Greek or Sanskrit forms; and while the Greek and Sanskrit pluperfect tenses appear cognate, there are no parallels in any other Indo-European languages, leading to the conclusion that this tense is either a shared Greek–Sanskrit innovation or separate, coincidental developments in the two languages. In this respect, Proto-Germanic can be said to be characterized by the failure to innovate new synthetic tenses as much as the loss of existing tenses. Later Germanic languages did innovate new tenses, derived through periphrastic constructions, with Modern English likely possessing the most elaborated tense system ("Yes, the house will still be being built a month from now"). On the other hand, even the past tense was later lost (or widely lost) in most High German dialects as well as in Afrikaans.

Verbs in Proto-Germanic were divided into two main groups, called "strong" and "weak", according to the way the past tense is formed. Strong verbs use ablaut (i.e. a different vowel in the stem) and/or reduplication (derived primarily from the Proto-Indo-European perfect), while weak verbs use a dental suffix (now generally held to be a reflex of the reduplicated imperfect of PIE *dʰeh₁- originally 'put', in Germanic 'do'). Strong verbs were divided into seven main classes while weak verbs were divided into five main classes (although no attested language has more than four classes of weak verbs). Strong verbs generally have no suffix in the present tense, although some have a -j- suffix that is a direct continuation of the PIE -y- suffix, and a few have an -n- suffix or infix that continues the -n- infix of PIE. Almost all weak verbs have a present-tense suffix, which varies from class to class. An additional small, but very important, group of verbs formed their present tense from the PIE perfect (and their past tense like weak verbs); for this reason, they are known as preterite-present verbs. All three of the previously mentioned groups of verbs—strong, weak and preterite-present—are derived from PIE thematic verbs; an additional very small group derives from PIE athematic verbs, and one verb *wiljaną 'to want' forms its present indicative from the PIE optative mood.

Proto-Germanic verbs have three moods: indicative, subjunctive and imperative. The subjunctive mood derives from the PIE optative mood. Indicative and subjunctive moods are fully conjugated throughout the present and past, while the imperative mood existed only in the present tense and lacked first-person forms. Proto-Germanic verbs have two voices, active and passive, the latter deriving from the PIE mediopassive voice. The Proto-Germanic passive existed only in the present tense (an inherited feature, as the PIE perfect had no mediopassive). On the evidence of Gothic—the only Germanic language with a reflex of the Proto-Germanic passive—the passive voice had a significantly reduced inflectional system, with a single form used for all persons of the dual and plural. Note that although Old Norse (like modern Faroese and Icelandic) has an inflected mediopassive, it is not inherited from Proto-Germanic, but is an innovation formed by attaching the reflexive pronoun to the active voice.

Although most Proto-Germanic strong verbs are formed directly from a verbal root, weak verbs are generally derived from an existing noun, verb or adjective (so-called denominal, deverbal and deadjectival verbs). For example, a significant subclass of Class I weak verbs are (deverbal) causative verbs. These are formed in a way that reflects a direct inheritance from the PIE causative class of verbs. PIE causatives were formed by adding an accented suffix *-éi̯e/éi̯o to the o-grade of a non-derived verb. In Proto-Germanic, causatives are formed by adding a suffix -j/ij- (the reflex of PIE *-éi̯e/éi̯o) to the past-tense ablaut (mostly with the reflex of PIE o-grade) of a strong verb (the reflex of PIE non-derived verbs), with Verner's Law voicing applied (the reflex of the PIE accent on the *-éi̯e/éi̯o suffix). Examples:

- *bītaną (class 1) 'to bite' → *baitijaną 'to bridle, yoke, restrain', i.e. 'to make bite down'
- *rīsaną (class 1) 'to rise' → *raizijaną 'to raise', i.e. 'to cause to rise'
- *beuganą (class 2) 'to bend' → *baugijaną 'to bend (transitive)'
- *brinnaną (class 3) 'to burn' → *brannijaną 'to burn (transitive)'
- *frawerþaną (class 3) 'to perish' → *frawardijaną 'to destroy', i.e. 'to cause to perish'
- *nesaną (class 5) 'to survive' → *nazjaną 'to save', i.e. 'to cause to survive'
- *ligjaną (class 5) 'to lie down' → *lagjaną 'to lay', i.e. 'to cause to lie down'
- *faraną (class 6) 'to travel, go' → *fōrijaną 'to lead, bring', i.e. 'to cause to go', *farjaną 'to carry across', i.e. 'to cause to travel' (an archaic instance of the o-grade ablaut used despite the differing past-tense ablaut)
- *grētaną (class 7) 'to weep' → *grōtijaną 'to cause to weep'
- *lais (class 1, preterite-present) '(s)he knows' → *laizijaną 'to teach', i.e. 'to cause to know'

As in other Indo-European languages, a verb in Proto-Germanic could have a preverb attached to it, modifying its meaning (cf. e.g. *fra-werþaną 'to perish', derived from *werþaną 'to become'). In Proto-Germanic, the preverb was still a clitic that could be separated from the verb (as also in Gothic, as shown by the behavior of second-position clitics, e.g. diz-uh-þan-sat 'and then he seized', with clitics uh 'and' and þan 'then' interpolated into dis-sat 'he seized') rather than a bound morpheme that is permanently attached to the verb. At least in Gothic, preverbs could also be stacked one on top of the other (similar to Sanskrit, different from Latin), e.g. ga-ga-waírþjan 'to reconcile'.

An example verb: *nemaną 'to take' (class 4 strong verb).

		Indicative		Subjunctive		Imperative
		Active	Passive	Active	Passive	Active
Present	1st sing	*nemō	*nemôi? *nemai?	*nema-ų	???	—
Present	2nd sing	*nimizi	*nemazai	*nemaiz	*nemaizau?	*nem
Present	3rd sing	*nimidi	*nemadai	*nemai	*nemaidau?	*nemadau
Present	1st dual	*nemōz (?)	*nemandai	*nemaiw	*nemaindau?	—
Present	2nd dual	*nemadiz (?)	*nemandai	*nemaidiz (?)	*nemaindau?	*nemadiz?
Present	1st plur	*nemamaz	*nemandai	*nemaim	*nemaindau?	—
Present	2nd plur	*nimid	*nemandai	*nemaid	*nemaindau?	*nimid
Present	3rd plur	*nemandi	*nemandai	*nemain	*nemaindau?	*nemandau
Past	1st sing	*nam	—	*nēmijų (?; or *nēmį̄??)	—	
Past	2nd sing	*namt	—	*nēmīz	—	
Past	3rd sing	*nam	—	*nēmī	—	
Past	1st dual	*nēmū (?)	—	*nēmīw	—	
Past	2nd dual	*nēmudiz (?)	—	*nēmīdiz (?)	—	
Past	1st plur	*nēmum	—	*nēmīm	—	
Past	2nd plur	*nēmud	—	*nēmīd	—	
Past	3rd plur	*nēmun	—	*nēmīn	—	
Infinitive		*nemaną				
Present participle		*nemandaz				
Past participle		*numanaz				

=== Pronouns ===
Proto-Germanic personal pronouns
	First person			Second person			Third person					
	Singular	Dual	Plural	Singular	Dual	Plural	Singular			Plural		
	Singular	Dual	Plural	Singular	Dual	Plural	Masculine	Feminine	Neuter	Masculine	Feminine	Neuter
Nominative	*ek *ik^{1}	*wet *wit^{1}	*wīz *wiz^{1}	*þū	*jut	*jūz	*iz	*sī	*it	*īz	*ijōz	*ijō
Accusative	*mek *mik^{1}	*unk	*uns	*þek *þik^{1}	*inkw	*izwiz	*inǭ	*ijǭ	*it	*inz	*ijōz	*ijō
Genitive	*mīnaz	*unkeraz	*unseraz	*þīnaz	*inkweraz	*izweraz	*es	*ezōz	*es	*ezǫ̂		
Dative	*miz	*unkiz	*unsiz	*þiz	*inkwiz	*izwiz	*immai	*ezōi	*immai	*imaz		
Instrumental	*miz	*unkiz	*unsiz	*þiz	*inkwiz	*izwiz	*inō	*ezō	*inō	*imiz		

^{1} – Unstressed variant

== Examples of Finnic loans ==
Numerous early Germanic words have survived with relatively little change as borrowings in Finnic languages.

- Estonian juust, Finnish juusto < *justaz "cheese"
- Estonian/Finnish kuningas < *kuningaz "king"
- Estonian/Finnish lammas "sheep" < *lambaz "lamb"
- Finnish hurskas "pious" < *hurskaz "fast, quick, lively"
- Finnish ruhtinas "prince" < *druhtinaz "lord"
- Finnish runo "poem, rune" < *rūnō "secret, mystery, rune"
- Finnish sairas "sick" < *sairaz "sore"
- Finnish viisas "wise" < *wīsaz "wise"

== Examples of derivation of Proto-Germanic from PIE ==
=== Masculine common noun ===
*wĺ̥kʷos ("wolf") > *wúlpos > *wulfaz
Case	PIE (singular)	PG (singular)	PIE (plural)	PG (plural)
Nominative	*wĺ̥kʷos	*wulfaz	*wĺ̥kʷoes	*wulfōz, -ōs
Genitive	*wĺ̥kʷosyo	*wulfas	*wĺ̥kʷoHom	*wulfǫ̂
Dative	*wĺ̥kʷoey	*wulfai	*wĺ̥kʷomos	*wulfamaz
Accusative	*wĺ̥kʷom	*wulfą	*wĺ̥kʷoms	*wulfanz
Vocative	*wĺ̥kʷe	*wulf	*wĺ̥kʷoes	*wulfōz, -ōs
Ablative	*wĺ̥kʷead	-	*wĺ̥kʷomos	-
Locative	*wĺ̥kʷey, -oy	-	*wĺ̥kʷoysu	-
Instrumental	*wĺ̥kʷoh₁	*wulfō	*wĺ̥kʷōys	*wulfamiz

=== Feminine common noun ===
*bʰodʰh₂wéh (battle) > *badwō
Case	PIE (singular)	PG (singular)	PIE (plural)	PG (plural)
Nominative	*bʰodʰh₂wéh₂	*badwō	*bʰodʰh₂wéh₂es	*badwôz
Genitive	*bʰodʰh₂wéh₂s	*badwōz	*bʰodʰh₂wéh₂oHom	*badwǫ̂
Dative	*bʰodʰh₂wéh₂ey	*badwōi	*bʰodʰh₂wéh₂mos	*badwōmaz
Accusative	*bʰodʰh₂wéh₂m	*badwǭ	*bʰodʰh₂wéh₂m̥s	*badwōz
Vocative	*bʰodʰh₂wéh₂	*badwō	*bʰodʰh₂wéh₂es	*badwôz
Ablative	*bʰodʰh₂wéh₂s	-	*bʰodʰh₂wéh₂mos	-
Locative	*bʰodʰh₂wéh₂(i)	-	*bʰodʰh₂wéh₂su	-
Instrumental	*bʰodʰh₂wéh₂h₁	*badwō	*bʰodʰh₂wéh₂mis	*badwōmiz

=== Neuter common noun ===
*yugóm > *juką ("yoke")
Case	PIE (singular)	PG (singular)	PIE (plural)	PG (plural)
Nominative	*yugóm	*juką	*yugéh₂	*jukō
Genitive	*yugósyo	*jukas	*yugóHom	*jukǫ̂
Dative	*yugóey	*jukai	*yugómos	*jukamaz
Accusative	*yugóm	*juką	*yugéh₂	*jukō
Vocative	*yugóm	*juką	*yugéh₂	*jukō
Ablative	*yugéad	-	*yugómos	-
Locative	*yugéy/óy	-	*yugóysu	-
Instrumental	*yugóh₁	*jukō	*yugṓys	*jukamiz

=== Adjectives ===
*h₂eltós, *h₂eltéh₂, *h₂eltóm ("old", cf. Lat. altus, alta, altum, "tall") > *aldaz, *aldō, *aldą
Case	PIE singular	PG singular	PIE plural	PG plural
Nom	*h₂eltós, *h₂eltéh₂, *h₂eltóm	*aldaz, *aldō, *aldą	*h₂eltóes, *h₂eltéh₂es, *h₂eltéh₂	*aldai, *aldôz, *aldō
Gen	*h₂eltósyo, *h₂eltéh₂s, *h₂eltósyo	*aldas, *aldaizōz, *aldas	*h₂eltóHom, *h₂eltéh₂oHom, *h₂eltóHom	*aldaizǫ̂, *aldaizǫ̂, *aldaizǫ̂
Dat	*h₂eltóey, *h₂eltéh₂ey, *h₂eltóey	*aldammai, *aldaizōi, *aldammai	*h₂eltómos, *h₂eltéh₂mos, *h₂eltómos	*aldaimaz, *aldaimaz, *aldaimaz
Acc	*h₂eltóm, *h₂eltā́m, *h₂eltóm	*aldanǭ, *aldǭ, *aldą	*h₂eltóms, *h₂eltéh₂m̥s, *h₂eltéh₂	*aldanz, *aldōz, *aldō
Voc	*h₂elté, *h₂eltéh₂, *h₂eltóm	-	*h₂eltóes, *h₂eltéh₂es, *h₂eltéh₂	-
Abl	*h₂eltéad, *h₂eltéh₂s, *h₂eltéad	-	*h₂eltómos, *h₂eltéh₂mos, *h₂eltómos	-
Loc	*h₂eltéy/óy, *h₂eltéh₂(i), *h₂eltéy/óy	-	*h₂eltóysu, *h₂eltéh₂su, *h₂eltóysu	-
Instr	*h₂eltóh₁, *h₂eltéh₂h₁, *h₂eltóh₁	*aldanō, *aldaizō, *aldanō	*h₂eltṓys, *h₂eltéh₂mis, *h₂eltṓys	*aldaimiz, *aldaimiz, *aldaimiz

=== Personal pronouns (nominative form) ===
PIE	PG
*éǵ > *eǵh₂óm	*eka > *ek
*túh₂	*þū
*is, *síh₂, *íd	*iz, *sī, *it
*wéy > *wéys	*wīz
*yúHs	*jūz
*éyes, *íh₂es, *íh₂; *tóy (masc. plural of *tó~só)	*īz, ijōz, *ijō; *þai > pNo *þaiʀ > ME þey(ȝ) > English they

=== Verbs ===
*bʰéreti > *beraną ("to bear")
Pronoun	PIE	PG
I	*bʰéroh₂	*berō
You	*bʰéresi	*berizi > *birizi
He, she, it	*bʰéreti	*beridi > *biridi
We	*bʰéromos	*beramaz
You (all)	*bʰérete	*berid > *birid
They	*bʰéronti	*berandi

*h₁ésti > *wesaną ("to be")
Pronoun	PIE	PG
I	*h₁ésmi	*ezmi > *emmi > *immi
You	*h₁ési	*ezi > *izi
He, she, it	*h₁ésti	*esti > *isti
We	*h₁smós	*izum
You (all)	*h₁sté	*izud
They	*h₁sénti	*sendi > *sindi

*bʰuHyéti > *beuną ("to be")
Pronoun	PIE	PG
I	*bʰuHyóh₂	*biumi > German bin, Dutch ben
You	*bʰuHyési	*biusi > German bist, Dutch bent
He, she, it	*bʰuHyéti	*biuþi > Dutch bent
We	*bʰuHyómos	*beum
You (all)	*bʰuHyéte	*beud
They	*bʰuHyónti	*biunþi

=== Numbers ===
Number	PIE	PG
1	*h₁óynos	*ainaz
2	*dwóh₁ > *dwóh₁i	*twai
3	*tréyes	*þrejiz > *þreiz > *þrīz
4	*kʷetwóres > *kʷetwṓr	*petwṓr > *fedwōr
5	*pénkʷe	*pémpe > *fimf
6	*swéḱs	*swehs > *sehs
7	*septḿ̥ > *sepḿ̥t	*sebunt > *sebun
8	*oḱtṓw	*ahtōu
9	*h₁néwn̥	*newunt > *newun
10	*déḱm̥	*tehun

== Schleicher's PIE fable rendered into Proto-Germanic ==
August Schleicher wrote a fable in the PIE language he had just reconstructed, which, though it has been updated a few times by others, still bears his name. Below is a rendering of this fable into Proto-Germanic.

The first is a direct phonetic evolution of the PIE text. It does not take into account various idiomatic and grammatical shifts that occurred over the period. For example, the original text uses the imperfect tense, which disappeared in Proto-Germanic. The second version takes these differences into account, and is therefore closer to the language the Germanic people would have actually spoken.

Reconstructed Proto-Germanic, phonetic evolution derived from reconstructed PIE only

*Awiz ehwōz-uh: awiz, hwisi wullō ne est, spihi ehwanz, ainą kurų wagą wegandų, ainą-uh mekǭ burą, ainą-uh gumanų ahu berandų. Awiz nu ehwamaz wiuhi: hert agnutai mek, witandī ehwanz akandų gumanų. Ehwōz weuhą: hludi, awi! hert agnutai uns witundumaz: gumô, fadiz, wullǭ awją hwurniudi sibi warmą westrą. Awją-uh wullō ne isti. Þat hehluwaz awiz akrą buki.

Reconstructed Proto-Germanic, with more probable grammar and vocabulary derived from later Germanic languages

*Awiz ehwōz-uh: awiz, sō wullǭ ne habdē, sahw ehwanz, ainanǭ kurjanǭ wagną teuhandų, ainanǭ-uh mikilǭ kuriþǭ, ainanǭ-uh gumanų sneumundô berandų. Awiz nu ehwamaz sagdē: hertô sairīþi mek, sehwandē ehwanz akandų gumanų. Ehwōz sagdēdun: gahauzī, awi! hertô sairīþi uns sehwandumiz: gumô, fadiz, uz awīz wullō wurkīþi siz warmą wastijǭ. Awiz-uh wullǭ ne habaiþi. Þat hauzidaz awiz akrą flauh.

English

The Sheep and the Horses: A sheep that had no wool saw horses, one pulling a heavy wagon, one carrying a big load, and one carrying a man quickly. The sheep said to the horses: "My heart pains me, seeing a man driving horses." The horses said: "Listen, sheep, our hearts pain us when we see this: a man, the master, makes the wool of the sheep into a warm garment for himself. And the sheep has no wool." Having heard this, the sheep fled into the plain.

== See also ==
- Pre-Indo-European (disambiguation)
- Holtzmann's law
- Suebi

== Sources ==
- Bammesberger, Alfred (1990). Die Morphologie des urgermanischen Nomens. Heidelberg: Winter.
- Bennett, William Holmes (1980). An Introduction to the Gothic Language. New York: Modern Language Association of America.
- Campbell, A. (1959). Old English Grammar. London: Oxford University Press.
- Euler, Wolfram; Konrad Badenheuer (2021). Sprache und Herkunft der Germanen. Rekonstruktion des Frühurgermanischen vor der Ersten Lautverschiebung [Language and Origin of the Germanic Peoples: Reconstruction of the Early Proto-Germanic Language prior to the First Sound Shift] (2nd ed.). Berlin/London: Inspiration Un. ISBN 978-3-945127-278. (in German with English summary)
- Euler, Wolfram; Konrad Badenheuer (2025). Sprache und Herkunft der Germanen. Rekonstruktion des Frühurgermanischen vor der Ersten Lautverschiebung [Language and Origin of the Germanic Peoples: Reconstruction of the Early Proto-Germanic Language prior to the First Sound Shift] (3rd ed.). Berlin: Inspiration Unlimited. ISBN 978-3-945127-506. (in German with English summary)
- Cercignani, Fausto (1972). "Indo-European ē in Germanic". Zeitschrift für vergleichende Sprachforschung. 86 (1): 104–110.
- Cercignani, Fausto (1973). "Indo-European eu in Germanic". Indogermanische Forschungen. 78: 106–112.
- Cercignani, Fausto (1979). "Proto-Germanic */i/ and */e/ Revisited". Journal of English and Germanic Philology. 78 (1): 72–82.
- Fulk, R. D. (2018). A Comparative Grammar of the Early Germanic Languages (PDF). Amsterdam/Philadelphia: John Benjamins.
- Green, Dennis Howard (2000). Language and history in the early Germanic world. Cambridge: Cambridge University Press.
- Harðarson, Jón Axel (2018). "The Morphology of Germanic". In Jared Klein; Brian Joseph; Matthias Fritz (eds.). Handbook of Comparative and Historical Indo-European Linguistics. Vol. 2. Berlin/Boston: de Gruyter. pp. 913–954.
- Hartmann, Frederik (2023). Germanic Phylogeny. Oxford Studies in Diachronic and Historical Linguistics. Oxford University Press. ISBN 978-0-198-87273-3..
- Kapović, Mate, ed. (2017). The Indo-European Languages (2nd ed.). London: Routledge. ISBN 978-0-415-73062-4.
- Krahe, Hans; Wolfgang Meid (1969). Germanische Sprachwissenschaft (2 vols). Berlin: de Gruyter.
- Kroonen, Guus (2013). Etymological Dictionary of Proto-Germanic. Leiden Indo-European Etymological Dictionary Series, 11. Leiden: Brill Academic Publishers. ISBN 978-90-04-18340-7.
- Mallory, J.P. (1989), In Search of the Indo-Europeans, Thames and Hudson
- Orel, Vladimir (2003). A Handbook of Germanic Etymology. Leiden; Boston: Brill.
- Plotkin, Vulf (2008). The Evolution of Germanic Phonological Systems: Proto-Germanic, Gothic, West Germanic, and Scandinavian. Lewiston: Edwin Mellen.
- Polomé, Edgar C. (1992). Lippi-Green, Rosina (ed.). Recent Developments in Germanic Linguistics. John Benjamins Publishing. ISBN 978-90-272-3593-0.
- Polomé, Edgar Charles; Fee, Christopher R.; Leeming, David Adams (2006). "Germanic mythology". In Leeming, David Adams (ed.). The Oxford Companion to World Mythology. Oxford University Press. ISBN 9780199916481.
- Ringe, Don (2006). From Proto-Indo-European to Proto-Germanic. A Linguistic History of English. Vol. 1 (1st ed.). New York City: Oxford University Press. ISBN 978-0-19-928413-9. OCLC 64554645. OL 7405151M. Wikidata Q131605459.
- Ringe, Don (2017). From Proto-Indo-European to Proto-Germanic. A Linguistic History of English (2nd ed.). Oxford: Oxford University Press. doi:10.1093/oso/9780198792581.001.0001. ISBN 978-0-19-879258-1. OCLC 972772031. OL 27415350M. Wikidata Q119269648.
- Voyles, Joseph B. (1992). Early Germanic Grammar. San Diego: Academic Press. ISBN 0-12-728270-X.
- Summarizing Germanic sound shifts
