= George Cowgill =

American academic (1929–2018)

George L. Cowgill (/ˈkoʊɡɪl/; December 19, 1929 – July 31, 2018) was an American anthropologist and archaeologist. He was a professor of anthropology at Arizona State University from 1990 to 2005, and research professor emeritus from 2005 until his death. He received his PhD from Harvard in 1963 with a dissertation on The Post-Classic Period in the Southern Maya Lowlands. Most of his career was devoted to research at the ancient Mexican city of Teotihuacán. He taught at Brandeis University between 1960 and 1990. Cowgill made important contributions in a number of areas, including the archaeology of Mesoamerica, the comparative study of early states and cities, and quantitative methods in archaeology.

== Early life ==
George Cowgill and his twin brother, linguist Warren Cowgill (d. 1985), were born near Grangeville, Idaho in 1929. Along with his brother, George Cowgill graduated from Stanford University in 1952 with a degree in physics.

== Career ==
Cowgill was selected as the 1992 Distinguished Lecturer in Archaeology by the American Anthropological Association. In 2004 he was awarded the Alfred Vincent Kidder Award of the American Anthropological Association for his contributions to the archaeology of the Americas. This is one of the most prestigious awards in the field of archaeology.

Cowgill's major archaeological fieldwork and analysis was centered on Teotihuacán. With René Millon, Cowgill spent years systematically mapping the city of Teotihuacán in the Valley of Mexico near modern Mexico City. In the 1960s he compiled an extensive database of the artifacts collected in the survey. This was one of the first large-scale archaeological databases, and it continues to be used for research today. In the late 1980s, Cowgill co-directed excavations at the Feathered Serpent Pyramid at Teotihuacán with Saburo Sugiyama and Rubén Cabrera. Several of Cowgill's published articles on Teotihuacán are among the most important syntheses of archaeological information on this ancient city.

George Cowgill was also a pioneering researcher in the use of computers, databases, and quantitative methods in archaeology. He published important methodological papers on seriation (a quantitative method for determining the chronology of sites and artifacts) and on artifact classification. He and his students produced innovative studies of the spatial organization of Teotihuacán as determined from his artifact database. They were able to measure the extent of the city and track its growth and decline through the centuries for the first time.

Cowgill made a number of major contributions to the comparative study of ancient states and cities. His 1975 work on demography and population growth helped reorient archaeological studies of ancient population trends, and served to link the study of ancient demography to demographic trends in the modern world. He co-edited an influential 1988 book on the collapse of ancient states and empires. Cowgill also published important works on ancient cities around the world and their comparative analysis.

== Selected publications ==
- Cowgill, George L. (2015) Ancient Teotihuacan: Early Urbanism in Central Mexico. Cambridge University Press, New York.
- Cowgill, George L. (2004) Origins and Development of Urbanism: Archaeological Approaches. Annual Review of Anthropology 33:525-549.
- Cowgill, George L. (1997) State and Society at Teotihuacan, Mexico. Annual Review of Anthropology 26:129-161.
- Cowgill, George L. (1993) Distinguished Lecture in Archaeology: Beyond Criticizing New Archaeology. American Anthropologist 95:551-573.
- Yoffee, Norman and George L. Cowgill (editors) (1988) The Collapse of Ancient States and Civilizations. University of Arizona Press, Tucson.
- Cowgill, George L. (1975) On Causes and Consequences of Ancient and Modern Population Changes. American Anthropologist 77:505-525.
