= Warren Cowgill =

American linguist (1929–1985)

- Born: December 19, 1929; Grangeville, Idaho, U.S.
- Died: June 20, 1985 (aged 55); New Haven, Connecticut
- Spouses: Sheila Blau Levitsky (m. 1966–1970); Kathryn Louise Markhus (m. 1970)
- Children: 1 (born 1967)
- Parents: George Dewey Cowgill; Ruby Eugenia Smith Cowgill
- Relatives: George Cowgill (twin brother)

Academic background
- Education: Stanford University; Yale University
- Thesis: The Indo-European Long-Vowel Preterits (1957)
- Doctoral advisors: Paul Tedesco; Konstantin Reichardt

Academic work
- Institutions: Yale University
- Notable students: George Cardona; Raimo Anttila; Andrew Sihler; Hans Henrich Hock; Stephanie W. Jamison; Donald Ringe
- Main interests: Indo-European languages

Warren Crawford Cowgill (/ˈkoʊɡɪl/ KOH-gill; December 19, 1929 – June 20, 1985) was an American linguist. He was a professor of linguistics at Yale University and the Encyclopædia Britannica's authority on Indo-European linguistics. Two separate Indo-European sound laws are named after him, Cowgill's law of Greek and Cowgill's law of Germanic.

Cowgill was unusual among Indo-European linguists of his time in believing that Indo-European should be classified as a branch of Indo-Hittite, with Hittite as a sister language of the Indo-European languages, rather than a daughter language.

Warren Cowgill and his twin brother, anthropologist George Cowgill, were born near Grangeville, Idaho. Along with his brother, he graduated from Stanford University in 1952 and received a Ph.D. from Yale in 1957. He was a member of the Yale faculty in the Department of Linguistics until his death in 1985. At Yale, Cowgill taught many of the leading Indo-European scholars of the late 20th and early 21st centuries.
