= Keith Brown (linguist) =

British linguist

Edward Keith Brown (7 April 1935 – 23 March 2025) was a British linguist known for his work in syntax. He was professor and researcher at the University of Essex and the University of Cambridge, and editor-in-chief of the Encyclopedia of Language and Linguistics (2006).

== Life ==
Keith was born in Calcutta, India, where his father was a Methodist missionary. He moved to Britain in 1945 and was educated at Priors Court and Kingswood School in Bath.

After studying English at Cambridge University, he joined the British Council, and worked in Uganda. Together with his wife Gillian Brown (also a linguist), he taught at the University College of Cape Coast in Ghana, before moving to Edinburgh University, where he was appointed as Lecturer in General Linguistics in 1965 and where in due course he received his Ph.D. in linguistics in 1972.

In 1984 he moved to the University of Essex, where he was research professor in the Department of Linguistics, and then to the University of Cambridge, where he was senior research fellow in the Research Centre for English and Applied Linguistics. He was later an affiliated lecturer in the Department of Theoretical and Applied Linguistics, and a fellow of Pembroke College, Cambridge.

He also held visiting professorships at the Universities of Heidelberg, Vienna, and Düsseldorf. From 1990 to 1994 he was the president of the Linguistics Association of Great Britain. He was also a regular member of council of the Philological Society and served as the society's president from 2007 to 2009. He was chairman of the Linguistics Committee of the Subject Centre for Languages, Linguistics and Area Studies.

== Works ==
He served as a co-editor of Transactions of the Philological Society and sat on several other editorial boards. He was the author of Linguistics Today (Fontana, 1984) and co-author, with Jim Miller, of Syntax: A Linguistic Introduction to Sentence Structure and Syntax: Generative Grammar (Hutchinson, 1981).

He was editor in chief of the second edition of the Encyclopedia of Language and Linguistics (2006) and was joint editor, with Jim Miller, of A Concise Encyclopedia of Linguistic Theories and A Concise Encyclopedia of Grammatical Categories (Pergamon Press, 1997 and 1998). He was also a joint editor of Common Denominators in Art and Science (Aberdeen University Press, 1983), as well as Language, Reasoning and Inference (Academic Press, 1986), Linguistics in Britain: Personal Histories (with Vivien Law, Wiley, 2002), Concise Encyclopedia of Languages of the World (with Sarah Ogilvie, Elsevier, 2008), and Concise Encyclopedia of Semantics (with Keith Allan, Elsevier, 2009).
