= Encyclopedia of Language and Linguistics =

1994 encyclopedia

- Author: Ronald E. Asher, Keith Brown (editors)
- Language: English
- Publisher: Elsevier
- Publication date: 1994, 2006 (2nd edition)
- ISBN: 9780080547848

The Encyclopedia of Language and Linguistics, first published in 1994 (edited by Ronald E. Asher), with a 2nd edition in 2006 (edited by Keith Brown), is an encyclopedia of all matters related to language and linguistics.

== Reception ==
The Journal of Linguistics described it as "the definitive and indispensable scholarly reference publication, on all branches of linguistics for any library where linguistics is taken seriously." The second edition has 11,000 pages and 3,000 articles in 14 volumes.

== See also ==
- Language and Linguistics (journal)
