= Jim Miller (linguist) =

New Zealand linguist (1942–2019)

- Born: James Edward Miller; 1942
- Died: 8 February 2019 (aged 76)
- Website: https://www.lel.ed.ac.uk/~jmiller/

James Edward Miller (1942 – 8 February 2019) was a New Zealand linguist who was a professor of cognitive linguistics at the University of Auckland, and a researcher on language syntax, semantics and standardology. In the period of 2003-2007 he was Professor Emeritus of Spoken Language at the Department of Theoretical and Applied Linguistics of the University of Edinburgh.

== Life and career ==
In 1965, Miller received an M.A. at the University of Edinburgh in Russian and French, receiving a Diploma in General Linguistics a year later. He received his Ph.D. on Tense and Aspect in Russian in 1970. For the first 20 years after his graduation, his main focus of interest were aspect, case and transitivity, as well as various models of the generative grammar framework.

In the late 1970s, Miller investigated the syntax of Scottish English together with Keith Brown, which eventually led him to the research of a more general notion of syntax of spontaneous spoken language (in English, Russian, and French), as well as the relation of spoken and written language, literacy, and the relationship of language and politics, education and identity. As a result of this research, he published a book, Spontaneous Spoken Language, together with Regina Weinert in 1998.

Miller's career spanned a wide range of linguistics topics, including, but not limited to speaking, writing and language acquisition, as well as topics on spoken language, non-standard language, and typology. He died on 8 February 2019, at the age of 76.

== Books ==
- Semantics and Syntax: Parallels and Connections (1985)
- Syntax: A Linguistic Introduction to Sentence Structure (1992, with E K Brown, James V Miller)
- Spontaneous Spoken Language : Syntax and Discourse (1998, with Regina Weinert)
- An Introduction to English Syntax (2000)
