= Gillian Brown (linguist) =

British linguist

- Born: 23 January 1937 (age 89)

Academic work
- Discipline: Linguist
- Sub-discipline: Discourse analysis

Gillian Brown CBE (born 1937) is a British linguist. She is known for her expertise on discourse analysis, and was professor at Clare College Cambridge.

== Life ==
After studying English at Girton College Cambridge, Gillian moved to Uganda and began her study of Bantu languages. Together with her husband Keith Brown (also a linguist), she taught at the University College of Cape Coast in Ghana, before moving to Edinburgh University where she was appointed as Lecturer in General Linguistics in 1965. She obtained a Ph.D. from the University of Edinburgh in 1971, presenting the thesis "Aspects of a phonology of Lumasaaba", which was later published as Phonological rules and dialect variation (Cambridge University Press, 1972).

In 1983, she became professor of Applied Linguistics and Dean of the School of Social Studies at the University of Essex, and in 1988 became Professor and Founding Director of the Research Centre in English and Applied Linguistics at the University of Cambridge. She joined Clare College Cambridge as a fellow, where she worked until 2004.

Her research interests were listening comprehension; what makes a text difficult to understand; and literary stylistics. She was a member of the 1988 Kingman Committee, appointed by the British government to look at the training of teachers of English as a mother tongue.

She has served on university, national, and international committees, and in June 1992, she received a CBE in recognition of her work. Throughout her career she wrote many articles, and gave papers at universities and conferences in North America, Europe, Scandinavia, India, Russia, China, and Japan.

== Books ==
- Phonological Rules and Dialect Variation: A Study of the Phonology of Lumasaaba (Cambridge University Press, 1972)
- Listening to Spoken English (Longman, 1977)
- Questions of Intonation (Routledge, 1980)
- Teaching the Spoken Language (Cambridge University Press, 1983)
- Discourse Analysis (Cambridge University Press, 1983)
- Performance and Competence in Second Language Acquisition
- Speakers, Listeners and Communication: Explorations in Discourse Analysis (Cambridge University Press, 1995)
