= Language: Introductory Readings =

Book edited by Paul Eschholz; Alfred Rosa; Virginia Clark

- Second edition (1977)
- Author: Paul Eschholz; Alfred Rosa; Virginia Clark (editors)
- Language: English
- Subject: linguistics
- Genre: textbook
- Publisher: Macmillan Education
- Publication date: 1972 (1st ed), 2020 (13th ed)
- Media type: Print (hardcover)

Language: Introductory Readings is a textbook edited by Paul Eschholz, Alfred Rosa and Virginia Clark in which the authors provide an introduction to linguistics. It is described as a well-known introductory text in linguistics.
