= Don Ringe (linguist) =

American linguist (born 1954)

- Born: 1954 (age 71–72)

Academic background
- Education: Yale University
- Thesis: The Perfect Tenses in Greek Inscriptions (1984)
- Doctoral advisor: Warren Cowgill

Academic work
- Discipline: Historical linguistics; mathematical linguistics
- Sub-discipline: Indo-European linguistics; Germanic linguistics; Ancient Greek; Tocharian linguistics; Morphology
- Institutions: Bard College; University of Pennsylvania

Donald A. Ringe Jr. (/ˈrɪndʒ/ RINJ; born 1954) is an American linguist and Indo-Europeanist.

He has been described as a historical linguist and as a mathematical linguist. He is multi-lingual. He employs mathematics in his work on language family trees and the Proto-Indo-European language.

Ringe graduated from University of Kentucky and received a Master of Philosophy in linguistics as a Marshall Scholar from the University of Oxford. He received a Ph.D. in linguistics at Yale University in 1984, under the supervision of Warren Cowgill. He taught Classics at Bard College from 1983 to 1985. Since 1985, he has been on the Faculty in Linguistics at the University of Pennsylvania, where he has been a full professor since 1996.

He is the author of numerous articles and books, chiefly on historical Indo-European linguistics, especially Ancient Greek, Tocharian and the Germanic languages.

== Books ==
- Ringe, Donald A. (1992). On Calculating the Factor of Chance in Language Comparison. Philadelphia: American Philosophical Society. ISBN 0-87169-821-8.
- Ringe, Donald (1996). On the Chronology of Sound Changes in Tocharian. Volume 1: From Proto-Indo-European to Proto-Tocharian. New Haven, CT: American Oriental Society. ISBN 0940490803.
- Ringe, Don (2006). From Proto-Indo-European to Proto-Germanic. Oxford: Oxford University Press. ISBN 0-19-928413-X.
  - Ringe, Don (2017) [2006]. From Proto-Indo-European to Proto-Germanic (second ed.). Oxford: Oxford University Press. ISBN 978-0198792581.
- Ringe, Donald; Eska, Joseph (2013). Historical Linguistics: Toward a Twenty-First Century Reintegration. Cambridge: Cambridge University Press. ISBN 9780521587112.
- Ringe, Don; Taylor, Ann (2014). The Development of Old English. Oxford: Oxford University Press. ISBN 9780199207848.
- Ringe, Don (2018). An Introduction to Grammar for Language Learners. Cambridge: Cambridge University Press. ISBN 978-1-108-42515-5.
- Ringe, Don (2021). A Historical Morphology of English. Edinburgh: Edinburgh University Press. ISBN 9781474459761.
- Ringe, Don (2024). The Linguistic Roots of Ancient Greek. Oxford: Oxford University Press. ISBN 9780198879022.
