= Numismatics Cabinet =

Museum collection

Numismatics Cabinet (City Museum)
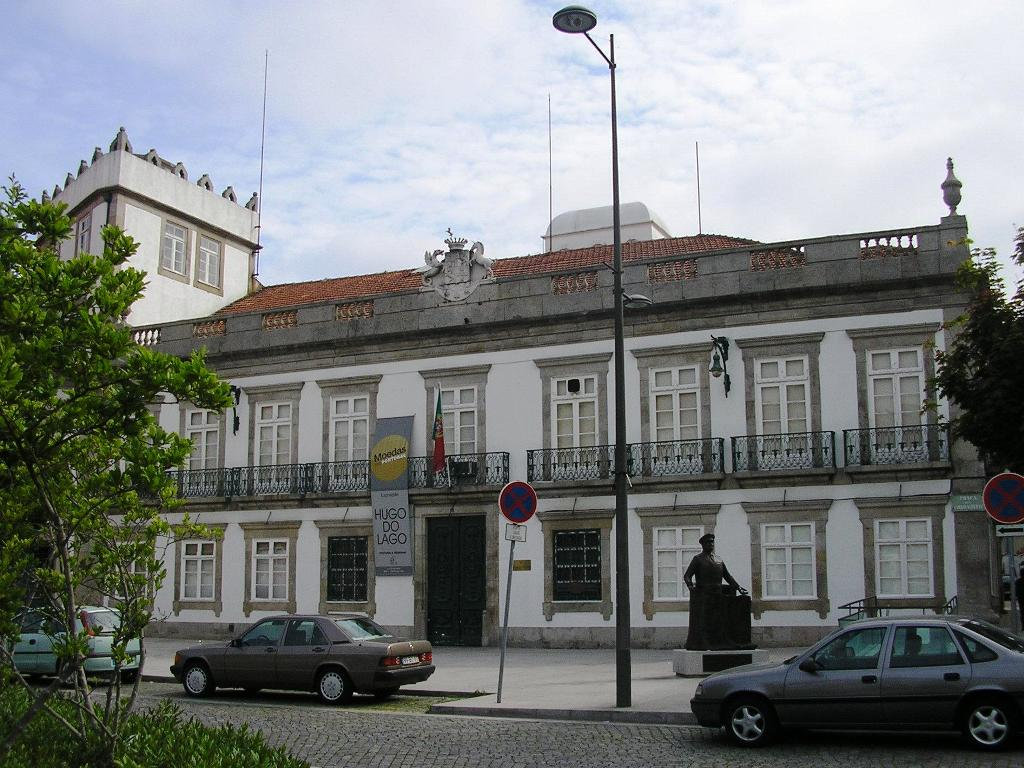
- Palacete Viscondes Balsemao, home of the Numismatics Cabinet
- Established: 1852
- Location: Palacete of the Visconts of Balsemão, Porto
- Type: Numismatic
- Website: Institution's website

The Numismatics Cabinet (Gabinete de Numismática) is one of the museum collections that make up the Museum of Porto, housing one of the largest collections of numismatics in Portugal, focusing notably on Greek, Roman, Visigothic, Christian kingdoms, Arab, and Portuguese coins.

The collection is currently housed in the Palacete of the Viscounts of Balsemão and was last displayed in Casa do Infante in 2023. Plans to move the collection to a refurbished facility at the former Abrigo dos Pequeninos, announced in 2017, remain incomplete as of February 2024.

== Museum of Porto ==
The Museum of Porto is a group of municipal museums and collections scattered throughout the city of Porto. Alongside the Numismatics Cabinet, its holdings include the archaeological site of Rua D. Hugo, Casa do Infante, the Port Wine Museum, and the Romantic Museum.

== The collection ==
The Numismatics Cabinet holds a significant array of coins, medals, decorations, stamps, and banknotes, spanning various historical periods from antiquity to the High Middle Ages. Among the items are Greek coins, Roman Republican denarii, Roman Imperial aurei, and coins from the Suevic, Visigothic, and Hispano-Arab periods. Notable pieces include a gold bracteate from the 4th century BCE, discovered in Bragança in 1849, as well as medieval and modern Portuguese coins, such as the morabitinos of Sancho I. The collection also features medals associated with the Peninsular Wars and the Liberal Wars.

== History ==
The collection was started by João Allen (1781–1848), a wealthy British merchant who lived in Porto, and gradually expanded by the municipality through donations, purchases and new findings. In 1850, following his death, it was acquired by the municipality for the establishment of the Porto Municipal Museum, inaugurated in 1852 on Rua da Restauração.

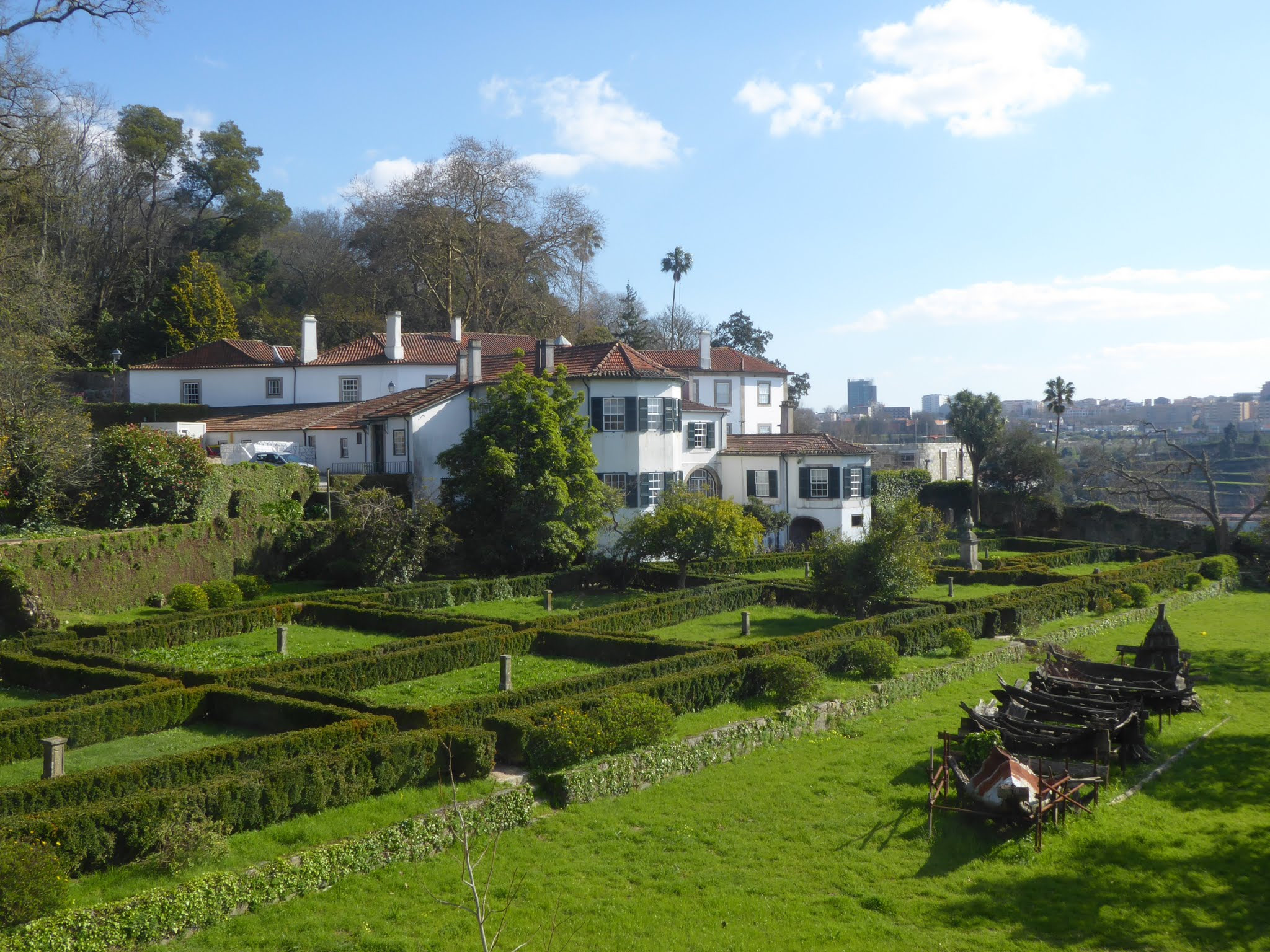
Casa Tait, where the Numismatics Cabinet was housed from 1988 to 2009

In 1905, the original collection was moved to the Municipal Library of Porto. In 1937, the collection was cataloged and moved to Carrancas Pallace, ahead of the inauguration of the Soares dos Reis National Museum in 1942. In December 1988, the collection was relocated to Casa Tait and in September 2008 it was moved to the Palacete of the Viscounts of Balsemão.

In 2017, plans were announced to transfer the collection to the former Abrigo dos Pequeninos, a former shelter for poor children. The museum in the Palacete of the Viscounts of Balsemão was closed for maintenance on 1 February 2018. The collection was last displayed in Casa do Infante in 2023, but as of February 2024, renovations of the Abrigo dos Pequeninos had yet to be completed.

== See also ==
- List of numismatic museums
- List of museums in Portugal

== Bibliography ==
- Gilabert González, L. M. Museum Management: Analysis of museum policies in the Iberian Peninsula. Doctoral thesis. University of Murcia. 2001.
- Gilabert González, L. M. "Museums, management, and cultural heritage: The Oporto city project". In PASOS. Journal of Tourism and Cultural Heritage. Vol. 13, No. 1. 2015. Pages 93–112.
- Pereira, Isabel. "The development of numismatic science in the modern era: Presentation techniques and research projects". In ICOMON. 2003.
