= Varinia gens =

Ancient Roman family

The gens Varinia was a minor plebeian family of ancient Rome. Only a few members of this gens are mentioned by Roman writers, including Publius Varinius Glaber, praetor in 73 BC, and perhaps a second time in 66, but many others are known from inscriptions. Beginning in the first century, a number of Varinii appear in inscriptions from Philippi in Macedonia. Another family of Varinii settled in Hispania Baetica.

== Origin ==
The nomen Varinius belongs to a class of gentilicia formed from cognomina ending in the diminutive or derivative suffix -inus. Varinus would have been an elaboration of the cognomen Varus, "knock-kneed".

== Praenomina ==
The main praenomina of the Varinii were Marcus, Quintus, and Gaius, all of which were amongst the most common names at all periods of Roman history. Other praenomina appearing amongst the Varinii include Gnaeus, Lucius, Publius, and Tiberius.

== Members ==
This list includes abbreviated praenomina. For an explanation of this practice, see filiation.

- Publius Varinius Glaber, praetor in 73 BC, was sent to quell the revolt of Spartacus, but his hastily-assembled forces were defeated by the rebels on multiple occasions. In Appian and other sources, he is confused with the praetor Gaius Claudius Glaber, who was also sent against Spartacus, and outmaneuvered. Varinius may have been praetor a second time in 66, and then propraetor in Asia.
- Tiberius Varinius Ti. l. Dioplutus, a freedman named in an inscription from Praeneste in Latium, dating from the first half of the first century, along with his wife, the freedwoman Marcia Chrysario, the freedman Titus Cassius Antiochus, and his wife, the freedwoman Aufidia Tyrannis.
- Gaius Varinius Eros, bought a pot from Gaius Cornelius Hermia to place in a sepulchre at Rome, dating from the first half of the first century. Another part of the same inscription indicates that Phaedra, the two-year-old daughter of Sextus Appuleius Hymen, was buried there.
- Marcus Varinius, flamen of the imperial cult and one of the municipal duumvirs at Philippi in Macedonia, buried in a first-century sepulchre at Philippi, along with his children, Varinius Furnianus and Varinia Quarta.
- Marcus Varinius M. l. Celer, a freedman buried in a first-century tomb at Philippi, along with his wife, Varinia Marita, daughters, Primigenia and Pyralis, and son-in-law, Curius Alcimus.
- Varinia M. f. Ingenua, buried in a first-century tomb at Philippi.
- Varinia Marita, buried in a first-century tomb at Philippi, along with her husband, Marcus Varinius Celer, daughters, Primigenia and Pyralis, and son-in-law, Curius Alcimus.
- (Varinia) M. f. Primigenia, buried in a first-century tomb at Philippi, along with her parents, Marcus Varinius Celer and Varinia Marita, sister, Pyralis, and Curius Alcimus, probably her brother-in-law.
- (Varinia) M. f. Pyralis, buried in a first-century tomb at Philippi, along with her parents, Marcus Varinius Celer and Varinia Marita, sister, Primigenia, and Curius Alcimus, probably her husband, but possibly her brother-in-law.
- (Marcus?) Varinius M. f. Furnianus, buried in a first-century sepulchre at Philippi, along with his father, Marcus Varinius, flamen and duumvir, and his sister, Varinia Quarta.
- Varinia Macedonia, together with her sister, Procula, built a first-century tomb at Philippi for their father, Varinius Macedonius, one of the magistrates of the town.
- Varinius Macedonius, aedile, quaestor, and duumvir at Philippi, was buried there in a first-century tomb built by his daughters, Varinia Macedonia and Procula, using the proceeds of their father's will.
- (Varinia) Procula, together with her sister, Varinia Macedonia, built a first-century tomb at Philippi for their father, Varinius Macedonius, one of the magistrates of the town.
- Varinia M. f. Quarta, buried in a first-century sepulchre at Philippi, along with her father, Marcus Varinius, and brother, Varinius Furnianus.
- Varinia Successa, buried at Rome, aged fourteen years, seven months, and sixteen days, in a first-century tomb built by her parents.
- Marcus Varinius M. f. Philippicus, a decurion buried in a first- or second-century tomb at Philippi, along with his wife, Petronia Rufina, and daughter, Varinia Philippica. The inscription naming them is suspected of being modern.
- Varinia M. f. M. n. Philippica, buried in a first- or second-century tomb at Philippi along with her parents, Marcus Varinius Philippus and Petronia Rufina. The inscription may be a forgery.
- Varinius Priscus, made a bronze label found at Rome, dating from the first or second century, for Marcus Valerius Herma.
- Varinius Celer, buried at Philippi, aged fifty-five, in a tomb dating between the first and third centuries.
- Varinius Sosias, a little boy buried at Philippi, aged two, in a tomb built by his father, Varinius Zosas, dating between the first and third centuries.
- Varinius Zosas, built a tomb at Philippi, dating between the first and third centuries, for his young son, Varinius Sosias.
- Gaius Varinius Canax, together with Sextus Marcius Teris, one of the governors of the municipium of Gabii in Latium between AD 24 and 26, during the reign of Tiberius.
- Varinius, one of the caretakers for the seviri Augustales at Philippi in Macedonia in AD 56.
- Marcus Varinius Chresimus, one of the donors to the local priesthood, whose names appear in a second-century inscription from Philippi.
- Quintus Varinius Q. f. Laevinius, an aedile at Lanuvium in Latium at some point in the Antonine Dynasty.
- Varinia Crispinilla, together with her sons, Flavius Vindex and Flavius Quietus, dedicated a tomb at Rome for her husband, Sextus Flavius Quietus, a centurion primus pilus in the Legio XX Valeria Victrix, stationed in Britain during the latter part of the second century.
- Quintus Varinius Severinus, a soldier in the century of Aelius Torquatus, in the fifth cohort of the vigiles at Rome in AD 210.

=== Undated Varinii ===
- Gnaeus Varinius, buried at Ostia in Latium.
- Quintus Varinius Q. f. Beatus, a young man buried at Rome along with various freedmen. The inscription indicates that his father was also named Quintus Varinius Beatus.
- Varinia Q. Ɔ. l. Civitas, buried at Rome, along with Quintus Varinius Salvius and his wife, Fadia, Quintus Varinius Beatus, and Quintus Varinius Demosthenes. All except for Fadia and Beatus were freedmen.
- Quintus Varinius Q. l. Demosthenes, buried at Rome, along with Quintus Varinius Salvius and his wife, Fadia, Quintus Varinius Beatus, and Varinia Civitas. All except for Fadia and Beatus were freedmen.
- Varinia Flaccina, daughter of the duumvir Gaius Varinius Pietatus, for whom she dedicated a tomb at Ugultunia in Hispania Baetica. Together with her husband, the senator Licinius Serenianus, Varinia made an offering to Juno Regina, at the site of modern Alhanje, formerly part of Baetica, on behalf of their daughter, Varinia Serena.
- Varinia M. f. Marcia, buried at Philippi.
- Varinius Philocalus, named in an inscription from Philippi.
- Gaius Varinius Pietatus, a duumvir and flamen in Hispania Baetica, was buried at Ugultunia in that province, aged seventy-one, in a tomb built by his daughter, Varinia Flaccina.
- Varinia L. l. Quarta, a freedwoman buried at Orippo in Hispania Baetica, along with Optatus, likely a freedman, in a tomb built by the freedwoman Varinia Tyche.
- Marcus Varinius Sabinus, built a tomb at Rome for Saturninus, his son and slave, aged twenty-one years, ten months.
- Quintus Varinius Q. l. Salvius, buried at Rome, along with his wife, Fadia, Quintus Varinius Beatus, Quintus Varinius Demosthenes, and Varinia Civitas. All except for Fadia and Beatus were freedmen.
- Varinia Secunda, the freedwoman of Urbana, named in an inscription from Narbo in Gallia Narbonensis, along with Gaius Maius Masculus, the freedman of Philargurus.
- Varinia Serena, the daughter of Licinius Serenianus and Varinia Flaccina, who made an offering to Juno Regina at the site of modern Alhanje on their daughter's behalf.
- Varinia Serena, buried at the site of modern Arroyo de San Serván, formerly part of Lusitania, aged thirty-two, in a tomb describing her as the best of mothers. The inscription is suspected of being modern.
- (Marcus) Varinius M. f. Severus, buried at Philippi, along with his father, Marcus Varinius Sphaerus, in a tomb built by his mother, Secunda.
- Marcus Varinius Sphaerus, buried at Philippi, aged fifty, along with his son, Varinius Severus, in a tomb built by his wife, Secunda.
- Varinius Tarsa, buried at Philippi, aged forty, along with Secunda, perhaps his wife, aged twenty-five.
- Varinia L. l. Tyche, a freedwoman who built a tomb at Orippo for the freedwoman Varinia Quarta and Optatus, probably a freedman.

== See also ==
- List of Roman gentes

== Bibliography ==
- Appianus Alexandrinus (Appian), Bellum Civile (The Civil War).
- Marcus Tullius Cicero, Pro Flacco.
- Lucius Annaeus Florus, Epitome de T. Livio Bellorum Omnium Annorum DCC (Epitome of Livy: All the Wars of Seven Hundred Years).
- Titus Livius (Livy), History of Rome.
- Lucius Mestrius Plutarchus (Plutarch), Lives of the Noble Greeks and Romans (Parallel Lives).
- Gaius Sallustius Crispus (Sallust), Historiae (The Histories).
- Boletín de la Real Academia de la Historia.
- Cédric Brélaz, Corpus des inscriptions grecques et latines de Philippes, vol. 2: "La colonie romaine", part 1: "La vie publique de la colonie", Athens (2014).
- T. Robert S. Broughton, The Magistrates of the Roman Republic, American Philological Association (1952–1986).
- René Cagnat et alii, L'Année épigraphique (The Year in Epigraphy, abbreviated AE), Presses Universitaires de France (1888–present).
- Maria Letizia Caldelli, Epigrafia ostiense dopo il CIL. 2000 iscrizioni funerarie, Venice (2018).
- George Davis Chase, "The Origin of Roman Praenomina", in Harvard Studies in Classical Philology, vol. VIII, pp. 103–184 (1897).
- Dictionary of Greek and Roman Biography and Mythology, William Smith, ed., Little, Brown and Company, Boston (1849).
- Hispania Epigraphica (Epigraphy of Spain), Madrid (1989–present).
- Theodor Mommsen et alii, Corpus Inscriptionum Latinarum (The Body of Latin Inscriptions, abbreviated CIL), Berlin-Brandenburgische Akademie der Wissenschaften (1853–present).
- Peter Pilhofer, Philippi, vol. 2: "Katalog der Inschriften von Philippi", Tübingen (Second Ed., 2009).
- Paul von Rohden, Elimar Klebs, & Hermann Dessau, Prosopographia Imperii Romani (The Prosopography of the Roman Empire, abbreviated PIR), Berlin (1898).
