= Ancient Iberian coinage =

The spread of minting in Iberia from the fifth century BC to the first century AD (known and likely locations)

Ancient Iberian coinage began in the fifth century BC, and widespread minting and circulation in the Iberian peninsula began late in the third century, during the Second Punic War. Civic coinages - emissions made by individual cities at their own volition - continued under the first two and a half centuries of Roman control until ending in the mid-first century AD. Some non-civic coins were minted on behalf of Roman emperors during this period and continued to be minted after the cessation of the civic coinages. After the cessation of the civic coinages, these Imperial coins were the only coins minted in Iberia until the coins of the Suebi and Visigoths.

Ancient Iberia was connected to the eastern and central Mediterranean, and so there are links to the Greek, Roman and Punic (Carthaginian) civic coinages. There are also many differences that reflect dynamics within Iberia itself.

== The colonial background: 6th century BC to the Second Punic War (-218 BC) ==
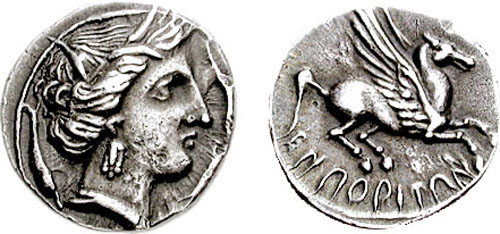

First side of the image: O: Head Arethusa right, Sicilian style, with three dolphins.
Second side of the image: R: Pegasus right, legend in Greek: 'ΕΜΠΟΡΙΤΩΝ' (Emporion).
Silver drachma of the Greek colony of Emporion, 241-218 BC, CNH 20:15

Small numbers of coins minted in other parts of the Mediterranean had circulated along the eastern coast of Spain perhaps from the sixth century, with an uptick from the fourth century. These coins were part of a colonial frontier economy in which indigenous towns traded wines, ceramics and finished goods primarily for raw materials: precious metals, wood, food products and perhaps slaves. Some coins may also have been earned by Iberian mercenaries fighting overseas.

Throughout the western Mediterranean, new coinage traditions appear around the 4th century. Non-Greek cities in the Italian Peninsula (including Rome) begin minting in the 4th and early 3rd century. Carthage minted from the mid-4th century, as with the Greek tradition following earlier emissions from Phoenician colonies in Sicily. In the north of the Iberian peninsula, the Massiliote Greek colonies of Emporion and Rhode minted mainly silver coins from the mid-fifth and late fourth centuries, respectively. Further to the south, the Phoenician colonies of Ebusus and Gadir minted bronze coins from the second half of the fourth and early third centuries, respectively. Additionally, the prominent Iberian town of Arse (Roman Saguntum) minted bronze and silver coins from the middle of the fourth century.

Within Iberian society, wealth could take a variety of forms, sometimes regionally specific. The discovery of mixed hoards containing coins, jewellery and precious metal bullion suggests that coins were being used as part of a range of ways to store, display and exchange wealth. For example, a late fifth century hoard found in a wall in the Iberian town of Puig de la Nau contained four gold earrings, a gold stud, a silver bracelet and a silver coin from Emporion. In many such hoards, some of the silver has been cut into small pieces, which can be related to finds of weights and scales and suggests that this metal circulated as a form of 'proto-money'.

== Second Punic War (218-205 BC in Iberia) ==
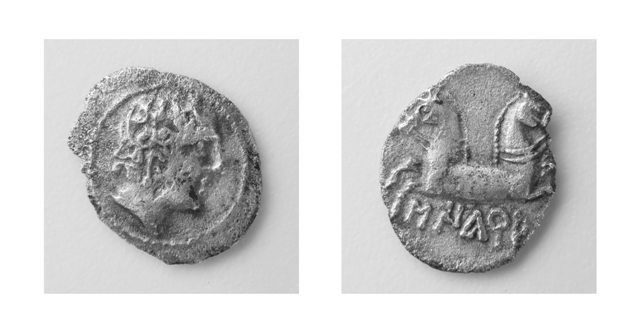

First side of the image: O: Male head right.
Second side of the image: R: Two-headed horse, legend in Iberian: 'SIKARA'.
Silver tetartamorion, Second Punic War

Part of the Second Punic War was fought in the Iberian Peninsula and coins were used by combatants on all sides. This led to a widespread and dramatic increase in the number of places where coins were minted and the amount of coin in circulation.

To fund their war effort, the Carthaginians minted gold, electrum, silver and bronze coins. These coins may have been minted in the Barcid 'capital' of Carthago Nova or perhaps were minted simply in Carthaginian military camps. In addition to these coins and those of Gadir and Ebusus, Phoenician colonies along the south coast such as Malaka and Sexi also minted bronze coins.

Along the east coast and particularly in the northeast a great number of towns minted silver drachmas. Some of these coins imitate the drachmas of Emporion or Massalia, while others have Iberian legends, a few of which can be related to towns or peoples but many of which are unknown or illegible. This silver coinage is generally seen as minted by the pro-Roman side, particularly as little Roman coin seems to have reached the Peninsula given the concurrent fighting in the Italian Peninsula. But given the fluid situation of the war, particularly in the early years, some of these emissions may have been minted to aid the Carthaginian cause.

== Republican coinage (190s-72 BC) ==
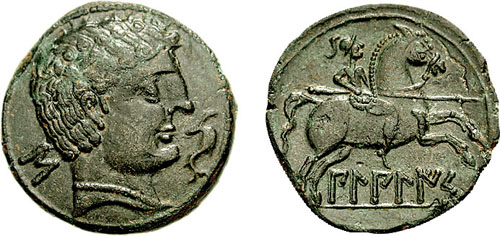

First side of the image: O: Male head right, with dolphin and 'S'.
Second side of the image: R: Horseman (jinete) right with spear, legend in Iberian: 'BILBILIS'.
Iberian bronze 'jinete' aes or single unit, late 2nd-early 1st century BC, cf. CNH 238:2

After this war, and the subsequent Roman annexation of much of the Peninsula, many indigenous towns and a few Roman colonial towns minted civic coins over the second and early first centuries. The main catalogue for these coins is the Corpus nummum hispaniae ante Augusti aetatem (CNH) but see also the more recent Diccionario de cecas y pueblos hispánicos. The indigenous towns in Hispania Citerior minted coins with Iberian scripts and either Iberian or Celtiberian legends. These coins were often typologically similar, with a heroic male portrait on the obverse and a horseman on the reverse - the so-called "jinete" (horseman) coins. The areas in which coins were minted and circulating expanded as Roman control was spread into the interior of the Peninsula. The legends and iconography on coins from Hispania Ulterior were more diverse, with Latin legends common but also some Iberian scripts while Punic continued to be used in the old Phoenician colonies along the south coast. Hence although coins from this era are often called Iberian coins, this description does not cover all coins minted during the Republic. Indeed, a smaller number of Roman colonial towns minted in Latin, following Italian and Roman examples more closely. These include Valentia and Toletum. The numbers of towns minting peaked in the last third of the second century and early first century, and then declined rapidly in the early first century, particularly in Hispania Citerior after the end of the Sertorian War.

The purpose of these coins is unclear. They may be related to ad hoc Roman tribute demands or rents on land confiscated by Rome. But the amounts minted are insufficient to represent regular taxation or legionary pay. Widely varying levels of production suggest that the reasons each town minted were diverse. Some coins seem tightly related to particular extractive or productive activities, such as mining camps in the south or fish-salting industries along the south coast. As the decision to mint was taken by local communities, and many elements of the legends and iconography seem locally significant, there may have been a strong element of local pride and identity at stake. Once in circulation, Iberian coins predominantly stayed within the region where they were minted although some did travel further afield. The production of many bronze coins and even many fractions as well as high numbers of coins found throughout all different types of site, from large towns to small farms, suggest a wide range of everyday uses.

== Late Republican and Julio-Claudian coinage (72 BC-41 AD) ==
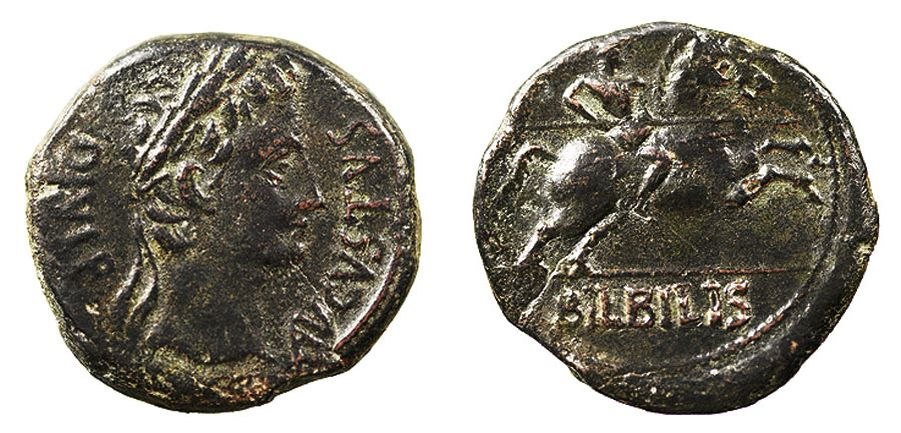

First side of the image: O: Portrait of Augustus right, 'AUGUSTUS DIVI F'.
Second side of the image: R: Horseman (jinete) right with spear, legend 'BILBILIS'.
Provincial bronze aes, reign of Augustus

From around the mid-first century BC, the number of towns emitting coins decreased and Latin legends were standardised throughout the Peninsula. Coins were mainly now emitted by more important towns that had received privileged juridical status from victorious Roman generals in the Civil Wars and then from the new Julio-Claudian emperors Augustus and Tiberius. Many of the coins emitted proclaim the new status of emitting towns as Roman coloniae or municipia, and individual civic iconography was used with strong similarities to that used in other Roman provinces and media. These emissions are conventionally called (Roman) Provincial coins. The main catalogue for these coins is Volume I of the Roman Provincial Coinage (RPC).

A handful of mints in eastern Iberia did attempt to retain the jinete coins with bilingual Iberian and Latin legends, but this did not become popular. The peak of these provincial emissions was under Augustus and Tiberius, and the last 'local' coins were emitted under the emperor Caligula, in the mid-first century AD. This cessation of local coinage in the mid-first century AD was not unique to Hispania but occurred throughout the western Provinces. From that point on the only emissions in Roman Hispania were emissions from a few Imperial mints controlled by the emperor and used for purposes such as legionary pay.

Two main reasons are given for the provincial emissions. Firstly, the new municipia and coloniae wanted to advertise their status and Imperial favour. Secondly, these new constitutional forms came with state expenses. These emissions may have been intended to partly meet such expenses. Once these coins were in circulation, they were likely used in the broad range of roles coins played in Roman monetised economic life.

== Gallery ==
Coins of Hispania Citerior, 2nd century to early 1st century

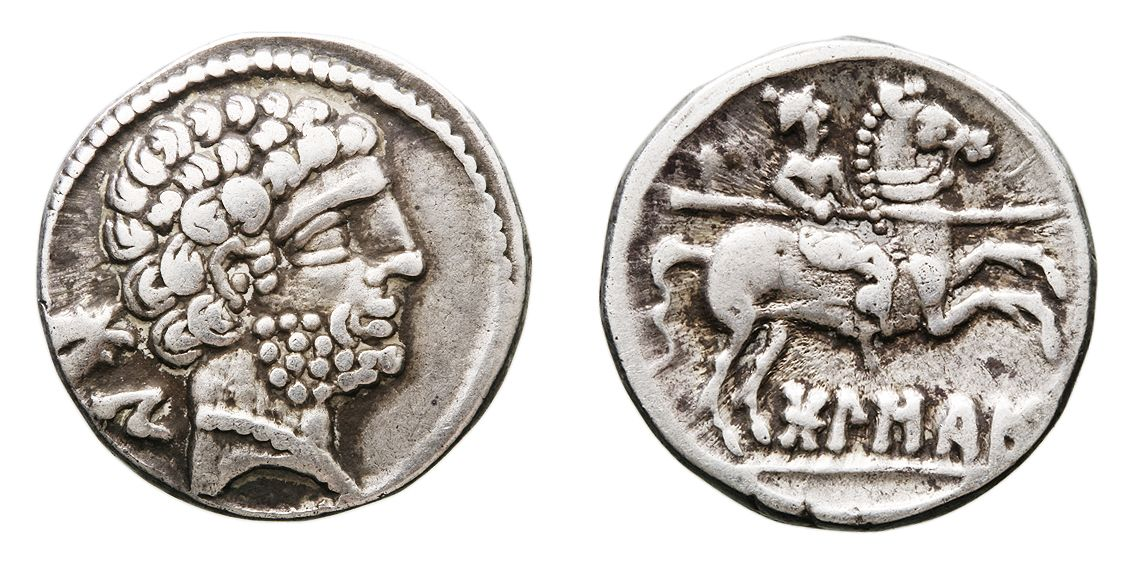
Silver 'Iberian jinete' denarius of BOLSKAN (Huesca)

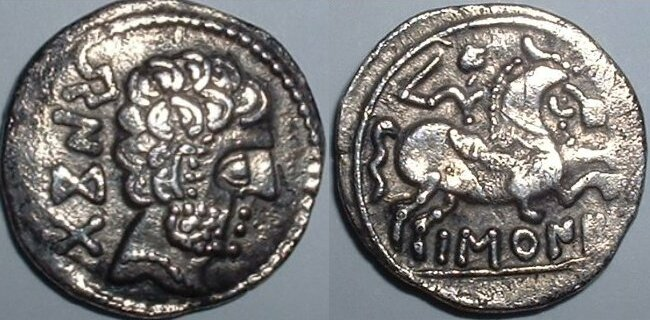
Silver 'Iberian jinete' denarius of BARSKUNES (Unknown location, maybe southern Navarre)

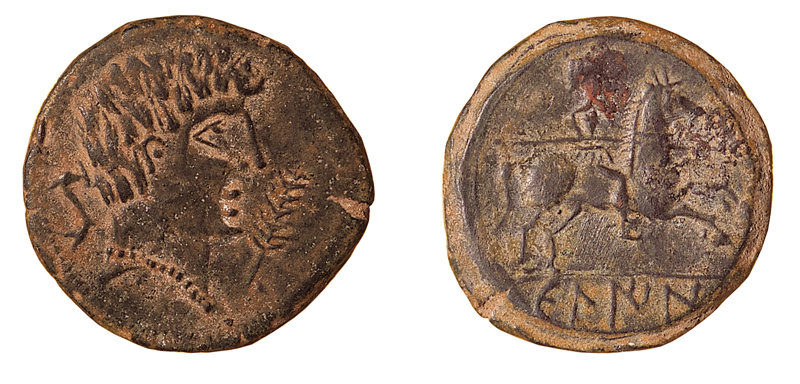
Bronze 'Iberian jinete' aes of KELIN (Caudete de las Fuentes), mid 2nd century

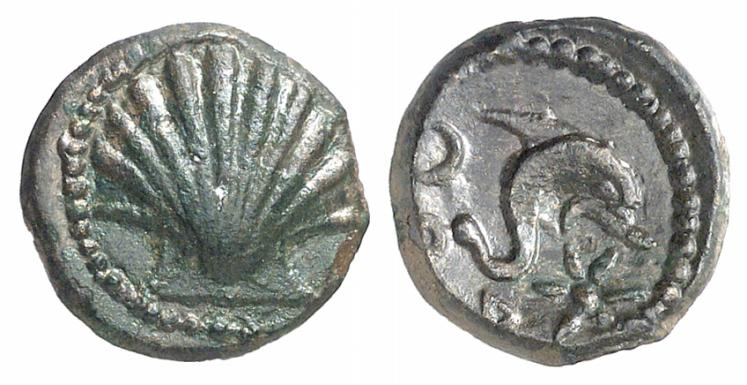
Bronze sextans of ARSE (Sagunto)

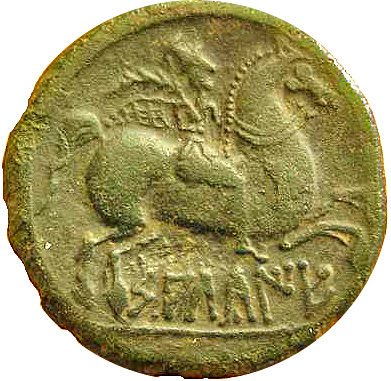
Bronze 'Iberian jinete' aes of SALDUIE (Zaragoza)

Coins of Hispania Ulterior, 2nd century to early 1st century

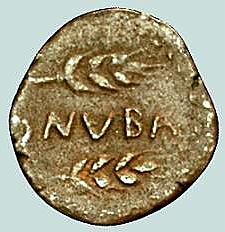
Bronze aes of Onuba (Huelva), early 1st century BC

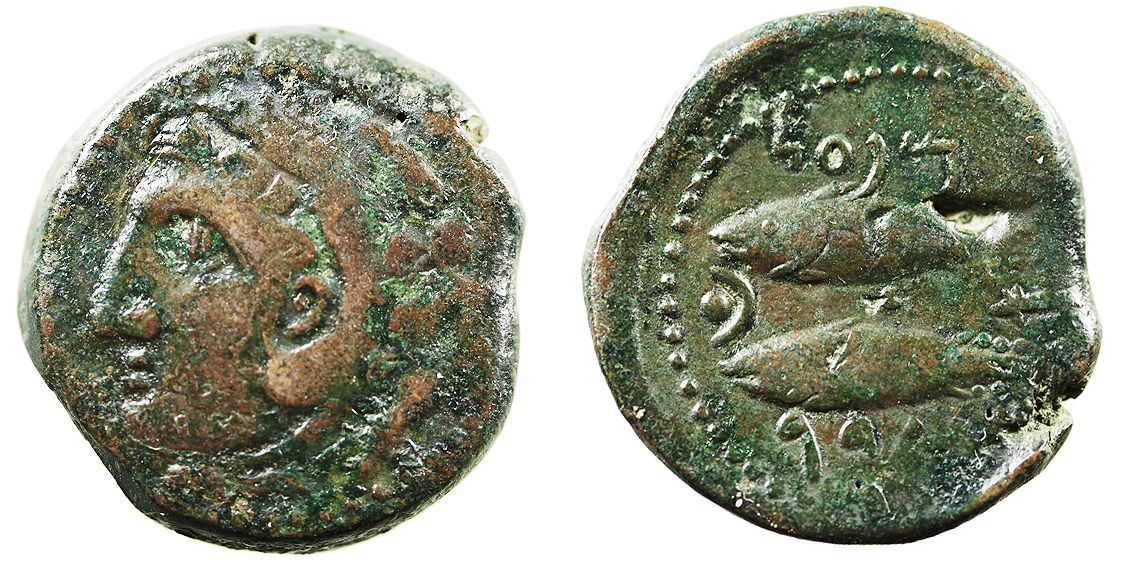
Bronze aes of Gadir (Cádiz), unknown date, Punic legend.

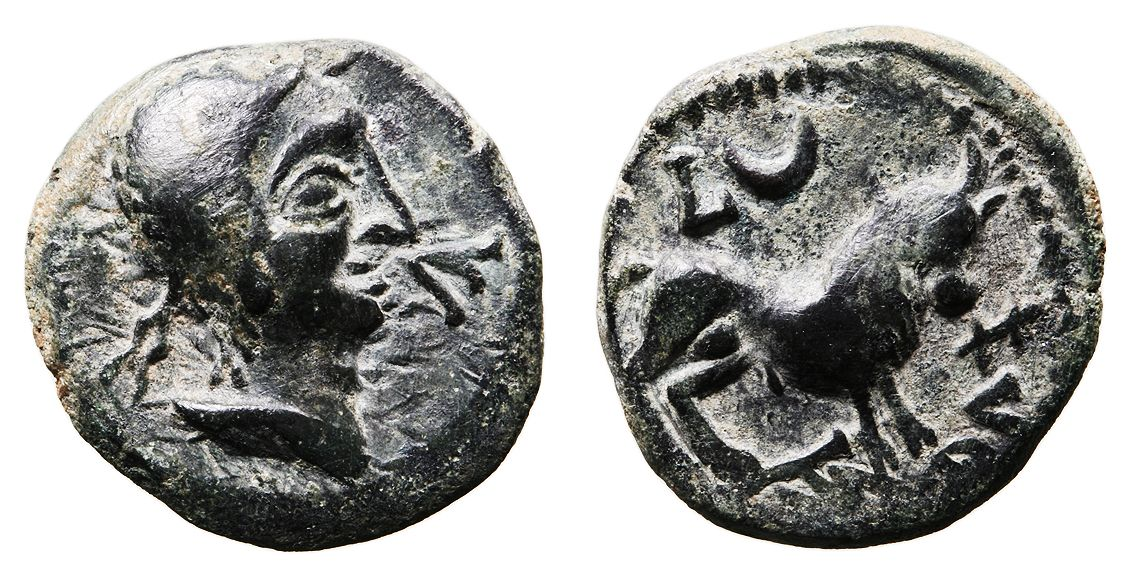
Bronze 'Iberian' semis of KASTILO (Linares)

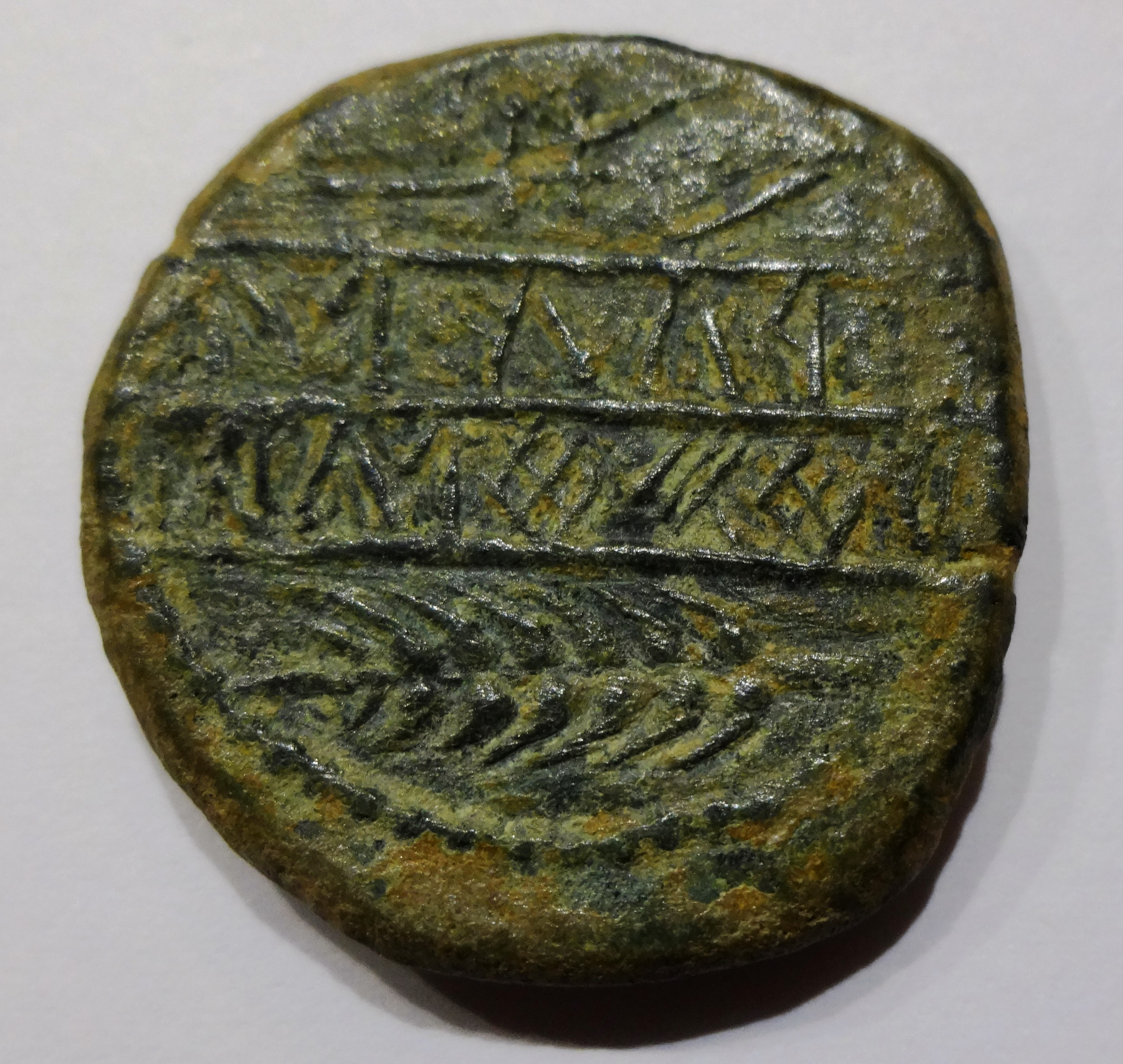
Bronze 'Iberian' aes of IBOLKA (Porcuna)

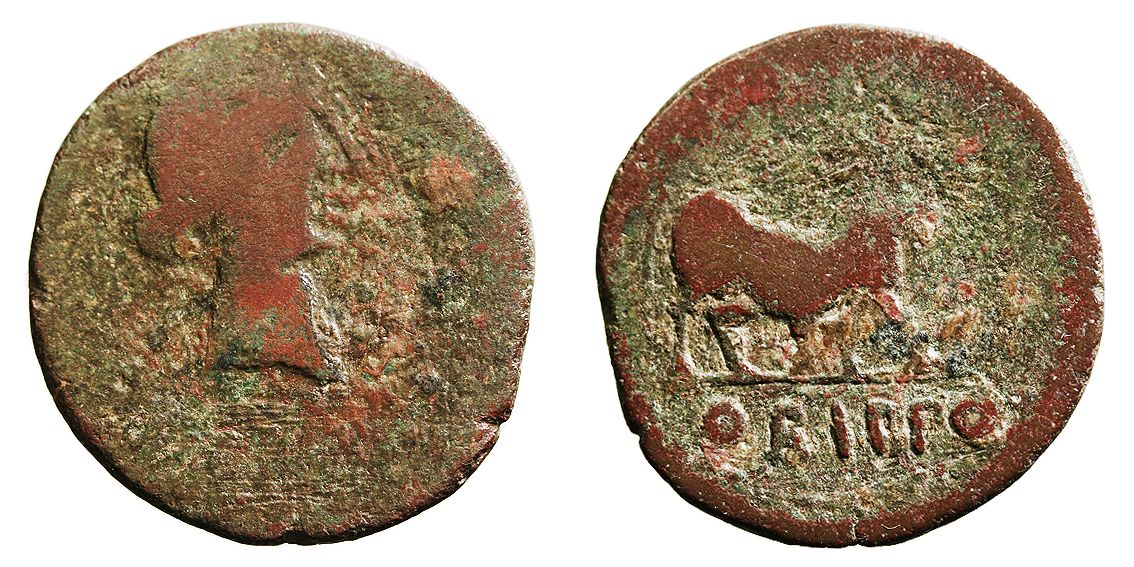
Bronze aes of Orippo (Torre de los Herberos, Seville), 1st century BC

Coins of Hispania, mid 1st century BC to mid 1st century AD

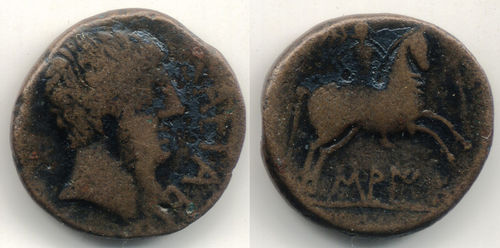
Bronze bilingual aes of SAITI-Saetabis (Xàtiva), mid-1st century BC

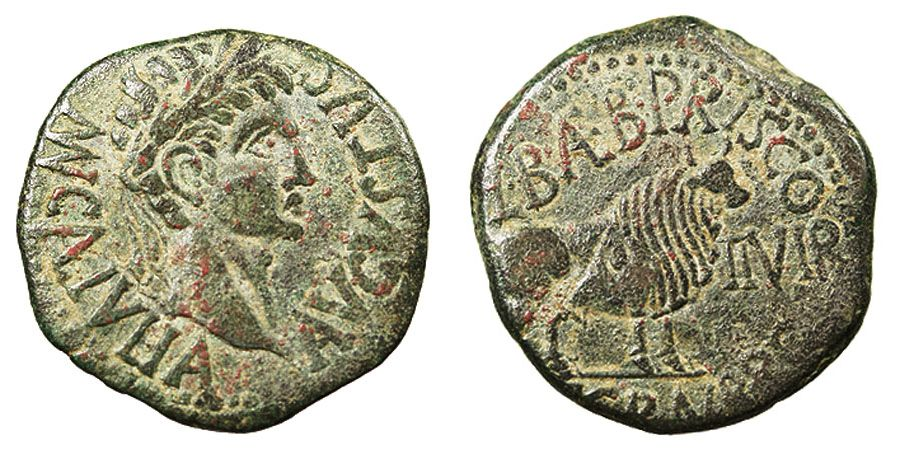
Bronze 'Provincial' aes of Calagurris (Calahorra), Julio-Claudian

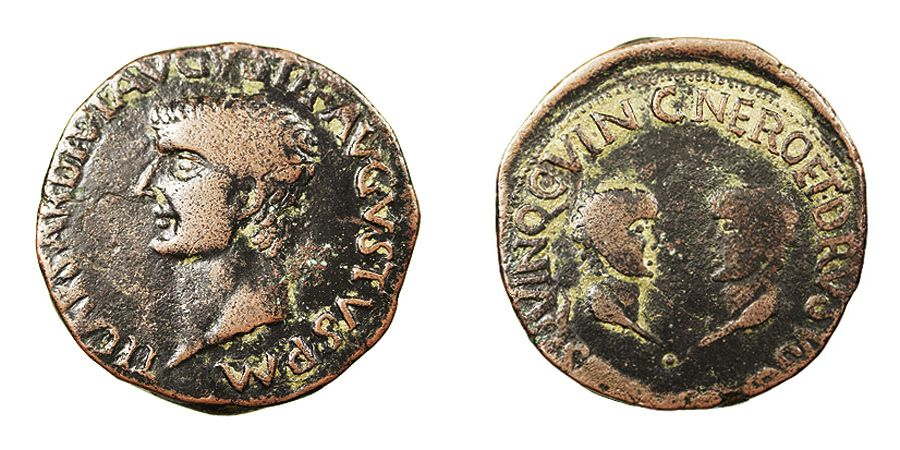
Bronze 'Provincial' aes of Carthago Nova (Cartagena), reign of Tiberius

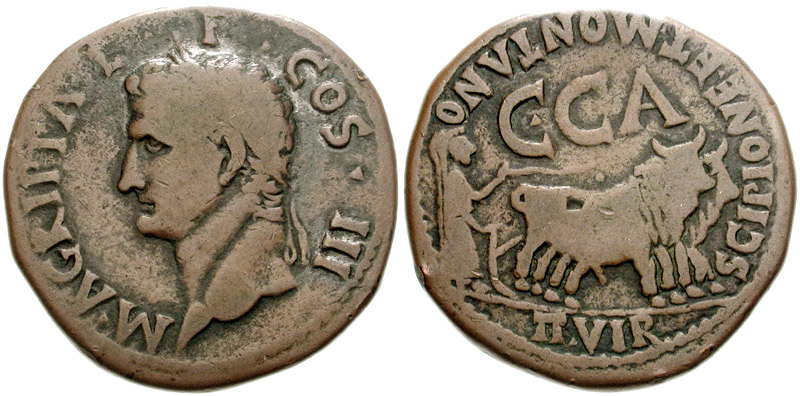
Bronze 'Provincial' aes of Caesaraugusta (Zaragoza), reign of Caligula

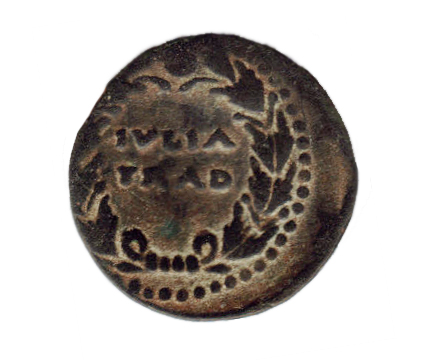
Bronze aes of Iulia Traducta (Algeciras), reign of Augustus

== See also ==
- Roman Republican currency
- Roman currency
- Roman provincial coins
- Iberians
- Carthaginian currency
- Ancient Greek coinage
