= Casa Tait =

Tait House
- Casa Tait
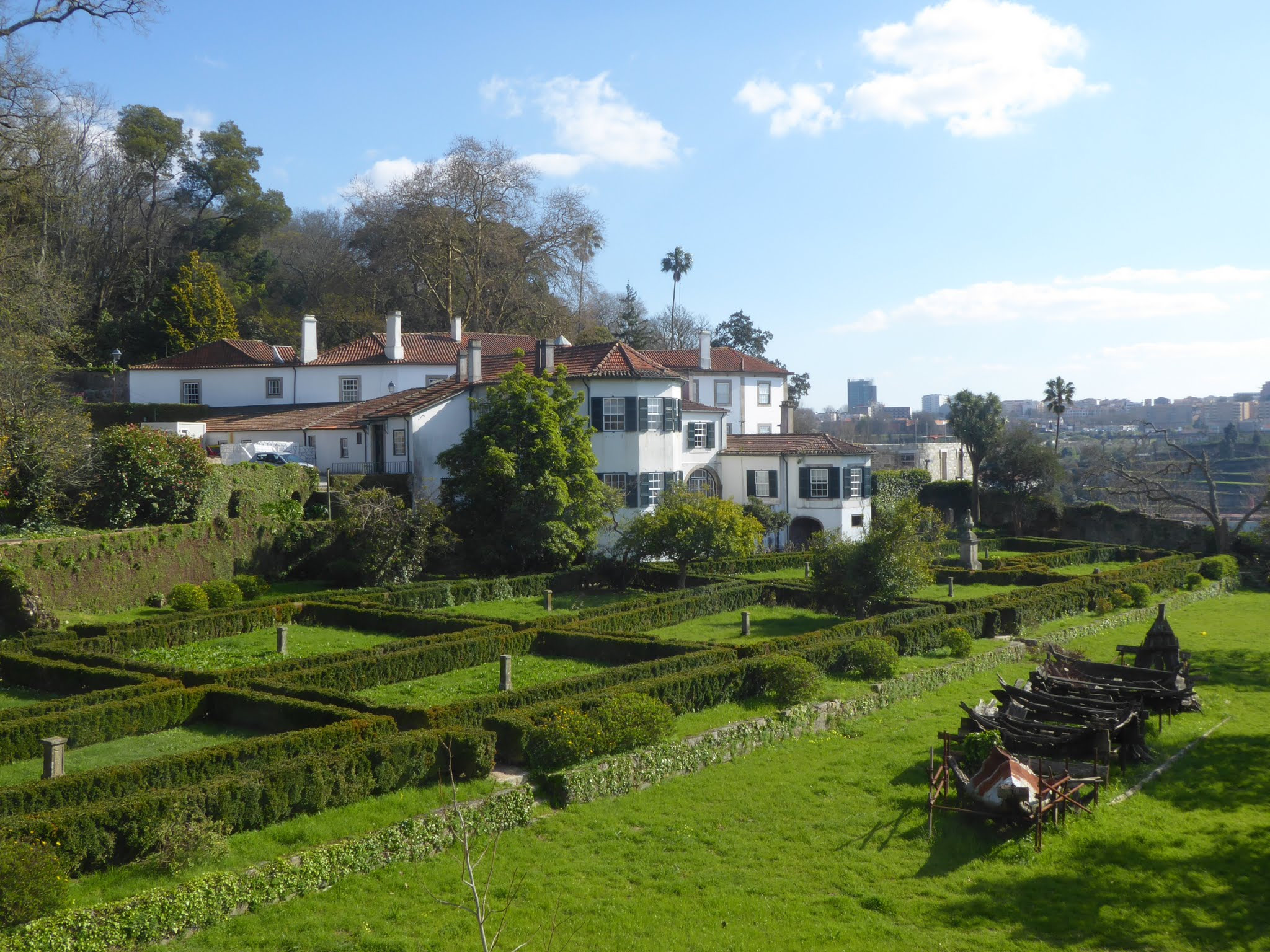
- Interactive map of the Tait House area
- Alternative names: Quinta do Meio

General information
- Type: Residence
- Location: Lordelo do Ouro e Massarelos, Rua de Entre Quintas, 219, Porto, Portugal
- Coordinates: 41°8′52″N 8°37′43″W
- Opened: 18th century
- Owner: Câmara Municipal do Porto

Website
- https://museudoporto.pt/en/

The Tait House (Portuguese: Casa Tait), also known as Quinta do Meio, is a former 18th century residence in Massarelos, Porto, near the Quinta da Macieirinha (now the Romantic Museum of Porto) and the gardens of the Crystal Palace (Palácio de Cristal). It is in an isolated location, protected by high walls, overlooking the Douro River, and offering privileged views of the surrounding landscape. The estate is renowned for its historic gardens, which feature several protected trees, including a 250-year-old tulip tree (Liriodendron tulipifera) classified as a tree of public interest. Today it hosts the programming department (Núcleo de Programação) of Porto's museum.

== History ==
Since the 17th century, the area of Massarelos, at the time on the outskirts of Porto, was highly sought after by merchants, especially foreigners, for the purchase of land for recreational estates. During the 19th century, several families resided in the house, and for a period it was run by Reverend Edward Whitely as a school for boys.

In 1880, William Tait moved to the property, later acquiring it on 22 April 1900. Tait was a wealthy Port wine merchant and a naturalist who introduced various plants to Portugal. He contributed to ornithology research in Portugal, authoring papers such as The Birds of Portugal in 1924 and A List of the Birds of Portugal in 1887. Upon his death in 1925, Muriel Tait inherited the property, living there until her death in 1978. The property was then transferred to the Porto City Council, fulfilling her intention to turn it into a public green space.

Between 1988 and 2008, the building housed the Numismatics Cabinet, before it moved to Palacete of the Visconts of Balsemão.

In July 2024, renovation works began on Casa Tait, focusing on the restoration of its facades and roof to address structural issues and ensure better conservation of the building. This project was valued at €177,000 and was expected to be completed by January 2025.

== Architecture and gardens ==
Casa Tait reflects the typology of "Quintas de Recreio" (recreational estates), which were common in the period. The estate is enclosed by high walls and retains a distinctly English character, evidenced by the intimate design of its spaces and its plant species. Two main structures are located within the property: the principal house and the Casa-Barracão. The main house, positioned alongside the narrow Rua de Entre Quintas, lacks windows on the street-facing side. The original main entrance was located here, though the house primarily opens to the garden, providing sweeping views toward the mouth of the Douro River. The Casa-Barracão, situated near the estate's current entrance, was constructed in 1917. William Tait designed this building to include a garage for his automobiles and accessories, a room for his chauffeur, storage spaces for firewood and gardening tools, a smokehouse, and a small chicken coop.

The gardens of Casa Tait are celebrated for their collections of roses and camellias, as well as their rich arboreal heritage. Notable features include a monumental tulip tree (Liriodendron tulipifera) over 250 years old, classified as a tree of public interest in 1950, a large-flowered magnolia (Magnolia grandiflora), and a younger tulip tree, both classified in 2021. The gardens also include a wooded area with 60 different camellia trees.
