= Via Augusta =

Roman road in ancient Hispania

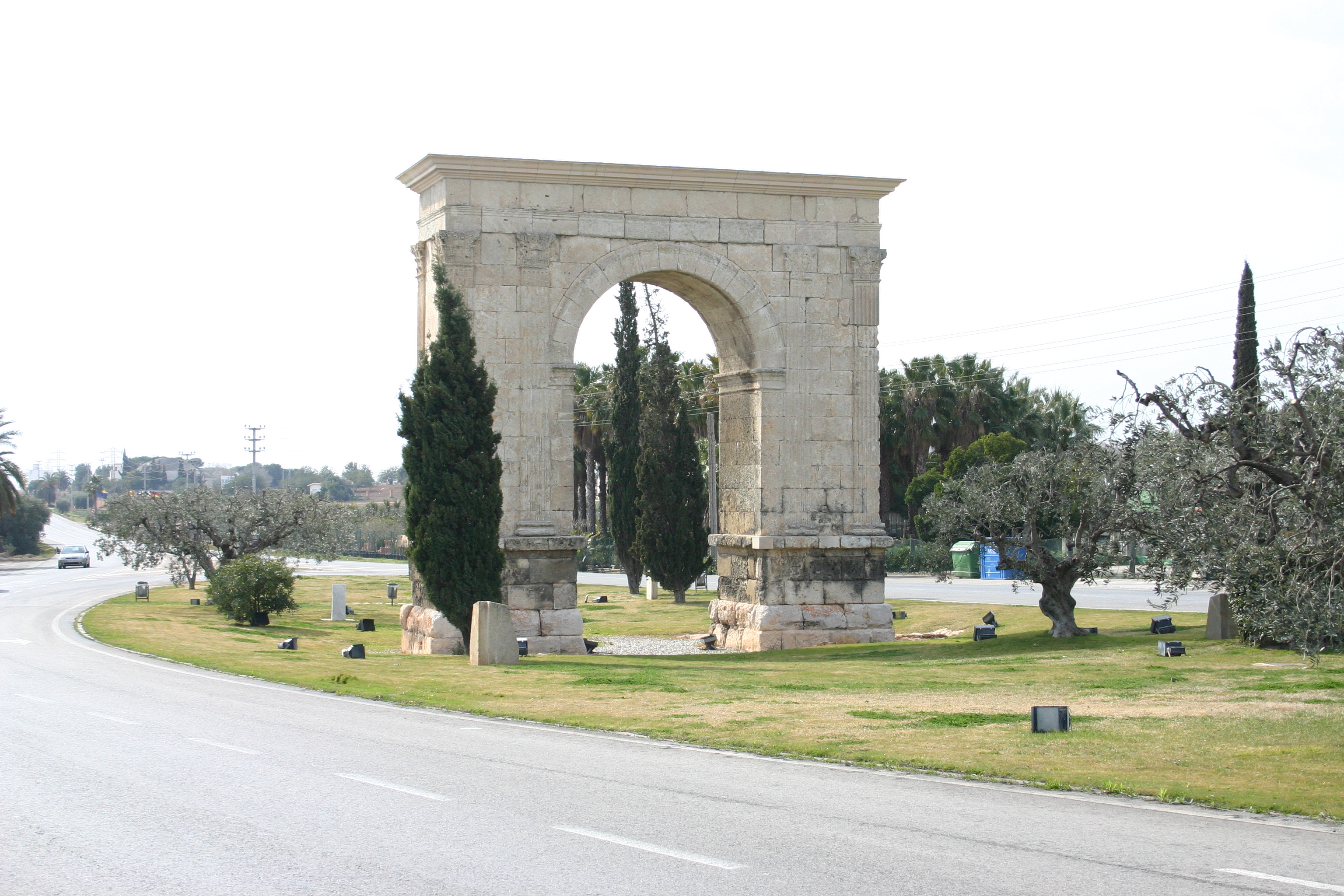
- The Arch of Berà on the Via Augusta

- Type: Roman road
- Periods: 8 BC – 2 BC
- Location: Roman province of Hispania (Spain, southern France) from Gades (Cádiz) to Pertusium (Coll de Pertús) in the Pyrenees

History
- Built by: Roman Empire, Augustus Caesar

The Via Augusta (also known as the Via Herculea or Via Exterior) was the longest and busiest of the major roads built by the Romans in ancient Hispania (the Iberian Peninsula). According to historian Pierre Sillières, who has supervised excavation of Roman sites in Spain to identify the exact route followed by the Via Augusta, it was more a system of roads than a single road. Approximately 1,500 km (930 mi) long, the Via Augusta was built to link Spain with Italy, running from the southwestern coastal city of Gades (Cádiz) to the Pyrenees Mountains along inland valleys parallel to the coast of the Mediterranean Sea. As the main axis of the road network in Roman Hispania, it appears in ancient sources such as the itinerary inscribed on the Vicarello Cups as well in as the Antonine Itinerary.

The highway was named after the emperor Augustus, who ordered reconstruction of the previously existing Via Herculea (or Via Heraklea), which ran from the Pyrenees to Carthago Nova, and extension of the arterial roadway as far as Gades. The works were carried out between 8 BC and 2 BC, taking advantage of what remained of roads that had existed in the time of the Roman Republic. Subsequently, it became an important communications and trade route between the cities and provinces and the ports of the Mediterranean. The Via Augusta was still used by the Moors of southern Spain in the 10th century, who called it al-Racif. Its route is currently followed by the N-340 road and the A-7 highway. North of Tarragona there remains a Roman Triumphal arch, the Arc de Berà, around which the road divides. At Martorell, the ancient Via crosses the river Llobregat on the Pont del Diable, which dates from the High Middle Ages (circa 1289) in its current form. At present, the N-IV N-420, N-340 and the Mediterranean Highway ( A-7, AP-7, A-70 ) follow the same itinerary in many sections as the Vía Augusta. In some sections of the current N-340, the Roman road was used until the 1920s, when they were paved during the dictatorship of Primo de Rivera.

== Background information ==
The Roman Empire built roads extending to its far corners; once the Romans had conquered Hispania they began to build roads there as in their other territories. Hispania, the Roman name for the Iberian Peninsula, included what is now Spain, Portugal, Andorra, and the southernmost part of France. When Augustus went to Spain between 16 and 13 BC, he saw the need for roads and ordered the construction of the Via Augusta, the longest and most important road in Hispania. The road passed from near the southern tip of present-day Spain on the Atlantic to the Mediterranean through the Guadalquivir valley and along the coast to the Coll de Pertús (Latin: "Pertusium") pass in the Pyrenees.

The Via Augusta linked Hispania Baetica in the south with the north of Hispania. The still extant Alcantarilla bridge, a double arched stone bridge over the River Salado in Utrera, about 32 kilometres (20 mi) south of Seville, has an inscription on the cutwater of one of its pilings indicating that it was on the Via Augusta. The Romans built a fifteen-arched bridge over the River Baetis (the Guadalquivir) at Andújar on the Augustan road. In the second half of the 1st century, with the social stability brought by the Pax Romana, the Roman city of Carmo, now Carmona, became a major crossroads on the Via Augusta and an important outpost in the Roman empire.

Several cities have traces of the roadbed, which roughly follows that of the current AP-7 motorway. There is a fairly long visible stretch in the municipality of El Perelló, in the province of Tarragona. The Arc de Berà is located on the section that passed just south of the city. The strategic position of Roman Barcelona (Barcino) on a spur road of the Via Augusta allowed the city's commercial and economic development. In Barcelona, the ancient Via Augusta corresponds to one of the main avenues, also called "Via Augusta", in the Sarrià-Sant Gervasi district, which connects the Avinguda Diagonal with the Vallvidrera tunnels, passing through Plaça Molina. A large part of line 6 of the Generalitat of Catalonia Railways passes underneath the Via Augusta roadbed.

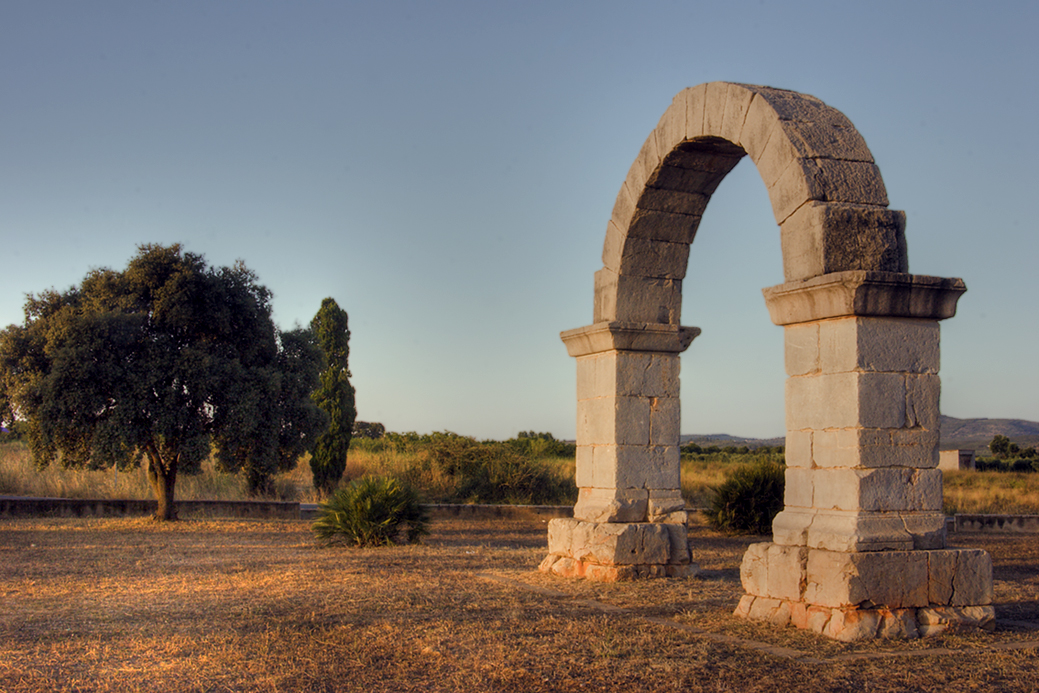
Arch of Cabanes

The Roman Arch of Cabanes, in the flat area known as Pla de l'arc, 19 kilometres (12 mi) northwest of Castellón in the Valencian Country, crosses the Via Augusta, which followed the inland valley in the province. This arch is now located in a roundabout of the CV-157 that still retains a certain resemblance to the appearance of the ancient Roman roads due to the rows of trees lining both sides of the highway, although the original route of the Via Augusta, which today is marked in many regions as a livestock route, does not always coincide with the current roads. However, the CV-157 road does not follow the southwest–northeast orientation that the Via Augusta followed in almost all its route, but rather west–east. This is because, as in other regions of Spain (e.g., Barcelona, Cabanes, and Tarragona), the Via Augusta crossed sparsely populated areas, generally along interior valleys parallel to the coast, so that almost all the Roman cities, especially those on the coast, were reached by secondary roads perpendicular to the Via Augusta. Branches used for military purposes also ran to the interior.

The Via Augusta is documented and referenced in two central places in Valencia: the first is next to the Valencia Cathedral in the Almoina Archaeological Centre, which houses archaeological excavations made between 1985 and 2005 that revealed stratigraphic layers representing successive eras of the city's history, and the second place is next to the old Palace of the Borgias, now the Valencian Parliament. A few tens of metres of the pavement of the road can be found in the Almoina Museum, as well as remains of six Corinthian Order columns of the Temple of the Nymphs (Templo de las Ninfas) from the same period, a stone well, and remains of Visigothic and Arab houses. There are also milestones in San Vicente street (the city exit to the south) and in the Alameda de Valencia (the city esplanade).

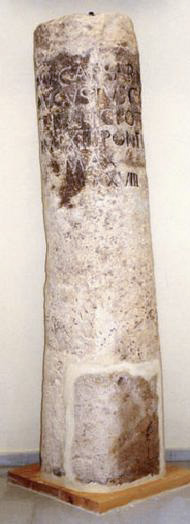
The San Vicente Ferrer Column of Caesar Augustus

The city of Lorca (known as Eliocroca in Roman times) in the province of Murcia has several vestiges of the Via Augusta, including two Roman columns, the San Vicente Ferrer and the Baldazos milestones (La Hoya), respectively, of Emperor Augustus (8–7 BC) and Emperor Constantius Chlorus, preserved in the Archaeological Museum of Lorca (Museo Arqueológico de Lorca). The milestone of Constantius Chlorus was found in 1929 at Baldazos, in the Diputación of La Hoya, six km from Lorca. During Roman times this hamlet was a mansio, or official stopping place. Another milestone, the El Hornillo milestone, was found by a citizen on 5 February 2013 in the course of the River Guadalentín, upstream from Lorca; Like the San Vicente Ferrer column, this column dates to the reign of Caesar Augustus; it is currently on display in the vestibule of the Museo Arqueológico de Lorca (MUAL).

The Column of San Vicente Ferrer, dating to the reign of Caesar Augustus (CIL II 4937) is inscribed:

IMP. Caesar. DIVI. F. / AVGVSTUS. CONS. XI / TRIBVNIC. POTEST. XVI / IMP. XIIII. PONTIFEX. / MAX / M. P. XXVIII.

This is the abbreviated form of:

IMPERATOR CAESAR DIVI FILIVS / AGVSTVS CONSVL XI / TRIBVNICIA POTESTATE XVI / IMPERATOR XIIII PONTIFEX. / MAXIMVS / MILLE PASSVS XXVIII

The inscription translated to English reads:

Emperor Caesar Augustus, son of the Divine, Consul for the 11th time, his 16th year of tribunal power, General in 14 campaigns and Chief High Priest, mile 28 [from Carthago Nova (Cartagena) towards Eliocroca (Lorca}]

== History ==
The Via Augusta was the great imperial road of Spain, and as a continuation of the Vias Julia Augusta, Aemilia, and Flaminia, it formed a major link in a chain of roads connecting Rome with the Atlantic Ocean. Its usage allowed the development of cities such as Valentia (Valencia), Saguntum (Sagunto), Lucentum (Alicante), Saetabis (Xàtiva), and Ilici (Elche). The Roman road engineers naturally considered the surrounding environment and the slope of the land when determining the course of the road, taking into account the existing old Iberian roads as well. The average width was between four and six metres, although there are some sections that were ten or fourteen metres wide. The sidewalks (margines or crepidines), built only near the cities, were between three and ten metres wide on each side.

Starting from Coll de Pertús pass in the Pyrenees, the Via Augusta ran south and southwest to the upper reaches of the River Baetis, and from that area on through Baetica to Gades. From the point where the road crossed the Baetis, however, a new system began. The river in that region formed the boundary between Baetica and Tarraconensis, and there a bridge with an arch, the Ianus Augusti, was erected in honor of Augustus. From this arch all the rest of the milestones on the way to Gades were numbered. Only the opus caementicium foundations of the arch remain extant. It is located in the northeastern sector of the Guadalquivir Basin, a foreland basin situated between the Iberian Massif to the north and the Betic Cordillera to the south.

Milestones were placed on the edge of Roman roads to indicate distances between capitas (starting points), at a distance of a thousand paces between the milestones (a pace was a Roman double step called a mille passum) equivalent to a Roman mile, i.e., 1.480 metres, hence its name. The milestones were cylindrical stone columns of granite or sandstone between 2 and 3 metres high and 50 to 80 cm in diameter, set on a square base. They were inscribed with information referring to the road: the name of the builder or restorer, the name of the nearest station and the distance, and sometimes the point of departure (caput viae) or of arrival (terminus viae).

=== Construction of the road network ===
Administrative divisions of Hispania in 17 BC with the capital of each province and of each conventus

The construction of the Via Augusta was undertaken within the context of the administrative reorganisation of the provinces of Hispania initiated by Augustus. The immediate precedent of this roadbuilding project was the network of roads, the Via Agrippa, built in Gaul under the supervision of Marcus Vipsanius Agrippa at Augustus' command in 20-19 BC. Strabo (IV, 6, 11) alludes to Agrippa's laying out of the roadways. Agrippa then went to Hispania in 19-18 BC to personally direct the war against the Cantabrians in the north of the peninsula; Augustus himself returned to Hispania and remained for a period between 16 and 13 BC doing administrative work. He and his advisors set about devising an ambitious programme to restructure the administration of the territory, its primary objectives being the establishment of new cities, the construction of roads connecting them, and the distribution of large areas of land to be parcelled out among veteran professional soldiers.

With the complete subjugation of Hispania, Augustus determined to lay out a proper road system like that which Agrippa had built in Gaul, and the basic network appears to have been completed in his reign. He repaired and relaid the coastal road from Tarraco (the imperial headquarters during his residence, Augustus made it the capital of Hispania Tarraconensis), through Valentia to Carthago Nova (Cartagena), as well as the road through the Baetis valley by way of Corduba and Hispalis to Gades itself, and in this section a large number of milestones bearing his name have been found.

The isolation of Hispania from the rest of the Mediterranean world was a circumstance addressed by the building of Augustus' road network. The itineraries and milestones, as well as traces of the ancient roads, suggest that this was an intensive project. There were four important routes between the conventus capitals of Bracara Augusta (Braga) and Asturica Augusta (Astorga), the third hub of the system being the conventus capital Lucus Augusti (Lugo). Caesaraugusta (Zaragoza) and Carthago Nova were conventus capital cities that were also crossroads and the terminuses (capita) of roads.

Augustus ordered the building of the road from Caesaraugusta to Tarragona, passing through Ilerda (Lerida) and Huesca. Domitian extended the road from Caesaraugusta to Olispo (Lisbon), by way of Toletum (Toledo) and Augusta Emerita. The latter city was the starting point of the road (later the so-called "silver way"), which passed northward through Salamanca to Oceloduri. There it met the road following the course of the Ebro and then into the region of north-central Hispania. Asturica Augusta, the terminus of the "silver route", was an important junction, where the highways to Lusitania and the Cantabrian coast intersected. It later became the celebrated pilgrimage road to Santiago de Compostela. In the south, Emerita and Gades were connected by the Hispalis road. In Hispalis the road joined the branch of the Via Augusta which started in Acci (also Accitum) and veered inland to Corduba, Astigi (Écija), and Carmo. This was the main layout of the Roman road system in Hispania; together with the network of localised roads, they covered about 21,000 km (13,000 mi).

Milestones indicate the roads laid out by Augustus from Bracara to Asturica through Lucus Augusti, from Caesaraugusta to Juliobriga (Reinosa), from Emerita (Mérida) to Hispalis (Seville), penetrating the rich mining district of the Montes Mariani, and from Carthago Nova to Castulo (Cazorla), another mining region. There was a road built by him from Ilerda to Caesaraugusta, crossing the Ebro by a wooden bridge according to Strabo, and apparently one from Aesuris to Pax Julia, up the course of the river Anas. Augustus had surrounded Hispania with a great circle of roads, with one or two branches reaching inland. In contrast to Gaul, where Agrippa had laid out four or five roads radiating from a central hub, here there was the perimeter of a wheel, so to speak, and it was the task of succeeding emperors to fill in the spokes and build more direct cross-country routes.

The Via Augusta was originally a via militaris, i.e., a military road built by legionaries of the Roman army; these units constructed a substantial part of the road network, especially at the beginning of the empire. These roads remained strategically important, but their main purpose was for general communications, as shown by an inscription on a fragmentary milestone found near Corduba (Córdoba). Here, in the year 90, Domitian ordered the restoration of the Via Augusta, which had fallen into disrepair. This section of the road was designated a via miltaris, according to the inscription:

VIAM AVGVSTAM MILITAREM / VETVSTATE CORRVPTAM RESTITVIT.

In English:

He restored the via militaris Augusta, which had become dilapidated through old age.

== Cities through which the Via Augusta passed ==
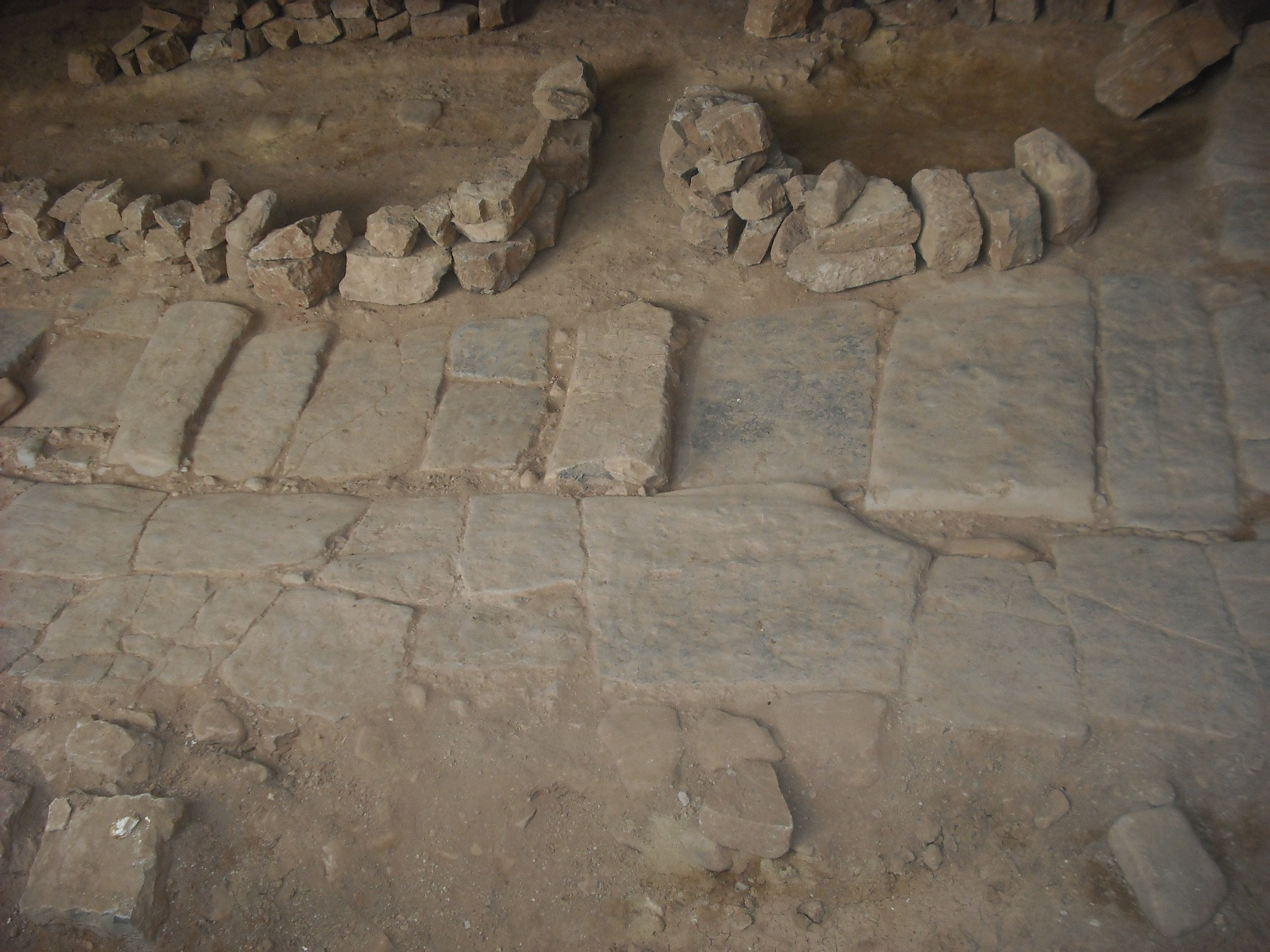
Traces of the road in ancient Gades (Cádiz)

- Gades (Cádiz)
- Ad Portus (El Puerto de Santa María)
- Asta Regia (Jerez de la Frontera (Mesas de Asta))
- Ugia (Torre Alocaz), Utrera
- Orippo (Dos Hermanas)
- Hispalis (Seville)
- Carmona (Carmona)
- Obucla u Obúlcula (Fuentes de Andalucía (La Monclova))
- Colonia Augusta Firma Astigi (Écija)
- Adaras (La Carlota)
- Corduba (Córdoba)
- Iliturgi (Mengíbar, where it crossed the Betis River on the Bridge of Andújar (Guadalquivir)
- Isturgi (Andújar)
- Castulo (Linares)
- Mentesa Oretana (Villanueva de la Fuente)
- Saltigi (Chinchilla de Monte-Aragón)
- Libisosa (Lezuza)
- Ad Ello (Elda)
- Carthago Nova (Cartagena)
- Eliocroca (Lorca)
- Sucro (Albalat de la Ribera)
- Saetabis (Xàtiva)
- Valentia (Valencia)
- Saguntum (Sagunt)
- Intybilis (La Jana)
- Dertosa (Tortosa)
- Tarraco (Tarragona)
- Barcino (Barcelona)
- Baetulo (Badalona)
- Aquis Vocontis (Caldes de Malavella)
- Gerunda (Girona)
- Narbo Martius (Narbonne), France
