= Orippo =

Former Roman town in Hispania Baetica, near modern-day Dos Hermanas, Spain

- Location within Spain
- 37°16′26″N 6°00′16″W
- Type: Settlement
- Periods: Roman Republic; Roman Empire
- Cultures: Turdetanian; Roman
- Region: Hispania

Orippo was a Roman town of Hispania Baetica, on the road from Gades to Hispalis.

== History ==
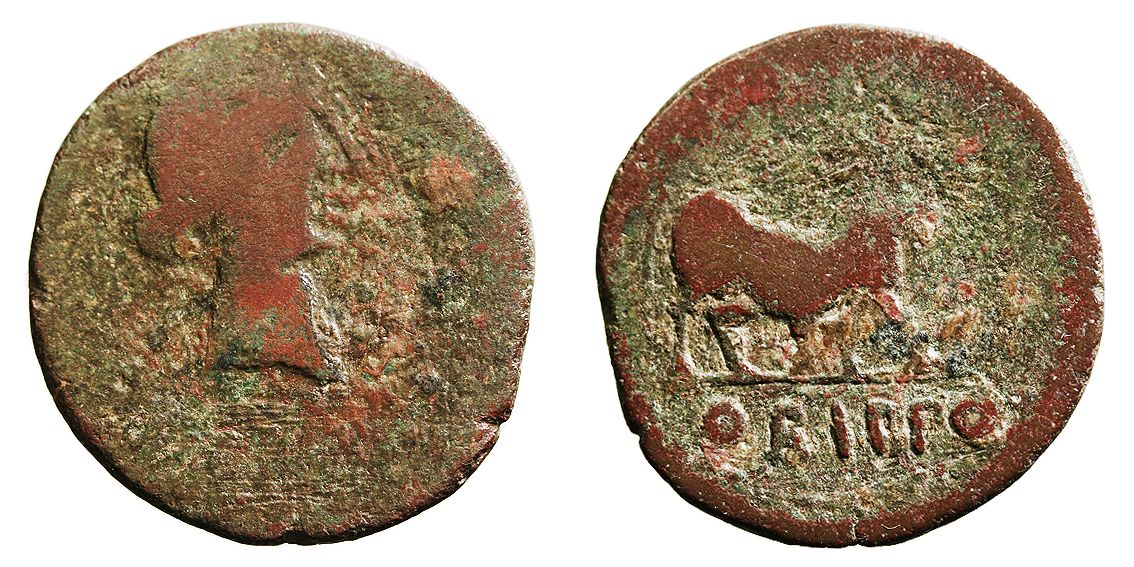
Bronze as, issued at Orippo

Orippo is commonly identified with Villa de dos Hermaños, though some have mentioned Alcala de Guadaira and Torre de los Herberos.

Ancient coins of the place often have a bunch of grapes, showing that the neighbourhood was rich in wines, a character which it still preserves.

== See also ==
- Via Augusta
- Ancient Iberian coinage
- Archeological Museum of Seville

== Sources ==
=== Primary ===
- Bostock, John; Riley, H. T. (1855). The Natural History of Pliny. Vol. 1. London: Henry G. Bohn. p. 160.

=== Secondary ===
- Dyer, Thomas H. (1857). "Orippo". In Smith, William (ed.). Dictionary of Greek and Roman Geography. Vol. 2: Iabadius–Zymethus. London: Walton and Maberly. p. 493.
