= Casa do Infante =

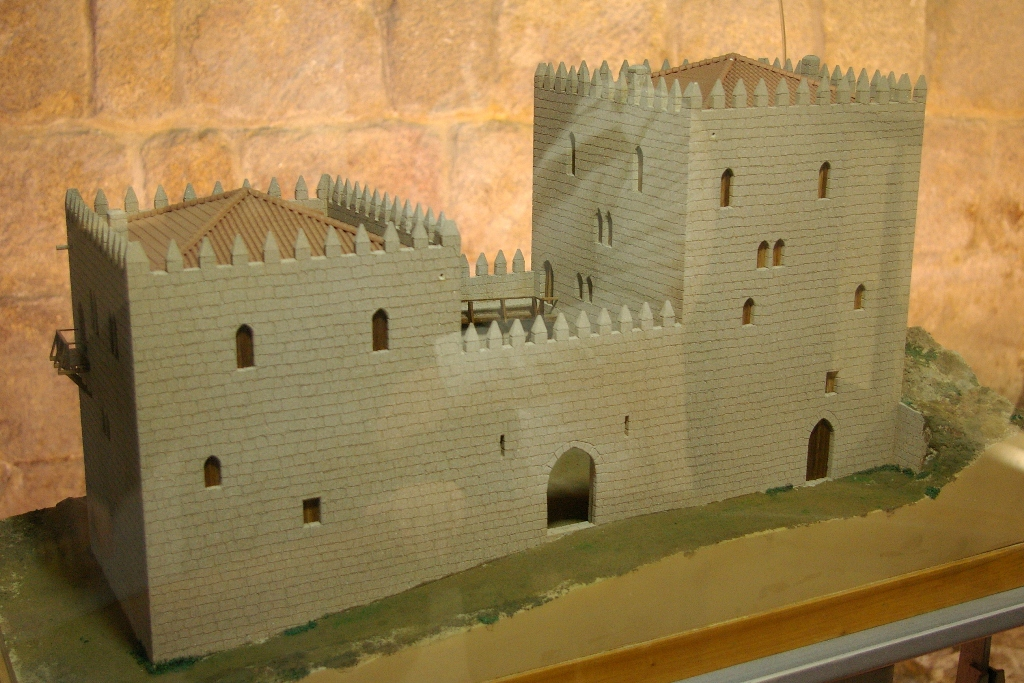
- A maquette of the old customshouse of the medieval kingdom
- Interactive map of the Casa do Infante area

General information
- Type: Residence
- Location: Cedofeita, Santo Ildefonso, Sé, Miragaia, São Nicolau e Vitória, Portugal
- Coordinates: 41°8′26.9″N 8°36′52.2″W
- Owner: Câmara Municipal do Porto

Technical details
- Material: Granite

Design and construction
- Architect: João Eanes Melacho

The Casa do Infante (House of the Prince), or alternately as the Alfândega Velha (Old Customshouse), is a historical house in the civil parish of Cedofeita, Santo Ildefonso, Sé, Miragaia, São Nicolau e Vitória, in the municipality of Porto, in northern Portugal.

The house was originally built in the 14th century as customs and mint, although its present condition derives mostly from a remodelling carried out in the 17th century. Its name derived from an oral tradition that suggested the house was the birthplace of Prince Henry the Navigator in 1394. The Casa do Infante is located in the historical centre of Porto, designated World Heritage Site by UNESCO

== History ==
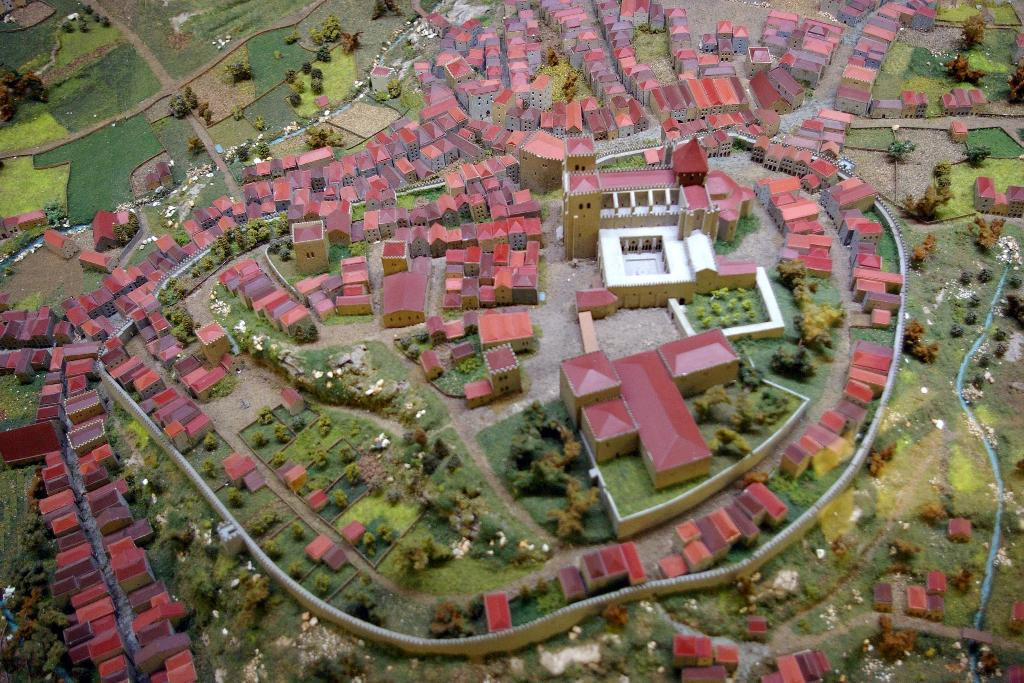
A diorama of the medieval village of Porto with Sé Cathedral and Casa do Infante

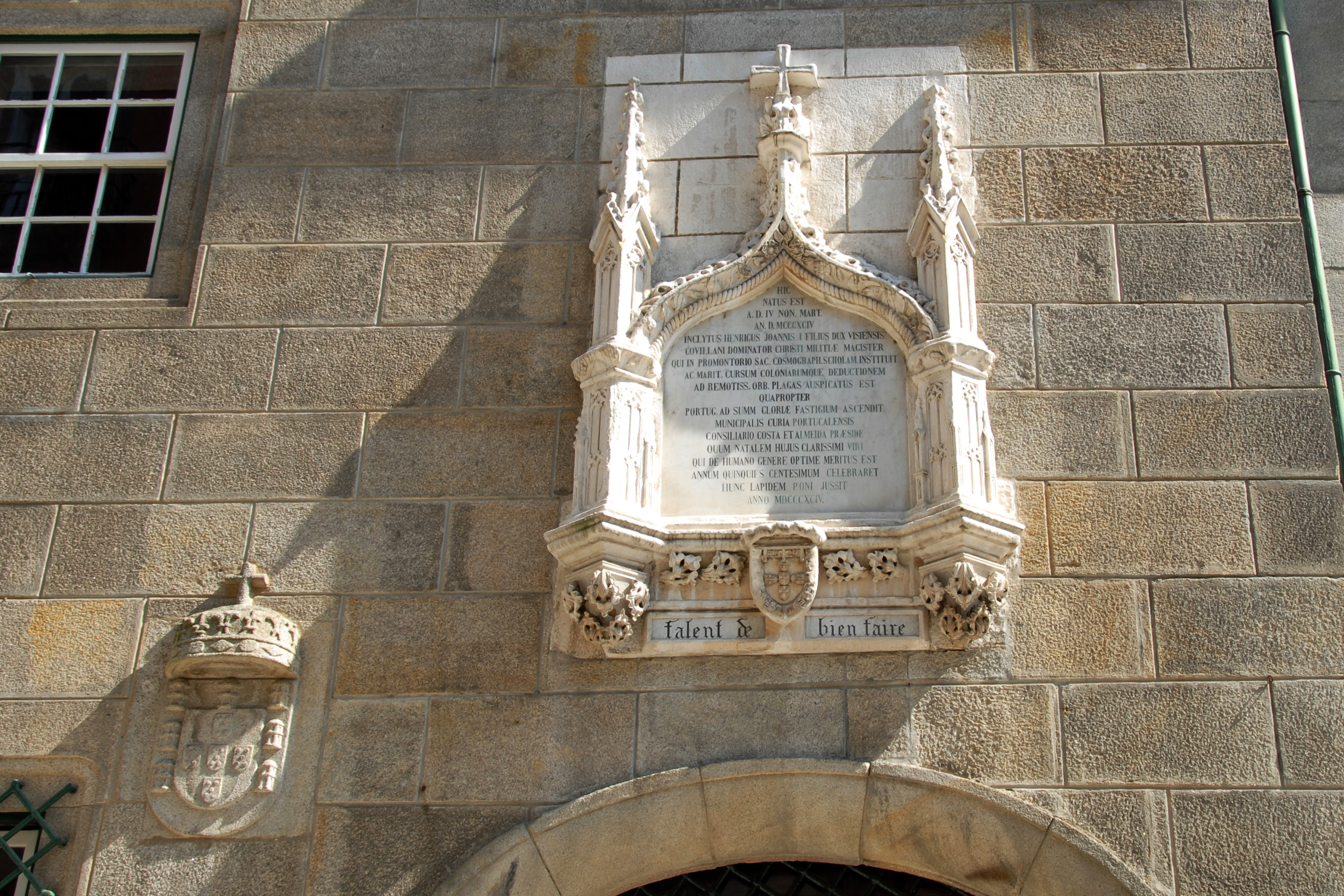
The Neo-manueline plaque marking the birthplace of the Infante D. Henrique, later referred to as Henry the Navigator

The customshouse was constructed in 1325 by royal decree on top of a Roman villa.

References to the Casas da Alfândega (customshouses) in the next two years, suggest that it had already been completed and in use. The mediaeval customshouse began being built around 1354 in the reign of King D. Afonso IV (during the context of disputes between the himself and the Bishop of Porto. Afonso intended to charge taxes for goods carried by ships navigating the Douro river, thereby reducing the power of the bishop. Built near the river, the new Royal customshouse minted coin, acted as a warehouse and included living quarters for the employees. Archaeological excavations revealed that the building was large and had two, high towers linked by a courtyard.

Chronicler Fernão Lopes indicated that Infante D. Henrique was born to King D. John I and Queen Philippa in Porto on 4 March 1394. It is believed that, the future-Henry the Navigator (who would sponsor Portuguese expeditions during the Age of Discovery), would likely have been born here: the customshouse was the only royal building in the city and that it had living quarters for the royal employees, it is likely that the Cortes occupied the building at that time of his birth. This would confirm a long-held oral tradition.

At the end of the 14th century, was the first reference to the Portuense Casa da Moeda (House of Coin) during the reign of King D. Fernando I, that allowed dating of the open space in the principal entrance. In 1587, was the last reference to the work on the Casa da Moeda, but a few years later (1607), a royal letter extinguished the institution.

In 1628, there were new references to work in the old House of Coin.

The Finance inspector issued an order in 1656 to move the customshouse to the remnants of the House, and to promptly complete its reuse; starting in the 15th century, the customshouse underwent several expansions and re-modellings that altered its original structure. The most important remodelling occurred in 1677, under the reign of King D. Peter II, when the building was virtually rebuilt. The inner courtyard was kept, but the towers were greatly reduced in height, while the front of the building (facing the street) gained two extra storeys, with a large staircase leading to the living quarters in the second floor. The front of the building incorporated the functions of the towers and the storage rooms were greatly enlarged. A commemorative inscription, dated 1677, refers to this change:

SVB PRINCIPE PETRO / ANNO MDCLXXVII / POR DIRECÇÃO DO MARQVES DE FRONTEIRA / GENTILHOMEM DA CAMARA DE S.A. E SEV VEA/DOR DA FAZENDA
By Prince Peter / Year 16771688 / By direction of the Marquess of Fronteira / Gentleman of the Câmara of S.A. His Inspector of Finances

In 1860, the work and construction of the new customshouse in Miragaia, wherein the services were gradually transferred to the new site.

In 1894, a new Neo-Manueline plaque was installed on the principal entrance, commemorating the birth of the Infante D. Henrique.

The building was re-constructed in 1923, that saw the building obtain a new floor over the principal facade.

Between 1957 and 1978, the DGEMN Direção-Geral dos Edifícios e Monumentos Nacionais (General Directorate for Buildings and National Monuments) began a series of projects to recuperate and remodel the old customs house. Beginning with surveys and excavations, there were a series of works to restore and consolidate the structure. In 1960, upgrades to the electrical systems and the installation of new lighting highlighted further work on the reinforced concrete pavements. This included supply and placement of wood on the ceiling and halls of the central patio, concrete staircases, work on the windows, sanitation and drainage of the spaces, as well as complementary restoration of the walls, stone slabs and facades.

In 1991, the beginning of work to transform the house into the Arquivo Histórico Municipal do Porto (Porto Municipal Historical Archives), that included an initial phase of archaeological intervention (since 1995) under the responsibility of Manuel Luis Real (director of the AHMP) and archaeologists Paulo Dordio Gomes and Ricardo Teixeira. They discovered vestiges of a large Roman foundation, remains of a mosaic pavement. The second phase of the project, under the direction of Nuno Tasso de Sousa, to transform the interior and exterior to serve its needs: it now houses an exhibition of the history of Porto, including a scale model of medieval Porto, and the municipal archives supported by a dedicated library.

== Architecture ==
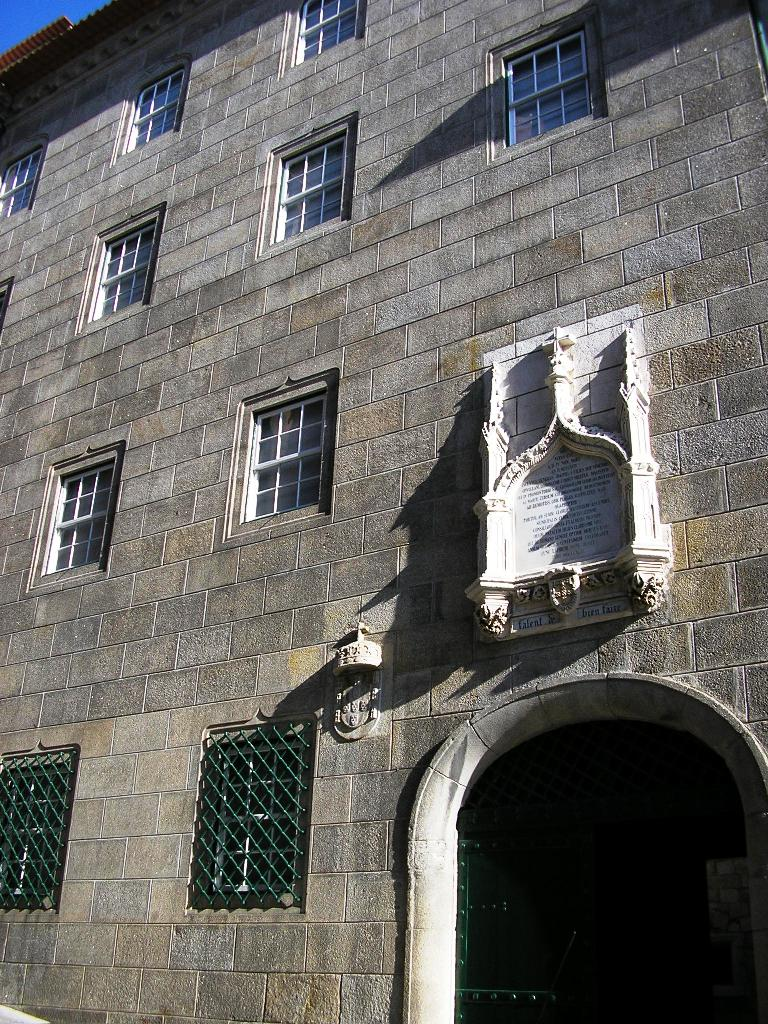
The front facade along the Praça do Infante D. Henrique

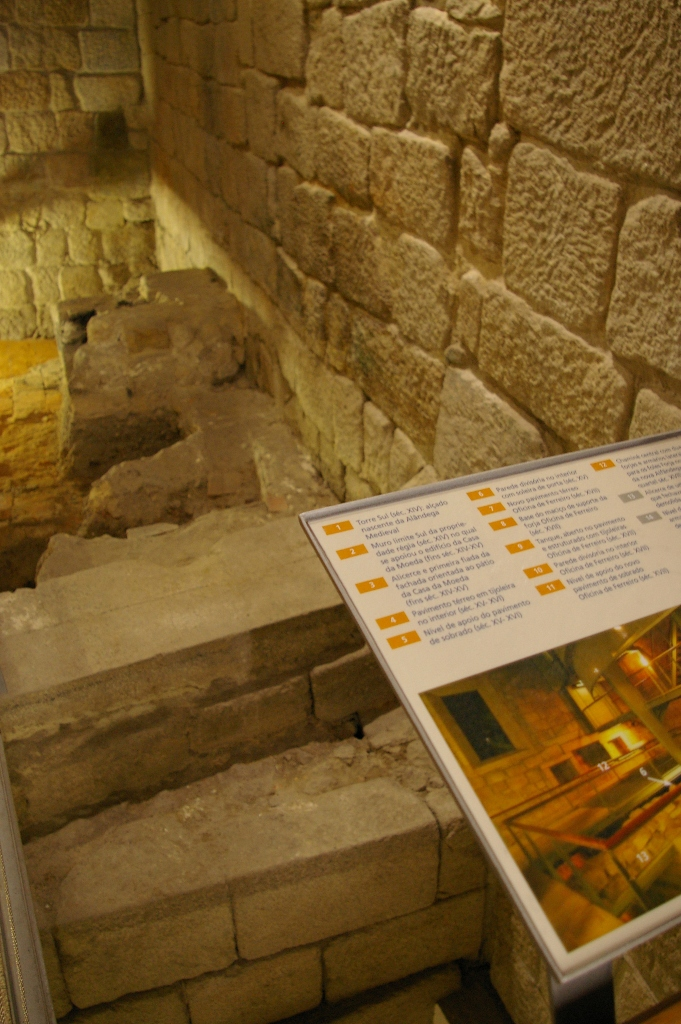
Portion of the Roman excavations within the "museum"

The Casa do Infante is addorsed to buildings in the historic centre of the city, along the riverbank, with its principal facade oriented to the inclined slope descending the Praça do Infante D. Henrique towards the Largo do Terreiro and access to the Cais da Estiva along the Douro.

The plan consist of four rectangular, juxtapositioned articulate spaces covered in differentiated of articulated ceiling tiles. The principal facade consists of four storeys covered in canopy windows. On the right-side of the first floor is a large arched doorway, surmounted by the royal coat-of-arms and a 1677 inscription, while the rear corps are uniformly lower. From the entrance is the access to a framed patio surmounted by archway framing the two upper floors, a large door that connects it to the rest of the buildings bodies, towards the east.

The first of these buildings is a large space of three naves defined by high arcade. Along its continuity, the buildings have two storeys accessible from the central nave by a staircase. In the rear facade are a series of high windows that illuminate the pavement and patio involving the eastern and northern buildings. From here are accessways to Rua Infante D. Henrique across a ramp and tunnel, that opens to an archway surmounted by royal coat-of-arms. Alongside the door exists a stone with the shield of the Avis dynastic family.

Archaeological excavations since 1995 identified a group of structures buried in the entirety of the property, allowing the reconstruction of the medieval organization of the customhouses and "House of Coin", with vestiges of an early Roman construction of grand dimensions, with polychromatic mosaics.
