= Visigothic coinage =

Middle Age coinage from Gaul and Hispania

Chindasuinth: tremissis
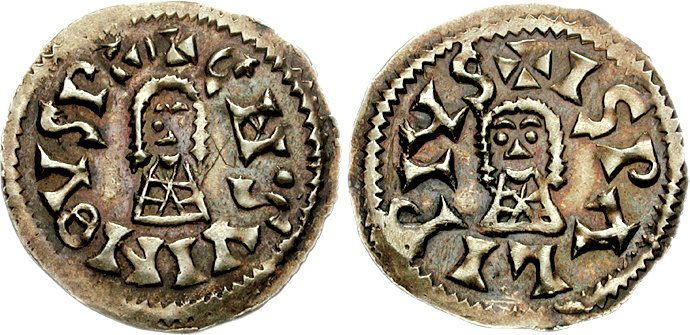
First side of the image: +CN•SVINLVS PX, facing bust
Second side of the image: +ISPALI PIVS, facing bust.
AV Tremissis (1.56 g, 6h). Hispalis (modern-day Seville) mint. MEC 255.

The coinage of the Visigoths was minted in Gaul and Hispania during the early Middle Ages, between the fifth century and approximately 710.

The principal denominations were the solidus and the tremissis, gold coins issued in the late imperial era by both Western and Eastern emperors. The earliest coinage is from Gaul, where the Visigoths settled at the beginning of the fifth century, and was followed by coinage from Hispania in the beginning of the sixth century, which became the centre of Visigothic rule after they lost the majority of their territory in Gaul to the Franks.

The first coins, commonly known as the pseudo-imperial series, imitate contemporary Roman and Byzantine coinage, with copied legends. After 580 coins were issued in the name of the Visigothic kings. This royal coinage continued until the second decade of the eighth century, when Visigothic rule was ended by the Islamic conquest of Iberia.

== Cataloging ==
The most recent work on the Visigothic coinage is the first volume of the series Medieval European Coinage (MEC), published by Philip Grierson and Mark Blackburn in 2007. Visigothic coins can be found between the catalogue numbers 166 and 277. Another important catalogue is George Carpenter's study, published in 1952 by the American Numismatic Society, which covers the period between 580 and 713.

The only study which covers the entirety of the coinage is that of Reinhart, with separate works on the Gallic and Hispanic series.

The pseudo-imperial coinage imitating Western archetypes is catalogued by Henry Cohen, in Description Historique des monnaies frappées sous l'Empire Romain, Vol. 8, and in Roman Imperial Coinage, Vol. 10. Imitations of Byzantine coins are covered by the catalogue of the collection of Dumbarton Oaks (DOC) and Moneta Imperii Byzantini (MIB).

== Historical context ==
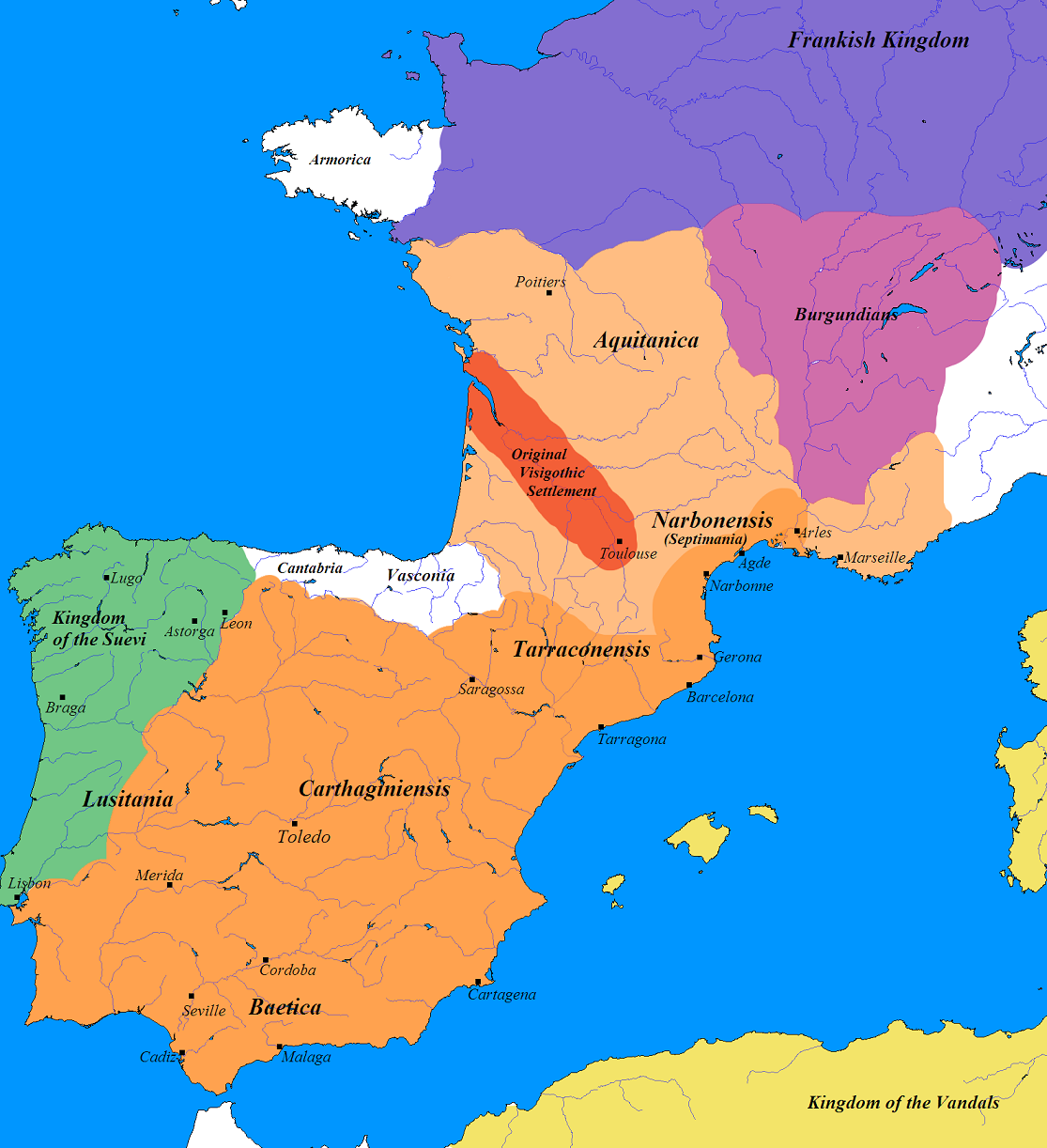
The Visigothic Kingdom under Alaric II (484-507, c. 500)

The history of the Visigoths can be divided into three important periods:

- a migratory period, which started in 376 and ended with the Visigothic settlement of south-west Gaul in 418.
- a Gallic period which ended in 507 with the battle of Vouillé, after which Clovis I, King of the Franks, conquered most of the Visigothic territories of Gaul.
- an Iberian period, which was ended by the Islamic conquest of the Iberian peninsula in 714.

The Visigoths migrated to the Western Roman Empire in the 370s and became significantly romanized. In 418 they were recognised as foederati, and were granted Aquitane by Honorius. This was the first centre of the Visigothic Kingdom, which over the course of the fifth century extended over the Pyrenees, including a significant portion of Hispania. In the first half of the seventh century, after the fall of the Kingdom of the Suebi (in c. 585) and the final abandonment of continental Spain by the Byzantine Empire, the Visigoths became sovereign rulers of most of the Iberian peninsula. The resulting state survived until the Islamic invasion of 711.

In the study of the coinage of the Visigoths a different periodisation is applied. The coinage of the migratory and Gallic periods are not distinguishable, both consisting of pseudo-Imperial issues. The third period coinage can be divided into two phases, the first which continues the imitation of Imperial coinage, and the latter in which the coins are issued in the names of the Visigothic Kings.

== Gallic coinage ==
Imitation of Honorius: siliqua
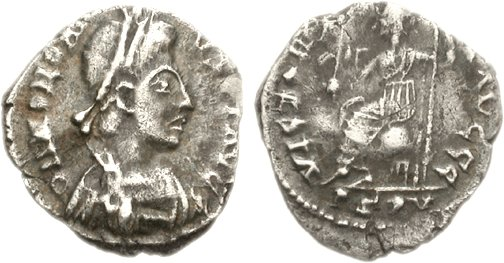
First side of the image: D N HONORI-VS [P F] AVG, bust of Honorius facing right, with pearl diadem, mantle, and armour.
Second side of the image: VICTOR[I-]A AVGGG, armoured Roma seated facing left, holding Victory on a globe with her right hand and a sword in her left hand.
AR siliqua, 1,37g, minted in Gaul before 415. Unpublished.

South-central Gaul was the heart of the Visigothic Kingdom from 418 to 507. The pseudo-imperial coinage of this period consists mainly of solidi and tremisses. Siliquae are also known. All denominations are very similar to their Roman archetypes, faithfully copying legends and designs, albeit crudely. The tremissis was worth a third of a solidus, and the siliqua an eighth of a tremissis. The coins do not bear any identifying marks to distinguish them from Roman issues; they are identified by style and archaeological context. The dating is hence approximate.

The most probable mint for these issues is Toulouse, in South Gaul, the royal capital. It is thought that there was also a mint at Narbonne, where in 414 Ataulf married Galla Placidia, sister of Honorius. This hypothesis arises from a solidus, now lost, but published in the 18th century, minted in the name of Priscus Attalus, a puppet emperor supported by Ataulf. This coin bears the mintmark "NB", which may indicate Narbonne. A mint at Narbonne is also referenced in a poem of Sidonius Apollinaris (carmen 23) of 460, but under imperial control - as no issues from such a mint are known this may be poetic license. Narbonne definitely had a mint during the reign of Liuvigild in the late 6th century, but minting likely already started in 507, when the city became the capital of the Visigothic Kingdom.

The Visigothic coinage in Gaul were initially imitations of Western Roman coinage, which ended in around 481. After 509, imitations of Byzantine coinage follow, starting with those of Anastasius I Dicorus.

=== Imitations of Honorius ===
The first coins of the Visigoths, struck approximately between 420 and 440, imitate those minted in Ravenna by Honorius (393-423). The most common type has an obverse type with the legend D N HONORI – VS P F AVG and the bust of the emperor facing right, wearing a diadem and armour. On the reverse the legend reads VICTORI – A AVGGG and the emperor is depicted on foot, holding a labarum with his right hand, and a globe bearing a Victory in his left hand. His left foot rests on a prostrate captive. On the side of the emperor the letters R – V indicate the mint of Ravenna, and the exergue bears the inscription COMOB.

The coinage of the Visigoths can be distinguished from the imperial prototypes by the style. The engraving is generally more crude, and small figures have disproportionately large heads with respect to their bodies. The letters of the inscriptions also vary; the vertical bars of the "G" are short whereas in the originals they are particularly long.

=== Imitations of Valentinian III ===
Imitation of Valentinian III: tremissis
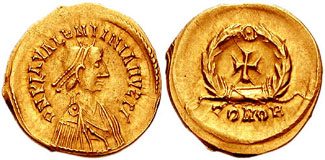
First side of the image: D N PLA VALENTINIANVS P G, bust of emperor facing right, with pearl-diadem, armour and drapery.
Second side of the image: COMOB, cross within a laurel wreath.
AV tremissis, 1,44 g, minted c. 471-507. MEC 171.

From c. 450 the Visigoths produced imitations of the coins of Valentinian III (425-455). One type of solidus and two types of tremissis were issued under his name. The solidus is catalogued as MEC 167-9, and copies a coin of the same value, Cohen VIII 212, 19. The obverse shows a portrait of the emperor facing right, with diadem, mantle and armour. On the reverse the emperor stands with a foot on a serpent with a human head. In his right hand he holds a cross, and in his left a globe supporting a Victory.

The first tremissis (MEC 171-172) depicts on the reverse a cross encircled by a laurel wreath, and imitates a tremissis struck in various mints (Cohen VIII 216, 49), while the second (MEC 173) imitates a solidus (Cohen VIII 212, 17). On the reverse of this issue, Victory is depicted facing, holding a cross and with a star in the field to the right.

==== Imitation of Libius Severus ====
Various solidi in the name of Libius Severus (461-5) exist (Cohen VIII, 227.8). The most common type is the same as that of the solidi of Valentinian III, with the emperor standing on a human-headed snake.

Imitation of Libius Severus: solidus
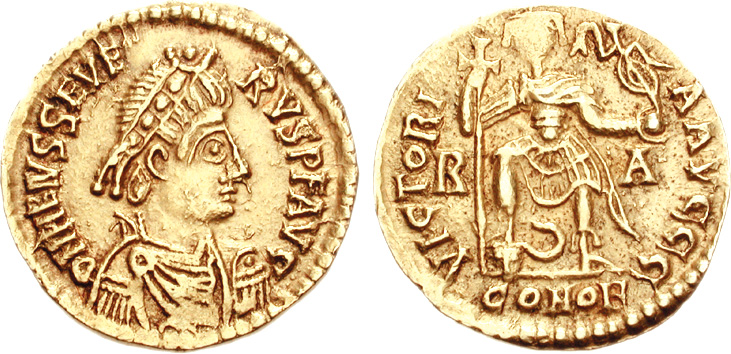
First side of the image: D N HBIVS SEVE-RVS P F AVG, bust of emperor facing right.
Second side of the image: VICTORIA AUGGG, standing emperor, feet on a human-headed serpent, with a cross and Victory. R-A//COMOB.
AV solidus, 4.38 g, c. 461-466. MEC 175

== Hispanic coinage ==
The Visigothic kingdom in Spain at its height c. 650, showing known mint locations.

In 507 the Battle of Vouillé was fought between the Franks commanded by King Clovis I and the Visigoths led by Alaric II. Alaric was killed in the battle, and the Visigothic army suffered a crushing defeat, which led to Clovis' conquest of Toulouse and the large part of the Visigothic possessions in Gaul. The Visigoths only succeeded in defending Septimania, between the mouth of the Rhône and the Pyrenees.

The centre of the Visigothic state was then in the old Roman province of Hispania Tarraconensis, then in the central Iberian Peninsula, where their kingdom prospered until the Islamic invasion of 711.

=== Pseudo-imperial coinage (509-580) ===
Imitation of Justinian I: tremissis
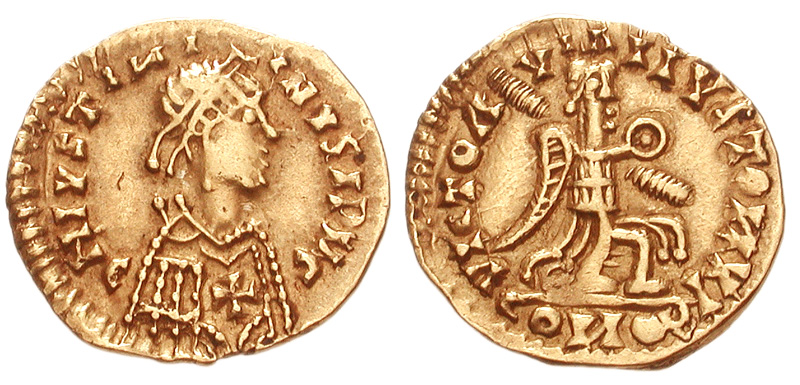
First side of the image: C N IVSTIИIINVS IPVC, bust of emperor facing right.
Second side of the image: VICTOΛ VIΛ IIVSTOИVI, Victory facing right, holding a palm and a crown; COИOB.
AV, tremissis, 15mm, 1,42 g. Mint of Narbonne or Barcelona. c. AD 527-565. Not in MEC.

The coinage of this period consist exclusively of solidi and tremisses. A copper coin was historically considered part of this issue. Bearing the monogram AMR, it was associated with a tremissis of this period bearing the same letters. In the past this coin (MEC 341) was attributed to Amalaric (502-531), but modern scholarship attributes it to the Burgundian King Godomar (524-534).

The solidi minted in this period bear the names of the Byzantine emperors Anastasius I (491-518), Justin I (518-527) and Justinian I (527-565). They are distinguished from imperial issues by style, and other imitations by being exclusively found in the Iberian peninsula. The most common reverse types are: with a standing Victory holding a cross, above a letter rho, and a type with a Victory facing right, holding a palm, and raising a crown with her other hand.

=== Royal coinage (580-710) ===
From the 580s, the Visigothic kings began to strike coins in their own names. This last phase of the Visigothic coinage lasted a hundred and thirty years: coins beyond 710 are unknown, as the Visigothic kingdom was overthrown by the Umayyad invasion.

Only tremisses were minted in this period, and the purity of the gold used diminished over time. The coins bear the name of the king and also the name of the mint where they were struck. Unlike Frankish or later Anglo-Saxon coins, the name of the moneyer is not given.

==== From Liuvigild to Chindasuinth ====
Liuvigild: tremissis
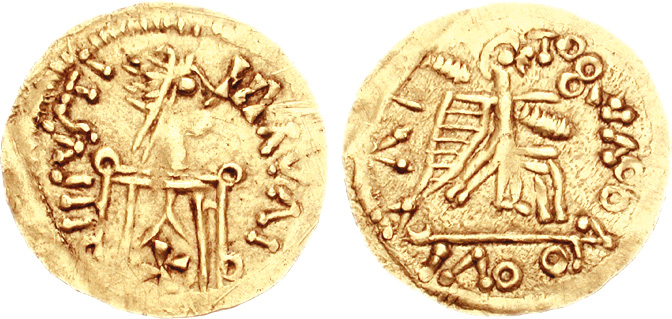
First side of the image: King facing right, with a cross superimposed on his tunic. Blundered legend.
Second side of the image: Victory advancing with palm and crown, crescent on the line of the exeurge; ILOON.
AV (1,39 g, 6h), c. 580-583. MEC 209.

The first of the royal coinage was issued during the reign of Liuvigild (567-586). For a short period coins imitating Byzantine issues, but with the name of Visigothic king were struck - an example is MEC 210. This tremissis of Liuvigild was minted in Barcelona. The obverse shows a stylised bust of the king facing left, with the legend "XIVVIGILDVS"; on the reverse, a cross on steps, with the legend "REX VARCINONA", identifying the mint. Another type, MEC 209, shows the king facing right on the obverse, and Victory with a palm and crown on the reverse.

Issues of Liuvigild with a facing bust on both the obverse and the reverse are known. According to Grierson, this new type, characteristic of Visigothic coinage, was started between 579 and 586, in the last years of Liuvigild's reign, when his brother Liuva I, who had earlier reigned with him, had already died. Grierson further argues that the introduction of the royal coinage, featuring the names of the Visigothic kings in the place of those of the Byzantine Emperors, was connected with the eldest son of Liuvigild, Saint Hermenegild, who was named co-regnant in 573, and married his wife Ingund in 579. His wife was a Frankish princess, and therefore was not an Arian but rather a Chalcedonian Christian. Following his marriage, Hermenegild abandoned Arianism, rebelling against his father and assuming the title of king, in a widespread revolt which was only subdued in 584. Hermenegild died in the following year, and his death allowed his brother Reccared I to become king. The struggle between Liuvigild and Hermenegild is thought to have resulted in the striking of coinage bearing the names of the two claimants to the crown.

From approximately 584 to 649, the most common type was that with a facing bust on either side, with one side bearing the name of the king, and the other that of the mint. This type was only minted after the defeat of Hermenegild by Liuvigild; it is thought that the innovation might have been to indicate the new status of Reccared as co-regnant. Coins were minted in this style for over sixty years, until the end of the reign of Chindasuinth (641-652).

The bust types of the coins vary between mints and across reigns. It is notable that the monarchs are shown uncrowned, despite the fact that according to Saint Isidore of Seville, Liuvigild introduced this symbol of kingship to the Visigoths. Instead, at least one of the busts is shown with shoulder-length hair, a symbol of regal authority among the ancient Germanic peoples.

==== From Recceswinth to Wittiza ====
Around 649 a new type was introduced, with the reverse bearing the name of Recceswinth, now associated with the throne of his father Chindasuinth. The reverse features a monogram of the mint's name in place of the usual facing portrait of Chindasuinth, and instead the obverse bears a bust in profile. After the death of Chindasuinth, the mints would not have had instructions regarding the style or designs of the new issues, and consequently made different choices: some returned to the type bearing two busts, one on each side, for example Cordova and Toledo, others, including Seville continued with the new design featuring a monogram and a profile bust. Some others, including Girona, used a profile bust, but a cross on the reverse.

Tremissis of Erwig (680-687)
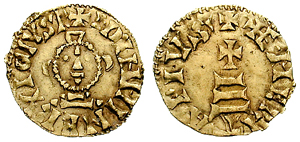
First side of the image: +ID IN M N ERVIGIVS RX, facing bust of Christ with a cross behind his head
Second side of the image: +EMERITΛ PIVS, cross over three steps.
(1,43 g). mint of Emerita (Mérida). Miles 415a; MEC 267

For the rest of the reign of Recceswinth, all the mints issued a type with a profile bust, and a cross mounted on a set of steps on the reverse. Different bust types are known; in some cases the bust is shown helmeted, in other cases with a bare head. The king is generally shown with a beard, in contrast with the busts on previous issues, which were stylised in accordance with Byzantine prototypes. In the following reigns, the same type was issued; only during the joint reign of Egica and Wittiza was another type introduced, which featured two facing busts separated by a sceptre surmounted by a cross.

Another distinct issue is the tremissis coined under Erwig, with a facing bust of Christ (MEC 267) in place of the king, and on the reverse a cross mounting a set of steps. The first tremisses with this type seemed to have been coined at the mint of Mérida, Spain. Over the years, the quality of the engraving of the dies deteriorated, and on some coins the arms of the cross behind Christ's head resemble ears. This type preceded a similar, albeit finer, issue of Justinian II, which was issued in around 692. The coinage of Justinian featured a bust of Christ with a cross superimposed on his halo. Grierson hypothesises that these issues reflect the important theological issues of the day, in particular the condemnation of Monothelitism by a synod in Rome in 679, and by the Third Council of Constantinople in 680 to 681.

No legitimate issues are known after the reign of Wittiza, which ended in 710. However, forgeries of a coinage of Roderic are recorded (MEC 1471).

== Legends and epigraphy ==
REX monogram

The legend normally gives the name of the king in Latin, followed by REX, sometimes abbreviated as a monogram as shown to the left.

During the joint reign of Egica and Wittiza, the titles given were reges, abbreviated as RGS, RG or similar. Only under Liuvigild and Ermenegild does one find the name of the king in the genitive, rather than the nominative, and preceded by D N, an abbreviation for dominus. Under Chindasuinth, the mint of Toledo introduced the legend INDN, abbreviating In nomine Domini (in the name of the Lord), which became common until the reign of Wamba, with various other abbreviations known, such as INDNM, INDIMN. The coinage of Egica also sometimes bear the legend N + P N•M•, an abbreviation of In Xristi Nomine (in the name of Christ).

The names of the kings were written in various ways, for example Suintila is found as SVINTHVLΛ, SINTILΛ, SVINTH:L:, SVINTIIV among others, Liuva as LEOVΛ, LIVVΛ and similar. The number of variants increases notably with more complicated names such as Chindasuinth and Recceswinth, in which some letters commonly end up being combined as a ligature or monogram.

The reverse bears the name of the mint, also in Latin. TOLETO, CORDODΛ (CORΛOBΛ, CORDOBΛ, CORΔOBΛ), ELLIBERI (IIBERI), ISPΛLI, ELVORΛ (ERBO:RΛ) indicate Toledo, Cordoba, Eliberi or Illiberis (modern-day Granada), Ispalis (Seville), and Elvorra (Évora) respectively. In some cases the mint is indicated only by a monogram.

The epigraphy of the Visigothic coinage is characteristic. The letter "A" is normally written without a bar - Λ. The letter D is commonly replaced with a Greek delta (Δ). Likewise the group th is often written using a Greek theta (Θ). The letter "L" is often rendered simply as a cross, +, for example +IVVIGI+DVS for Liuvigild, and sometimes the letter "D" is used in place of a "B". Ligatures of up to five letters are known. Sometimes dots are substituted for letters, especially vowels, normally two as a colon, but sometimes one or three, an example being SVINTH:L: for Suintila.

The name of the mint on the reverse is typically followed by a royal epithet. The most common is PIVS, but IVSTUS is also commonly found. FELIX and VICTOR are also known.

== Mints ==
The distribution of mints. The names of the mints with the largest number of extent coins are capitalised.

Miles identifies 79 mints. A few others have subsequently come to light, and therefore the total currently known is a little over 80.

The majority of mints were of relatively little importance and are known only thanks to a few extent examples, in some cases not more than one or two.

Around half of the 3500 coins conserved originated from four mints: the capital Toleto (Toledo) and three southern centres: Emerita (Mérida), Ispalis (Siviglia) and Cordoba (Cordova). Other important centres of production, with a hundred to two hundred coins known for each, were Eliberis, close to modern day Granada, and three more northerly mints: Cesaracosta (Zaragoza), Tarraco (Tarragona) and Narbona (Narbonne). Narbona was the last mint under Visigothic control north of the Pyrenees after the Battle of Vouillé.

Other minor mints were found in Gallaecia (roughly modern day Galicia), where there had been important mines from Roman times.

We do not have any documentation of the mints and little is known of their organisation or the relationship between the mints and the Visigothic state, beyond what can be inferred from the changes in the coinage over time.

== Hoards ==
Several major hoards of Visigothic coins are known, the most important recent discovery being that of Zorita de los Canes, unearthed by archaeologists in 1945.

A hoard of coins of Reccared I and various other monarchs was found in Garrovillas de Alconétar, in 1731. The exact composition of the hoard is unknown, but a large part of it was acquired by the Real Academia de la Historia, where it remains to the present day. A hoard found in Bordeaux in 1803 included 38 Visigothic tremisses from the reign of Liuvigild to Wamba, although at least three were forgeries. In 1816, a hoard of over 800 coins was found in La Grassa, near Constantí, but it was scattered soon after its discovery.

The hoard of La Capilla, discovered in 1891, likely included between 800 and 1000 coins, is one of the most important. Although the coins were dispersed soon after their discovery, over a third of the extent specimens are now found in the collection of the Hispanic Society of America. In 1932, 110 Visigothic coins were found in Abusejo, and deposited at the National Archaeological Museum of Spain and the Instituto Valencia of Don Juan.

The hoard of Zorita de los Canes, found at the site of the Christian basilica in the Visigothic city of Reccopolis, in 1945, includes 90 tremisses, the latest being issues of Livuigild I, which, while not bearing the names of the mint, were presumably produced locally.
