= Palacete of the Viscounts of Balsemão =

Palacette of the Viscounts of Balsemão
- Palacete dos Viscondes de Balsemão
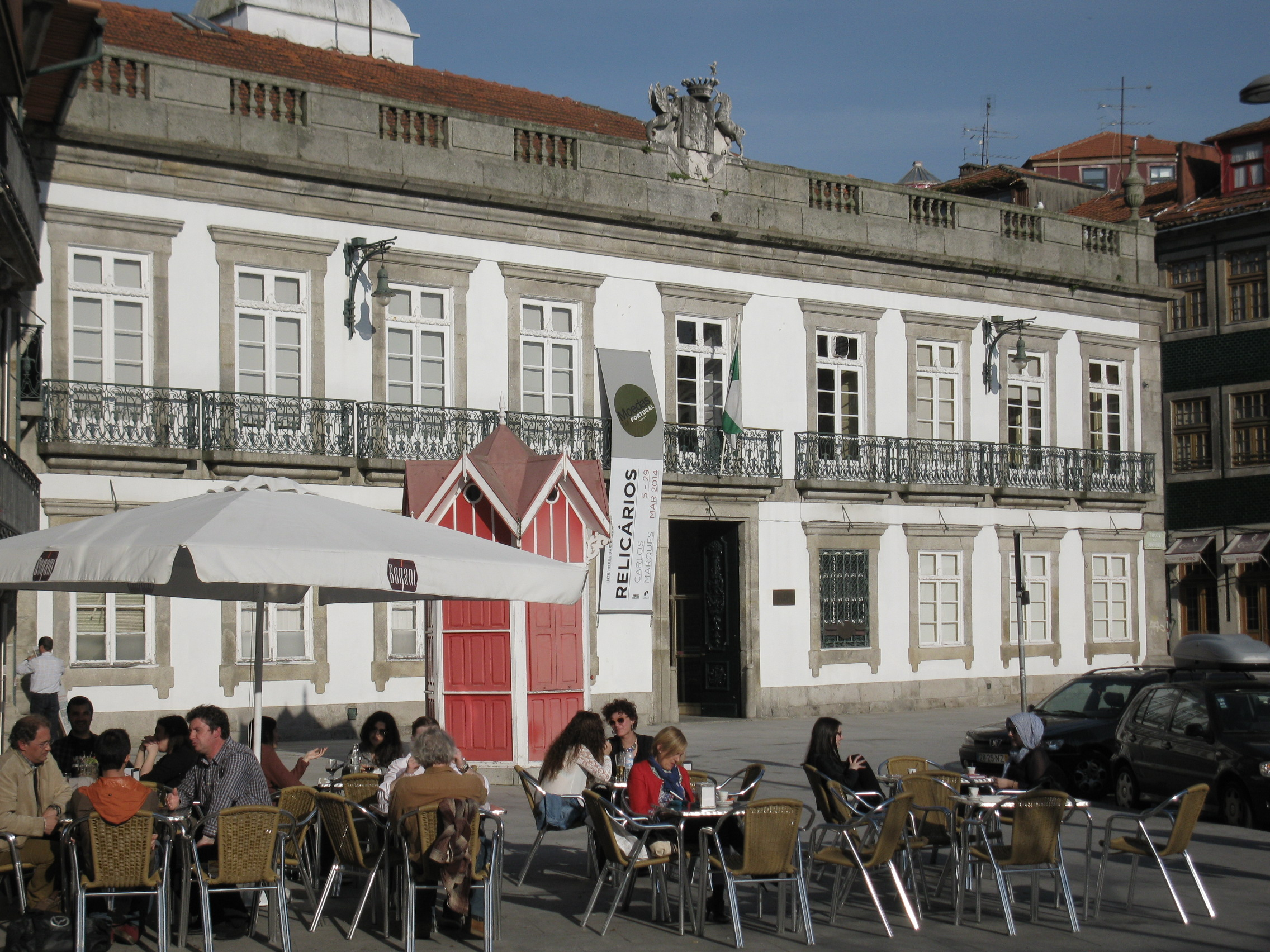
- The front facade of the former-manorhouse of the Viscounts fronting the Carlos Alberto Square
- Interactive map of the Palacette of the Viscounts of Balsemão area

General information
- Type: Palacette
- Architectural style: Baroque
- Location: Cedofeita, Santo Ildefonso, Sé, Miragaia, São Nicolau e Vitória, Portugal
- Coordinates: 41°08′56″N 8°36′55″W
- Opened: 18th century
- Owner: Portugal

Technical details
- Material: Granite

The Palacette of Viscounts of Balsemão (Portuguese: Palacete dos Viscondes de Balsemão) is a former-residence in the civil parish of Cedofeita, Santo Ildefonso, Sé, Miragaia, São Nicolau e Vitória, in the northern Portuguese city of Porto.

== History ==
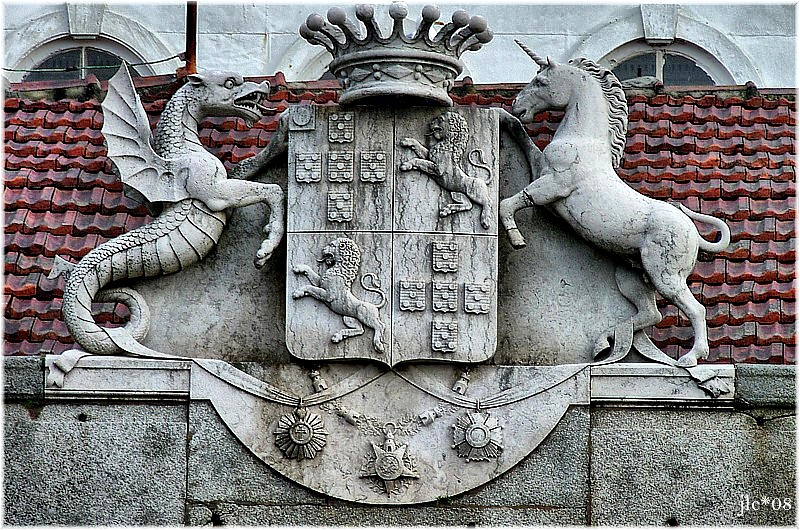
The coat-of-arms of the Viscount of Trindade

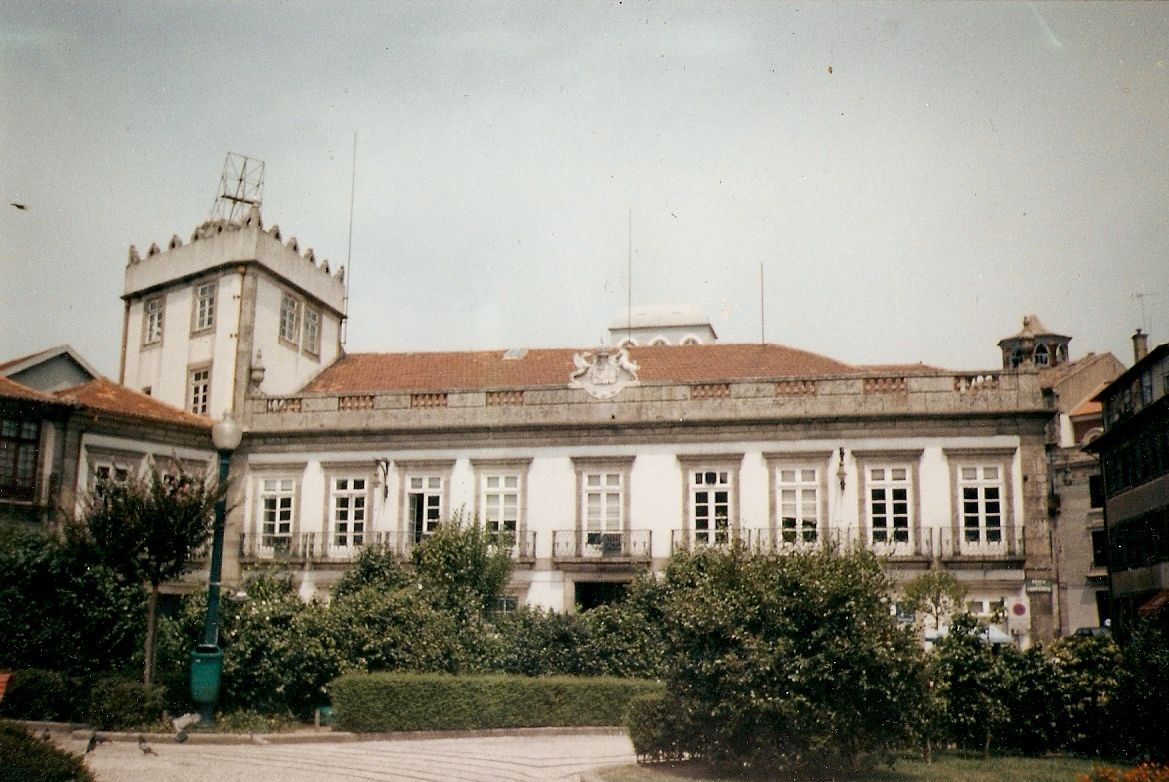
The residenace of the Viscounts of Balsemão and Trindade along the Praça Carlos Alberto

In the second-half of the 18th century, the residence was constructed by nobleman José Alvo Brandão, along the then-designated Largo dos Ferradores.

Following the 1800 wedding of D. Maria Rosa Alvo and her cousin/step-brother, Luís Máximo Alfredo Pinto de Sousa Coutinho (later the second Viscount of Balsemão) the house passed into the hands of the Balsemão family.

Between 1834 and 1837, following the death of the second Viscount, the spaces were used provisionally to house the Academia Politécnica do Porto (Poly-technic Academy of Porto), while the old Academy was occupied by the military hospital, during the Liberal Wars.

In 1840, António Bernardino Pexe (or Peixe) rented the building, and transferred to the site, his lodging from Rua do Bonjardim. In April 1849, Charles Albert of Sardinia, King of Sardinia, took refuge in Portugal during this time, following his defeat at the Battle of Novara. While his home was being prepared, the former-king installed his residence at the Palacette. In 1852, the square began to be re-designated Praça Carlos Alberto for the former monarch.

Two years later it was acquired by the 1st Viscount of Trindade, José António de Sousa Basto, a great property-owner and capitalist, he complete a complete renovation of the building. Between 1885 and 1886, painter Francisco José Resende executed four paintings for the Viscount (portraits of D. Luís I, Queen D. Maria Pia, Prince D. Carlos and the Infante D. Afonso) ordered by counsel José Guilherme Pacheco, that later found their way to various municipal buildings. In 1862, the King D. Luís I and Queen D. Maria Pia, went to the palacette to visit King Carlos Alberto, grandfather of D. Maria Pia.

Throughout the 20th century, the building was expanded, renovated and modernized to support the activities on the site. Following the Republican revolution, in 1907 the Gas Company of Lisbon began operating from the site, eventually assuming the role of the municipal services of Porto by 1920, responsible for gas and electricity. It was only in 1959 that the municipal council of Porto bought the building from the descendants of the Viscount of Trindade. In 1989, its descendant, EDP (the national energy/electricity producer), moved out of the building.

The municipal council installed the Culture Directorate (Direção de Cultura) in the building in 1996.

In 2004, the Resende portraits were re-united, restored and placed on exhibition in the palacette once more.

== Architecture ==
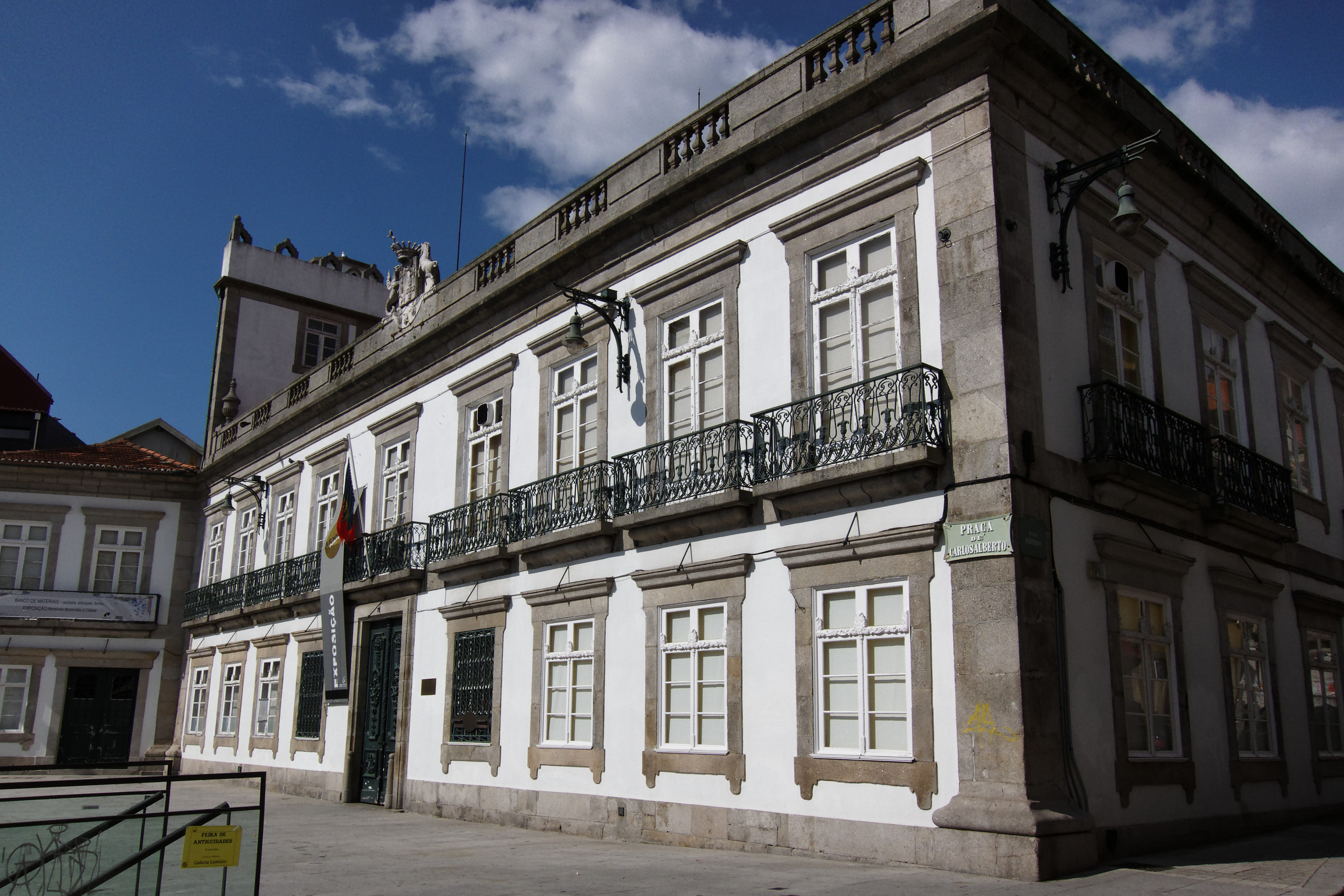
An oblique view of the residence

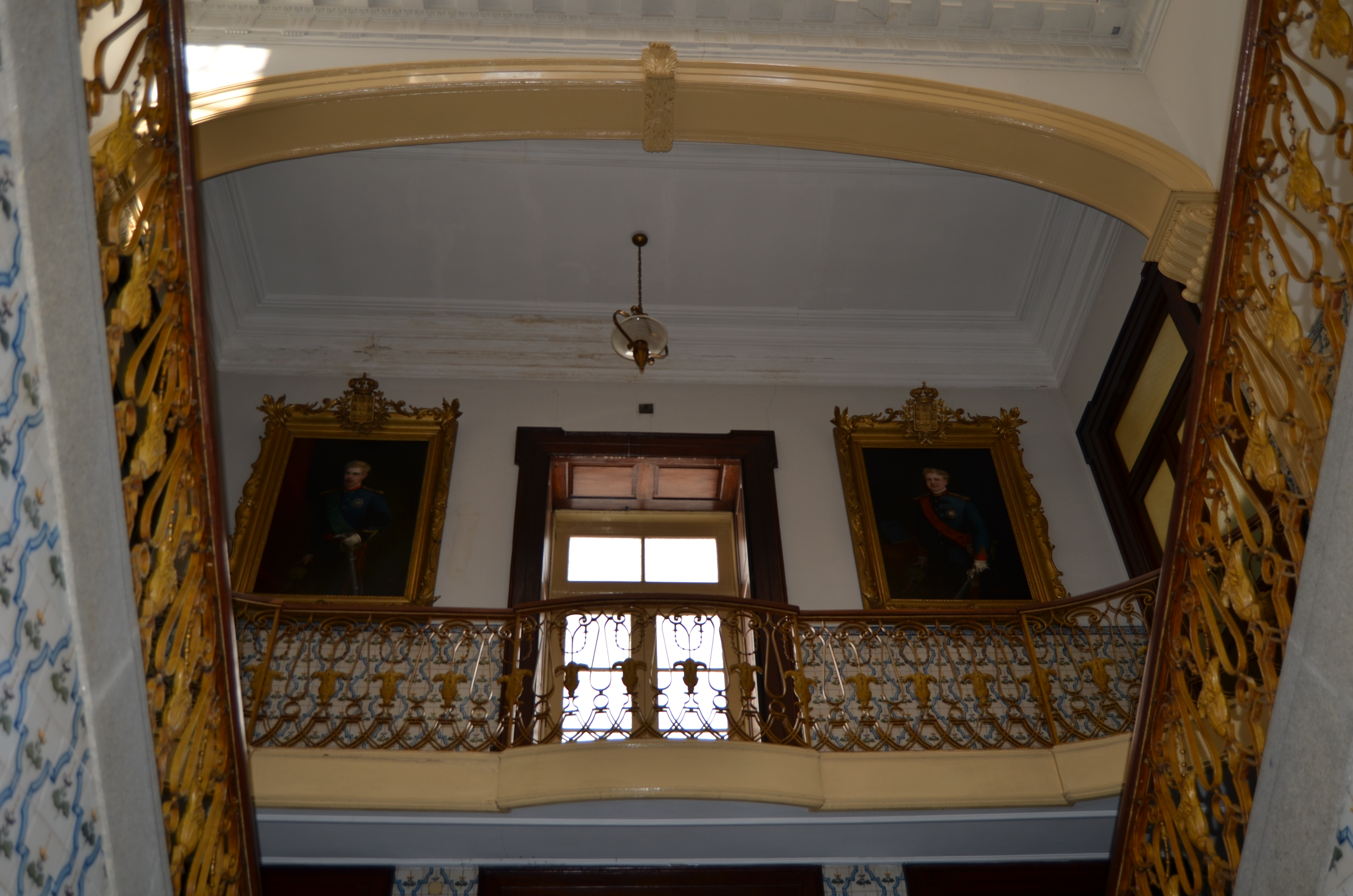
A view from the atrium with lateral staircase

The former-residence is implanted in the northeast corner of Praça Carlos Alberto, delimited laterally by the Travessa das Oliveiras and encircled by buildings dating from the 18th and 19th century. The building is in near proximity to the Third Order Carmelites' Church, the old Carmelite Convent, Fountain of Leões, the old Faculty of Sciences Building of the University of Porto, the Clerics Tower and the former courthouse and jail of Porto.

The horizontal plan, composed of three architectural nuclei consisting of a principal building, lateral annex and triangular tower, with differentiated and articulated ceilings covered in roof tile. The facades are plastered and painted white, encircled by granite emassemente, pilastered cornerstones and decorated with cornices and friezes. The main facade is oriented towards the west, that includes two floors separated by friezes, with a framed, granite central doorway on the ground floor flanked by four veins of framed rectangular windows. On the second floor there are nine windows framed similarly to those on the ground floor. The principal facade of the lateral building extends architecturally from the main building, with a ground floor with a door and windows on both floors. Integrated into the construction, the tower's third floor is only visible. The lateral facade, oriented to the southeast, includes three windows on the first floor, and five windows on the second floor. On the eastern facade, with access by gate to the Travessa das Oliveiras, faces the patio that served as access to the gardens.

The interior is marked by an ample atrium, with stone floors, azulejo tile, stucco and white-painted walls, divided by pilasters. From this atrium is a staircase that extends to the second floors, with an intermediary landing that divides into two flights of parallel staircases with worked iron guardrails and eight-sided lantern. All the halls has stucco ceilings and walls with painted white. The dance hall has a vaulted ceiling with musical decorations and a small varanda.
