= History of Carmona, Spain =

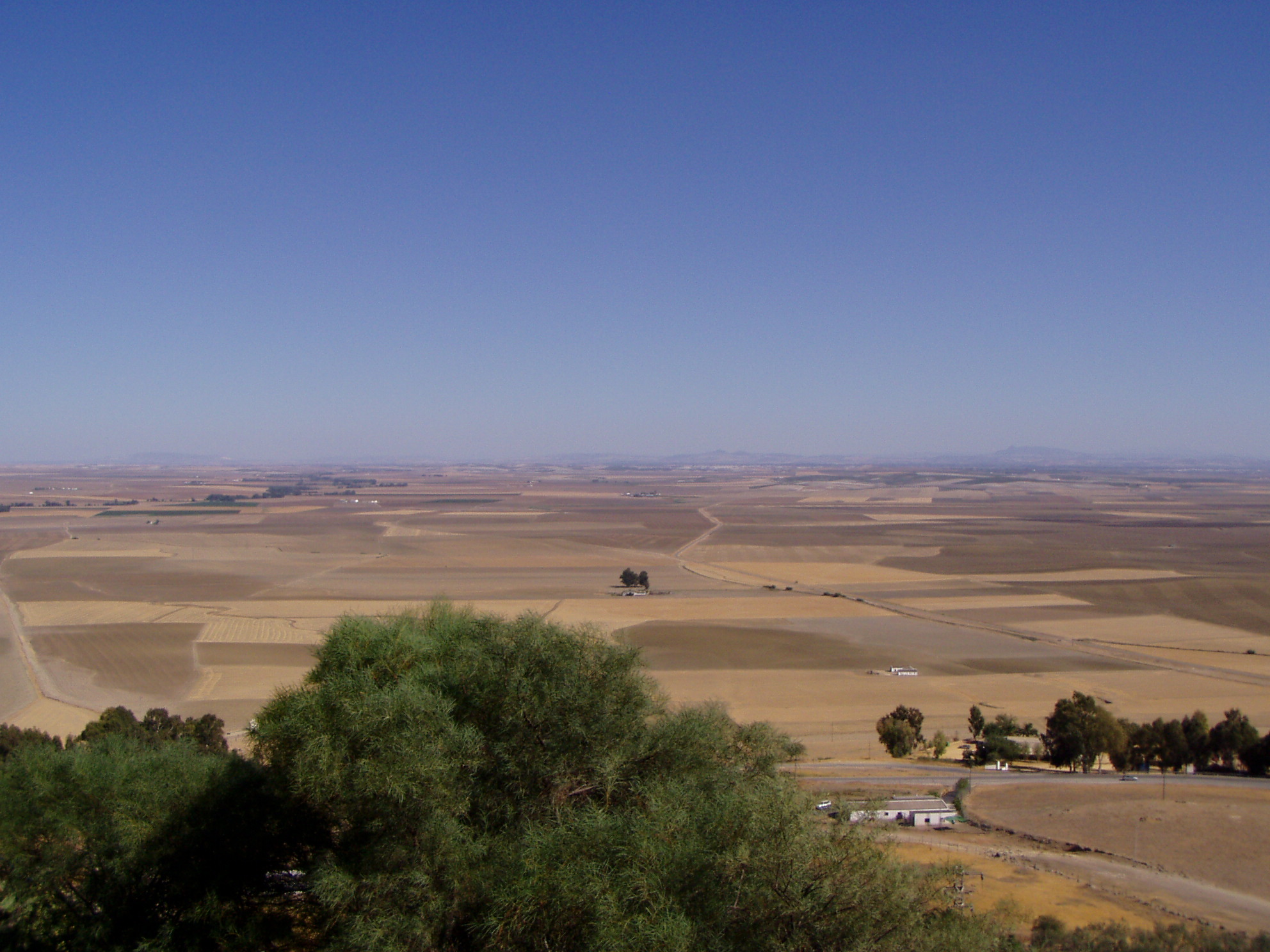
Vega of Carmona

The history of Carmona begins at one of the oldest urban sites in Europe, with nearly five thousand years of continuous occupation on a plateau rising above the vega (plain) of the River Corbones in Andalusia, Spain. The city of Carmona lies thirty kilometres from Seville on the highest elevation of the sloping terrain of the Los Alcores escarpment, about 250 metres above sea level. Since the first appearance of complex agricultural societies in the Guadalquivir valley at the beginning of the Neolithic period, various civilizations have had an historical presence in the region. All the different cultures, peoples, and political entities that developed there have left their mark on the ethnographic mosaic of present-day Carmona. Its historical significance is explained by the advantages of its location. The easily defended plateau on which the city sits, and the fertility of the land around it, made the site an important population center. The town's strategic position overlooking the vega was a natural stronghold, allowing it to control the trails leading to the central plateau of the Guadalquivir valley, and thus access to its resources.

The area around Carmona has been inhabited since prehistoric times; although Paleolithic remains have been found, those of the Neolithic are much more abundant. The end of the Chalcolithic period between 2500 and 2000 BC is marked by the appearance of the profusely decorated vessels of the Bellbeaker culture from the necropolis of El Acebuchal. Scattered finds of ceramics have established Bronze Age occupation of the area, and by the late Iron Age this was a Tartessian settlement. From the mid-8th century BC, a stable core population had developed on the wide plateau where the current city is situated.

With the arrival of Phoenician traders from Tyre, Carmona underwent a radical change. The Tartessian-Turdetani village was transformed into a city from its nucleus in the neighbourhood of present-day San Blas. The circular huts were replaced by rectangular houses, built on the Phoenician model and arranged in a planned urban layout. The population built defences with walls of sloping masonry on its vulnerable western flank, and continued to consolidate until the mid-6th century BC, when the Tyrian Phoenician trade network disintegrated. Carthage then expanded its commercial hegemony, and by the beginning of the 5th century BC had established itself as the dominant military power in the western Mediterranean. During the 3rd century BC, Carthage made Iberia the new base for its empire and its campaigns against the Roman Republic, and occupied most of Andalusia.

The name '"Carmona" may have derived from the Semitic root words, Kar (city) and Hammon, (the sun-god worshipped in Carthage), as in Kar-Hammon (the "city of Hammon"). From the Turdetani core, the city developed into an important Carthaginian trading colony; some remains of the walls of this stage are preserved in the Puerta de Sevilla.

The conquest of the Iberian Peninsula in 237 BC by Punic Carthaginians under the command of Hamilcar Barca began a turbulent era which culminated in the Punic Wars and the Roman conquest. The Battle of Carmona was fought near the city in 207 BC, during the Second Punic War (218-202 BC). The Roman general Scipio defeated forces commanded by the Carthaginian generals Hasdrubal Gisco and Mago and the Numidian general Masinissa. This was one of Scipio's first major battles in Hispania; the engagement is described by Appian at 5.25–28 in his Iberica.

The Puerta de Sevilla (Seville Gate) and its bastion were built originally by the Carthaginians around 230–220 BC. The Romans later made several modifications, focusing on reconstruction of the main access gate to the walled town, and modified the bastion itself, which, like the gate, still exists.

The Romans conquered Carmona, as well as the other cities of the region under the rule of Carthage, in the Punic Wars; its "mighty wall" was mentioned by Julius Caesar in his De Bello Civile. The city was made a tributary to Rome, and received the dispensation to mint its own coinage bearing the name "Carmo". Carmo was part of the Legal Convent of Asitigitana (Écija), and was granted the status of civium Romanorum, its inhabitants being assigned to the rural tribe Galeria.

In the second half of the 1st century, with the social stability brought by the Pax Romana, Carmo became a crossroads on the Via Augusta and an important outpost of the Roman empire (the highway, by then called El Arrecife, was still used in the Middle Ages; a few remnants of some sections and a bridge have survived). This period was perhaps the most culturally brilliant in the history of Carmona, and traces of it are still perceptible. The current city is laid out roughly on the Roman urban plan; the Cardo Maximus ran from the Seville Gate to the Cordoba gate, and the site of the ancient forum, now coinciding approximately with the Plaza de Arriba, is still a centre of urban activity.

At the end of the 3rd century, Carmona entered a gradual decline, which led eventually to: the dismantling of public and religious buildings, a general contraction of the urban area, the depopulation of nearby villages, and the abandonment of large landed properties. However, after the fall of the Western Roman Empire, the dissolution of Roman authority in Hispania Baetica and its replacement by a Visigothic monarchy was a long, slow process. There was no sudden Visigothic invasion or conquest. The Visigoths were superior to the Hispano-Roman population only in the exercise of arms; economically, socially, and culturally the Hispanic population of the southern Iberian peninsula was more advanced.

Byzantine Spania 5

Carmona may have been very briefly a part of Spania, a province of the Byzantine Empire that existed for a few decades (552–624) along the south of the Iberian Peninsula. The Byzantines occupied many of the coastal cities in Baetica and the region remained a Byzantine province until its reconquest by the Visigoths barely seventy years later.

From the beginning of the 8th century until the middle of the 13th century, the city was part of Muslim al-Andalus, and functioned as an Islamic society, leaving a deep imprint on its culture and physical appearance. Its most notable attestation comes from a decisive 763 battle between Abd-ar-Rahman I's troops and a pro-Abbasid force that confirmed the Umayyad commander's status as independent emir of Cordova. Carmona retained its political importance during the Muslim era, and became the capital of one of the first Taifa kingdoms. In 1057, Abbad II al-Mu'tadid, Emir of the Taifa of Išbīliya (Seville) drove the Almoravids from Qarmūnâ. In 1247, Qarmūnâ capitulated without resistance to Rodrigo González Girón, steward of the Christian king Ferdinand III of Castile. The terms of surrender guaranteed its Muslim population the opportunity to stay in their homes and keep their property, their religion and their customs, or to leave.

In 1252, Alfonso X began the Repartimiento, the distribution of large grants of land and homes to nobles, knights and smallholding citizens. Beyond rewarding his allies, the king's general policy was to repopulate the countryside by encouraging Christian settlers who could become landowners themselves. The disadvantaged and common laborers received plots which included a home and about 60 hectares of arable land in the vega of the Corbones.

During the reign (1350–1369) of Pedro the Cruel, Carmona benefited from his predilection for the city. He enlarged the citadel of the Puerta de Marchena and made it one of his favored residences. This Alcázar del rey Don Pedro was the theatre of the siege by Henry of Trastámara against Pedro's chief steward, Martín López de Córdoba, who was confined there with the king's sons and treasure after his violent death in Montiel. Later, during the reigns of John II and Henry IV, Carmona was the scene where the rivalry between the noble houses of Ponce de León and Guzman played out.

Carmona complied with the many requests from Isabella I of Castile and Ferdinand II of Aragon for able-bodied men, soldiers and teamsters to wage their series of military campaigns in the Granada War (Guerra de Granada) (1482–1492). After the outbreak of hostilities between the Catholic Monarchs (Los Reyes Católicos) and the Emirate of Granada, troops from Carmona participated in nearly every operation of the war.

In 1630, Philip IV granted Carmona the status of "ciudad" (city), in exchange for 40,000 ducats.

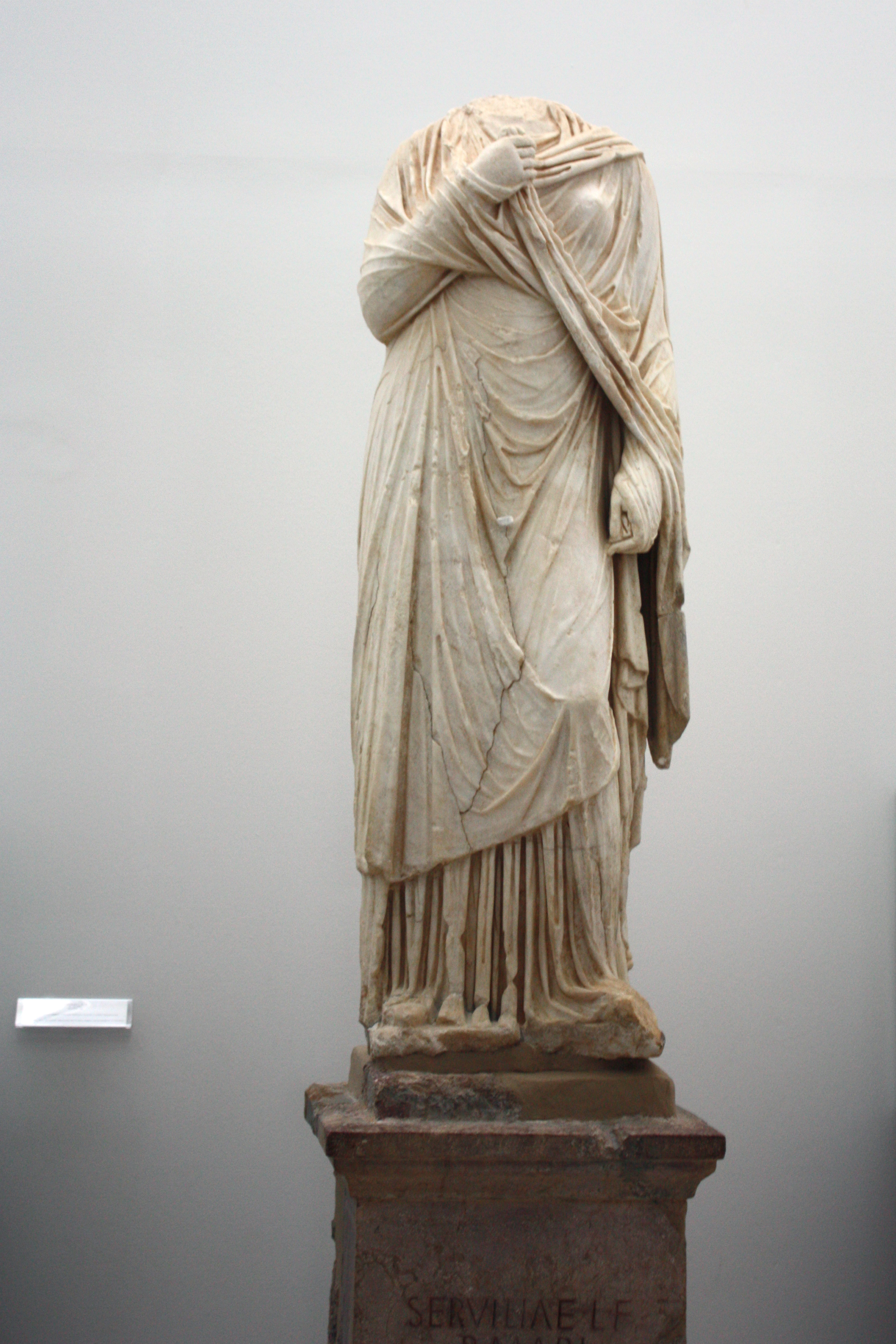
The pedestal on this funerary statue of Servilia bears the dedication: "To Serviliae, daughter of Lucius, wife of Publius Marius, from her mother."

In 1885, the French-born English archaeologist George Bonsor discovered the Roman Necropolis of Carmona and excavated it with his colleague and business partner, the local academic Juan Fernández López. This ancient cemetery consists of hundreds of tombs, the largest of which are collective familial mausoleums. The majority are dated between the 1st century BC and the 2nd century AD. The necropolis was built and used mainly during the first centuries of Roman domination, so the bodies were usually cremated according to customary Roman rituals although there were also inhumations.

Bonsor and Fernandez exploited the site commercially, selling many of the valuable antiquities discovered there. They raised an enclosure around their excavations and surrounded it with guards. In the center of the property they built an archaeological museum of functional design "in situ", which also housed Bonsor and his personal collection of objects; here he entertained visiting foreign archaeologists. The inauguration of the museum and public display of the necropolis took place on 24 May 1885. The same year Bonsor and Fernandez discovered two large tombs, popularly known as the Tomb of Servilia and the Tomb of the Elephant.

The Carmona Archaeological Society (Sociedad Arqueológica de Carmona), a private scholarly group, was also founded in 1885. Based at number 15 San Felipe Street, next to the offices of the newspaper La Verdad ("The Truth"), the group sought to give a scientific and academic lustre to the Carmonan community.

A large hoard of Visigothic gold coins was found in 1891 at La Capilla, about five miles east of Carmona. Only 67 of 505 coins were definitively identified.

The Andalucista politician, writer, and historian Blas Infante, known as the father of Andalusian nationalism (Padre de la Patria Andaluza), was seized and summarily executed 11 August 1936 by Franco's forces on the Seville road to Carmona at the beginning of the Spanish Civil War.

On 28 February 1980, a commission formed by nine representatives of all the Andalusian parliamentary parties met in Carmona and approved a first draft of the original Statute of Autonomy of Andalusia, or Statute of Carmona (Estatuto de Carmona); it was approved in 1981 by the Spanish national government.

== The origins of prehistoric Carmona ==
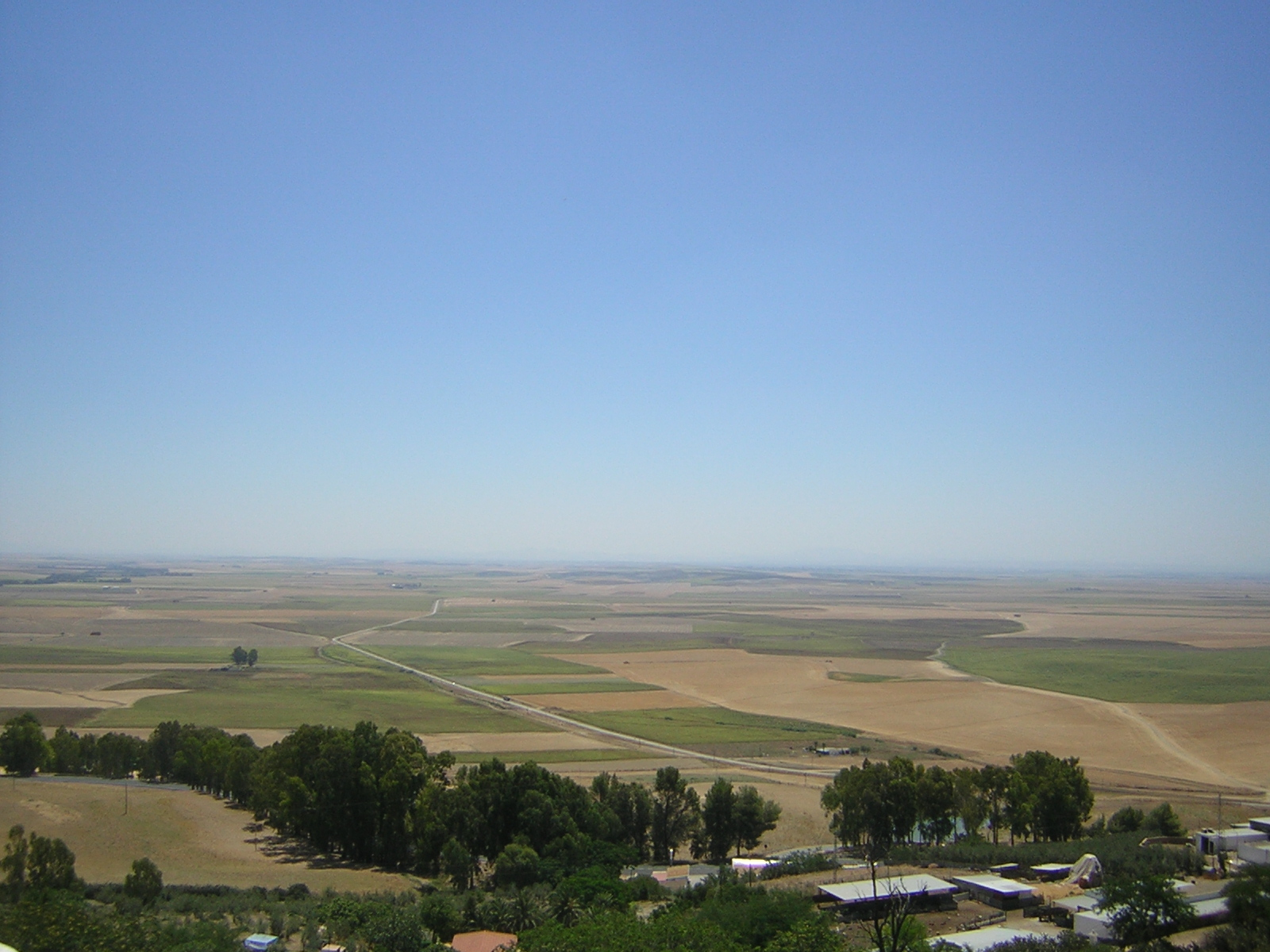
Panoramic view looking south from Carmona

The Iberian Peninsula had been inhabited by hominids for at least 400,000 years before the arrival in southern Iberia of anatomically modern humans 28,000–30,000 years ago in the area presently occupied by the municipality of Carmona and its environs. Here Homo sapiens practised a hunting and gathering lifestyle, living near rivers where game was most abundant and where there were raw materials for the manufacture of their primitive tools and weapons. With the later development and expansion of agriculture and animal husbandry in the Neolithic period, there was a radical change in social organisation and settlement patterns. As sedentism (living permanently in one place) was adopted, villages were formed as loose farming communities; these settlements were built near arable land and water, especially on river banks. The practice of cooperative agriculture led to higher crop yields and consequent population growth, putting pressure on resource areas required to produce food and necessitating their defense. Beginning in the late Neolithic and early Chalcolithic periods, villages were situated in naturally well-defended locations.

== The Chalcolithic: the beginnings of metallurgy in Carmona ==
Agriculture started in the Neolithic and Chalcolithic periods and became widespread by the early third millennium BC, resulting in intensive colonisation of the land suitable for farming in the Los Alcores and La Campiña regions of what is now the province of Seville.

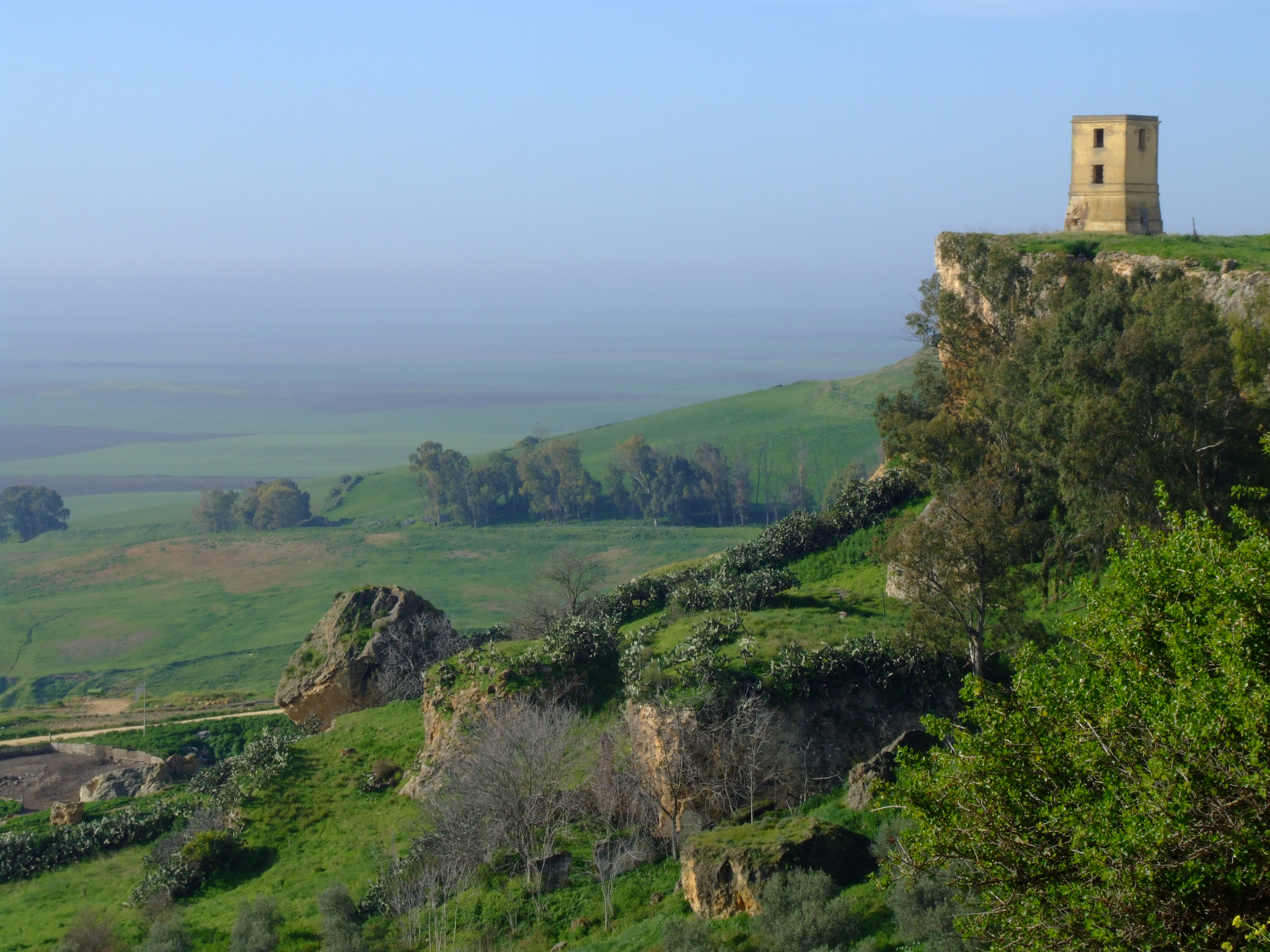
Picacho

The oldest settlement in the area around present-day Carmona corresponds to the El Campo Real zone, a geological formation located on the first uplift of the ridge of the Los Alcores plateau, southwest of the historical centre of Carmona, and separated from it by a deep depression. In 1898 George Bonsor discovered a total of forty-two silos excavated in the rock here, some of them containing burials. This site appears to date from the end of the Neolithic through the Chalcolithic.

The first settlement within the limits of present-day Carmona rose about 4500 years ago and spread across the plateau, the people preferring to occupy the higher elevations and slopes of the hills that dominate the fertile plain of the Corbones and the terraces that descend gradually to the Guadalquivir. There is evidence of Chalcolithic remains at the Alcázar de Arriba (Alcázar del Rey Don Pedro), in the Barranquillo and Picacho barrios, and much more diffusely, in the San Blas neighbourhood. As of 2012, there were no clear archaeological data to provide information about the ancient village, such as its physical configuration and economy, since documented remains are scarce and widely scattered. Excavations in a building plot on the street Calle Dolores Quintanilla have yielded some information about the earliest history of Carmona; apparently the town was formed by the merger of hut houses and granaries. The huts were circular, about 2–2.5 m in diameter and partially excavated in the rock with an elevation formed by a small plinth of stone and covered with branches plastered with mud. The silos next to the huts were circular, with a flared or truncated cone profile; these were also excavated in rock, and used to store grain. Following their usage-life, these underground structures were gradually filled with debris, including tools such as handmade ceramics, sickle blades and knives carved of stone, awls made of bone, and remnants of copper smelting slag, along with numerous bones of animals that served as food.

In 1888, a member of the Archaeological Society of Carmona, Vega Peláez, reported a major archaeological find during construction work at the intersection of Santa Catalina and Sacramento streets by the Ayuntamiento (City Hall). George Bonsor excavated the dolmen, which consists of a corridor 17 m in length leading to a circular chamber 3.5 m in diameter covered with a dome made of rows of limestone slabs and overlaid with a much larger slab of limestone.

== The Neolithic: Bellbeaker culture ==
The end of the Chalcolithic between 2500 and 2000 BC is marked by the appearance of a new type of decorated pottery vessels called Campaniforme for their inverted bell shape. These were profusely decorated ceramics, with incisions cut on the surface and filled with a whitish paste to form a variety of motifs. One of the first discoveries of this type was made at the nearby site, the necropolis of El Acebuchal, where Bonsor excavated many entire vessels. The dramatic finding, together with the broad dispersion of this type all over Europe, suggests a Carmonan origin. However, as of 2012, nothing has been found in the archaeological record of Carmona to substantiate this view. The Beaker pottery finds in the city have been few and far between; the numerous archaeological excavations being conducted in the city may yet shed more light on the subject.

== The Bronze Age ==
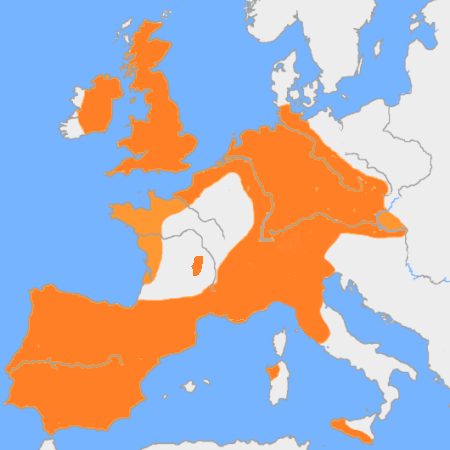
Extent of Bellbeaker culture in Europe

The Bronze Age is named for the use of an alloy of copper and tin to manufacture utilitarian objects, in contrast to the use of more or less pure copper in the previous period. This technological advance affected all aspects of local culture, social organization and even the religious sphere.

The Early Bronze Age
1800–1500 BC

The funerary milieu of this period in the Alcores region is distinguishable from that of other sites in western Andalusia. Three shaft tombs were found in a small cave in the Ronda de San Francisco zone of the city in 1984. The archaeological data for Carmona are insufficient to provide a clear picture of the layout of the ancient village. The settlement was made on the eastern side of the present city, even though the highest and most easily defended land, by its natural configuration, was southward around Picacho. It is possible that the tombs of Ronda del León de San Francisco are the remains of the necropolis of this Early Bronze Age settlement.

Tartessian settlement in the late Bronze and the Early Iron Ages

A profound cultural transformation began in the region during the 9th–8th centuries BC.

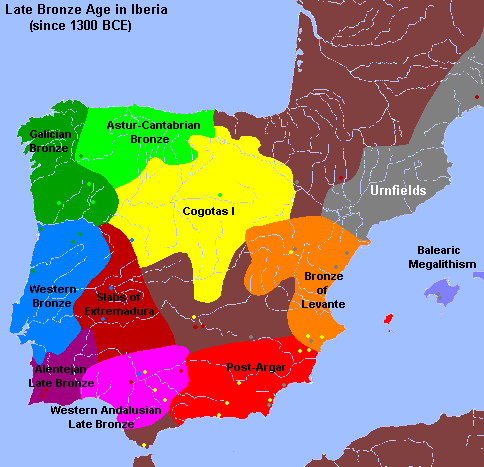
Late Bronze Age in Iberia

Small finds of ceramics have established Bronze Age occupation of the area, and by the late Iron Age this was a Tartessian settlement. From the mid-8th century BC, a stable core population had developed on the wide plateau where the current city is situated. The site was a natural fortress from which the roads leading to the Guadalquivir River and traversing the region could be controlled. Prior to the arrival of the Phoenicians, the indigenous peoples showed a preference for such strategic spots dominating the communications routes and agricultural lands.

== Phoenician trading city ==
The first indications of contact between the indigenous population and Phoenician traders are found in manufactured pottery dating from around the 8th century BC. A settlement emerged whose urban characteristics had nothing in common with contemporary groups of huts found in the surrounding countryside. Phoenician influences are evident in the remains of buildings constructed in the 7th and 6th centuries BC using Middle Eastern techniques. Evidence of innovations marking the transition from the Bronze to the Iron Age have been found there: solid houses constructed in this Middle Eastern style, Phoenician wheel-thrown pottery and iron metallurgy, as well as hand-modeled native ceramic objects. In 1988, archaeological excavations in Calle Higuera unearthed a wall 1.1 metres wide, built of mixed stones and masonry blocks in the mid-6th century BC.

Location of Tartessos

These Asian elements suggest that the Phoenician influence in Carmona was more important than has been previously understood. With the arrival of the Phoenicians, Carmona underwent a radical change. The village of huts was transformed into a city from its nucleus in the neighbourhood of present-day San Blas, probably due to the presence of a Phoenician commercial establishment in the area. The circular huts were replaced by rectangular houses, built in the Phoenician mode with internal divisions of rooms for different uses that the new society required, and arranged in a planned urban layout. The local Tartessian aristocracy exhibited its status by adopting the burial practices of the Greek and Phoenician colonists, such as at the Tartessian necropolis. The population of this proto-urban core built defences with walls of sloping masonry on its western flank, the most vulnerable, and continued to consolidate until the mid-6th century BC, when the Tyrian Phoenician trade network disintegrated.

== Turdetani period ==
Iberia before Carthaginian conquests 300 BC

The collapse of the Phoenician trade network precipitated the end of the Tartessian civilisation, and began a period still not well understood by modern historical archaeology. Many Tartessian settlements were in crisis—some were reduced in size, some disappeared, and in others there is evidence of fires of such intensity they would have caused widespread destruction.

Carmona, however, seems not to have suffered this crisis, or at least it was quickly overcome. The Turdetani city still occupied the same delimited area the Tartessian settlement had during its period of orientalisation, adopting the same urban configuration and expanding from the 5th century BC to occupy the space next to the defensive walls of the late 8th century BC. The Turdetani settlement was built directly over the old Tartessian town in the San Blas zone of modern-day Carmona, even keeping the same alignment (as in the case of the Saltillo house site). Further south, in the expansion area of the city, the new layout had a different orientation than in the northern zone, coinciding with the later Roman plan.

The foundations and walls of structures were made of masonry blocks cut from local rock quarries, the walls being plastered and painted red or white. The floors were similar to those of the colonial city—made of rammed earth, small boulders, or limestone slabs.

The strategic situation of the city near the territory's wealth of natural resources allowed a quick recovery from the economic crisis.

== Carthaginian rule ==
Carthaginian conquests in Iberia 237–206 BC

The conquest of the Iberian Peninsula in 237 BC by Punic Carthaginians under the command of Hamilcar Barca began a turbulent era which culminated in the Second Punic War and the Roman conquest. The Carthaginians colonised the original permanent Turdetanian-Phoenician settlement in the present-day San Blas neighbourhood, retaining the original urban layout and extending the expansion of the city southward. The name '"Carmona" may have derived from Kar-Hammon, the "city of Hammon" or Baal-Hammon, the sun-god worshipped in Carthage. Carmona became an important Carthaginian enclave, as evidenced by the significant remains of their defensive works. To strengthen the security of the place on the western flank, its weakest, they built a wall defended by a complex of trenches dug in the rock in v- section.

The Carthaginians also reinforced the bastion that defended the main access to the city at the Puerta de Sevilla, and created an imposing structure built of bossed ashlar blocks (sillares almohadillados), which today is part of the Alcázar de la Puerta de Sevilla. This turned the city into the impregnable fortress that impressed Julius Caesar.

The prosecution of the war was not favorable to the Punic troops, and in 206 BC the Carthaginians were expelled from the Iberian Peninsula, as described in Appian's History of Spain. The decisive battle took place at Ilipa, (now the city of Alcalá del Río), the main centre of Punic Turdetania. The Roman victory decided the fate of Spain.

== Roman conquest ==
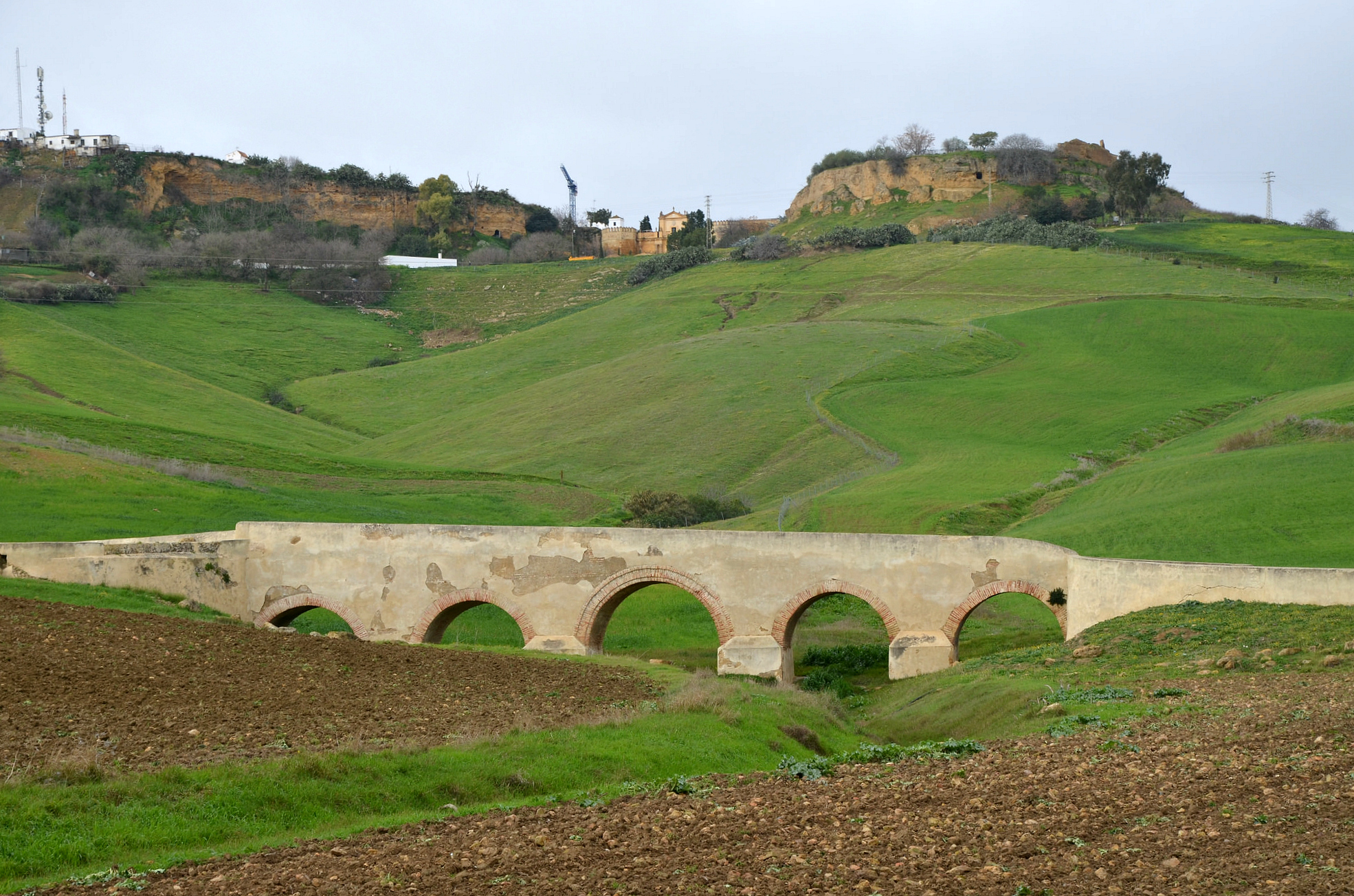
Roman bridge of Carmo

Various ethnic groups occupied southern Andalusia when the Roman armies arrived: Hispanic-Punic communities, Bastetanians, Carthaginians, Celtici and Turdetanians. Although the Carthaginians controlled the region of Carmona politically and militarily, most of the population appears to have been Turdetani, a non-Iberian people who appeared at the end of the Atlantic Bronze Age. They had settled in the area around the 9th century BC, and maintained their ancient cultural traditions until the Phoenicians traders settled there and introduced many innovations in urban layout and architecture, metallurgy, manufacture of pottery, and agricultural practices, all of which the Turdetani adopted. However, they rejected the Phoenician ideological influences in language, sociopolitical structure, and religion.

After the Roman conquest, Carmona, like the rest of Hispania, began the slow process of Romanisation of its culture—social, economic, and religious—affecting language and urban development as well. During the rule of the Roman Republic, Carmona, called Carmo by the Romans, maintained the same urban structure as in the Turdetani and Punic periods, with minor modifications perceptible in the evidence from archaeological digs. The data from these excavations have documented a potters' complex located on the slopes of Albollón, outside the city walls. During the 2nd and 1st centuries BC, the spatial arrangement of housing was transformed with the move towards a more complex economic and social structure. A new conception of urban housing developed: structures were built with walls and foundations made of stone and adobe bricks, maintaining the same orientation as in the Turdetani era. The choice of materials and construction techniques used by the Hispano-Romans helped preserve their strong cultural ties to indigenous traditions. New buildings sometimes were built on the foundations of older Turdetani structures, although the rooms were larger.

The cultural effects of Romanisation became more evident at the end of the period, with the rise of the Roman Empire. The ancient historians Polybius and Titus Livius claimed that before the Roman conquest, many kings and minor rulers had governed the area that today is western Andalusia, an assertion finally corroborated by the investigations of the modern historian Julio Caro Baroja.

Of Turdetania, Strabo (64–63 BC–24 BC) wrote in his Geography : "Wheat, wine and oil are exported from Turdetania and there are many good salting plants ... The people are known to be very cultured; they have their own grammar, poetry and laws in verse ... They also make bread from dried acorns that can be stored for a long time ...".

== Roman Empire ==
In the second half of the 1st century, with the social stability brought by the Pax Romana, Carmo became a major crossroads on the Via Augusta and an important outpost in the Roman empire. A period of economic prosperity based on agricultural production and long-distance trade began, as evidenced by the findings of amphorae from Andalusia in the Monte Testaccio of Rome, and by the volume of Gallic ceramics documented in local excavations. The city was issued the imperial dispensation to mint a coinage bearing the name "Carmo"; its "mighty wall" was mentioned by Julius Caesar in his De Bello Civile (Caes., BCiv. 2.19.4). The city was part of the Legal Convent of Asitigitana (Écija), and was granted the status of civium Romanorum, its inhabitants being assigned to the rural tribe Galeria. Intensive construction in the city soon led to urban sprawl, resulting in a physical dichotomy with the old city to the north, and the new to the south.

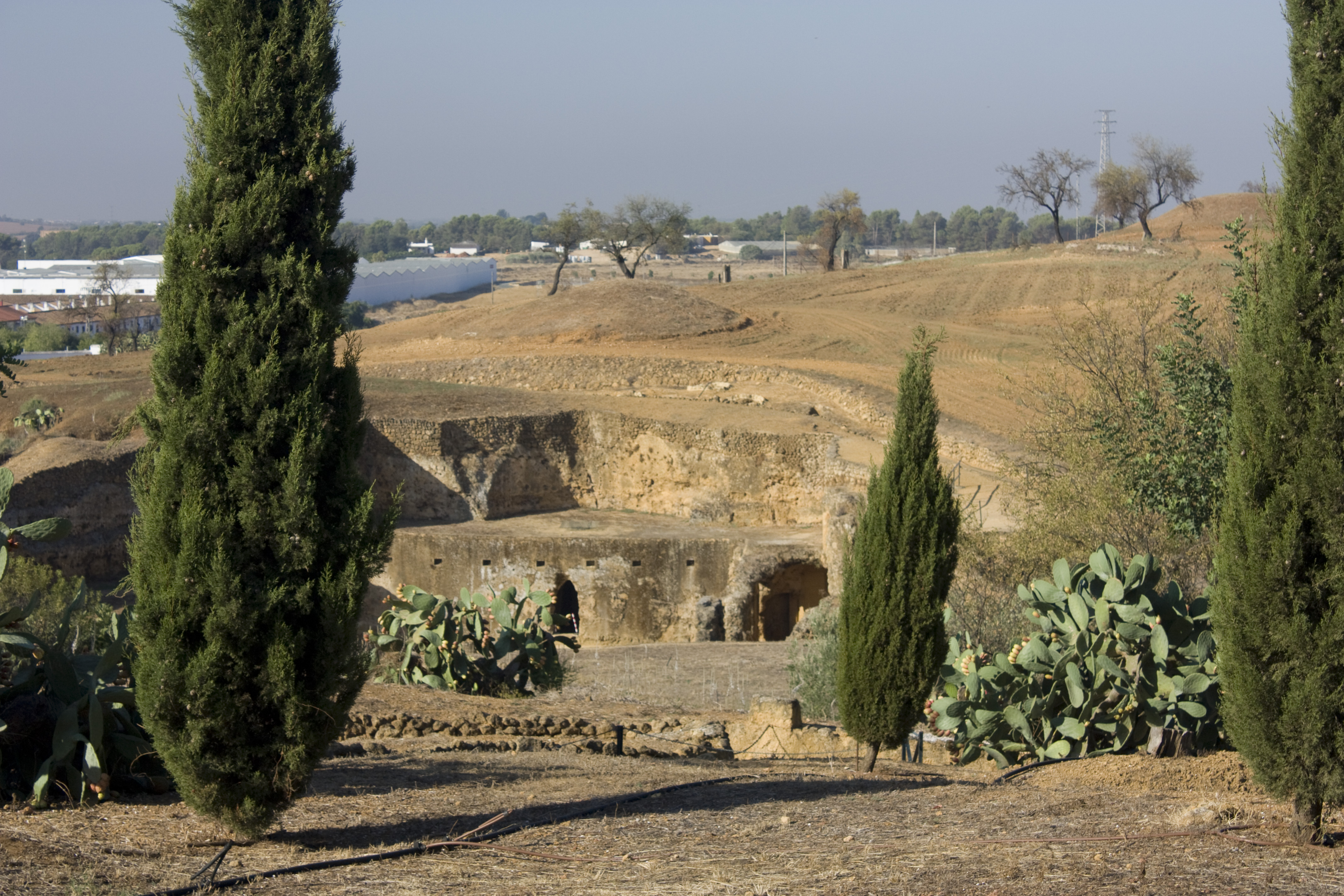
Roman necropolis of Carmona, tumulus (2011)

There were major urban innovations with the building of new roads and the consolidation of infrastructure as Carmona adopted a radically different layout plan in the town centre. The Decumanus Maximus, the main road on the east-west axis, and the Cardo Maximus, the main road on the north-south axis, were formative elements of the new urban structure, as was the Forum at their intersection. Economic development during the Flavian rule enabled population growth throughout the 1st century AD, so that the city expanded into less populated areas of the plateau, southward and eastward, occupying what is now the barrio of San Felipe. Roman architectural and urban design concepts were more faithfully respected in this expansion, as construction was not constricted by previous development. New streets were laid out on a grid plan along the Decumanus Maximus.

Features of the transformed urban scheme included the city walls and gates, new streets, the forum, buildings for public entertainment like the amphitheatre, the public baths, industrial areas, private homes and cemeteries.

Roman Carmo's early remains are buried in the area extending from the present Ayuntamiento to the Plaza de Abastos, where a late neolithic dolmen was discovered in 1888. Some graves from the Carthaginian period dating to the 5th century have been found as well. The name of a certain Urbanibal, a person of Carthaginian descent who lived during the Roman period, is preserved on a funeral urn discovered in the Roman cemetery and now displayed in the Carmona City Museum (Museo de la Ciudad de Carmona). The bodies were cremated in crematories excavated in the rock, where the funeral pyre stood. Sometimes these crematories were also used for burials; the ashes were deposited in them, then they were covered with stone blocks, bricks, and tegulae. A stele was placed to indicate their location and the name of the deceased.

The collective mausoleum formed by an underground familial chamber is the most common in the necropolis. The tombs were plastered and decorated to hide the coarseness of the rock. The cemetery is one of the sites in the Iberian peninsula with the highest number of paintings. Most of the decorations were simple, with geometric and figurative floral themes, often in the form of garlands framing niches or separating panels. Sometimes, as in the tomb of Postumius, they have a complicated design filled with various geometric motifs, and even include the signature of the painter.

=== City wall and its gates ===
Carmona sits in an easily defended strategic location on a high plateau nearly impassable by armies because of the steepness of its slopes. The Romans reinforced these natural impediments with a wall and fortified gates, encompassing the entire perimeter. Julius Caesar famously wrote in his "Commentary on the Civil War" (Commentarii de bello civili): "Carmonenses, quae est longe firmissima totius provinciae civitas" (Carmona is by far the strongest city of the province). Today, nothing remains of those imposing defences except the Seville and Cordoba Gates and the foundations of a stretch of wall in the Raso de Santa Ana. The walled enclosure likely followed the course of the medieval walls that remain today, with few deviations, except in the areas of Arbollón and Cenicero, where the layout was changed as the two valleys silted in during the Roman imperial era. On a site excavated in the Ronda del Cenicero, the medieval wall had been raised on the remains of another built in the late Roman period. This in turn had been built on Roman ruins over sedimentation in the Valley of the Cenicero, indicating that the course of the imperial wall lay further inland.

In the "Arbollón" (a natural stream bed at the northeast foot of the hill where the original oppidum lay) section of the city, an archaeological excavation conducted in 1989 documented the existence of a valley that had silted in during the Roman period, in the latter 1st century. The defensive walls would be located within this depression; the boundaries should coincide approximately with those of the triangular block bounded by the Convento de las Descalzas (Convent of the Barefoot Nuns) and the plaza of the same name.

There were four gates where the axes of the two main roads of the city met the enclosure walls. The Seville and the Cordoba gates marked the western and eastern ends of the Cardo Maximus, while the Moron and Postigo gates stood at the north and south ends, respectively, of the Decumanus Maximus, which corresponds to the present-day Calle Prim.

Seville gate (Puerta de Sevilla)

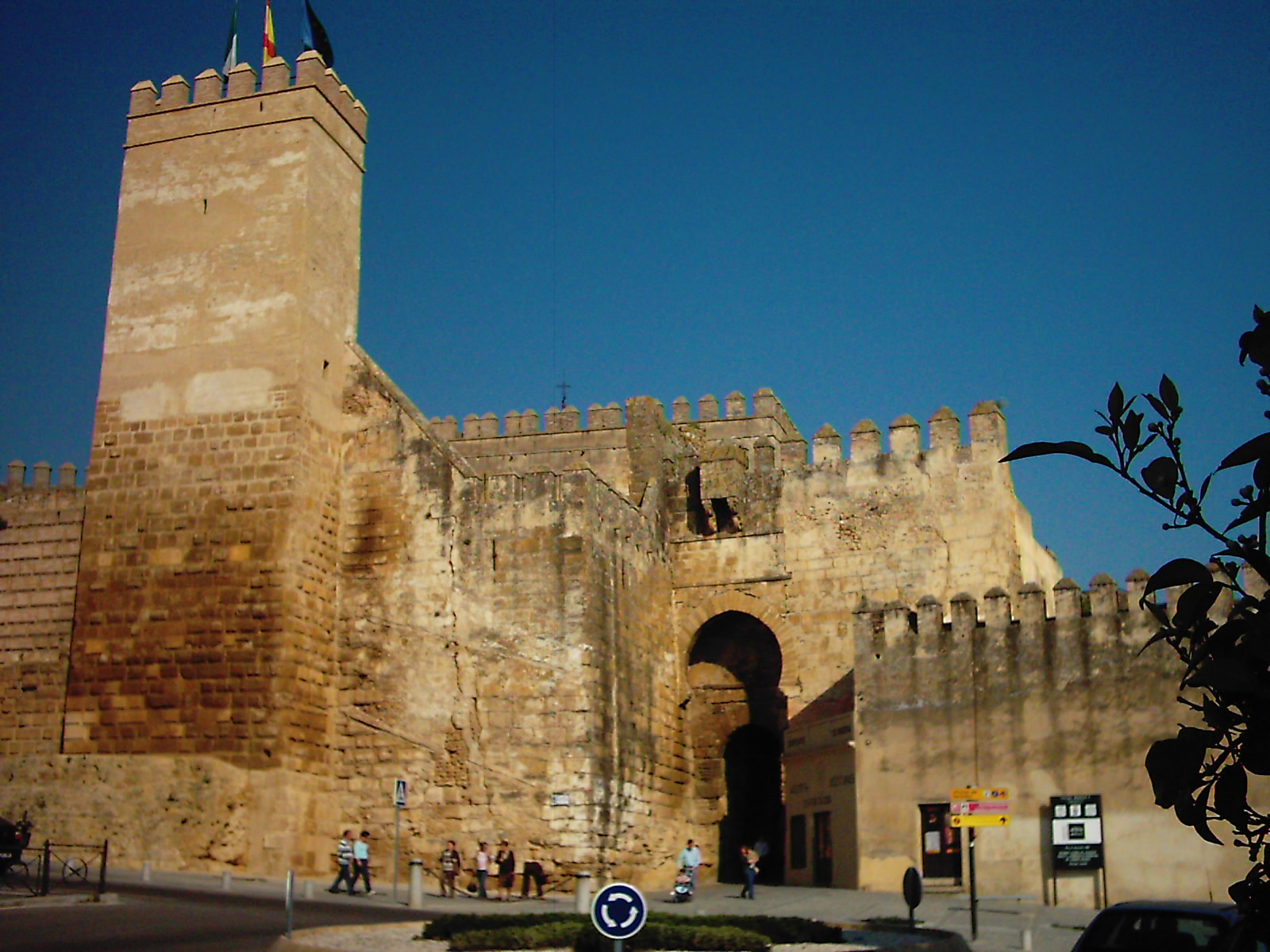
Alcázar of the Puerta de Sevilla

The Seville gate and its bastion were built by the Carthaginians before the Second Punic War, probably dating from 220 to 230 BC. The Romans later made several modifications, focusing on reconstruction of the gate which allowed access to the walled town, and the sally port, located slightly north of the stronghold. They also made several changes to the bastion itself, which, like the gate, still exists. The Seville gate consists of two vaulted spaces framed by two arches above a courtyard forming an intervallum (a clearing between the walls and the city), while the sally port is made up of two arches that frame a space covered with a barrel vault. Both works date from the first half of the 1st century BC. In the bastion of the stronghold, major Roman additions included the construction of a curtain wall, or facing, called a cortina, which augmented the structure's height, and a temple built in the second half of the 1st century BC of which the only remains are the podium on which it stood.

Cordoba gate (Puerta de Córdoba)

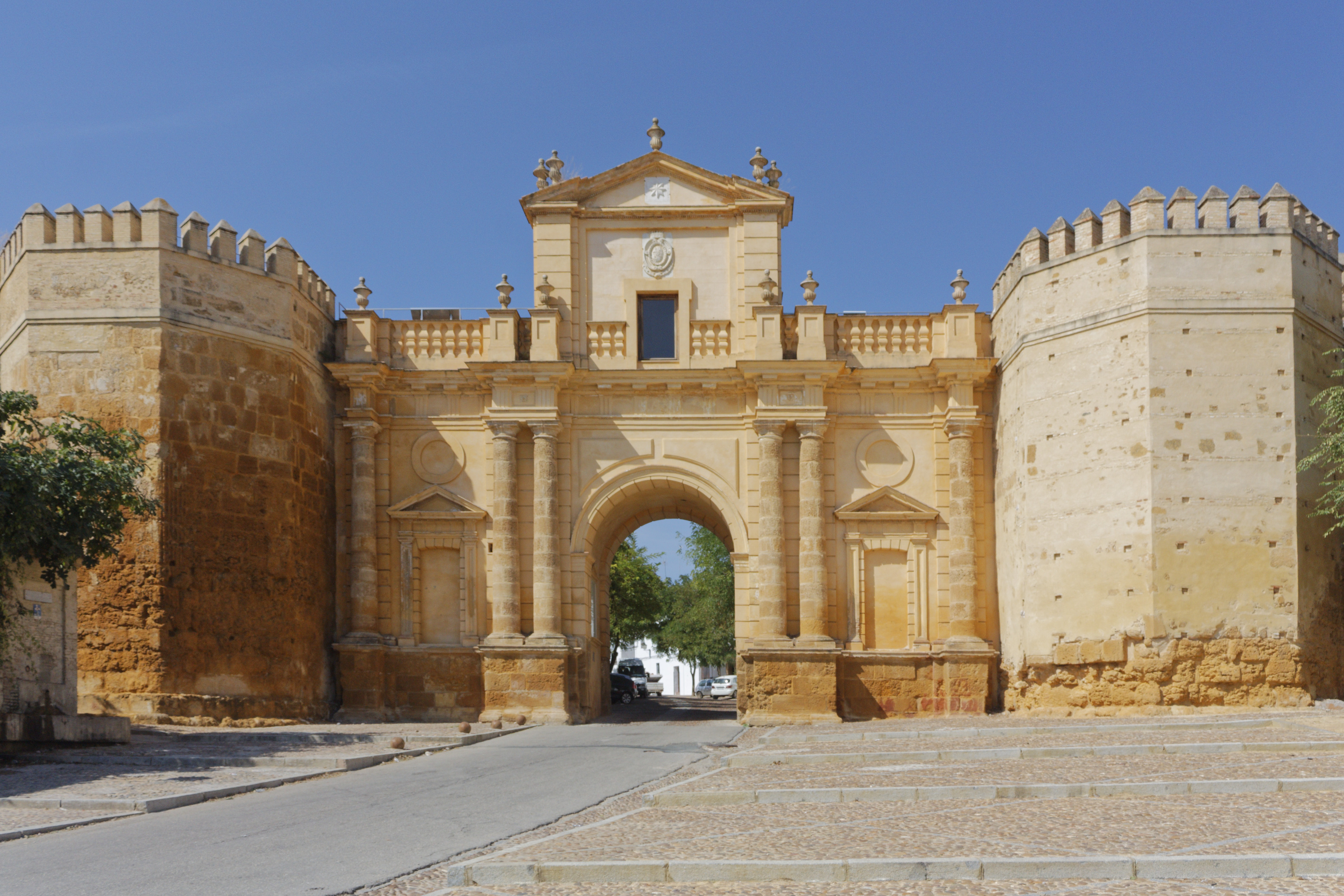
Puerta de Córdoba

The current Córdoba Gate is the result of various renovations to the original Roman gate and to the still extant wall ascending the adjacent hill. It has three columns with Corinthian capitals set on each side of the entranceway and configured in the classical manner, standing on an Attic base without a plinth on a double socle; they are flanked by two semi-octagonal watchtowers. The parallel architecture dates the works to the reign of Augustus or Tiberius. The north tower was rebuilt after being destroyed in the earthquake of 1504. The current appearance of the gate is due to the intervention of the architect José Carmona of Echamorro, 1786–1800.

Sedia gate (Puerta de La Sedia)

In 1986, a section of wall was uncovered in a plot on Calle Torre del Oro which included the remains of an ancient gate with at least two arches of different sizes. Considering the wall's relationship to the city plan and the grid street pattern, a major Roman gate would be expected in this area. Archaeologists participating in the excavations believe this was the outlet leading northwest from the Decumnaus to the present Lora del Rio road.

Moron gate (Puerta de Moron)

Topographically the gate was situated close to the slope of San Mateo, leading to the ancient "Little Old Road". Ashlar stone blocks laid without mortar, of a type similar to those of the Puerta de Córdoba, were discovered in a trench dug for work on the modern-day public water supply.

=== Cardo Maximus and Decumanus Maximus ===
The Roman urban plan was based on a layout of streets forming a symmetrical grid, with those that ran northwest-southeast and northeast-southwest intersecting the two main axes of the city, the Cardo Maximus and the Decumanus Maximus. The streets were paved with large irregular slabs of slate, with the sewers flowing beneath them.

The Cardo Maximus actually corresponded to the urban course of the Via Augusta. Its layout has been preserved in the current plan, running from the Sevilla Gate to the Córdoba Gate, as shown by the discovery of part of the ancient road at the current site of Calle Prim and Plaza de Arriba.

The upper Decumanus started at the Moron Gate and followed a path still not well defined as of 2012, crossing the current Plaza de Arriba to the northwest gate near the Postigo.

=== Forum ===
The Forum was the civic, administrative, religious and economic centre of the city. It contained the main temples, the Basilica, the Curia, and the macellum, or market—all public life revolved around the forum.

Carmona's forum was located, as customary in Roman-built cities, at the junction of the Cardo Maximus and the Decumanus Maximus, in what is now the Plaza de Arriba, which has persisted over time as a public centre of the city. There is little archaeological data to indicate the forum's exact structural details. At an excavation site on the Plaza de San Fernando, the remains of a large building dating to the 1st century indicate it was an edifice with a public function. Its plan corresponds to the layout of a Roman forum, and so far a porticoed walkway and a macellum have been exposed. There are also remains of another building made of hewn stone ashlar blocks in the Convent of Madre de Dios that shows features suggesting a building with a civic use.

Part of the fluted shaft of a Roman column with an Attic base, made of white marble, 0.45 metres (18 in) high and 1.3 metres (51 in) in diameter at its lower end, has recently been unearthed in the area of the forum on a lot in Calle Antonio Quintanilla next to a section of a stone block wall. It appears to belong to a building of great magnitude near the forum; it may have been a basilica or temple. These elements relate closely to those existing since ancient times in the neighboring house. Several fragments of a shaft and a Corinthian capital decorated with acanthus leaves were found in the same street.

=== Amphitheatre and Theatre ===
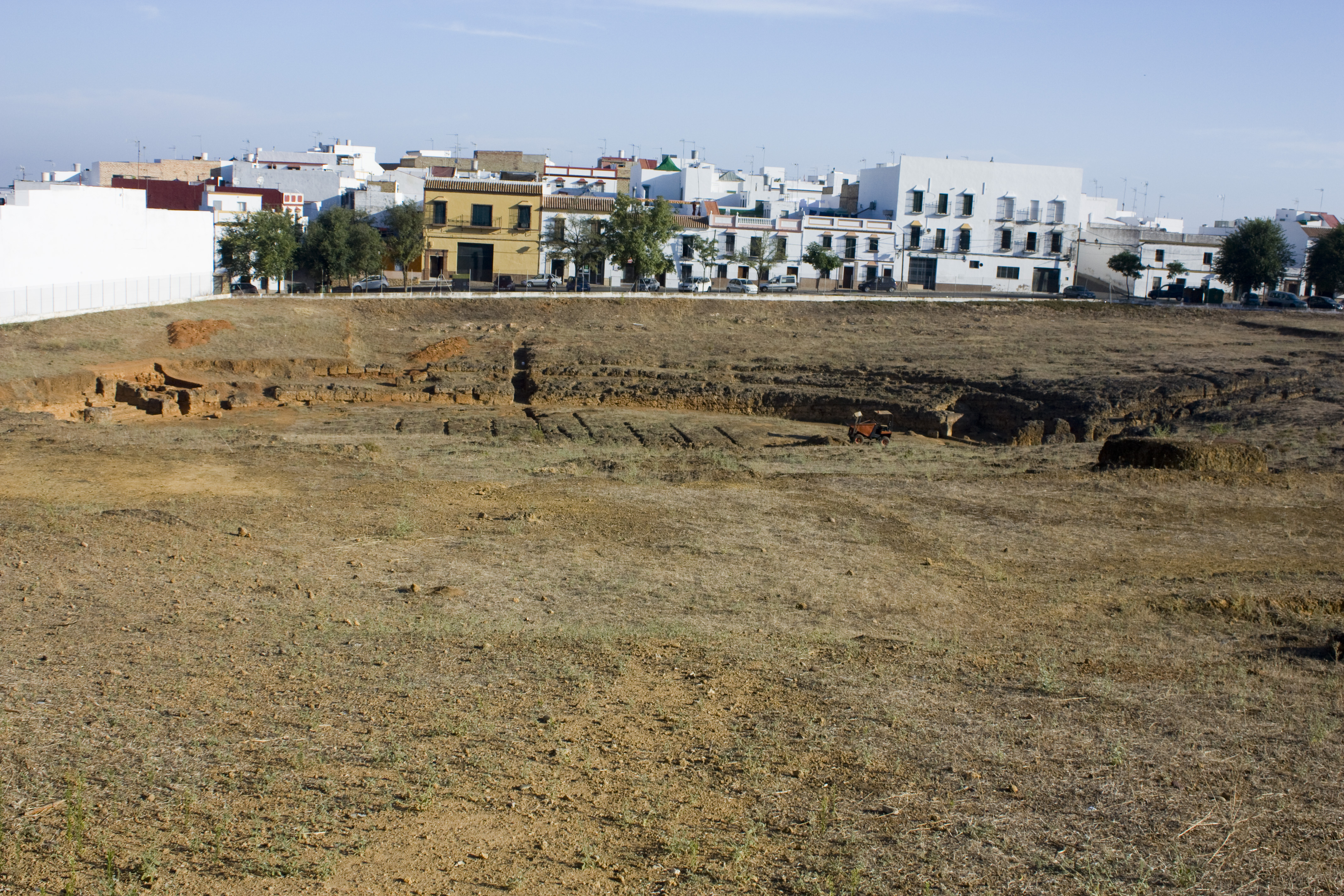
Excavation of the Roman amphitheatre (2011)

The amphitheatre was located opposite the Necropolis, near the Via Augusta; George Bonsor and Juan Fernández López began to excavate it in 1885. The amphitheater arena has survived, as well as the ima cavea (the first row of bleachers, for the senatorial and equestrian classes) and the media cavea (for the middle classes) which were carved into the rock, while the summa, the only freestanding part of the grandstand built, has disappeared. The arena measures 55 m in its longer axis and 39m in the shorter.

The existence of a Roman theatre in Carmona has been debated for many years. Bonsor thought the amphitheatre served the functions of both. However, in 1995, an impressive section of a block wall for the foundation of a building of great magnitude was exposed in General Freire Street. Certain features, such as its structural characteristics, size, location in the city, and the topography, suggest the presence of a theatre, though this is still hypothetical as of 2012.

=== Public Baths ===
Tradition places a Roman public baths facility near the present Iglesia de San Bartolomé (Church of St. Bartholomew). Recent excavations at a site under the street Calle Pozo Nuevo in the San Felipe barrio uncovered the water heating system of what appear to be the public baths of Carmona, dating to the 2nd century, as well as part of what is either the pool (piscina) of a bath-house or a very large water cistern (nymphaeum). These structures, which faced the sun, and the cisterns that supplied them, are being documented and studied in the archaeological conservation process. In 1923 a Roman mosaic with images of the Gorgon Medusa at its centre, and goddesses representing the four seasons in each corner, was discovered here. The mosaic has been moved and is now preserved in the central courtyard of the City Hall.

=== Housing ===
The typical Roman villa in Carmona was composed of various buildings—the culina (kitchen), triclinia (dining rooms), cubicula (bedrooms), and baths—distributed around a courtyard or atrium. Their terra cotta tiled roofs discharged rain water into an atrium where it was collected in a pool, the impluvium. Once decanted, the water was stored in underground cisterns that assured a constant supply for a household in the absence of access to a regional aqueduct. These tanks consisted of a cylindrical well dug in the ground which opened into a variable number of tunnels in order to increase its capacity, which in some cases was above 40 m^{3}. The entire structure was made impermeable with a mortar of lime and ceramic fragments called opus signinum.

As of 2012, it has not been possible to excavate a complete house, although partial remains have revealed many structural elements of the typical dwelling. The foundations are usually of masonry, the walls are of either hewn stone, ashlar blocks, or brickwork, cemented with lime mortar and later painted with geometric or figurative motifs. The most common colors are white and red, and to a lesser extent blue, green or ocher. The most common type of floor pavement is opus signinum or brick; more rarely mosaics and marble slabs were used.

=== Artisanal area ===
The artisanal area, mainly for the production of pottery, stood outside the city walls as required by Roman law, on both sides of the road. An extension of the Decumanus Maximumus started from the gate located near the Postigo and led to Axati, now Lora del Rio. In various archaeological excavations in the area several ceramic kilns and remains of ancillary facilities have been unearthed. The furnaces were circular, built of mud bricks and made up of two main parts: the combustion chamber and an upper chamber where the pots were placed for firing. The combustion chamber, or furnium, was dug in the ground and had a central pillar which served to hold the grille. It was accessed through a passageway, or praefurnium, also dug in the ground. The grille was placed above the furnium at the height of the surface; this was an adobe platform with multiple perforations allowing the heat generated in the furnace to reach the firing chamber covered by a dome.

=== Roman necropolis and other cemeteries ===
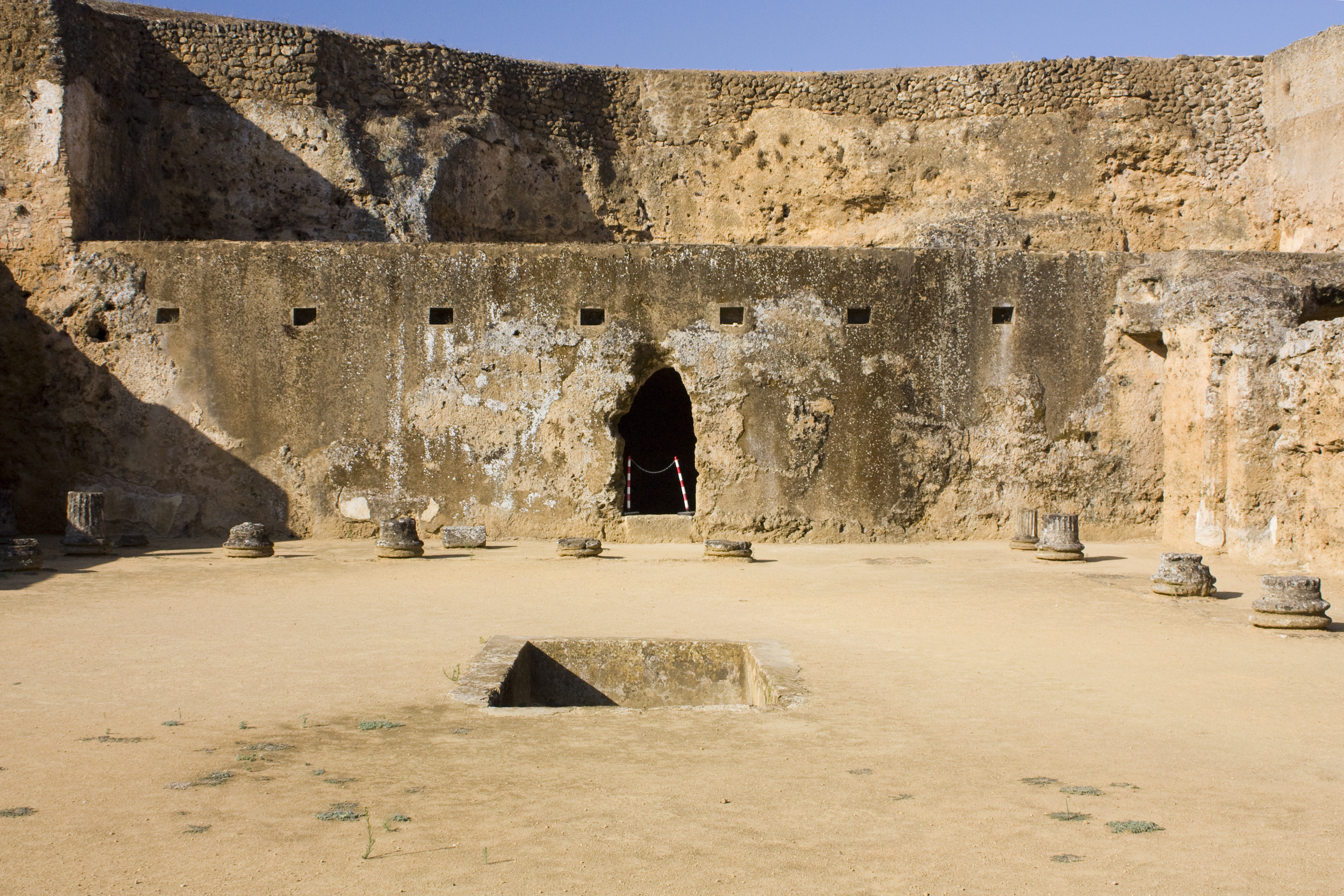
Temple of Servilia at the Roman Necropolis

During the 1st and 2nd centuries, high-ranking citizens were customarily buried outside the city walls, in specially constructed tombs on the sites of earlier burial grounds. These cemeteries were located usually on either side of the main roads radiating from the city centre. The Roman necropolis, the largest cemetery in Carmo, was located along the shoulders of the Via Augusta going towards Hispalis (Seville). It consists of ancient Tartessian funerary monuments and Roman tombs, which all shared one trait: the bodies of the dead were buried in a bent position, always with their heads facing westward. Cremation became common at the end of the 1st century. The "Tomb of the Elephant" is a large and roughly square enclosure (10.6 by 12.5 metres) with three dining rooms and a kitchen cut deep into the living rock.

The Tomb of Servilia was the most monumental tomb of the Carmona necropolis. It was built to resemble a complete Roman villa and had a courtyard surrounded by porticos of colonnaded arches. These were lined with statues, many of which have been recovered by archaeologists and are now in the Carmona City Museum and the Museo Arqueológico of Seville. The Tomb of Servilia served not only as a burial place for an influential patrician family with its columbarium and large circular mausoleum, but also as a conspicuous display of their wealth.

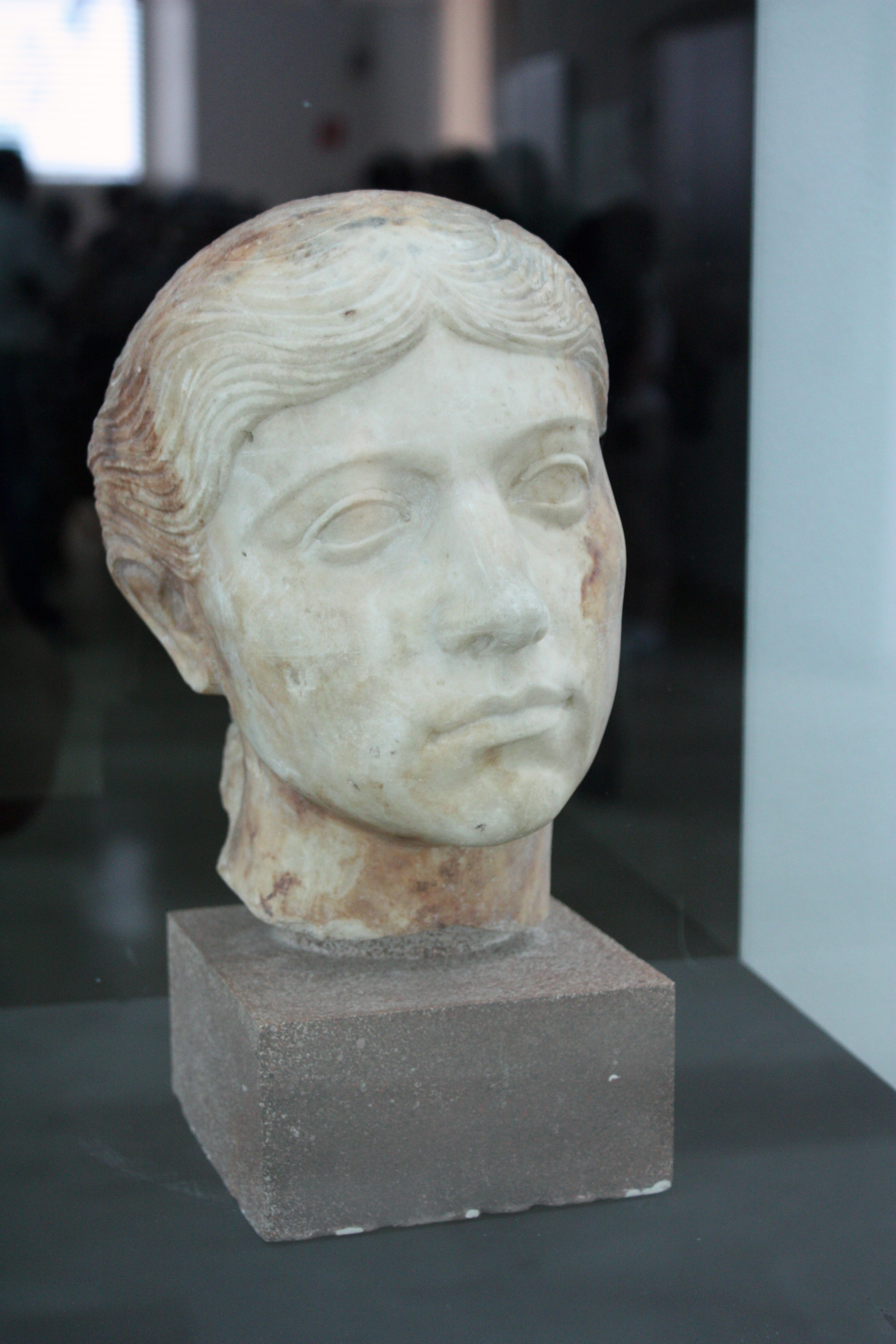
Head of statue of Servilia

In 1881 George Bonsor and Juan Fernández López purchased two plots of land containing old quarries and olive groves, situated a short distance west of Carmona, and commenced excavations. On the site were some curiously shaped mounds which they later found to be tumuli of prehistoric age. Around these mounds the Romans had for centuries hewn small chambers out of the rock to serve as familial tombs. These were from four to five metres square and two metres high. In the walls were niches for cinerary urns, each of which generally contained, beside the ashes of the dead, numerous domestic items including a coin, a mirror, and a signet ring.

The walls were mostly painted in fresco or distemper in Pompeian style, with representations of birds, dolphins, and wreaths of flowers. Near the entrance of each tomb was the crematorium, also hewn out of the rock, on the sides of all of which signs of fire are still visible. The tombs were clustered in groups, some around the tumuli, some near the Roman quarries, and on both sides of the Roman roads, two of which ran from Carmona to Seville through the necropolis.

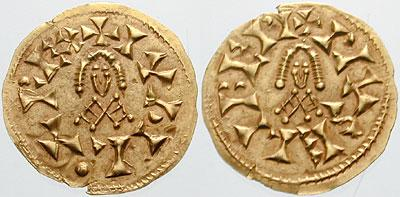
Gold coin issued during reign of Visigothic king Iudila, found near Carmona

The most important discoveries were made near the Roman roads at the Tomb of Servilia: a columbarium and three large triclinia for the funeral banquets. In addition to these was an altar, a tomb with cinerary urns, a kitchen, a bath, a well, and a sanctuary containing a marble statue of its namesake. In 1885, about 50 metres from the triclinia, Bonsor and Fernández discovered a Roman amphitheatre, also hewn out of the rock. During the course of the excavations, over 3000 objects of interest were found, among which were many inscriptions, fragments of statues, coins, and other valuable articles; all of them were placed in the Archaeological Museum of Carmona, founded and operated by the two men.

..."The most important discoveries have been made near the Roman roads—namely, a columbarium and three large triclinia for the funeral banquets... In addition to these, there is an altar, a tomb with its cinerary urns, a kitchen, a bath, a well, and a sanctuary, in which is a stone statue. Last year, about 50 yards from this triclinium, we discovered a Roman amphitheatre, also hewn out of the rock. During the course of the excavations, numerous objects of interest were found, amounting to over 3,000 in number, among which are many inscriptions, fragments of statues, glass, marble, and earthenware urns, lamps and mirrors, rings and coins, and other valuable articles, all of which have been placed in a museum in the town specially arranged for them. The excavations are still being continued."

Other less monumental burial grounds have been identified on an extension of the road to Axati, and some findings suggest the existence of cemeteries near the Puerta de Morón and the Alcázar de Arriba.

George Bonsor also recovered a large variety of materials at the necropolis of the La Cruz del Negro, including engraved scarabs, ivory combs, lamps, vases and burnished handmade bowls. Phoenician pottery constitutes a high proportion of the most notable pieces in these hoards, a typical characteristic of a Tartessian necropolis. The number of imported Phoenician objects found at La Cruz del Negro indicates a sizable part of the local population was affluent enough to buy these objects. The necropolis of La Cruz del Negro may have had a relationship to the important tumuli of Carmona, one of the Tartessian urban cores which benefited most from trade with the Phoenicians of the coast. During the orientalizing period of the 7th and 6th centuries BC, the most characteristic burial in the valley of the lower Guadalquivir was entombment or cremation under a mound. The Tartessian burial mounds seem to perpetuate earlier Bronze Age burial practices.

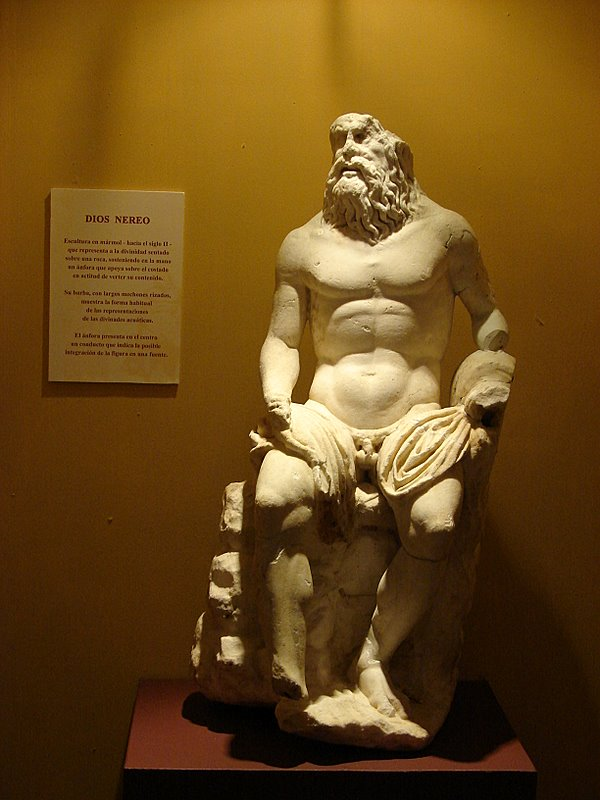
Statue of the god Nereo from the Roman necropolis

Much of the Roman necropolis has been preserved, and more than six hundred family tombs dating from the 2nd century BC to the 4th century AD have survived. Enclosed in subterranean chambers hewn from the living rock, the tombs are often frescoed and contain columbarium niches in which many of the limestone funerary urns remain intact; these are frequently inscribed in Latin with the name of the deceased. Some of the larger tombs have vestibules lined with stone benches for funeral banquets and several retain the carved family emblems. The partly excavated amphitheatre of Carmo, dedicated to public spectacle in its day, is adjacent to the necropolis.

=== Late Roman and Visigothic era ===
Provinces of Visigothic Spain in the 7th century

After the 3rd century, Roman Carmona was in crisis, and an economic transformation occurred with the ruralisation of its society. The city contracted in size and some of the areas occupied during the expansion were depopulated. It then entered a recessionary period of scaled-down planning, indicated by archaeological evidence of the reuse of existing structures with slight modifications. Because of this architectural repurposing and the destruction of most traces of it in later works, archaeological data from the period are rare. Clear evidence of occupation has only been detected in the central area associated with the forum, on a plot which was transformed and reused, possibly for private purposes, and in a few other places on the main road. There is a polychrome mosaic datable to the 3rd century in the Monte office, in Prim Street. Apart from these, and the reuse of a column in the construction of the mosque, now St. Mary's Church, as well as two early Christian burials discovered in the Puerta de Sevilla, remains from the late Roman and Visigothic city are scarce.

The location of the Visigothic necropolis is unknown, although some isolated findings seem to place it around the Calle Real.

== Muslim Qarmūnâ ==
Reconstruction of the Muslim history of Carmona is difficult because of the scarcity of written texts and the general nature of the contents of those that do exist, and the natural bias of archaeological documentation, since the roomed log structures common to the period were only rarely preserved.

Overall, the city shared the history of the rest of Al-Andalus. There is evidence that it was one of the first conquests undertaken by the Arab Tariq ibn Ziyad after his landing in Spain in 711. The Muslim general Musa bin Nusayr was dispatched by the Umayyad caliph, Al-Walid, in 712 to take Carmona. Once installed, the Muslims retained the old name of the city, adapted to their pronunciation: Qarmūnâ (قرمونة).

Extrapolating from similar situations, it is likely there was a signing of a treaty or capitulation to regulate the relationship between the Hispano-Visigothic population and the Muslim newcomers. These agreements enabled the coexistence of the peoples of the occupied cities, allowing their residents to maintain their own laws and institutions, retain their property and practice their religion, in return for payment of a tax called the jizya (Arabic: جزية ǧizyah).

The Hispano-Visigothic ruling elite was replaced or assimilated by the new elite from north Africa as the feudalisation process that started with the end of the Roman Empire was cut short by the consolidation of the new Islamic state structure.

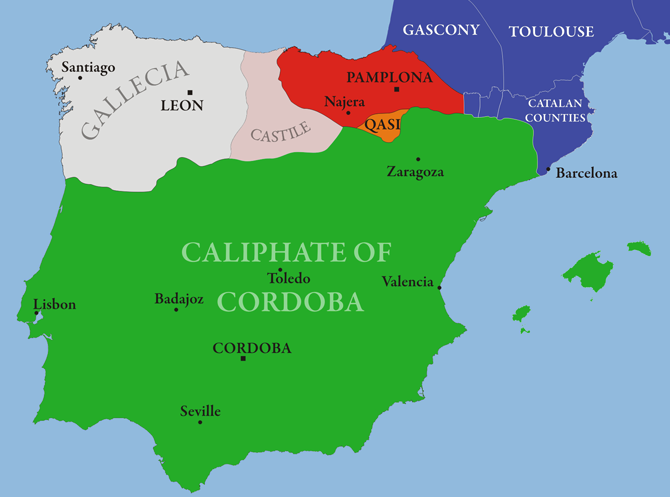
Caliphate of Córdoba in Al-Andalus

There is little specific ethnographic information to define the political situation of Qarmūnâ in this period, although there are historical references to the presence of members of the Masmuda and Sanhaja Berber tribes and of people of Arab origin. From the 8th century to the end of the Caliphate of Qurṭubah (Córdoba), Qarmūnâ was the capital of a Kūra, one of the administrative districts that made up the political structure of Al-Andalus. The Kūra of Qarmūnâ comprised all the territory bounded by Écija, Setefilla, Seville and Morón and included villages and smaller towns such as Marsana and Bardis (current Marchena and Paradas).

In 912, the first year of his rule as Emir of Córdoba, Abd ar-Rahman III took advantage of the rivalries between the Banu Hayyay lords of Išbīliya (Seville) and Qarmūnâ to force them to submit. He initially sent a special corps (hasam) under Ahmad ibn Muhammad ibn Hudayr, governor of Écija, to Seville, to obtain their submission. This attempt failed, but gained him the support of Muhammad ibn Ibrahim ibn Hayyay, lord of Qarmūnâ, and a cousin of the Sevillan lord, Ahmad ibn Maslama. When the latter was surrounded by Umayyad troops, he sued for help to Umar Ibn Hafsun, but the latter was defeated by the besiegers and returned to Bobastro. Seville finally capitulated on 20 December 913. Ibn al-Mundir al-Qurays, a member of the royal family, was named governor of the city, while the lord of Qarmūnâ obtained the title of Vizier. Muhammad ibn Ibrahim enjoyed his office for only a single day, for Abd ar-Rahman soon discovered his collusion with the rebel governor of Qarmūnâ. Muhammad was sent to prison, where he later met his death.

While there is no body of specific data presenting a coherent and comprehensive picture of the political and economic life of the city under Muslim rule, certain aspects are approachable from the existing documentation. These records provide a chronology of the Islamisation of the local population, and show that this process was already well underway in the 9th century. The differences within mixed communities were probably, at that time, less than the convergences. For example, the grammarian Maslama ibn Khattab, born in Qarmūnâ in 906, was educated in his hometown according to the cultural conventions of the Islamic world.

Location of Taifa of Carmona

The disintegration of the Caliphate into numerous principalities led Qarmūnâ to incorporate the Kūra of Ecija into its own short-lived taifa. The Taifa of Qarmūnâ was dominated from 1023 to 1042 by the Berber warlord Muhammad ibn Abd Allah, of the Zenata dynasty, who relied on the support of his tribe, the Banu Birzal, to seize power. Ibn Abd Allah managed to counter the aspirations of hegemony of the Taifa of Išbīliya until 1042, when after an armed confrontation, Qarmūnâ was integrated into the Taifa of Išbīliya ruled by the Arab Abbadid family. Thenceforth, decisions made by the emir in Išbīliya (Seville) determined the course of events in the Muslim city. In 1091, members of tribal groups from North Africa, Berbers of the Almoravid dynasty, ended the reign of the Taifa kingdoms, imposing the unification of the whole of Al-Andalus under their rule. At the same time, the Christian advance from the north resulted in frequent military incursions leaving a trail of general destruction and devastated crop fields. The Almohads brought a short period of stability (1148–1224) to the city, which was succeeded by a new era of conflict that would last until the Christian conquest in 1247.

Little is known about the layout of Qarmūnâ. Excavations provide limited data, since the only items that appear recurrently are cesspools with their waste residues; the walls and floors revealed by ancillary archaeological techniques under the modern city have been Roman. Remains of Moorish structures, public or private, are rare.

A text by the geographer Ibn Abd al-Munim al-Himyari in his geography, Kitab al-Rawd al-Mitar (The Book of the Fragrant Garden), compiled in about 1461, gives a relatively detailed description of the city and its surroundings:

It lies on the side of a mountain, surrounded by a stone wall. During periods of peace the gates in this wall are opened; they are closed during times of turmoil. Qarmūnâ is virtually impregnable on all sides of its boundaries, except for its western face: there, the height of the wall is 40 stones, equal to 43 cubits. In the west wall is a tower known as al-Burj al-Agamm [Puerta de Sevilla]; in case of war catapults are placed on its platform.

In the corner of the north wall there is another higher bastion, which is called Samarmala [Puerta de Sedia]: it is surmounted by a defensive tower and dominates the exterior above a green meadow, the grass of which never withers. Along this wall runs a very deep pit, dating from antiquity and which joins the embankment wall. A large steep rock is seen in one place on the route of the south wall; here was built a wall so high that you can barely raise your eyes to the summit: the wall is constructed above the rock, between it and the edge of the rock is enough space for the passage of a man. Some descend from there to gather honey and to get the birds in the cleft of the rock. This same south wall is pierced by a gate called Bab Yarni [Puerta de Moron], whose name comes from the nearby Yarni village.

The Qurṭubah gate [Puerta de Córdoba] is east of the wall; it is a defensive work with watchtowers. The Qalšāna gate [Puerta de Calsena] is to the northeast, and is passed on the return to Qurṭubah; the road that leads to it is easy, while the road leaving the Qurṭubah gate is difficult and steep. The al-Agamm Gate [Puerta de Sevilla] is east: a little entrance for entering Qarmūnâ. It is a second gate to the other fifty cubits.

There is one mosque in Qarmūnâ with marble columns and stone pillars; a weekly market is held every Thursday. There are public baths and an armory, which was built after the incursion of the Normans to serve as a weapons depot. Inside Qarmūnâ there are numerous ancient ruins and a stone quarry, there are also other stone quarries in the vicinity, including one on the north side.

Many of the elements mentioned in al-Himyarí's text are currently identifiable. Archaeological analysis shows that various sections of the enclosure walls were constructed with a base of reused ashlars (blocks of hewn stone) topped with tapiales, or mud walls made of earth moistened with water and rammed, dating them to the Almohad period. Regarding access to the interior of the walled city, his description of the Córdoba (Qurṭubah) Gate was confirmed by an archaeological investigation conducted in 1995. Samarmala corresponds to the already demolished Sedia Gate and the Yarni Gate to the Moron Gate. There is some confusion regarding the Calsena (Qalšāna) Gate, which, according to Alicia Jiménez would be the same as the Yarni Gate since Qalšāna was a city near present-day Arcos de la Frontera. The Puerta de Sevilla is identified with the gate the geographer calls al-Agamm.

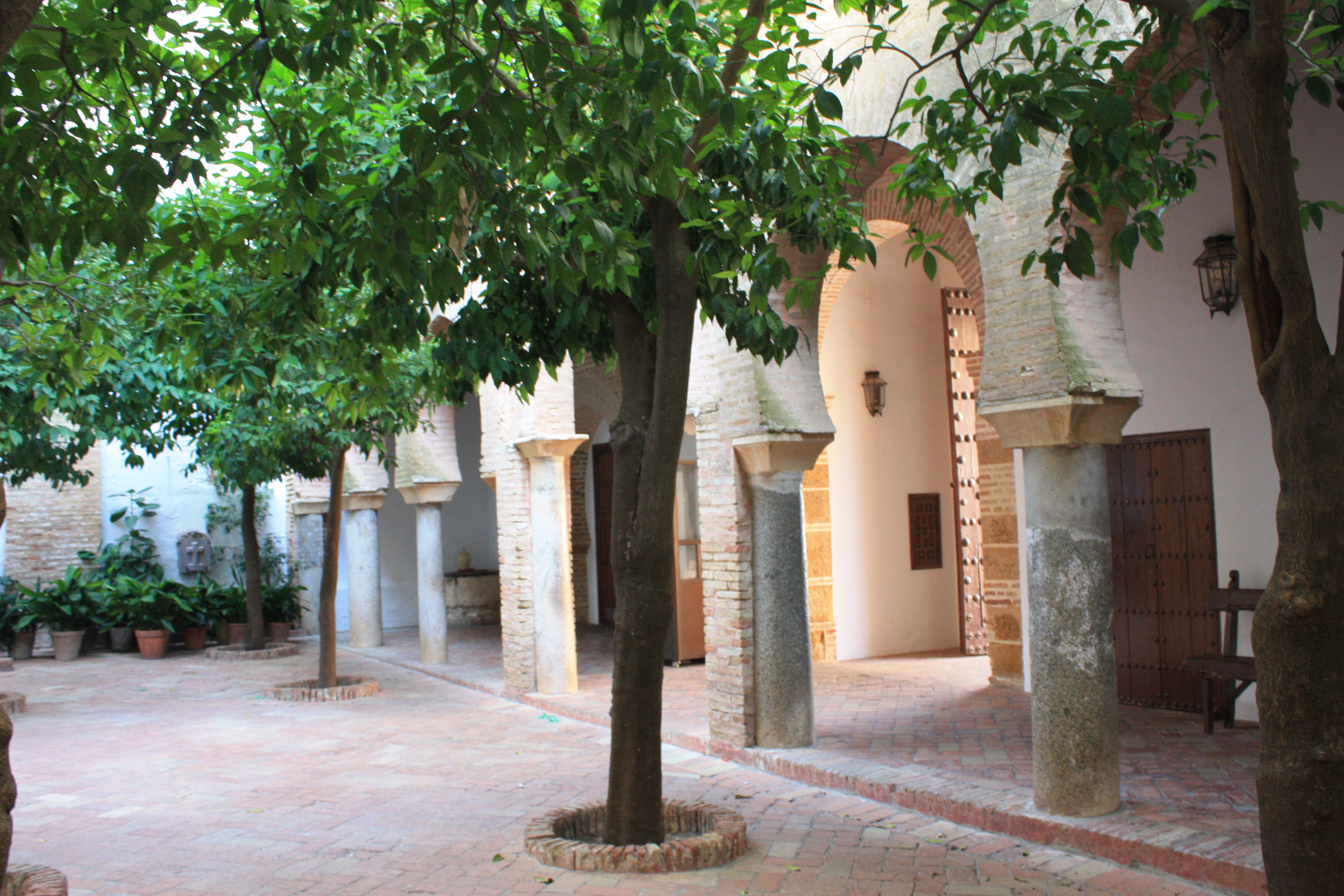
Church of Santa María de la Asunción: Patio de los Naranjos

Of the three castles in the city, at least two were in use during Islamic rule. The fortress of the al-Agamm (Alcázar de Puerta de Sevilla) underwent major changes in order to adapt the existing structures, such as raising the keep in height and the superimposition of a new arch preceding that of the Romans. The Alcázar Real (Alcázar de Arriba), preserved in its interior a palace whose typological elements allow dating it to the early 10th century.

The four Roman portals of Qarmūnâ were still in use during the Middle Ages. The Mosque was built in the 11th century, occupying the site where the church of Santa María stands now, Some of the original Islamic structure survives in the Patio de los Naranjos, a large courtyard whose typological elements date it to the period. Some of the mosque's materials and part of its minaret have been incorporated in the Priory of Santa María, perpetuating the character of the old Islamic sanctuary. It is possible there were smaller mosques, given the importance of the city, but no reliable evidence confirms this.

With the documentation available to date, it is not possible to know the exact location of the souk and the public baths, although tradition places the latter in the San Bartolomé parish. The quarries spoken of by al -Himyari are clearly recognizable today in the Cueva de la Batida.

It has been demonstrated by archaeological investigations how in this period areas that had previously been made public were reoccupied. A paradigmatic example of this phenomenon was the subdivision of the land formerly occupied by the Roman Forum for new settlement. The old Roman Cardo survived in the Islamic city, communicating with Išbīliya and the Great Mosque of Córdoba. Its route may have corresponded closely to its ancient location, which would partly explain the absence of archaeological remains of buildings, there not having been frequent re-parcelling out of plots. A new main road seems to have opened at this time to align the Seville Gate with the Moron Gate.

The varied picture presented by an approach to the historic centre of modern Carmona suggests its urban appearance during the Islamic period, with the exception that at that time there were many more vacant plots of land, especially in the area closest to the wall. An old story tells of the building of an arsenal in the city, as a defence against unexpected attacks, such as occurred in 844 when a fleet of Vikings invaded Seville. It is the only mention of industrial architecture in Qarmūnâ by historical sources. Circumstantial evidence of its possible location is the existence of two streets called Atarazana and Atarazanilla. The Muslim cemetery has not yet been located, although some isolated graves have been found in the Campo Real, far outside the city.

== Middle Ages: Carmona under the rule of the Christian Kings ==
After the Islamic conquest of the Visigothic Kingdom in 711, Carmona remained under the rule of the Moors until it was conquered by King Ferdinand III of Castile in 1247. From then it was ruled by Rodrigo González Girón, Ferdinand's chief steward. In 1630, Philip IV granted it the status of ciudad (city) in exchange for 40,000 ducats.

This period in Carmona was marked by several events: the redistribution (repartimientos), of lands and properties after the Reconquista, the city's incorporation into the administrative structure of the Kingdom of Castile, and the survival of the local Islamic way of life through those Muslims who decided to stay on in their native land.

After taking Carmona in 1247, Ferdinand III of Castile acceded to a pact that allowed Muslims to retain their properties and homes. The city was granted a charter (fuero) as a municipality to regulate its governance, and designated by the king a señorío de realengo (royal manor), making him its lord and placing it under his direct administration.

In 1252, Alfonso X began the repartimiento and the repopulation of the countryside by Christians, distributing land and homes to nobles or knights of noble lineage, knights and citizens. The king's general policy was to encourage Christian settlers who could become landowners themselves. The disadvantaged and common laborers received lots which included a home and 60 hectares (modern equivalent) of arable land in the vega.

The text of the repartimiento of Carmona is preserved in a 15th-century copy believed to be a faithful transcription of the original document. Ferdinand III's initial repartimiento overlapped that of Alfonso X, which clearly distinguished two sections, depending on the recipient of the properties distributed: donadíos (large estates) were granted when the beneficiaries were members of the royal family, the nobility, or military orders, and heredamientos (small landed properties) were granted to the settlers themselves.

The donadíos consisted of houses with large tracts of land, based on a standard establishing a "farm" (250-900 ha) as a unit; the heredamientos were significantly smaller plots. Depending on the category of the recipient, which included caballeros hidalgos (noblemen), caballeros ciudadanos (knights,) or peónes (smallholders), they received a grant more or less valuable. The orders of Santiago and Calatrava and the crown itself benefited most from this administrative process. Ferdinand divided much of the conquered territories between the knights, the Church, and the nobility, endowing them with great latifundias.

The picture that emerges from analysis of the population distribution of Carmona in this period is of a society with a Muslim majority dominated by a minority of Christians (mainly Castilian-Leonese and to a lesser extent, Aragonese and Navarrese), who controlled the administrative bodies and governmental institutions. Although the percentage of Muslims and Mudéjars dropped significantly for various reasons, including breach of the capitulations that assured their freedom, the persistence of the Muslim population has been well documented by archaeological investigation, and the material culture shows no sign of discontinuity with the period immediately before the conquest. On the contrary, ceramics, manufactories and many other elements from the period are fully within the Islamic tradition. Visible examples of this phenomenon are found in certain features preserved in some houses in the Santiago barrio and in the street Calle Ancha; these are authentic relics of the Moorish builders of the 14th century.

Alfonso X renewed the Carmona municipal statutes, with the aim of standardising juridically the territories incorporated into the Crown. He granted the city its own jurisdiction, starting from the ancient Kūra of the Islamic period and segregating only Marchena. It was an extensive territory, much larger than the current demarcation, comprising Fuentes de Andalucía, Mairena, El Viso and La Campana.

Peter I of Castile, called Pedro the Cruel

The period in Carmona following the death of Alfonso X is difficult to reconstruct due to the paucity of historical documentation that has been preserved. Carmona's strategic position was frequently compromised by raids of the Berber Banu Marin (Spanish: Benimerines), impoverishing the area as a result of the chronic insecurity. This insecurity was also aggravated by internal conflict within the Crown of Castile caused by political unrest and power struggles among the nobility. The reign of Peter I from 1350 to 1369 was inaugurated amid this negative climate (made worse in 1348 by the ravages of the Black Death), yet paradoxically ended with a positive balance of improvements to Carmona.

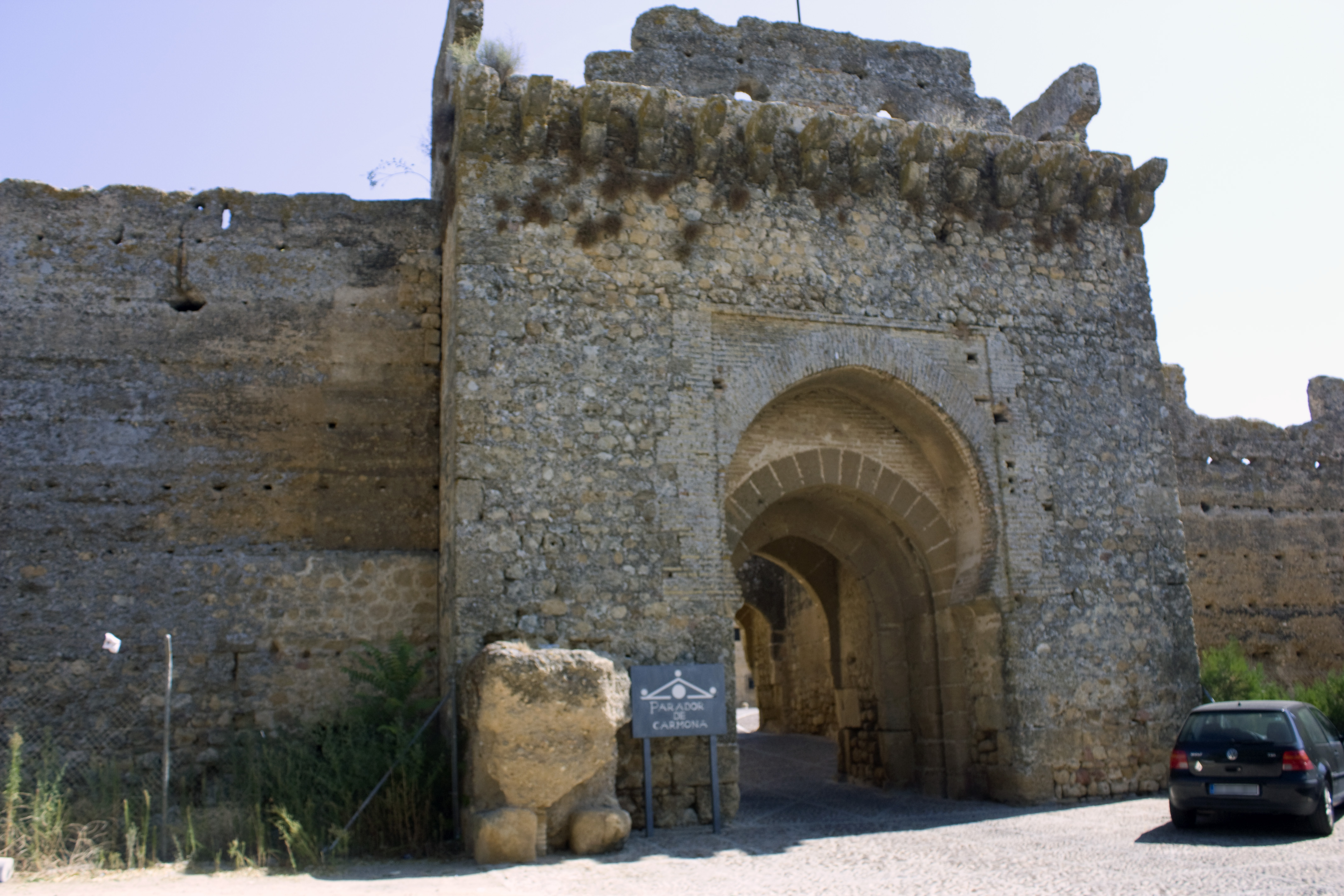
Alcázar del rey Don Pedro, Puerta de Marchena

Peter I left Carmona a legacy of several important architectural works, although some of them are in ruins today. Carmona had three castles, two defending the Seville and Cordoba gates, and a third set in the highest elevation of the city, as a last refuge to defend against an external enemy or a revolt of its own inhabitants. Peter made the decision to restore the old Muslim palace of the Real Alcázar, today called the Alcázar de Arriba (Upper Fortress) or Alcázar del rey Don Pedro, and strengthened it with a new barbican and two large square towers. He recalled the same artisans who built the Alcázar of Seville to construct its towers and exterior gate, and also to decorate the inside, thus converting the fortress into a lavish palace. He commanded another fortification, the Alcázar de la Reina, to be built across from the Puerta de Córdoba. It was partially demolished in 1501, however, with the permission of Queen Isabella.

Upon the death of the king at the hand of his illegitimate brother, Henry II of Castile, Carmona became the last bastion of Peter's partisans among the nobility, who loyally endured Henry's siege of the city until the capitulation of 1371. The palace was located next to the Puerta de Marchena, a strong enclosure with two gates, exterior and interior, and protected by several towers. This was the theatre of the siege by Henry of Trastámara against the chief steward of Peter I, Martín López de Córdoba, Grand Master of the Order of Calatrava, who was confined there with the sons and much of the treasure of Peter I. Because of this, and the fact that his mother, Eleanor of Guzman, had been imprisoned there, Henry ordered its dismantling.

Rebuilt during the reign of Henry III in the 15th century, it was then the scene of struggles between the rival houses of Arcos and Medina-Sidonia, and the object of popular hatred as it was considered the refuge of the people's oppressors. With the end of the feudal anarchy, the Catholic Monarchs allowed the demolition of the castle for a payment of 150,000 maravedíes. A mob took the fortress and demolished it in only four days and nights.

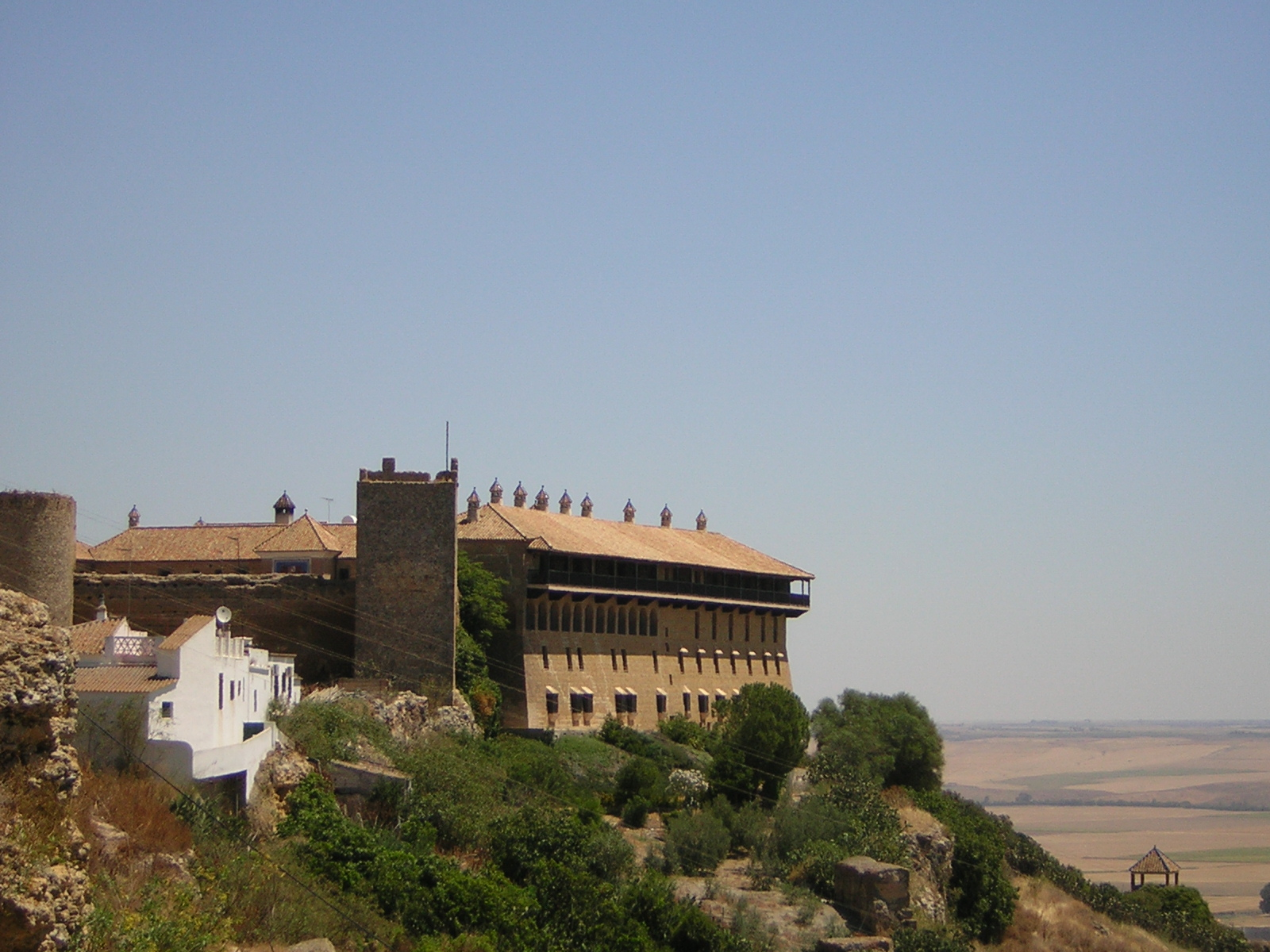
Parador on the site of the "Alcazar del Rey Don Pedro"

The earthquakes that hit Carmona in 1504 and 1755 were mainly responsible for the castle's final destruction (the epicentre of the 1504 earthquake was near Carmona, with a magnitude of about 7.0). The latter event, known as the Lisbon earthquake, caused such damage that it led to the abandonment of the alcázar, although its battlements still stand. The modern state-operated parador, "Alcazar del Rey Don Pedro", was built in the southeast section, a corner of the old Plaza de Armas (parade grounds), and opened in 1976.

The Alcázar de Abajo (Lower Fortress) or Alcázar de la Puerta de Sevilla, built by the Almohads on Roman foundations next to the Seville Gate, was enlarged by Peter the Cruel with the addition of the Salones de Presos (Halls of Prisoners) and other chambers. In 1992 archaeological excavations were conducted to the southwest of the fortress, resulting in the discovery and documentation of a new building from the time of Peter I. In the same manner as in the previously mentioned rooms, this featured decorated walls, of which traces still remain.

Most of the chapels scattered around the city date from the time of Peter I : Nuestra Señora de la Antigua or Our Lady of Antigua (where the Church of San Pedro stands now), Santa Ana, San Sebastian, San Mateo, and Santa Lucia.

From the House of Trastámara to the Catholic Monarchs

Examination of the records of the Council of Carmona have enabled historians to gain a better understanding of the hundred years before the reign of the Catholic Monarchs. Increasingly, municipal power was monopolised and made hereditary for certain lineages. New jurisdictional domains appeared in this period, granted by Henry II as a strategy to ensure the support of certain groups of the nobility in a period marked by political struggles between the monarchy and the aristocracy. These conflicts came to a head with the outbreak of civil war, as a result of which Henry IV was temporarily deposed in absentia in 1465. The strategic location of Carmona, an important military and political asset, brought a period of disorder and serious conflict for the city. The town reached a state of anarchy, with an impoverished population that refused to pay taxes, a situation which ended only with the beginning of the reign of Ferdinand and Isabella in 1479.

The end of the city's municipal autonomy marked the firm establishment of the system of Corregidores (magistrates), these officials being appointed directly by the Crown, and in whose hands lay the reins of local power.

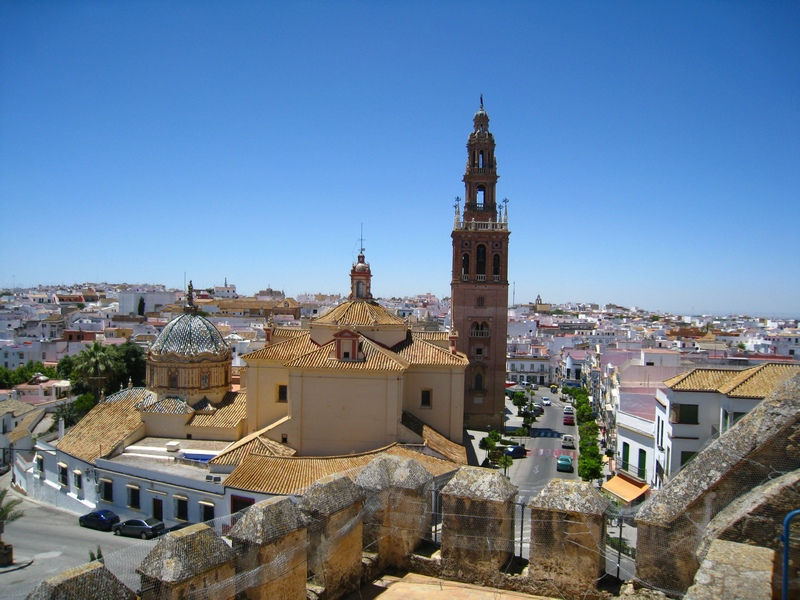
Saint Peter's Church

At this stage of its history, Carmona had acquired many of the features of its current appearance. By 1411 several parishes had been constituted, forming the basis of the present-day barrios of Santa María, Santiago, San Salvador, San Blas, San Felipe and San Bartolomé within the city walls, and of the suburbs (arrabales) San Pedro and San Mateo outside the walls. Under a special dispensation granted by Peter I, a community of Jews lived, segregated, in the San Blas barrio. According to legend, their presumed synagogue lies under the parish church, but this is impossible, since the Christian building dates precisely to Peter's reign. In 1424 the main mosque was demolished to make way for construction of the city's principal church, La Prioral de Santa María (Priory of St. Mary). The convent of Santa Clara, the first in Carmona, was founded in 1460, late compared to those in other Spanish cities. A papal Bull issued by Pope Pius II authorised its establishment. The works were undertaken with the aid of papal and royal privileges and others granted by the City Council. The current building was built in the 16th century overlooking the city's main street, with renovations made in the 17th and 18th centuries; it is a good example of Mudéjar convent architecture.

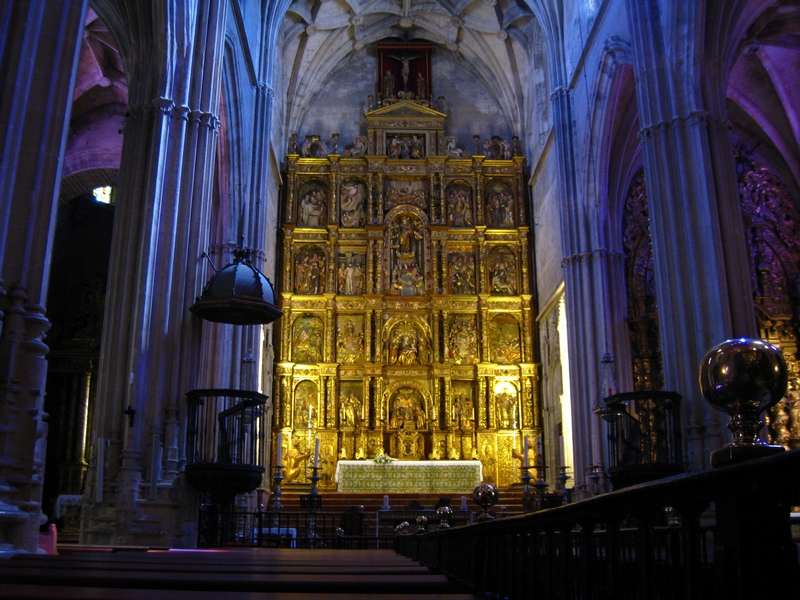
The Retablo of the Iglesia de Santa María

Construction of the Iglesia de Santa María (Church of Santa María (15th–18th centuries), the most important church in Carmona, was begun in 1424 and completed in 1551. Its architecture corresponded to the late Gothic style, although Baroque additions, the Puerta del Sol and the Sacramental Chapel, were made in the late 17th century. Works on the tower began in the 16th century, but its two upper sections were not completed until the 19th. The church's renowned altarpiece is a masterpiece of Andalusian Plateresque work: it is a polyptych arranged in a single plane, divided into five levels with five panels, surmounted by a pinnacle and flanked by a ciborium on the right. The work was designed by Juan Bautista Vázquez the Elder, and begun in 1559. Outstanding artworks of the church include the image of Virgen de Gracia (Our Lady of Grace), patron saint of the city; the Altarpiece of St. Bartholomew, with paintings done by Pedro de Campaña in 1545; the goldsmithery of the covers of the Book of the Gospels, made in the early 15th century and adorned with silver-gilt and enamels; and the custodia (monstrance). The Patio de Los Naranjos has a Visigothic calendar carved into one of its pillars.

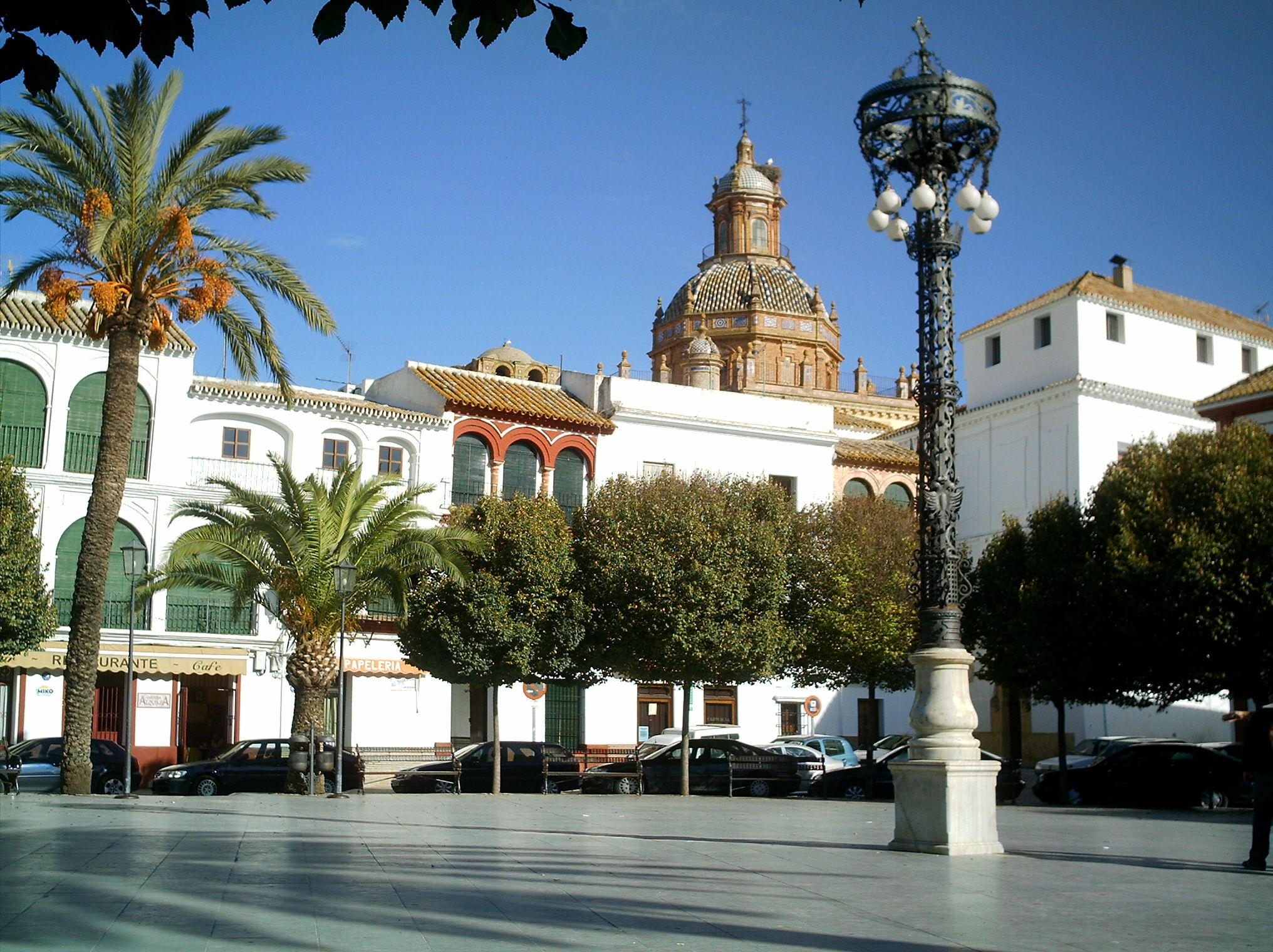
Plaza de Arriba

The first mention in the historical record of the Plaza de Arriba, now also called Plaza de San Salvador, was made in 1407; it was bounded by public buildings that housed the civil and religious institutions, as well as by several shops. The Real Alcázar was reinforced by the construction of El Cubete, an artillery fortress with gun ports; the demolition of the Alcázar de la Reina was authorised in 1498. Thirteen different religious confraternities operated nine hospitals in the city; the first was the Cofradía de la Misericordia y de la Caridad, founded in 1498. By the turn of the century, the suburb of San Pedro had grown sufficiently to accommodate a range of services not offered at the Plaza de Arriba, from a brothel to coach inns and taverns, as well as businesses of all kinds, strategically placed along the roadway to the city. A slaughterhouse was built in 1503 near what had become Carmona's expansion zone.

Miguel de Cervantes lived in Carmona for two months in 1590, when he served as commissioner of provisions to the Spanish Navy. A tiled plaque in the Casa del Cabildo memorialises his stay. The Casa del Cabildo, of Renaissance style, was built in the 16th century on the Plaza Fernando III (Plaza de Arriba), in the historic centre of the city. This building was traditionally the seat of the Carmonan municipality, and several municipal departments still have offices there, but the Ayuntamiento has moved to the neighboring house of the Jesuits, behind the baroque Church of the Savior (Iglesia del Salvador).

The Town Hall (Ayuntamiento) is also on the Plaza de San Fernando, housed in a former Jesuit college built in 1621. The building was turned into a boarding house in 1767 when the Jesuits were dispossessed of their properties during the reign of Charles III and expelled from Spain. It was refurbished as the Town Hall in 1842; the most recent renovations were made in 1980 and 1992.

The building presents a neoclassical facade to the street, and is arranged around what was formerly the convent's cloister. This courtyard displays an important archaeological find, a Roman mosaic with an image of Medusa, discovered in the old quarter of the town. In the assembly hall there is a memorial stone dedicated to Tullius Amelius dating to the 1st century AD, and fragments of the Bruma mosaic.

The Casa Mudéjar is one of the oldest buildings in Carmona, dating to the late 13th or early 14th century, It is located next to the Casa del Cabildo in the historical centre of the city at the present-day Plaza de Arriba, where the Roman forum stood. Although historical documentation is lacking, it may have been a palace of the Almohad rulers of Carmona. The exterior walls are made of brick inlaid with tiles decorated in the intricate geometric designs that characterise the Mudejar style. There are no human or animal figures in these profuse decorations, a fact which conforms to the Muslim horror vacui, and there are no Arabic phrases from the Qur'an, in the manner of the Nasrids. The segmental arches are typical of the comparatively austere Almohad style of the 13th century.

The Alcázar Real, or Alcázar de Arriba, is located at the eastern end of the walled enclosure, at the highest point in Carmona. Under Muslim rule the palace served as the governor's residence and later that of the king of the Taifa of Carmona. Afterwards the castle was expanded and renovated several times, still maintaining the integrity of its overall structure. Peter I brought in artisans from the Alcázar of Seville for the construction of the Puerta de Marchena (Marchena gate) and several towers, and for the general embellishment of the palace. Later the Catholic Monarchs built "El Cubete", a gunners' pillbox, on an oval ground plan of ashlar masonry and concrete. The construction of El Cubete is attributed to Francisco Ramírez de Oreňa. A great part of the fortress was destroyed in the earthquakes of 1504 and 1755, leaving only the gate and three of the towers, The parador Alcázar del rey Don Pedro is a modern state-run upscale hotel built on the site.

== Early Modern era (from the Habsburgs to the Bourbons) ==
The corregidores system was not an obstacle for certain families of Carmona who retained their share of local power by monopolizing the appointment of jurors and aldermen to counterbalance the authority of the Crown's representative. The Caro, Rueda, and Quintanilla families made up a closed group, closely intertwined by family connections, who enjoyed the social and economic benefits of membership in the City Council, especially the exemption from taxes.

Defining the social groups of 16th century Carmona is hampered by a lack of information. The most informative sources available are the tax rolls, which make only the distinction between those who paid taxes and those who had no tax liability. Obviously, the social reality was much more complex.

The social structure of the 17th century is better known, though it was probably not very different from that of the previous century. The numerically largest group was that of farm laborers. Half the working population of Carmona then suffered in poverty as temporary workers, working only about 120 days per year. The artisans were better off, despite practicing their trades in the context of a rural economy with scarce exchanges. In general, they served the needs of the domestic market, supplying the people with commodities for personal use, household and agricultural tools, and masonry construction. The service sector was proportionately very large, ranging from carriage drivers and footmen in the lowest stratum, up to doctors and lawyers in the highest. The large percentage of the population (clergy, members of religious communities, and rentiers) not actively employed is striking.

From an economic standpoint, Carmona was a primarily agricultural town and undoubtedly rich in this aspect. Although the lands of the surrounding floodplain, (la vega de Carmona) were known for producing abundant wheat crops, there were occasional famines and local shortages. These occurred as a result of the lopsided structure of land ownership, concentrated as it was in the hands of a few who managed the market based on their interests. To this was added the circumstance that many of the area's dryland farms belonged to people outside Carmona, their production destined for international trade. To deal with these food crises, pósitos, or municipal granaries, were created to serve as a sort of deposit bank of grain to aid farmers in need. These were made a public institution of Carmona in 1531.

Carmona's municipal territory decreased throughout the reign of Philip II as a result of the king's policy of obtaining resources by the sale of properties. Undeveloped areas, communal lands and royal manors were sold to the nobility to solve the financial difficulties of the Crown. The reign of the Habsburg kings of Spain posed an ongoing challenge for Carmona to meet the demands for men and money made by the royal Court, which was perpetually involved in military conflicts.

During this period Carmona's population began to grow steadily. This does not mean that mortality crises, epidemics, poor harvests or the combination of both stopped occurring regularly, but that they happened less often and with less severity.

The appearance of the city changed during the early modern era. The city walls and the whole defensive system suffered a progressive deterioration as the widespread adoption of modern artillery made them ineffective. Already battered by the earthquake of 1504, the abandonment of regular repair and maintenance campaigns promoted the system's slow destruction, and presented new opportunities for the populace to occupy what were once unsafe wastelands.

The 16th century was the century of the great monastic foundations, in which they engulfed a number of properties previously occupied by private homes. The convents of Madre de Dios and Concepción, the now defunct Santa Catalina and Carmen convents, and the renovated San Sebastian convent all exemplify the conventual architecture of Carmona.

In the 17th century, city planning was reduced to a few specific interventions aimed at regularising the streets and reconfiguring some of the plazas. The Lasso and San Blas plazas were built almost in their present form while the Baroque structure of the 18th century Convent of the Discalced (barefooted) defined the space of the small plaza of Santa María.

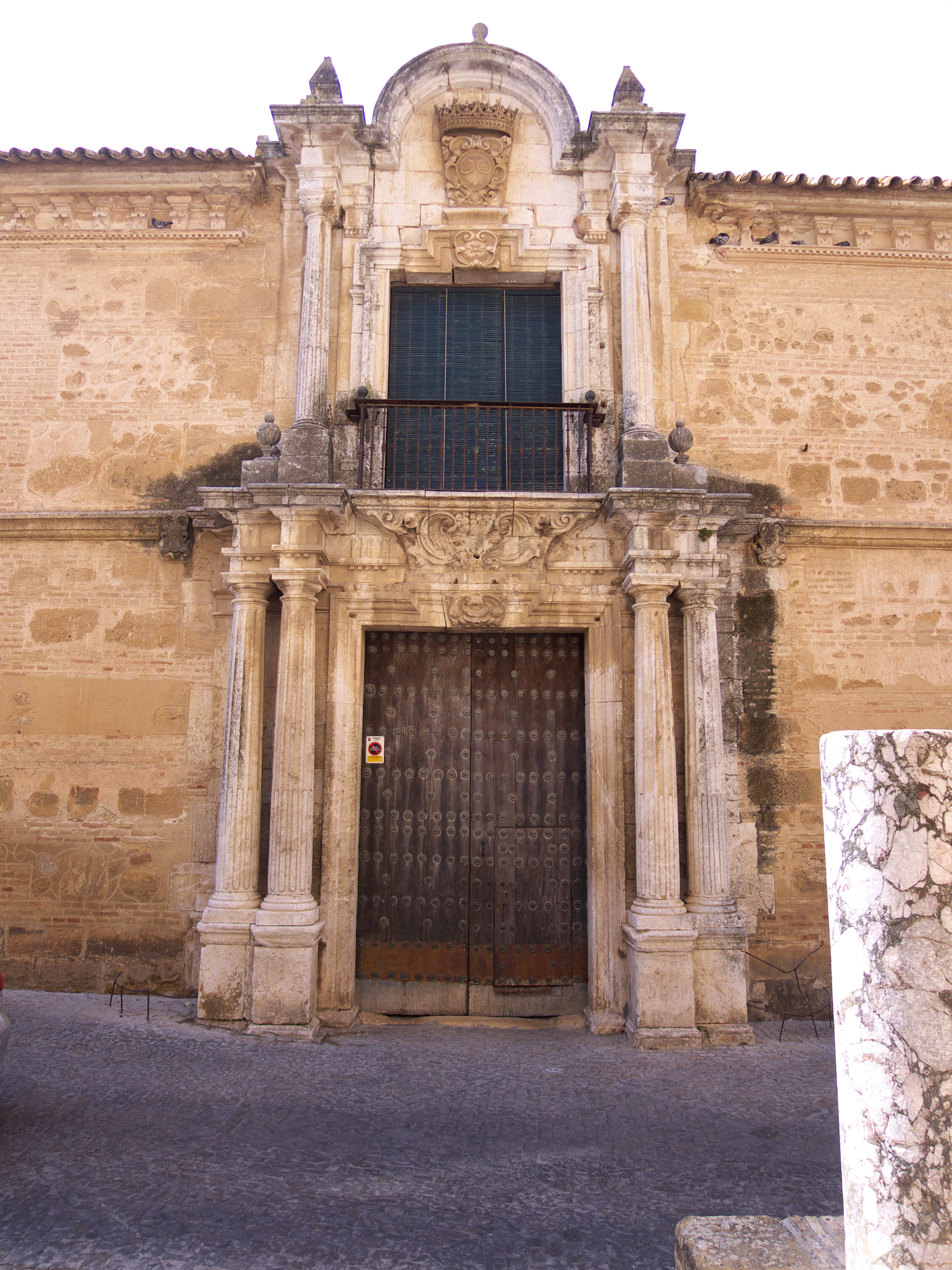
The Rueda Palace

If the 16th was the century of the convents in Carmona, the 18th was the century of the grand houses of the nobility. The most notable building façades of the mansions on the streets of Carmona are in the Baroque style. A list of their owners would include the Marquis of las Torres and the Baron of Gracia Real, as well as the Rueda, the Domínguez, the Aguilar, and the Caro families.

The Baroque period left a deep imprint in the city. The architecture of some of the churches, such as that of San Bartolomé, San Blas, and Santiago revealed new interpretations of the structure and ornamentation typical of this style. Something similar happened with the convents: the old ogival porticoes of Santa Clara and Concepción were filled in to accommodate 18th century facades. The renovation of San Pedro and the construction of San Salvador closed the book on Baroque religious architecture in Carmona.

A fountain has existed at the Plaza de Abajo for centuries; it was renovated during the reign of Joanna of Castile and since then has been known as the Fuente de los Leones (Fountain of the Lions) for the eight carved stone lions at its corners. The fountain's present basin was made by the master stonemason Francisco Ramírez Carrillo in the late 17th century. The Fuente de los Leones stands now at the beginning of the Alameda. In preparation for the expected influx of visitors during the Ibero-American Exposition of 1929 in Seville, the Plaza de Abajo and the Alameda were modernised beginning in 1925 with new gardens, benches, fencing, lighting, and paving; the works, adorned with Sevillian tiles, were done in the style of the architect Aníbal González, who designed the most ambitious project of the exhibition, the Plaza de España.

The Alameda de Alfonso XII, the tree-lined avenue of the city, is located along the bottom edge of the natural watercourse formed by the escarpment of the Los Alcores valley, near the Puerta de Sevilla. Formerly a rural area where livestock was raised, it developed gradually as the population moved into the San Pedro area, just outside the main city walls. From the early 18th century, the Alameda was inspired by that of Seville, but existed in only a primitive state until 1794, when some improvements were made. By the 19th century, the Alameda was a public garden park typical of the age and became popular as a promenade for the bourgeoisie.

Over time the Alameda had deteriorated and was recently renovated with the addition of a restaurant, a café with an outdoor terrace, and various tourist facilities.

== 19th and 20th centuries ==
At the beginning of the 19th century the city had an economy based on wheat and oil production—industry, transport and trade were barely developed. Its social structure was unbalanced, with an oligarchy of rich landowners dominating the city council and using their tax-exempt status to increase their own fortunes. This and several other factors led Carmona to a crisis: the decrease of communal resources, including forest and grasslands, the reduction in the reserves of grain held by the pósito (public granary), the regressive tax structure, the lack of diverse trade, poor sanitary conditions in the city, the lack of public health care and the poverty of most of the population.

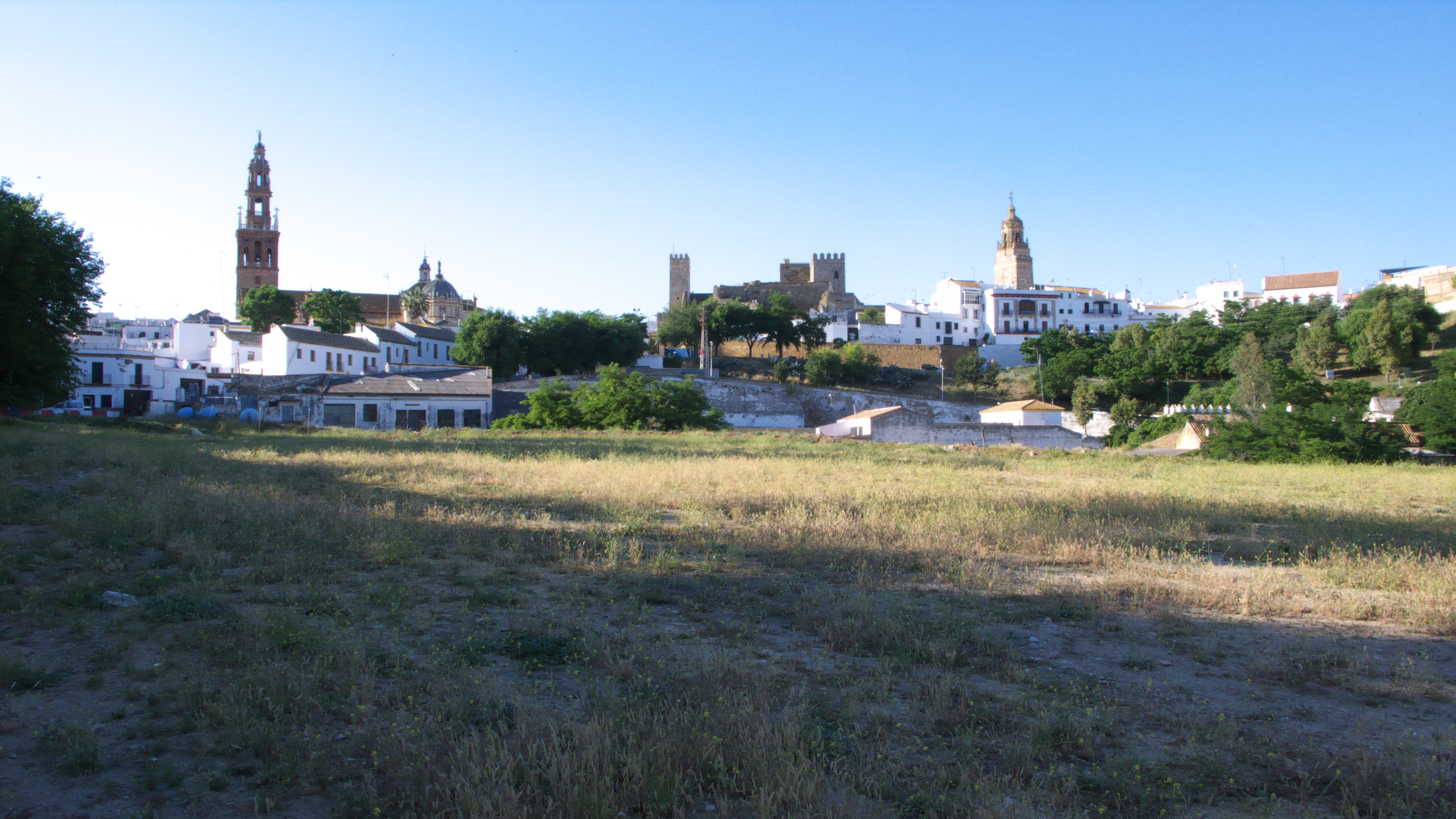
Skyline of Carmona

During the Peninsular War, the city's horsemen participated in the decisive Battle of Bailén, helping to fight back Napoleon's elite Imperial Dragoons commanded by General Dupont in the first major defeat of the Grande Armée on 16–19 July 1808. Their success is still recalled by the townspeople.

Even today, Carmona remains a largely agrarian city, its resources based on exploitation of the land, with a weak service sector. The pre-industrial economy of the early 19th century, sustained by the cultivation of the Mediterranean triad of wheat, olive oil, and grapes for wine, supported a very rigid social structure, derived directly from the distribution of the land: the nobility and the clergy owned large estates, smallholders and tenant farmers lived on small farmsteads (minifundios), while the majority group of agricultural laborers alternated field work with activities almost predatory in a subsistence economy.

The industrial sector was dedicated to the production of artisanal goods to supply the most essential needs of the population as well as the fabrication of agricultural tools. The service sector consisted of a broad range of service providers, from individuals in the highest social stratum, such as clergy and professionals, to members of the lower classes, such as wagon drivers and servants.

In the 19th century, after the confiscation of church property in 1835–1837 by the government of Spain, the distribution of lands around Carmona changed. While the Church had its property confiscated and sold at public auction, the nobility, in the words of Cruz Villalon, "incrementó su patrimonio territorial en nuestra ciudad" ("Increased its territorial proprietorship in our city"). At the same time, a group of large tenant farmers and nobles bought expropriated properties, creating a class of owners who made up "the agrarian bourgeoisie".

Labourers, still the majority of the population, had settled from the 15th century mainly in the suburb of San Pedro. Their living conditions, after the period of confiscations commonly referred to as La Desamortización (The Disentailment), had deteriorated as a result of the loss of the public commons.

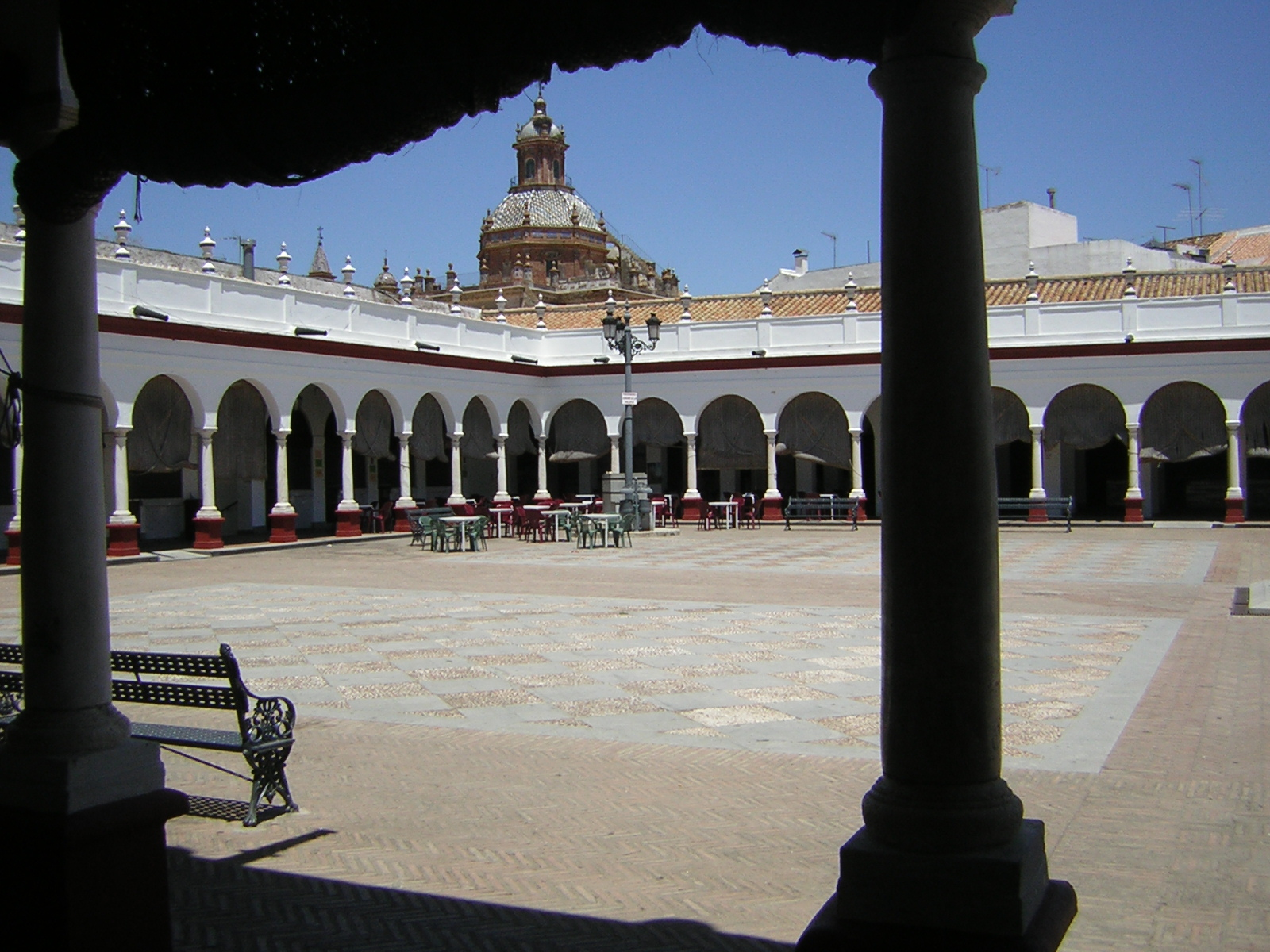
Plaza del Mercado de Abastos

The disentailment of Church property allowed the city to take advantage of the huge space occupied by the now empty convent of Santa Catalina, giving Carmona its first stable market location, the Plaza del Mercado de Abastos. The city jail was expanded in the space freed by the emptying of the San Jose convent, and the first cemetery located outside the walls in contemporary times was placed at the convent of Santa Ana in 1840, with a strict prohibition on further burials in the parishes. Lack of budget funds saved the Puerta de Sevilla from the depredations of those who regarded the walls as obstructing the development of the city.

In the second half of the 19th century and the first half of the 20th, Carmona reached a higher level of industrialization with the growth of agriculture-related industries such as textile mills, olive oil production, flour milling, bakeries, and the manufacture of soap.

The rise of the petit bourgeoisie locally was illustrated with the ascent to positions of power by men who wished to propagate the ideas of the Enlightenment inherited from the 18th century. This social trend resulted in the creation of cultural societies like the Sociedad Arqueológica de Carmona (Carmona Archaeological Society) to promote science and intellectual interchange, and encouraged a group of scholars whose thought was imbued with those ideals to donate their works or property to the city, among them George Bonsor, Juan Fernández López, Domínguez Pascual, and Vega Peláez.

Urbanisation accelerated during the 20th century, and the growth in population overwhelmed the city. As it grew to the southwest, the area around San Antón filled with housing developments. Carmona acquired 28,000 more residents in need of housing during the economic expansion of the 1960s. The new neighbourhood of La Guita was formed and the neighbourhoods Virgen de Gracia and La Paz rose around Villarrosa, the Quemadero de San Francisco and La Calera de Benítez.
