= Carissa, Spain =

Carisa or Carissa (Greek: Κάρισσα, Ptol. ii. 4, § 13) was an ancient city of the Turdetani in Hispania Baetica, in the conventus of Gades, having the civitas Latina. Several of its coins are extant. Pliny refers to the city as Carissa cognomine Aurelia. The city is usually associated, due to inscriptions, with Carixa, near Bornos, in the Province of Cádiz.
