= Turdetani =

Ethnic group

Main language areas in Iberia c. 300 BC

Approximate area where the Turdetani people lived

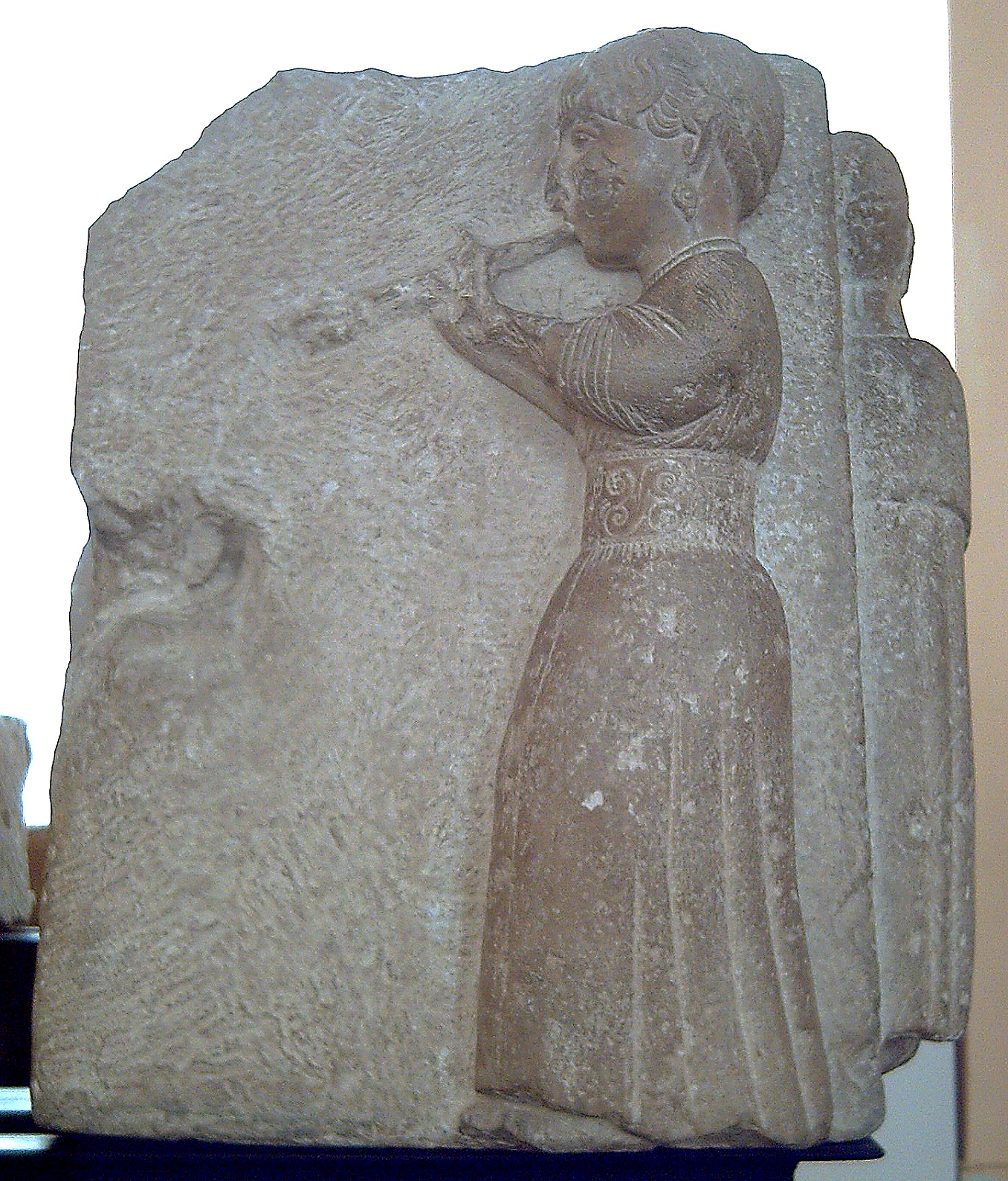
High-relief showing an Auletris (woman playing an aulos). Ancient Iberian artwork sculpted in limestone at the end of the 3rd or the beginning of the 2nd century BC. It is part of the so-called Sculptures of Osuna, Seville Province, Andalusia, Spain.

The Turdetani were an ancient pre-Roman people of the Iberian Peninsula, living in the valley of the Guadalquivir (the river that the Turdetani called by two names: Kertis and Rérkēs (Ῥέρκης) and which was later known to the Romans as Baetis), in what was to become the Roman Province of Hispania Baetica (modern south of Spain). Strabo considers them to have been the successors to the people of Tartessos and to have spoken a language closely related to the Tartessian language.

== History ==
The Turdetani were in constant contact with their Greek and Carthaginian neighbors. Herodotus describes them as enjoying a civilized rule under a king, Arganthonios, who welcomed Phocaean colonists in the fifth century BC. The Turdetani are said to have possessed a written legal code and to have employed Iberian mercenaries to carry on their wars against Rome. Strabo notes that the Turdetani were the most civilized people in Iberia, with the implication that their ordered, urbanized culture was most in accord with Greco-Roman models. After the end of the Second Punic War, the Turdetani rose against their Roman governor in 197 BC. When Cato the Elder became consul in 195 BC, he was given the command of the whole of Hispania. Cato first put down the rebellion in the northeast, then marched south and put down the revolt by the Turdetani, "the least warlike of all the Hispanic tribes". Cato was able to return to Rome in 194, leaving two praetors in charge of the two provinces.

In Plautus' comedy The Captives, a reference to the Turdetani (Act i, Scene ii) amusingly purports to show that their district in Hispania Baetica had become proverbially famous for the thrushes and other small birds which it supplied to Roman tables (Turdus being the thrush genus).

== See also ==
- Carpia
- Carissa
- Southwest Paleohispanic script
- Turduli
