= Arthrobacter tecti =

Scientific classification
- Domain: Bacteria
- Kingdom: Bacillati
- Phylum: Actinomycetota
- Class: Actinomycetia
- Order: Micrococcales
- Family: Micrococcaceae
- Genus: Arthrobacter
- Species: A. tecti

Binomial name
- Arthrobacter tecti Heyrman et al. 2005

Type strain
- DSM 16407; Heyrman R-5369; IAM 15323; JCM 21772; LMG 22282 mcsc2219 R-5369

Species of bacterium

Arthrobacter tecti is a Gram-positive, non-spore-forming and non-motile bacterium species from the genus Arthrobacter which has been isolated from a biofilm which covered the Servilia tomb from the Roman necropolis of Carmona in Carmona, Spain.
