= Convento de Santa Clara =

Convento de Santa Clara may refer to:

- Convento de Santa Clara (Burgos), Spain
- Convento de Santa Clara (Carmona), Spain
- Convento de Santa Clara (Córdoba), Spain
