= Arthrobacter tumbae =

Scientific classification
- Domain: Bacteria
- Kingdom: Bacillati
- Phylum: Actinomycetota
- Class: Actinomycetia
- Order: Micrococcales
- Family: Micrococcaceae
- Genus: Arthrobacter
- Species: A. tumbae

Binomial name
- Arthrobacter tumbae Heyrman et al. 2005

Type strain
- CIP 108900; DSM 16406; Heyrman R-5305; IAM 15324; JCM 21773; LMG 19501 mcsc1155 R-5305; VTT E-072668

Species of bacterium

Arthrobacter tumbae is a bacterium species from the genus of Arthrobacter which has been isolated from a biofilm which covered the Servilia tomb in the Roman necropolis of Carmona in Carmona, Spain.
