= Arthrobacter monumenti =

Scientific classification
- Domain: Bacteria
- Kingdom: Bacillati
- Phylum: Actinomycetota
- Class: Actinomycetia
- Order: Micrococcales
- Family: Micrococcaceae
- Genus: Arthrobacter
- Species: A. monumenti

Binomial name
- Arthrobacter monumenti Heyrman et al. 2005

Type strain
- DSM 16405; JCM 21770; LMG 19502

Species of bacterium

Arthrobacter monumenti is a bacterium species from the genus Arthrobacter which has been isolated from biofilms covering a Servilia tomb in Carmona, Spain.
