= Arthrobacter parietis =

Scientific classification
- Domain: Bacteria
- Kingdom: Bacillati
- Phylum: Actinomycetota
- Class: Actinomycetia
- Order: Micrococcales
- Family: Micrococcaceae
- Genus: Arthrobacter
- Species: A. parietis

Binomial name
- Arthrobacter parietis Heyrman et al. 2005

Type strain
- DSM 16404; JCM 14917; LMG 22281

Species of bacterium

Arthrobacter parietis is a bacterium species from the genus Arthrobacter which has been isolated from biofilms which covered the Servilia tomb from the Roman necropolis of Carmona in Carmona, Spain.
