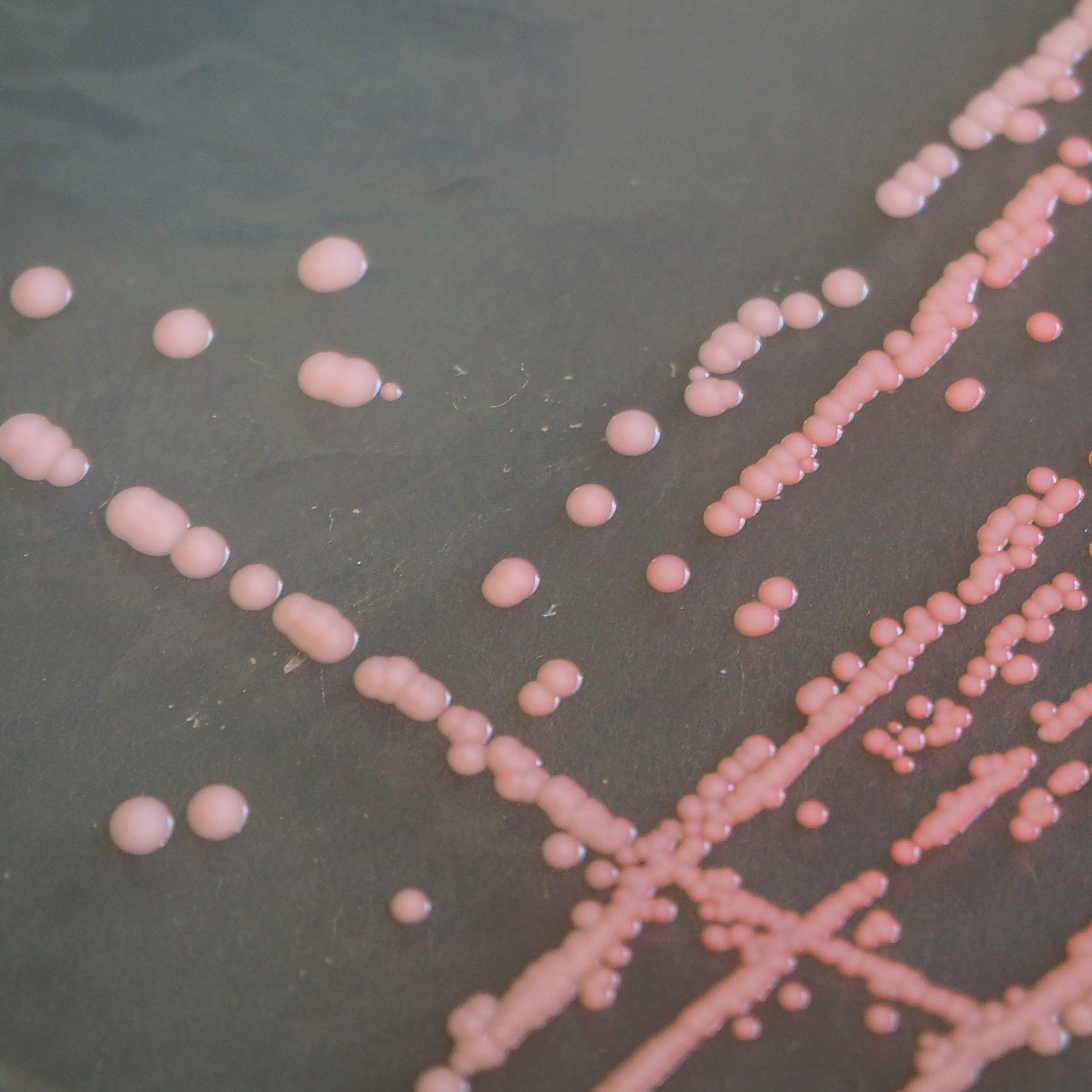

Scientific classification
- Domain: Bacteria
- Kingdom: Bacillati
- Phylum: Actinomycetota
- Class: Actinomycetia
- Order: Micrococcales
- Family: Micrococcaceae
- Genus: Arthrobacter
- Species: A. bussei

Binomial name
- Arthrobacter bussei Flegler et al. 2020

Type strain
- DSM 109896; KR32; LMG 31480; NCCB 100733

= Arthrobacter bussei =

Species of bacterium

Arthrobacter bussei (bus'se.i. N.L. gen. n. bussei, of Busse; named after the German microbiologist Hans-Jürgen Busse) is a pink-coloured, aerobic, coccus-shaped, Gram-stain-positive, oxidase-positive and catalase-positive bacterium isolated from cheese made of cow's milk. A. bussei is non-motile and does not form spores. Rod–coccus life cycle is not observed. Cells are 1.1–1.5 μm in diameter. On trypticase soy agar it forms pink-coloured, raised and round colonies, which are 1.0 mm in diameter after 5 days at 30 °C The genome of the strain A. bussei KR32^{T} has been fully sequenced.

== Characteristics ==
=== Morphology ===
The cells of A. bussei are coccus-shaped. The bacterium is Gram-stain-positive. The cells have a diameter of 1.1–1.5 μm. A rod-coccus life cycle is not observed. The species is not flagellated and therefore non-motile. Endospores are not formed. On trypticase soy agar the cells forms very small colonies. Their diameter is 1.0 mm after 5 days at 30 °C. Colonies are pink-coloured, opaque and soft. From above colonies appear round in shape and have a smooth edge. From the side the colonies are raised.

=== Physiology ===
The metabolism of A. bussei is based on aerobic respiration. The species is aerobic and needs oxygen to grow. Oxidase test and catalase test are positive. Furthermore, the metabolism can be characterized as chemoorganotrophic and heterotrophic. A. bussei uses organic compounds as an energy source and synthesize substances. Growth occurs at 1–45 °C and pH 7.0–8.0. Tolerates a maximum of 7.5 % NaCl. Growth on Columbia blood agar but not on violet red bile dextrose agar. The bacterium shows no proteolytic or lipolytic activity. Optimal temperature for growth is 27–30 °C. Trypticase soy agar or trypticase soy broth is suitable for cultivation.

A. bussei is able to hydrolyse aesculin but not gelatine. The bacterium is positive for alkaline phosphatase, esterase (C4), esterase lipase (C8), lipase (C14), leucine arylamidase, valine arylamidase, cystine arylamidase, trypsin, naphthol AS-BI-phosphohydrolase, α-galactosidase, β-galactosidase, α-glucosidase, β-glucosidase and α-mannosidase. Negative for α-chymotrypsin, acid phosphatase, β-glucuronidase, N-acetyl-β-glucosaminidase, α-fucosidase, arginine dihydrolase and urease. Within the chemoorgano-heterotrophic metabolism, A. bussei can use a large number of organic compounds as a source of carbon. These include carbohydrates (pentoses, hexoses and oligosaccharides), sugar alcohols and amino acids. Under aerobic conditions, for example, D-glucose is used, but no acid is formed, as would be typical for fermentation. Other usable substrates are glycerol, L-arabinose, D-xylose, D-galactose, D-glucose, D-fructose, D-mannose, L-rhamnose, D-mannitol, N-acetylglucosamine, arbutin, aesculin, salicin, D-cellobiose, D-maltose, D-melibiose, sucrose, D-trehalose, D-raffinose, starch, glycogen, D-turanose, potassium gluconate and potassium 5-ketogluconate. Furthermore amino acids leucine and valine are assimilated.

Carbohydrates that cannot be used are erythritol, D-arabinose, D-ribose, L-xylose, D-ribitol, methyl-β-D-xylopyranoside, L-sorbose, dulcitol, inositol, D-sorbitol, Methyl-α-D-mannopyranoside, methyl-α-D-glucopyranoside, amygdalin, D-lactose, inulin, D-melezitose, xylitol, gentiobiose, D-lyxose, D-tagatose, fucose, arabitol and potassium 2-ketogluconate. It cannot reduce nitrate to nitrite.

=== Chemotaxonomy ===
The fatty acids occurring in the membrane lipids are iso-C_{14:0}, iso-C_{14:1} cis 9, C_{14:0}, iso-C_{15:1} cis 9, iso-C_{15:1} cis 4, iso-C_{15:0}, anteiso-C_{15:0}, iso-C_{16:1} cis 9, iso-C_{16:0}, C_{16:1} cis 9, C_{16:0}, C_{17:1} cis 10/11, C_{17:1} cis 9, iso-C_{17:0} and anteiso-C_{17:0}. The main fatty acids are anteiso-C_{15:0} and iso-C_{15:0} at 30 °C. At low temperatures (10 °C) monounsaturated fatty acids are produced.

A. bussei produces menaquinone-9 (H_{2}), which is the main quinone in the genus Arthrobacter, menaquinone-8 (H_{2}) and menaquinone-9. The bacterium also produces the polar lipids diphosphatidylglycerol, phosphatidylglycerol, phosphatidylinositol and monoacyldimannosyl-monoacylglycerol.

The pink colouration of the bacterium is caused by the C_{50} carotenoid bacterioruberin and a number of its mono-, di- and tetraglycosylated derivatives.

=== Phylogeny ===
A. bussei is assigned in the "pink Arthrobacter agilis group" within the "Arthrobacter agilis group", which forms a stable clade. The "pink Arthrobacter agilis group" includes the species Arthrobacter agilis, Arthrobacter ruber and Arthrobacter echini, which all have a pink pigmentation. Other species of the Arthrobacter agilis group', Arthrobacter flavus, Arthrobacter tecti, Arthrobacter parietis and Arthrobacter tumbae are yellow or yellow-orange pigmented.

=== Genome ===
The genome of strain A. bussei KR32^{T} was fully sequenced in 2019 and has a size of 3.63 megabase pairs. There are 3086 proteins annotated. The genome contains, inter alia, genes for the biosynthesis of carotenoids and two putative acyl-CoA desaturases, by which the bacterium can synthesize monounsaturated fatty acids. The genomic DNA G+C content of the type strain is 69.14 mol%, based on the whole genome sequence.

== Culture collections ==
The type strain A. bussei KR32^{T} (=DSM 109896^{T} =LMG 31480^{T} =NCCB 100733^{T} ) is available for scientific and commercial purposes.
