= Ibn Hamušk =

12th-century Iberian warlord

Ibrahim b. Ahmed b. Moharech b. Hamusk (fl. 1144–1172), known as Hemochico in the Christian chronicles, referred to simply as Ibn Hamušk, (Note: Also hispanicised by Mariano Gaspar Remiro as Abenhamusco.) was a warlord in 12th-century Iberia. He was a close collaborator of his son-in-law Ibn Mardanīsh (the so-called 'Wolf King') in the latter's resistance efforts against the Almohads. He betrayed Ibn Mardanīsh later in his life, siding with the Almohads.

== Biography ==
He was of Muladi Aragonese or Christian background. In the context of the series of revolts against Almoravid rule in the Iberian Peninsula, Ibn Hamušk rose against the Almoravids in Hisn Saqubus (Socovos) in 1144, and took over Segura in 1147. Presented as ruler of Murcia, he and Ibn Mardanīsh (presented as ruler of Valencia) held talks with Alfonso VII in February 1149.

Alongside his son-in-law Ibn Mardanīsh, they created an anti-Almohad stronghold in Eastern al-Andalus. They left Murcia at the helm of an army largely consisting of Christian troops and took Jaén in 1159, hereby creating an independent state ruled by Ibn Hamušk centered in the city, which also spanned to other sizeable cities such as Úbeda and Baeza. Both Ibn Hamušk and Ibn Mardanīsh allied with Christians to attack Córdoba in 1158–1160, failing to conquer the city but ravaging the countryside. He took Écija and Carmona in 1160. He also unsuccessfully laid siege to Seville. He took Granada in 1162, with the inside help from local Jews who had been reportedly forced to convert to Islam. The city was lost thereafter as an Almohad support army led by Abu Yaqub Yusuf came from overseas and forced Ibn Hamušk and Ibn Mardanīsh to flee east.

He betrayed his son-in-law, perhaps influenced by the alleged mistreatment of his daughter by Ibn Mardanīsh (Ibn Mardanīsh's wife, who was repudiated), or because he may have taken offence by some words said by Ibn Mardanīsh after a defeat near Murcia. Whatever the case, he pledged allegiance to the Almohad caliph in 1169. The territories of the Sierra del Segura passed to Almohad control. He took part in a 1172 offensive at the service of the Almohads, taking away from Christians the places of Vilches and Alcaraz, which were handed to him.

According to Ibn Sa'īd's account, Ibn Hamušk displayed an extremely violent and bloodthirsty behaviour.
