= Arthrobacter psychrochitiniphilus =

Scientific classification
- Domain: Bacteria
- Kingdom: Bacillati
- Phylum: Actinomycetota
- Class: Actinomycetia
- Order: Micrococcales
- Family: Micrococcaceae
- Genus: Arthrobacter
- Species: A. psychrochitiniphilus

Binomial name
- Arthrobacter psychrochitiniphilus Wang et al. 2009

Type strain
- CGMCC 1.6355; JCM 13874; GP3

Species of bacterium

Arthrobacter psychrochitiniphilus is a psychrotrophic bacterium species from the genus Arthrobacter which has been isolated from Adélie penguins in Antarctica.
