= Arthrobacter woluwensis =

Scientific classification
- Domain: Bacteria
- Kingdom: Bacillati
- Phylum: Actinomycetota
- Class: Actinomycetia
- Order: Micrococcales
- Family: Micrococcaceae
- Genus: Arthrobacter
- Species: A. woluwensis

Binomial name
- Arthrobacter woluwensis Funke et al. 1997

Type strain
- ATCC 700220; CCUG 36790; CIP 104908; CUL 1808; DSM 10495; JCM 11679

Species of bacterium

Arthrobacter woluwensis is a species of Gram-positive bacteria. It has been implicated in some cases of subacute infective endocarditis.
