= Arthrobacter methylotrophus =

Scientific classification
- Domain: Bacteria
- Kingdom: Bacillati
- Phylum: Actinomycetota
- Class: Actinomycetia
- Order: Micrococcales
- Family: Micrococcaceae
- Genus: Arthrobacter
- Species: A. methylotrophus

Binomial name
- Arthrobacter methylotrophus Borodina et al. 2002

Type strain
- ATCC BAA-111; TGA; DSM 14008; JCM 13519

Species of bacterium

Arthrobacter methylotrophus is a bacterium species from the genus Arthrobacter which has been isolated from soil around the roots of the plant Tagetes minuta.
