= Arthrobacter gyeryongensis =

Scientific classification
- Domain: Bacteria
- Kingdom: Bacillati
- Phylum: Actinomycetota
- Class: Actinomycetia
- Order: Micrococcales
- Family: Micrococcaceae
- Genus: Arthrobacter
- Species: A. gyeryongensis

Binomial name
- Arthrobacter gyeryongensis Hoang et al. 2014

Type strain
- JCM 18514; KCTC 33072; DCY72

Species of bacterium

Arthrobacter gyeryongensis is a Gram-positive and rod-shaped bacterium species from the genus Arthrobacter which has been isolated from soil from a field with Gynostemma pentaphyllum plants.
