= Arthrobacter ramosus =

Scientific classification
- Domain: Bacteria
- Kingdom: Bacillati
- Phylum: Actinomycetota
- Class: Actinomycetia
- Order: Micrococcales
- Family: Micrococcaceae
- Genus: Arthrobacter
- Species: A. ramosus

Binomial name
- Arthrobacter ramosus Jensen 1960 (Approved Lists 1980)

Type strain
- AJ 1439; ATCC 13727; BCRC 14856; CCM 1646; CCRC 14856; CCUG 23844; CDA 881; CGMCC 1.1896; CIP 102361; DSM 16186; DSM 20546; HMGB B50; HMGBB50; I G m 25; IAM 12344; IFO 12672; IFO 12958; IGm25; IMET 10685; JCM 1334; Jensen IGm25; KCTC 3386 lgm25 LMG 16185; LMG 16256; LMG 17309; NBRC 12672; NBRC 12958; NCIB 9066; NCIMB 9066; NRRL B-3159; V. Jensen I Gm 25; VKM Ac-1117; VKM Ac-1129; VKM B-805; VKM VKM B-805

Species of bacterium

Arthrobacter ramosus is a bacterium species from the genus Arthrobacter which has been isolated from beech forest soil. Arthrobacter ramosus produces coproporphyrin III.
