= Arthrobacter agilis =

Scientific classification
- Domain: Bacteria
- Kingdom: Bacillati
- Phylum: Actinomycetota
- Class: Actinomycetes
- Order: Micrococcales
- Family: Micrococcaceae
- Genus: Arthrobacter
- Species: A. agilis

Binomial name
- Arthrobacter agilis Koch et al. 1995

Type strain
- 28(3), A.C. Baird-Parker 97, AJ 3960, ATCC 966, CCM 2390, CCTM La 2977, CCUG 33025, CIP 81.67, CIP 81.67T, DSM 20550, Hao HK 961, IAM 12848, IFO 15260, IFO 15319, IMET 11266, IMSNU 11061, JCM 2584, Jeffries W.O. 219, Jeffries WO 219, KCTC 3200, L. Jeffries W.O.219, Levine 28(3), LMG 14213, LMG 17244, M. Levine 28 /3/, NBRC 15260, NBRC 15319, NCDO 983, NCFB 983, NCIMB 700983, NCTC 7509, VKM B-19723, VKM B-1973, VTT E-052921, W.O. 219

Synonyms
- Micrococcus agilis

Species of bacterium

Arthrobacter agilis is a psychrotrophic bacterium species from the genus of Arthrobacter which occurs in lake water and Antarctic sea ice. Arthrobacter agilis produces dimethylhexadecylamine and carotenoid.

Arthrobacter agilis is a plant growth promoting and cold active hydrolytic enzymes producing psychrotrophic bacterium, isolated from Pangong Lake, a subglacial lake in north western Himalayas, India. Genome analysis revealed metabolic versatility with genes involved in metabolism and cold shock adaptation, utilization and biosynthesis of diverse structural and storage polysaccharides such as plant based carbon polymers. The genome of Arthrobacter agilis strain L77 consists of 3,608,439 bp (3.60 Mb) of a circular chromosome. The genome comprises 3316 protein coding genes and 74 RNA genes, 725 hypothetical proteins, 25 pseudo-genes and 1404 unique genes. The candidate genes coding for hydrolytic enzymes and cold shock proteins were identified in the genome. Arthrobacter agilis strain L77 will serve as a source for antifreeze proteins, functional enzymes and other bioactive molecules in future bioprospecting projects.
