= Arthrobacter livingstonensis =

Scientific classification
- Domain: Bacteria
- Kingdom: Bacillati
- Phylum: Actinomycetota
- Class: Actinomycetia
- Order: Micrococcales
- Family: Micrococcaceae
- Genus: Arthrobacter
- Species: A. livingstonensis

Binomial name
- Arthrobacter livingstonensis Ganzert et al. 2011

Type strain
- DSM 22825; LI2; NCCB 100314

Species of bacterium

Arthrobacter livingstonensis is a species of bacteria. It is psychrotolerant, halotolerant, Gram-positive, motile and facultatively anaerobic. It possesses a rod–coccus cycle.

A strain found in 2020 in Antarctica was able to synthesize undecane.
