= Arthrobacter pityocampae =

Scientific classification
- Domain: Bacteria
- Kingdom: Bacillati
- Phylum: Actinomycetota
- Class: Actinomycetia
- Order: Micrococcales
- Family: Micrococcaceae
- Genus: Arthrobacter
- Species: A. pityocampae

Binomial name
- Arthrobacter pityocampae İnce et al. 2014

Type strain
- DSM 21719; NCCB 100254; Tp2

Species of bacterium

Arthrobacter pityocampae is a Gram-positive, non-spore-forming and non-motile bacterium species from the genus Arthrobacter which has been isolated from the larva of the moth Thaumetopoea pityocampa in Samsun, Turkey.
