= Arthrobacter flavus =

Scientific classification
- Domain: Bacteria
- Kingdom: Bacillati
- Phylum: Actinomycetota
- Class: Actinomycetia
- Order: Micrococcales
- Family: Micrococcaceae
- Genus: Arthrobacter
- Species: A. flavus

Binomial name
- Arthrobacter flavus Reddy et al. 2000

Type strain
- CMS 19Y; DSM 15322; JCM 11496; MTCC 3476

Species of bacterium

Arthrobacter flavus is a species of psychrophilic bacteria. It is aerobic, gram-positive, non-spore-forming, non-motile, exhibits a rod-coccus growth cycle and produces a yellow pigment.
