= Arthrobacter pokkalii =

Scientific classification
- Domain: Bacteria
- Kingdom: Bacillati
- Phylum: Actinomycetota
- Class: Actinomycetes
- Order: Micrococcales
- Family: Micrococcaceae
- Genus: Arthrobacter
- Species: A. pokkalii

Binomial name
- Arthrobacter pokkalii Krishnan et al. 2017

Type strain
- KCTC 29498; LMG 28262; MTCC 12358; NRIC 0967; P3B162

Species of bacterium

Arthrobacter pokkalii is a bacterium from the genus Arthrobacter which has been isolated from the rhizosphere of pokkali rice from Kerala, India. Arthrobacter pokkalii has beneficial properties for plants.
