= Arthrobacter oryzae =

Scientific classification
- Domain: Bacteria
- Kingdom: Bacillati
- Phylum: Actinomycetota
- Class: Actinomycetia
- Order: Micrococcales
- Family: Micrococcaceae
- Genus: Arthrobacter
- Species: A. oryzae

Binomial name
- Arthrobacter oryzae Kageyama et al. 2008

Type strain
- KV-651; JCM 15922; NBRC 102055; NRRL B-24478

Species of bacterium

Arthrobacter oryzae is a Gram-positive bacterium species from the genus Arthrobacter which has been isolated from soil in Japan.
