= Mineral salts pyridone broth =

Mineral salts pyridine broth is a selective medium for bacteria that can metabolize pyridine (which is an unusual carbon source that a select few types of bacteria can use). This medium is used to isolate bacteria belonging to the genus Arthrobacter among other bacteria genera.

Mineral Salts Pyridine Broth
Ingredient	g/L
Na_{2}HPO_{4}	1.6
KH_{2}PO_{4}	21.0
(NH_{4})_{2}SO_{4}	2.6
MgSO_{4}*7H_{2}O	0.1
Pyridine (Sole C source)	2.0
