= Arthrobacter paludis =

Scientific classification
- Domain: Bacteria
- Kingdom: Bacillati
- Phylum: Actinomycetota
- Class: Actinomycetia
- Order: Micrococcales
- Family: Micrococcaceae
- Genus: Arthrobacter
- Species: A. paludis

Binomial name
- Arthrobacter paludis Zhang et al. 2018

Type strain
- CCTCC AB 206013; IAM 15383; JCM 21827; LC6

Species of bacterium

Arthrobacter paludis is a Gram-positive, non-endospore-forming and strictly aerobic bacterium from the genus Arthrobacter which has been isolated from hydric soil from Seogmo Island, Korea.
