= Arthrobacter ruber =

Scientific classification
- Domain: Bacteria
- Kingdom: Bacillati
- Phylum: Actinomycetota
- Class: Actinomycetia
- Order: Micrococcales
- Family: Micrococcaceae
- Genus: Arthrobacter
- Species: A. ruber

Binomial name
- Arthrobacter ruber Liu et al. 2018

Type strain
- CGMCC 1.9772; NBRC 113088; MDB1-42

Species of bacterium

Arthrobacter ruber is a Gram-positive bacterium from the genus Arthrobacter has been isolated from ice from the Midui glacier from Tibet.
