= Arthrobacter psychrolactophilus =

Scientific classification
- Domain: Bacteria
- Kingdom: Bacillati
- Phylum: Actinomycetota
- Class: Actinomycetia
- Order: Micrococcales
- Family: Micrococcaceae
- Genus: Arthrobacter
- Species: A. psychrolactophilus

Binomial name
- Arthrobacter psychrolactophilus Loveland-Curtze et al. 2000

Type strain
- ATCC 700733; JCM 12399; B7

Species of bacterium

Arthrobacter psychrolactophilus is a psychrotrophic bacterium species from the genus Arthrobacter which has been isolated from soil in the United States. Arthrobacter psychrolactophilus produces amylase.
