= Arthrobacter castelli =

Scientific classification
- Domain: Bacteria
- Kingdom: Bacillati
- Phylum: Actinomycetota
- Class: Actinomycetia
- Order: Micrococcales
- Family: Micrococcaceae
- Genus: Arthrobacter
- Species: A. castelli

Binomial name
- Arthrobacter castelli Heyrman et al. 2005

Type strain
- DSM 16402; DSM 16402 t1 DSM 16402 t2 Heyrman R-5102; IAM 15349; JCM 21794; LMG 22283 mcha6085

Species of bacterium

Arthrobacter castelli is a bacterium species from the genus Arthrobacter which has been isolated from biofilm from mural paintings in the Saint-Catherine chapel in Herberstein, Austria.
