= Arthrobacter echini =

Scientific classification
- Domain: Bacteria
- Kingdom: Bacillati
- Phylum: Actinomycetota
- Class: Actinomycetia
- Order: Micrococcales
- Family: Micrococcaceae
- Genus: Arthrobacter
- Species: A. echini

Binomial name
- Arthrobacter echini Lee et al. 2016

Type strain
- AM23; DSM 29493; KACC 18260

Species of bacterium

Arthrobacter echini is a Gram-positive, strictly aerobic and non-motile bacterium species from the genus Arthrobacter which has been isolated from the gut of the sea urchin Heliocidaris crassispina from Dokdo island, Korea.
