= Arthrobacter bambusae =

Scientific classification
- Domain: Bacteria
- Kingdom: Bacillati
- Phylum: Actinomycetota
- Class: Actinomycetia
- Order: Micrococcales
- Family: Micrococcaceae
- Genus: Arthrobacter
- Species: A. bambusae

Binomial name
- Arthrobacter bambusae Park et al. 2014

Type strain
- THG-GM18; JCM 19335; KACC 17531

Species of bacterium

Arthrobacter bambusae is a Gram-positive, aerobic and rod-shaped bacterium from the genus Arthrobacter which has been isolated from soil from a bamboo grove in Korea.
