= Arthrobacter subterraneus =

Scientific classification
- Domain: Bacteria
- Kingdom: Bacillati
- Phylum: Actinomycetota
- Class: Actinomycetia
- Order: Micrococcales
- Family: Micrococcaceae
- Genus: Arthrobacter
- Species: A. subterraneus

Binomial name
- Arthrobacter subterraneus Chang et al. 2008

Type strain
- CH7^{T} KCTC 9997^{T} DSM 17585^{T}

Species of bacterium

Arthrobacter subterraneus is a species of bacteria. It is pale yellow-pigmented, Gram-positive, short rod- or coccus-shaped (diameter between 0.8–1 μm). It is non-motile and non-spore-forming.
