= Arthrobacter crystallopoietes =

Scientific classification
- Domain: Bacteria
- Kingdom: Bacillati
- Phylum: Actinomycetota
- Class: Actinomycetia
- Order: Micrococcales
- Family: Micrococcaceae
- Genus: Arthrobacter
- Species: A. crystallopoietes

Binomial name
- Arthrobacter crystallopoietes Ensign and Rittenberg 1963 (Approved Lists 1980)

Type strain
- ATCC 15481; CIP 102717; DSM 20117; IFO 14235; JCM 2522; LMG 3819; NBRC 14235; VKM Ac-1107

Species of bacterium

Arthrobacter crystallopoietes is a bacterium species from the genus of Arthrobacter which has been isolated from soil. Arthrobacter crystallopoietes has the ability to degrade pyridine.
