= Arthrobacter ginkgonis =

Scientific classification
- Domain: Bacteria
- Kingdom: Bacillati
- Phylum: Actinomycetota
- Class: Actinomycetia
- Order: Micrococcales
- Family: Micrococcaceae
- Genus: Arthrobacter
- Species: A. ginkgonis

Binomial name
- Arthrobacter ginkgonis Cheng et al. 2017

Type strain
- SYP-A7299; DSM 100491; KCTC 39592

Species of bacterium

Arthrobacter ginkgonis is a Gram-positive and aerobic bacterium from the genus of Arthrobacter which has been isolated from rhizosphere soil from the tree Ginkgo biloba in Dandong, China.
