= Arthrobacter cupressi =

Scientific classification
- Domain: Bacteria
- Kingdom: Bacillati
- Phylum: Actinomycetota
- Class: Actinomycetia
- Order: Micrococcales
- Family: Micrococcaceae
- Genus: Arthrobacter
- Species: A. cupressi

Binomial name
- Arthrobacter cupressi Zhang et al. 2012

Type strain
- D48; CGMCC 1.10783; DSM 24664

Synonyms
- Arthrobacter cupressus

Species of bacterium

Arthrobacter cupressi is a Gram-positive and non-motile bacterium species from the genus Arthrobacter which has been isolated from rhizosphere soil from the tree Cupressus sempervirens in Mianyang in Sichuan province, China.
