= Roman Bética Route =

Roman road in Spain

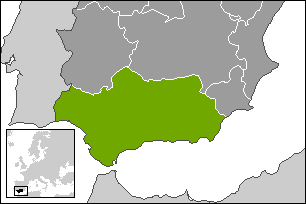
Location Andalusia

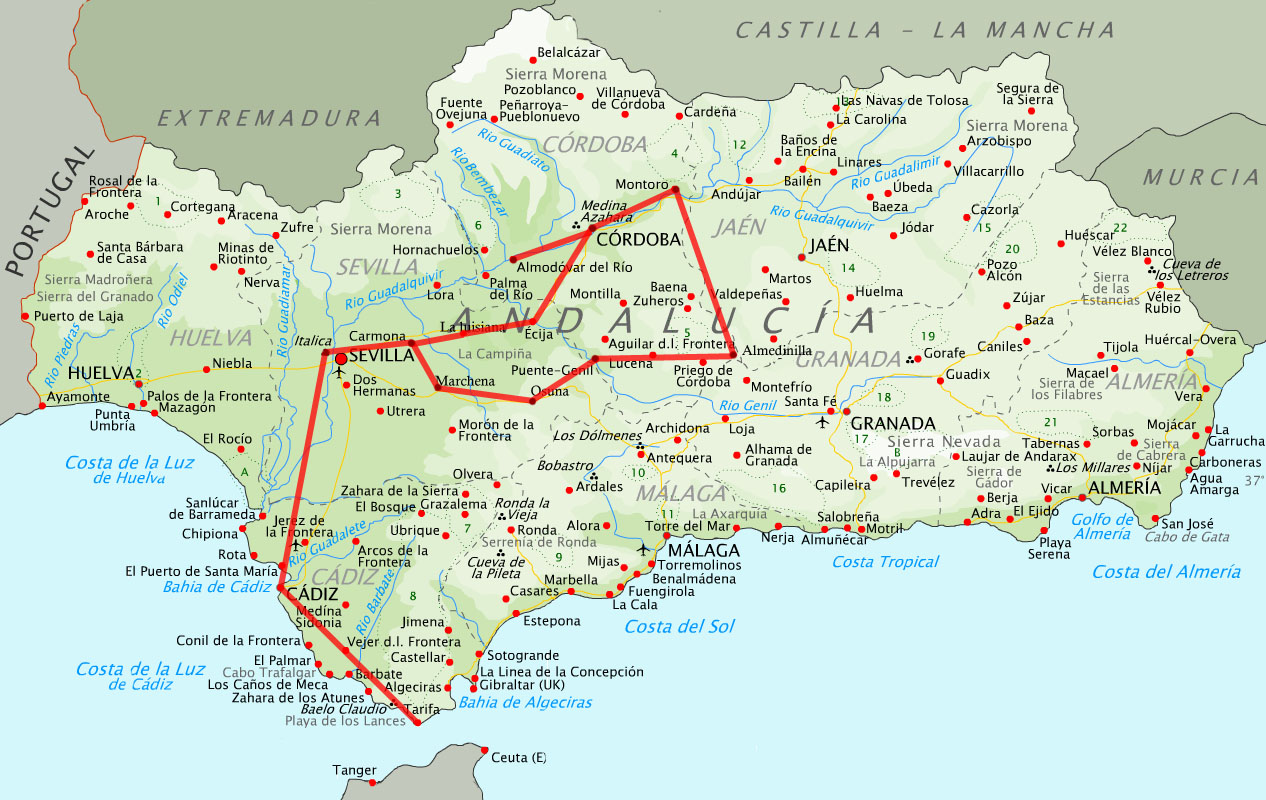
Cities of the route

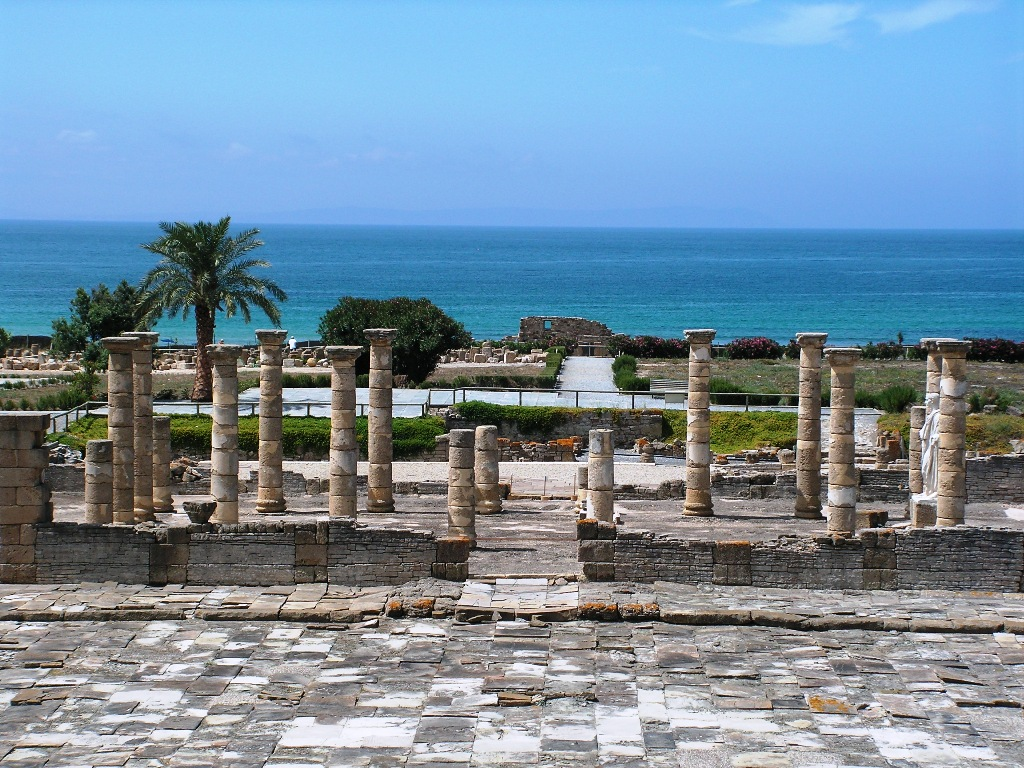
Baelo Claudia in Tarifa

The Roman Bética Route is an ancient Roman road that passes through fourteen cities of the provinces of Seville, Cádiz, and Córdoba in Spain. It runs through the southern part of the Roman province of Hispania and includes territories also traversed by the Via Augusta. On this route are landscapes of geographic and natural interest such as the Natural Park of the Cordovan Subbética, the Bahía de Cádiz Natural Park, and the Valley of the Guadalquivir.

== Cities on the route ==
- Santiponce
- Carmona
- La Luisiana
- Écija
- Almodóvar del Río
- Córdoba
- Montoro
- Almedinilla
- Puente Genil
- Osuna
- Marchena
- Jerez de la Frontera
- Tarifa
- Cádiz
