= Arthrobacter russicus =

Scientific classification
- Domain: Bacteria
- Kingdom: Bacillati
- Phylum: Actinomycetota
- Class: Actinomycetia
- Order: Micrococcales
- Family: Micrococcaceae
- Genus: Arthrobacter
- Species: A. russicus

Binomial name
- Arthrobacter russicus Li et al. 2004

Type strain
- A1-3; GTC 863; JCM 11414; DSM 14555

Species of bacterium

Arthrobacter russicus is a species of Gram-positive bacteria.
