= Arthrobacter koreensis =

Scientific classification
- Domain: Bacteria
- Kingdom: Bacillati
- Phylum: Actinomycetota
- Class: Actinomycetia
- Order: Micrococcales
- Family: Micrococcaceae
- Genus: Arthrobacter
- Species: A. koreensis

Binomial name
- Arthrobacter koreensis Lee et al. 2003

Type strain
- IFO 16787; JCM 12361; KCTC 9922; NBRC 16787; CA15-8

Species of bacterium

Arthrobacter koreensis is an alkalitolerant bacterium species from the genus Arthrobacter which has been isolated from soil from Daejon, Korea.
