= Arthrobacter luteolus =

Scientific classification
- Domain: Bacteria
- Kingdom: Bacillati
- Phylum: Actinomycetota
- Class: Actinomycetia
- Order: Micrococcales
- Family: Micrococcaceae
- Genus: Arthrobacter
- Species: A. luteolus

Binomial name
- Arthrobacter luteolus Wauters et al. 2000

Type strain
- ATCC BAA-272; CF-25; CCUG 43811; CIP 106789; DSM 13067; JCM 11676

Species of bacterium

Arthrobacter luteolus is a bacterium species from the genus Arthrobacter. Its origins came from an isolatation from a human surgical wound in Belgium. Arthrobacter luteolus were found to be in human clinical specimens.
