= Arthrobacter alpinus =

Scientific classification
- Domain: Bacteria
- Kingdom: Bacillati
- Phylum: Actinomycetota
- Class: Actinomycetia
- Order: Micrococcales
- Family: Micrococcaceae
- Genus: Arthrobacter
- Species: A. alpinus

Binomial name
- Arthrobacter alpinus Zhang et al. 2010

Type strain
- CGMCC 1.8950; DSM 22274; JCM 17736; S6-3

Species of bacterium

Arthrobacter alpinus is a psychrotrophic, Gram-positive and aerobic bacterium species from the genus Arthrobacter which has been isolated from alpine soil from the Grossglockner area from the mountain range Hohe Tauern, in Austria.
