= Arthrobacter deserti =

Scientific classification
- Domain: Bacteria
- Kingdom: Bacillati
- Phylum: Actinomycetota
- Class: Actinomycetes
- Order: Micrococcales
- Family: Micrococcaceae
- Genus: Arthrobacter
- Species: A. deserti

Binomial name
- Arthrobacter deserti Hu et al. 2016

Type strain
- YIM CS25; CGMCC 1.15091; KCTC 39544

Species of bacterium

Arthrobacter deserti is a Gram-positive, rod-shaped and non-motile bacterium species from the genus Arthrobacter which has been isolated from desert soil from the Turpan desert in China. The type strain for this specific bacterium is YIM CS25T. Arthrobacter deserti contains lysine in its peptidoglycan layer. This species of Arthrobacter is aerobic. The cells were non-sporulating and rod-to-coccus shaped. The cells are known to use at least 36 different types of carbon sources. The predominant menaquinone is MK-9(H_{2}). The genomic DNA G+C content of the type strain is 68.3 mol%.

== Characteristics of Arthrobacter deserti ==
Morphological, physiological, and biochemical characteristics of Arthrobacter deserti are shown in the Table below.

Test type	Test	Characteristics
Colony characters	Color	White
Colony characters	Shape	Rod
Colony characters	Temperature for growth (°C)	15-40
Colony characters	pH range for growth	6-8
Colony characters	NaCl tolerance (%, w/v)	0-6
Morphological characters	Shape	Rod-Coccus
Physiological characters	Motility	No
Physiological characters	Growth at 6.5% NaCl	Yes
Biochemical characters	Gram staining	+
Biochemical characters	Oxidase	-
Biochemical characters	Catalase	+
Biochemical characters	Motility	-
Biochemical characters	Indole	-
Biochemical characters	Urease	-
Biochemical characters	Nitrate Reduction	-
Hydrolysis of	Gelatin	+
Hydrolysis of	Starch	-
Hydrolysis of	Tween 40	+
Hydrolysis of	Tween 60	-
Hydrolysis of	Tween 80	-
Acid production from	Glycerol	+
Acid production from	1,2,3,4-butaneterol	+
Acid production from	Ribose	+
Acid production from	Cellobiose	+
Acid production from	Raffinose	+
Acid production from	Mannitol	+
Acid production from	N-Acetylglucosamine	+
Acid production from	Amygdalin	+
Acid production from	Tagatose	+
Acid production from	Melibiose	+
Acid production from	Trehalose	+
Acid production from	Gluconate	+
Acid production from	Turanose	+

Note: + = Positive, - = Negative
