= Arthrobacter halodurans =

Scientific classification
- Domain: Bacteria
- Kingdom: Bacillati
- Phylum: Actinomycetota
- Class: Actinomycetia
- Order: Micrococcales
- Family: Micrococcaceae
- Genus: Arthrobacter
- Species: A. halodurans

Binomial name
- Arthrobacter halodurans Chen et al. 2012

Type strain
- JSM 078085; DSM 21081; KCTC 19430

Species of bacterium

Arthrobacter halodurans is a Gram-positive, aerobic, halotolerant and non-motile bacterium species from the genus Arthrobacter which has been isolated from seawater from the South China Sea near Naozhou Island, China.
