= Arthrobacter roseus =

Scientific classification
- Domain: Bacteria
- Kingdom: Bacillati
- Phylum: Actinomycetota
- Class: Actinomycetia
- Order: Micrococcales
- Family: Micrococcaceae
- Genus: Arthrobacter
- Species: A. roseus

Binomial name
- Arthrobacter roseus Reddy et al. 2002

Type strain
- CIP 107726; CMC 90or CMS90; CMS 90or CMS 90r DSM 14508; JCM 11881; MTCC 3712; NCIMB 14039

Species of bacterium

Arthrobacter roseus is a species of red-pigmented psychrophilic bacteria first isolated from a cyanobacterial mat.
