= Arthrobacter alkaliphilus =

Scientific classification
- Domain: Bacteria
- Kingdom: Bacillati
- Phylum: Actinomycetota
- Class: Actinomycetes
- Order: Micrococcales
- Family: Micrococcaceae
- Genus: Arthrobacter
- Species: A. alkaliphilus

Binomial name
- Arthrobacter alkaliphilus Ding et al. 2009

Type strain
- CCTCC AB 206013, IAM 15383, JCM 21827, LC6

Species of bacterium

Arthrobacter alkaliphilus is a Gram-positive and non-spore-forming bacterium species from the genus of Arthrobacter which has been isolated from filtrations from a volcanic rock in Niigata in Japan.

== Cell Morphology and Features ==
Arthrobacter alkaliphilus is a non-motile, Gram-positive bacteria that demonstrates a rod-coccus growth cycle. This was first observed upon culture of bacteria in Genus Arthrobacter where a young culture demonstrated an irregular rod shape which was replaced in older cultures by a coccoid form. When those older cultures were placed in a new media they again produced irregular rod shapes. It is this characteristic that makes Arthrobacter bacteria unique and hard to identify. In a culture of an Arthrobacter alkaliphilus colony scientists observed a round, convex, and glossy appearance with entire margins and a light yellow color. After 2–7 days the culture shows mostly coccoid cells that are 0.6–1.0 micrometers in diameter. In most Arthrobacter bacteria the fatty acids found are primarily iso- and anteiso-branched which refers to a branch on the antepenultimate carbon atom of a saturated fatty acid chain. Initial testing of bacteria found in volcanic rock showed that the major fatty acid was anteiso-C15 : 0 and the major amino acid present in the cell wall peptidoglycan was l-lysine a common amino acid used in the structure of many living organisms. Biochemical characteristics were assessed by Linxian Ding, Taketo Hirose, and Akira Yokota showing results for alkaline and a number of enzymes including; acid phosphatase, catalase, esterase lipase C8, leucine arylamidase, valine arylamidase, typsin, naphthol-AS-BI-phosphohydrolase, alpha- and beta-glucuronidase, alpha-glucosidase, alpha-mannosidase, pyrazinamidase, pyrrolidonyl arylamidase, and urease.

== Phylogeny and genome evolution ==
This bacteria belongs to Phylum Actinomycetota, Class Actinomycetia, Order Micrococcaceae, Family Micrococcaceae, and Genus Arthrobacter. Shown below is the genome evolution for Arthrobacter alkaliphilus. Also shown is the 1457 bp sequence length and corresponding GC content which is 60 mol%.

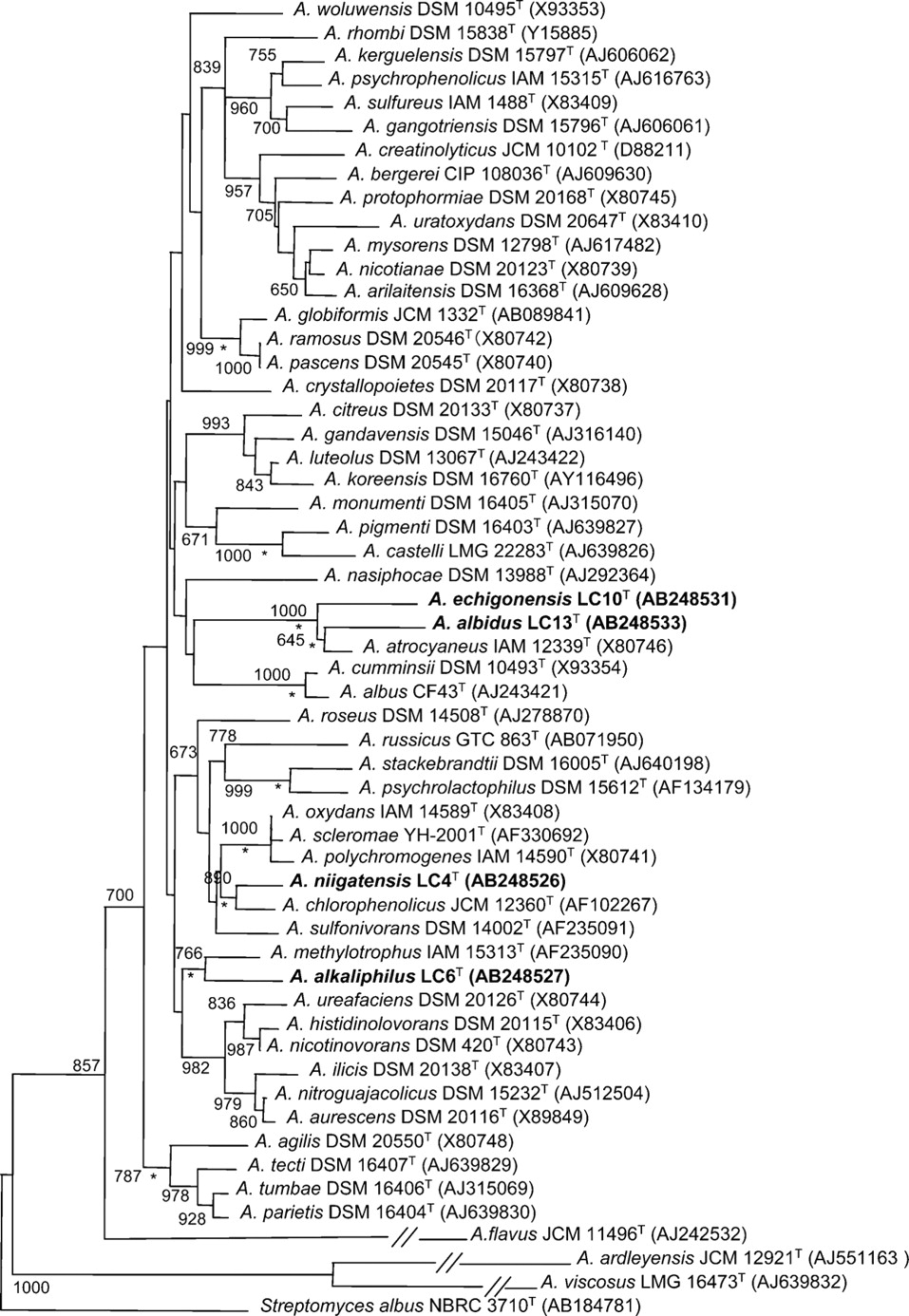
Phylogenetic tree for the genus Arthrobacter

       1 tggctcagga tgaacgctgg cggcgtgctt aacacatgca agtcgaacga tgaagcctag
      61 cttgctgggt ggattaggtg gcgaacgggt gagtaacacg tgagtaacct gcccttgact
     121 ctgggataag cctgggaaac tgggtctaat accggatatg actgctccgc gcatgcggtg
     181 gtggtggaaa gcttttgcgg ttttggatgg actcgcggcc tatcagcttg ttggtggggt
     241 aatggcctac caaggcgacg acgggtagcc ggcctgagag ggtgaccggc cacactggga
     301 ctgagacacg gcccagactc ctacgggagg cagcagtggg gaatattgca caatgggcgc
     361 aagcctgatg cagcgacgcc gcgtgaggga tgacggcctt cgggttgtaa acctctttca
     421 gtagggaaga agctttcggg tgacggtacc tgcagaagaa gcgccggcta actacgtgcc
     481 agcagccgcg gtaatacgta gggcgcaagc gttatccgga attattgggc gtaaagagct
     541 cgtaggcggt ttgtcgcgtc tgctgtgaaa gaccggggct caactccggt tctgcagtgg
     601 gtacgggcag actagagtga tgtaggggag actggaattc ctggtgtagc ggtgaaatgc
     661 gcagatatca ggaggaacac cgatggcgaa ggcaggtctc tgggcattaa ctgacgctga
     721 ggagcgaaag catggggagc gaacaggatt agataccctg gtagtccatg ccgtaaacgt
     781 tgggcactag gtgtggggga cattccacgt tttccgcgcc gtagctaacg cattaagtgc
     841 cccgcctggg gagtacggcc gcaaggctaa aactcaaagg aattgacggg ggcccgcaca
     901 agcggcggag catgcggatt aattcgatgc aacgcgaaga accttaccaa ggcttgacat
     961 ggactagtaa gacgcagaaa tgtgttcccc tctttgaggc tggtttacag gtggtgcatg
    1021 gttgtcgtca gctcgtgtcg tgagatgttg ggttaagtcc cgcaacgagc gcaaccctcg
    1081 ttctatgttg ccagcggttc ggccggggac tcataggaga ctgccggggt caactcggag
    1141 gaaggtgggg acgacgtcaa atcatcatgc cccttatgtc ttgggcttca cgcatgctac
    1201 aatggccggt acaaagggtt gcgatactgt gaggtggagc taatcccaaa aagccggtct
    1261 cagttcggat tggggtctgc aactcgaccc catgaagtcg gagtcgctag taatcgcaga
    1321 tcagcaacgc tgcggtgaat acgttcccgg gccttgtaca caccgcccgt caagtcacga
    1381 aagttggtaa cacccgaagc cggtggccta acccttgtgg agggagccgt cgaaggtggg
    1441 accggcgatt gggacta[8]

== Metabolic details ==
The BacDive is a worldwide database that uses cultured data demonstrating Arthrobacter’s metabolism and physiology. Arthrobacter is a gram-positive bacterium and it requires oxygen to fully utilize its carbon diet. It can consume glucose, lactose, maltose, mannitol, and ribose. Arthrobacter alkaliphilus is a subtype of Athrobacter that can degrade lindane and use it as a carbon source. It utilizes acid phosphatase, alkaline phosphatase, alpha-galactosidase, catalase, Pyrazinamidase, and urease. It is commonly found in volcanic rock at an optimal pH of 8.5, 3-7% NaCl, and a temperature of 30 °C. It cannot form spores for reproduction.

== Relevance to broader system ==
The genus Arthrobacter is a member of the family Micrococcaceae and compared to other genera of the family, it contains the highest number of species. This contributes to the fact that species within Arthrobacter are metabolically versatile and can be found in diverse environments. Understanding this genus is essential to understanding the impact each has on its environment. The primary impact each has is its ability to degrade different environmental pollutants. One such pollutant, lindane, has shown to accumulate in the adipose tissue of different organisms and is very toxic to aquatic organisms and somewhat toxic to mammals and birds. Arthrobacter Alkaliphilus’ ability to degrade lindane can then have a major impact on its ecosystem.
