= Arthrobacter nanjingensis =

Scientific classification
- Domain: Bacteria
- Kingdom: Bacillati
- Phylum: Actinomycetota
- Class: Actinomycetia
- Order: Micrococcales
- Family: Micrococcaceae
- Genus: Arthrobacter
- Species: A. nanjingensis

Binomial name
- Arthrobacter nanjingensis Huang et al. 2015

Type strain
- A33; CCTCC AB 2014069; DSM 28237

Species of bacterium

Arthrobacter nanjingensis is a Gram-positive and non-motile bacterium species from the genus Arthrobacter which has been isolated from forest soil in Nanjing in Jiangsu Province, China.
