= Arthrobacter pigmenti =

Scientific classification
- Domain: Bacteria
- Kingdom: Bacillati
- Phylum: Actinomycetota
- Class: Actinomycetia
- Order: Micrococcales
- Family: Micrococcaceae
- Genus: Arthrobacter
- Species: A. pigmenti

Binomial name
- Arthrobacter pigmenti Heyrman et al. 2005

Type strain
- DSM 16403; JCM 21771; LMG 22284

Species of bacterium

Arthrobacter pigmenti is a bacterium species from the genus of Arthrobacter which has been isolated from a biofilm from a mural painting in Herberstein, Austria.
