= Arthrobacter cryoconiti =

Scientific classification
- Domain: Bacteria
- Kingdom: Bacillati
- Phylum: Actinomycetota
- Class: Actinomycetia
- Order: Micrococcales
- Family: Micrococcaceae
- Genus: Arthrobacter
- Species: A. cryoconiti

Binomial name
- Arthrobacter cryoconiti Margesin et al. 2012

Type strain
- Cr6-08; CGMCC 1.10698; DSM 23324; LMG 26052

Species of bacterium

Arthrobacter cryoconiti is a psychrophilic, Gram-positive, aerobic and non-motile bacterium species from the genus Arthrobacter which has been isolated from cryoconite from the Banker glacier in the Ötztaler Alpen in Austria.
