= Arthrobacter rhombi =

Scientific classification
- Domain: Bacteria
- Kingdom: Bacillati
- Phylum: Actinomycetota
- Class: Actinomycetia
- Order: Micrococcales
- Family: Micrococcaceae
- Genus: Arthrobacter
- Species: A. rhombi

Binomial name
- Arthrobacter rhombi Osorio et al. 1999

Type strain
- CCUG 38813; CIP 107337; Collins F.58.3CB.57; DSM 15838; F.58.3CB.57; F.98.3HR.69; JCM 11678; LMG 22201; NCIMB 13909

Species of bacterium

Arthrobacter rhombi is a Gram-positive, aerobic, non-spore-forming and non-motile bacterium species from the genus Arthrobacter which has been isolated from the halibut, Reinhardtius hippoglossoides.
