= Arthrobacter humicola =

Scientific classification
- Domain: Bacteria
- Kingdom: Bacillati
- Phylum: Actinomycetota
- Class: Actinomycetia
- Order: Micrococcales
- Family: Micrococcaceae
- Genus: Arthrobacter
- Species: A. humicola

Binomial name
- Arthrobacter humicola Kageyama et al. 2008

Type strain
- KV-653; JCM 15921; NBRC 102056; NRRL B-24479

Species of bacterium

Arthrobacter humicola is a Gram-positive bacterium species from the genus Arthrobacter which has been isolated from soil in Japan.
