= Arthrobacter gandavensis =

Scientific classification
- Domain: Bacteria
- Kingdom: Bacillati
- Phylum: Actinomycetota
- Class: Actinomycetia
- Order: Micrococcales
- Family: Micrococcaceae
- Genus: Arthrobacter
- Species: A. gandavensis

Binomial name
- Arthrobacter gandavensis Storms et al. 2003

Type strain
- R5812; DSM 15046; JCM 13316; LMG 21285

Species of bacterium

Arthrobacter gandavensis is a Gram-positive bacterium species from the genus Arthrobacter which has been isolated from mastitic milk in Belgium.
