= Arthrobacter stackebrandtii =

Scientific classification
- Domain: Bacteria
- Kingdom: Bacillati
- Phylum: Actinomycetota
- Class: Actinomycetia
- Order: Micrococcales
- Family: Micrococcaceae
- Genus: Arthrobacter
- Species: A. stackebrandtii

Binomial name
- Arthrobacter stackebrandtii Tvrzová et al. 2005

Type strain
- Antheunisse AC 386; CCM 2783; CIP 108701; DSM 16005; AM 15316; J. Antheunisse AC 836; JCM 14116; LMG 16145

Species of bacterium

Arthrobacter stackebrandtii is a bacterium species from the genus Arthrobacter which has been isolated from poultry litter in the Netherlands.
