= Arthrobacter liuii =

Scientific classification
- Domain: Bacteria
- Kingdom: Bacillati
- Phylum: Actinomycetota
- Class: Actinomycetes
- Order: Micrococcales
- Family: Micrococcaceae
- Genus: Arthrobacter
- Species: A. liuii

Binomial name
- Arthrobacter liuii Yu et al. 2015

Type strain
- DSXY973; CGMCC1.12778; JCM 19864

Species of bacterium

Arthrobacter liuii is a gram-positive, aerobic and non-motile bacterium species from the genus Arthrobacter which has been isolated from desert soil from Xinjiang, China.
