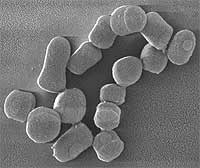
- Arthrobacter chlorophenolicus

Scientific classification
- Domain: Bacteria
- Kingdom: Bacillati
- Phylum: Actinomycetota
- Class: Actinomycetes
- Order: Micrococcales
- Family: Micrococcaceae
- Genus: Arthrobacter; Conn and Dimmick 1947 (Approved Lists 1980)

Type species
- Arthrobacter globiformis corrig. (Conn 1928) Conn and Dimmick 1947 (Approved Lists 1980)

Species
- See text.

= Arthrobacter =

Genus of bacteria

Arthrobacter (from the Greek, "jointed small stick”) is a genus of bacteria that is commonly found in soil. Members of the genus have also been reported from insect-associated environments, suggesting ecological roles beyond soil habitats. All species in this genus are Gram-positive obligate aerobes that are rods during exponential growth and cocci in their stationary phase. Arthrobacter have a distinctive method of cell division called "snapping division" or reversion in which the outer bacterial cell wall ruptures at a joint.

== Description ==
Arthrobacter can be grown on mineral salts pyridone broth, where colonies have a greenish metallic center on incubated at 20 °C (68 °F). Under the microscope, Arthrobacter appear as rods when rapidly dividing, and cocci when in stationary phase. Dividing cells may also appear as chevrons ("V" shapes). Other notable characteristics are that it can use pyridone as its sole carbon source, and that its cocci are resistant to desiccation and starvation.

== Use in industry ==
Arthrobacter, like other bacterial genera including Brevibacterium, Microbacterium, and Corynebacterium are used for industrial production of L-glutamate. In industrial applications, Arthrobacter is often grown with low-cost sugar sources such as cane or beet molasses, starch hydrolysates from corn or cassava tubers, or tapioca. Along with sugar, ammonia and ammonium salts are added as a nitrogen source. The vitamins, minerals, and some other types of nutrients can be provided by adding corn steep liquour.

== Other uses ==
Various Arthrobacter species have been investigated for other commercial applications. A. crystallopoietes and A. chlorophenolicus have been shown to reduce hexavalent chromium and 4-chlorophenol levels in contaminated soil, suggesting they may be useful for bioremediation. Similarly, Arthrobacter sp. strain R1 (American Type Culture Collection strain number 49987) has been shown to grow on a variety of aromatic compounds, including homocyclic compounds, such as hydroxybenzoates, as well as N-heterocycles, including pyridine and picoline.

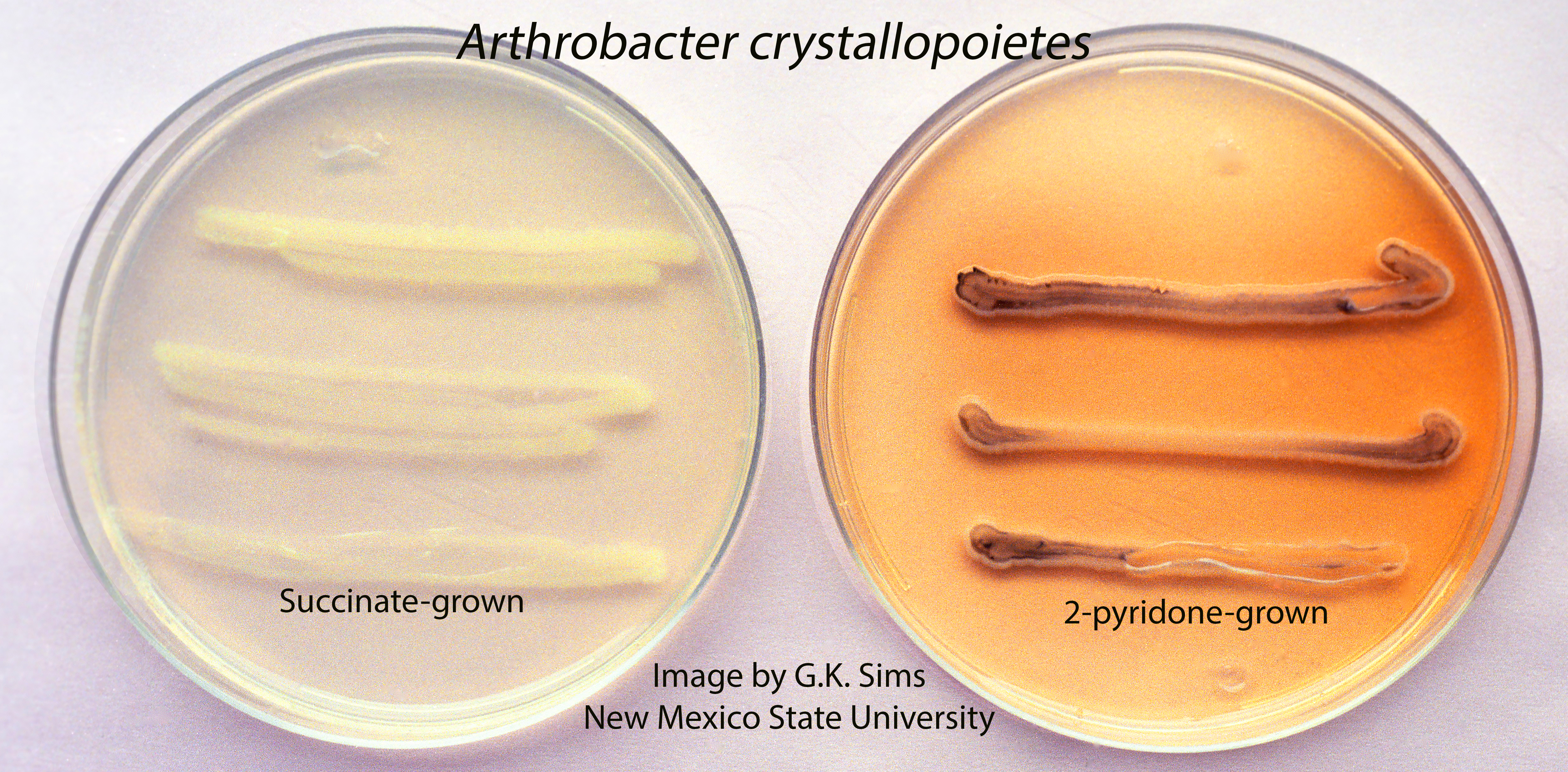
Arthrobacter crystallopoietes produces a pigment when grown on 2-pyridone (right) but not when grown on succinic acid (left).

Arthrobacter sp. H65-7 produces the enzyme inulase II that converts inulin into the medically relevant nutrient difructose anhydride.

The enzyme Alu obtained from Arthrobacter luteus is able to cleave Alu sequences which is frequently repeated in human DNA.

== Species ==
Arthrobacter comprises the following species:

- A. agilis (Ali-Cohen 1889) Koch et al. 1995
- A. alkaliphilus Ding et al. 2009
- A. alpinus Zhang et al. 2010
- A. bambusae Park et al. 2014
- A. bussei Flegler et al. 2020
- "A. casei" Wenning et al. 2006
- A. castelli Heyrman et al. 2005
- A. celericrescens Yan et al. 2019
- A. cheniae Yang et al. 2021
- A. citreus Sacks 1954 (Approved Lists 1980)
- "A. crusticola" Liu et al. 2020
- "A. crygenae" Vasil'eva et al. 1998
- A. cryoconiti Margesin et al. 2012
- A. crystallopoietes Ensign and Rittenberg 1963 (Approved Lists 1980)
- A. cupressi Zhang et al. 2012
- A. deserti Hu et al. 2016
- "A. dextranlyticum" Hatada et al. 2004
- "A. dokdonellae" Koh et al. 2019
- A. echini Lee et al. 2016
- A. flavus Reddy et al. 2000
- A. frigidicola Yang et al. 2021
- A. gandavensis Storms et al. 2003
- A. ginkgonis Cheng et al. 2017
- "A. ginsengisoli" Siddiqi et al. 2014
- A. glacialis Liu et al. 2019
- A. globiformis corrig. (Conn 1928) Conn and Dimmick 1947 (Approved Lists 1980)
- A. gyeryongensis Hoang et al. 2014
- A. halodurans Chen et al. 2012
- A. humicola Kageyama et al. 2008
- "A. ipsi" Gonzalez-Dominici et al. 2021
- A. jiangjiafuii Zhang et al. 2022
- "A. keyseri" Eaton 2001
- A. koreensis Lee et al. 2003
- A. liuii Yu et al. 2015
- A. livingstonensis Ganzert et al. 2011
- A. luteolus Wauters et al. 2000
- "A. luteus" Kaneko et al. 1969
- A. methylotrophus Borodina et al. 2002
- A. mobilis Ye et al. 2020
- A. monumenti Heyrman et al. 2005
- A. nanjingensis uang et al. 2015
- "A. nitrophenolicus" Arora and Jain 2013
- A. oryzae Kageyama et al. 2008
- A. paludis Zhang et al. 2018
- "A. paraffineus" Duvnjak et al. 1982
- A. parietis Heyrman et al. 2005
- A. pascens Lochhead and Burton 1953 (Approved Lists 1980)
- "A. photogonimos" Phinney and Hoober 1992
- A. pigmenti Heyrman et al. 2005
- A. pityocampae İnce et al. 2014
- A. pokkalii Krishnan et al. 2017
- A. psychrochitiniphilus Wang et al. 2009
- A. psychrolactophilus Loveland-Curtze et al. 2000
- A. ramosus Jensen 1960 (Approved Lists 1980)
- A. rhombi Osorio et al. 1999
- A. roseus Reddy et al. 2002
- A. ruber Liu et al. 2018
- A. russicus Li et al. 2004
- "A. saudimassiliensis" Papadioti et al. 2017
- "A. sedimenti" Lin et al. 2020
- "A. senegalensis" Ndiaye et al. 2019
- A. silvisoli Yan et al. 2018
- A. silviterrae Lee et al. 2017
- A. stackebrandtii Tvrzová et al. 2005
- A. subterraneus Chang et al. 2008
- "A. sulfonylureivorans" Han et al. 2021
- A. sunyaminii Zhang et al. 2022
- A. tecti Heyrman et al. 2005
- "A. terrae" Jiang et al. 2022
- A. terricola Trinh and Kim 2021
- A. tumbae Heyrman et al. 2005
- A. ulcerisalmonis Kämpfer et al. 2020
- "A. wenxiniae" Sun et al. 2022
- A. woluwensis Funke et al. 1997
- A. yangruifuii Ge et al. 2020
- A. zhaoguopingii Ge et al. 2020
