= Arthrobacter silviterrae =

Scientific classification
- Domain: Bacteria
- Kingdom: Bacillati
- Phylum: Actinomycetota
- Class: Actinomycetia
- Order: Micrococcales
- Family: Micrococcaceae
- Genus: Arthrobacter
- Species: A. silviterrae

Binomial name
- Arthrobacter silviterrae Lee et al. 2017

Type strain
- DSM 27180; KACC 17303; NBRC 109660; KIS14-16

Species of bacterium

Arthrobacter silviterrae is a Gram-positive bacterium from the genus Arthrobacter which has been isolated from forest soil from Ongjin, Korea.
