= Convento de Santa Clara (Carmona) =

Building in Carmona, Spain

Coordinates: 37.4743°N 5.6363°W

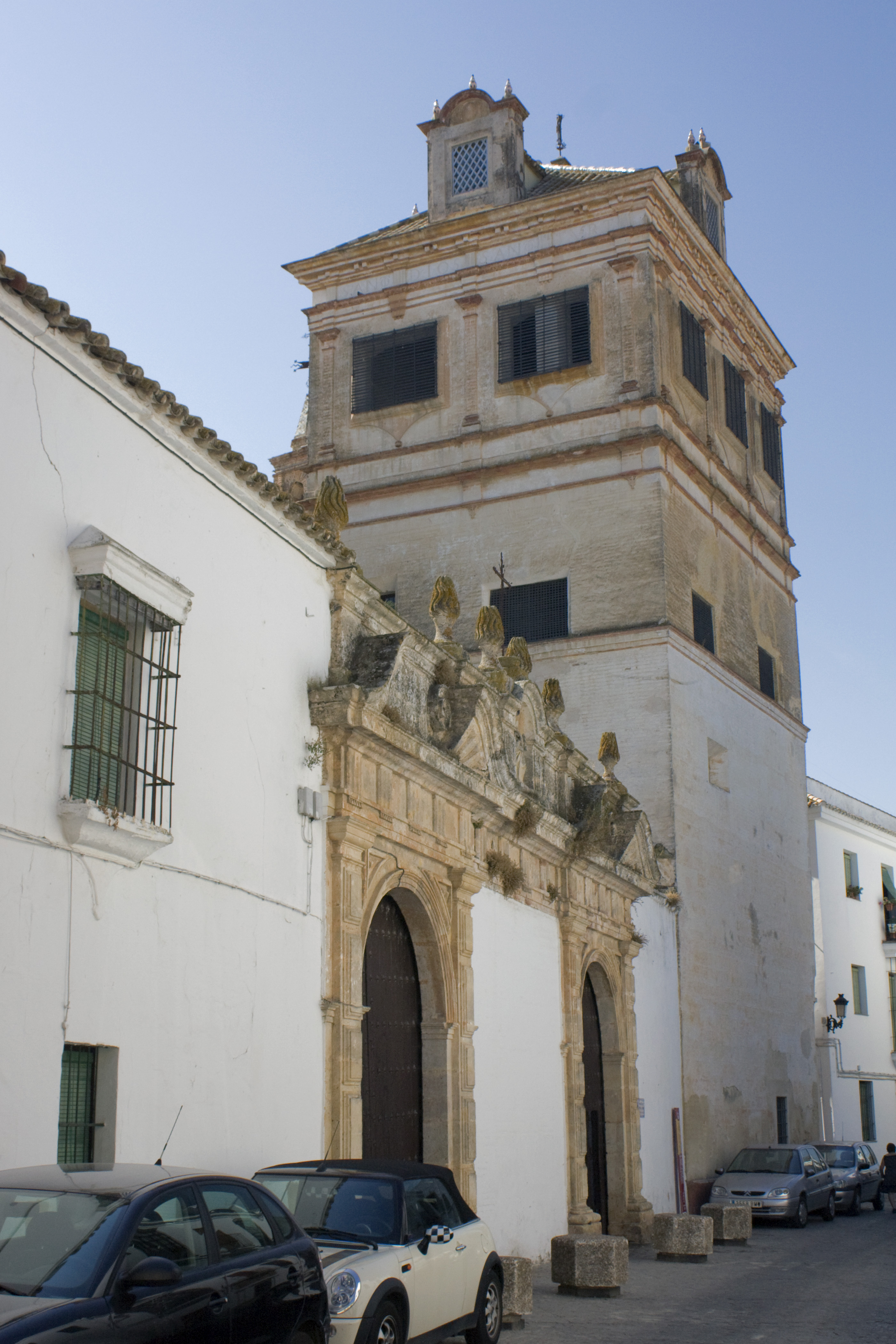
Convento de Santa Clara

Convento de Santa Clara (Convent of Santa Clara) is located in Carmona, Spain. Founded in 1460, it was one of the first to be built in the convent architecture style of the city. It enjoyed papal and royal privileges throughout its history. Design changes in the 15th through18th centuries, preserved without undergoing major changes, distorted the structure considerably from its original appearance. The church and cloister are important examples of Andalusian Moorish architecture of the early 16th century. The Mudéjar church underwent renovation in 1664 in the Baroque style. Six depictions of the life of St Clare are by Juan de Valdés Leal. Twelve virgin saints from the workshop of Francisco de Zurbarán line the walls of the nave.
