= VRBD agar =

VRDBA, VRDB Agar, or Violet Red Bile Dextrose Agar, is a microbiological growth medium. It can be used in agar plates to monitor or assess bacterial growth in the laboratory, particularly the growth of Enterobacteriaceae, for which it is selective.
