= Convento de Santa Clara (Burgos) =

Convent in Castile and León, Spain

Coordinates: 42°20′13″N 3°41′44″W

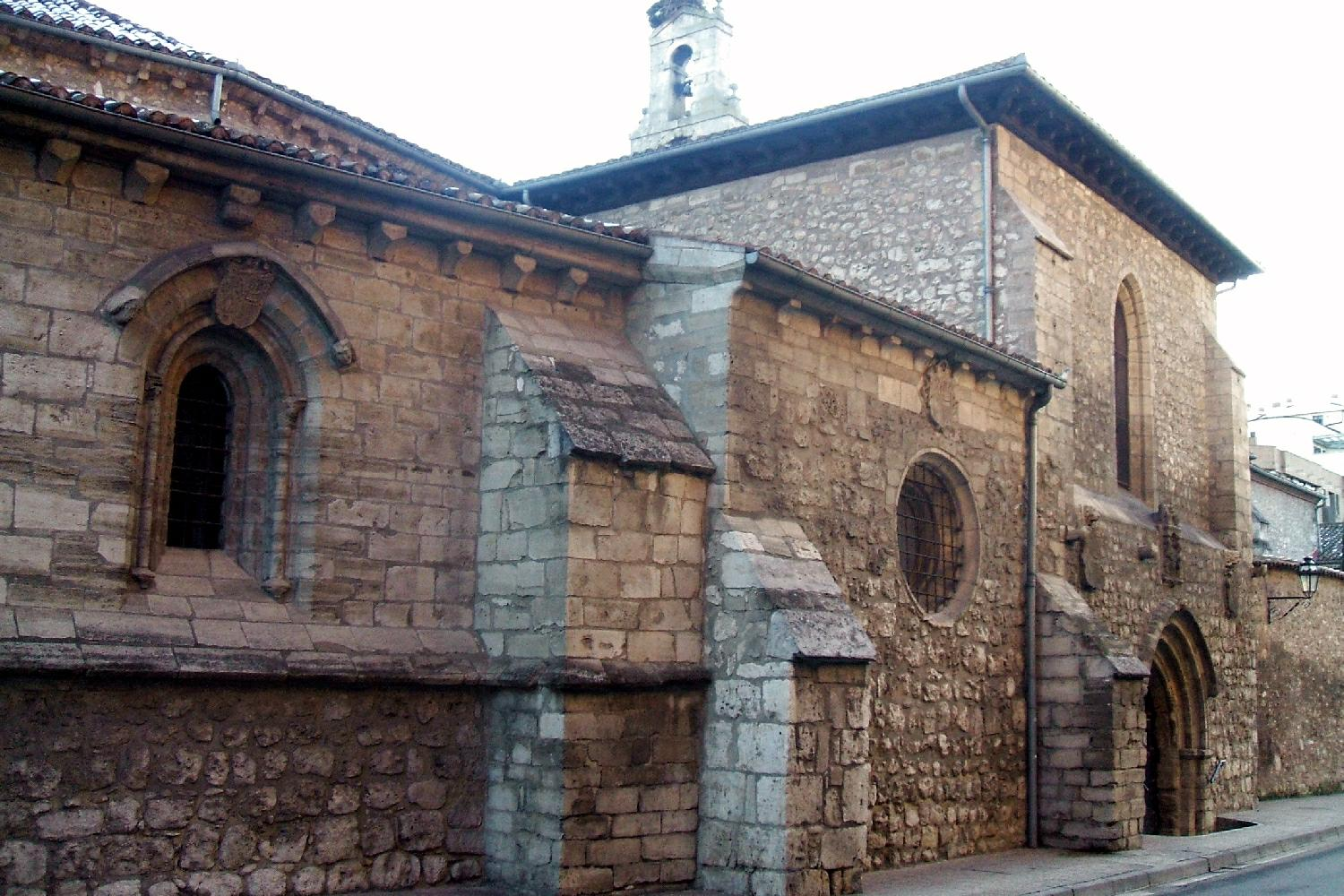
Convento de Santa Clara

The Iglesia del Carmen de Burgos is a nun's convent in Burgos, Castile and León, Spain. It is situated on the corner of Calle de Covarrubias, del Progreso and Santa Clara. It is a Gothic edifice built mostly in the thirteenth century, at the time of its founding, when it was part of the Monasterio de Santa María la Real de Las Huelgas. It dates to 1234.
