= Tomb of Servilia =

Ancient site in Carmona, Spain

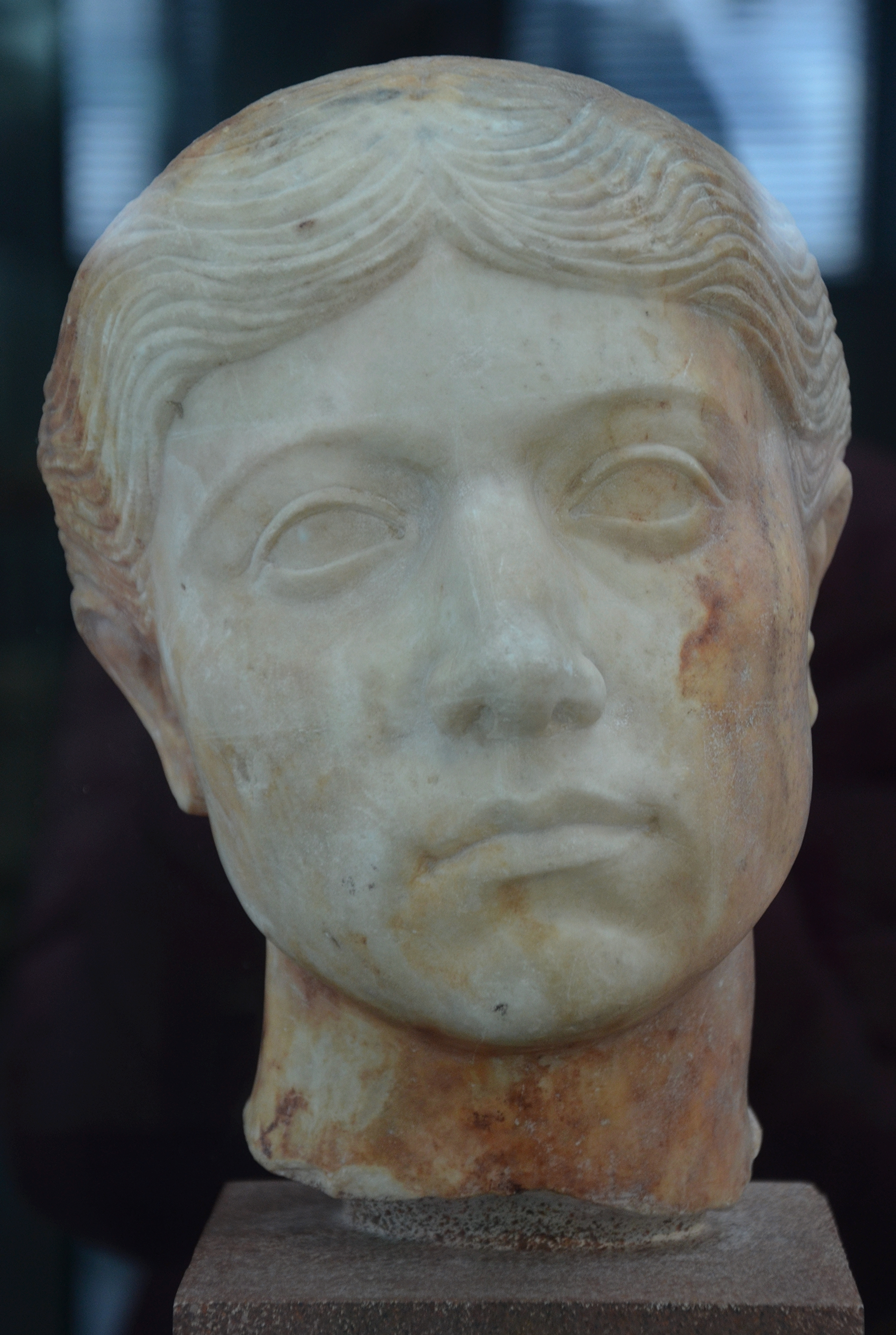
Head of Servilia's statue.

The tomb of Servilia is an Ancient Roman tomb located in Carmona, Spain.

== See also ==
- History of Carmona, Spain
