= Carmona, Spain =

Carmona
- Municipality
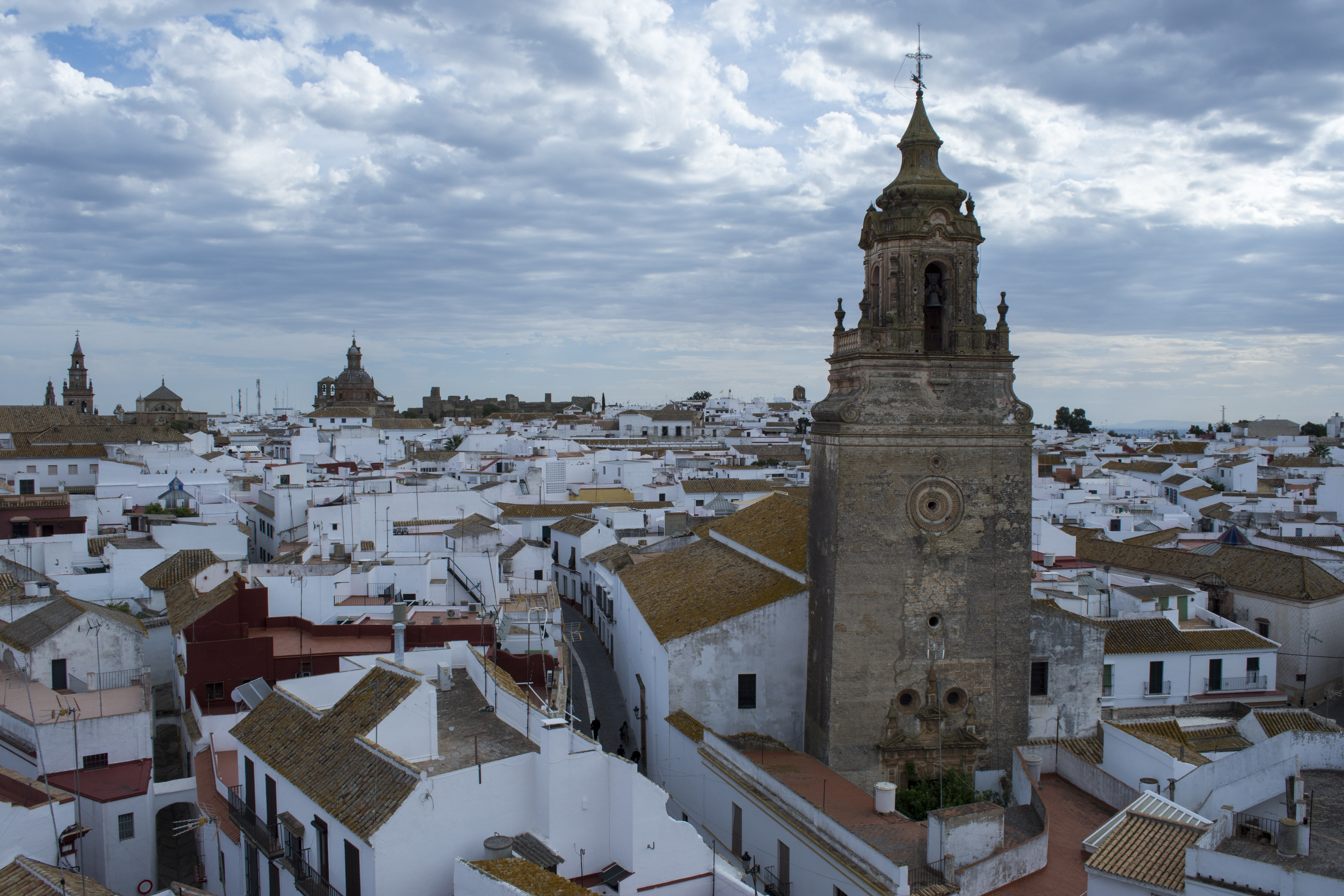

- Flag Coat of arms

- Location in Spain Carmona (Spain)
- Coordinates: 37°28′N 5°38′W
- Country: Spain
- Autonomous community: Andalusia
- Province: Seville

Government
  - Mayor: Juan Ávila Gutiérrez (PP)

Area
  - Total: 924.12 km^{2} (356.80 sq mi)
- Elevation: 253 m (830 ft)

Population (2025-01-01)
  - Total: 30,240
  - Density: 32.72/km^{2} (84.75/sq mi)
- Demonym: Carmonense or Carmonés
- Time zone: UTC+1 (CET)
  - Summer (DST): UTC+2 (CEST)
- Postal code: 41410
- Website: Official website

Carmona is a town of southwestern Spain, in the province of Seville; it lies 33 km north-east of Seville.

Carmona is built on a ridge overlooking the central plain of Andalusia; to the north is the Sierra Morena, with the peak of San Cristobal to the south. The city is known for its thriving trade in wine, olive oil, grain and cattle, and holds an annual fair in April.

It is ascribed both to the comarca of Campiña de Carmona and the comarca of Los Alcores.

== Geography ==
=== Location ===
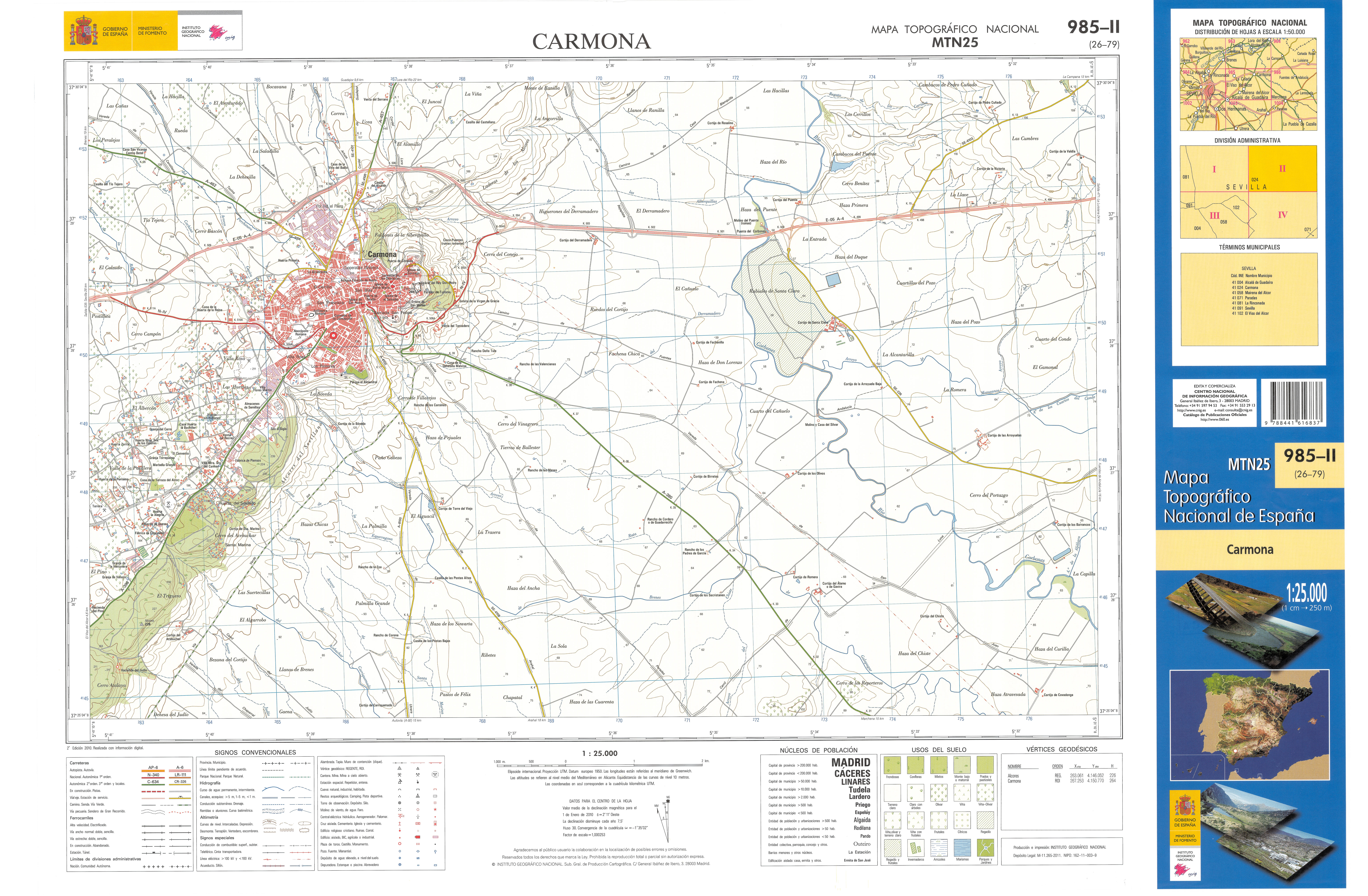
Sheet of the IGN's National Topographical Map of Spain (2010) corresponding to Carmona (1:25000).

Carmona is located in the southwest of the Iberian Peninsula. It lies at about 249 metres above sea level, on a NE–SO ridge at the northeastern end of Los Alcores tableland, dominating over the meadows of the Corbones river, a left-bank tributary of the Guadalquivir.

=== Climate ===
Carmona has a Mediterranean climate with a sunny spring and typically some rain in that season. In October, the average temperature ranges from a minimum of 13 °C to a maximum of 26 °C. The city experiences a moderate level of annual precipitation and has pleasant winter temperatures.

== History ==
Carmona was originally a Tartessian-Turdetani settlement. With the arrival of Phoenician traders from Tyre, Carmona was transformed into a city, known by them Qrt-Ḥmn (Phoenician: 𐤒𐤓𐤕 𐤇𐤌𐤍), meaning "City of Hammon". Centuries later, it became a Roman stronghold of Hispania Baetica. It was known as Carmo in the time of Julius Caesar (100–44 BC). The city was further fortified during the long occupation of the Moors, who erected walls around it, and built fountains and palaces within.

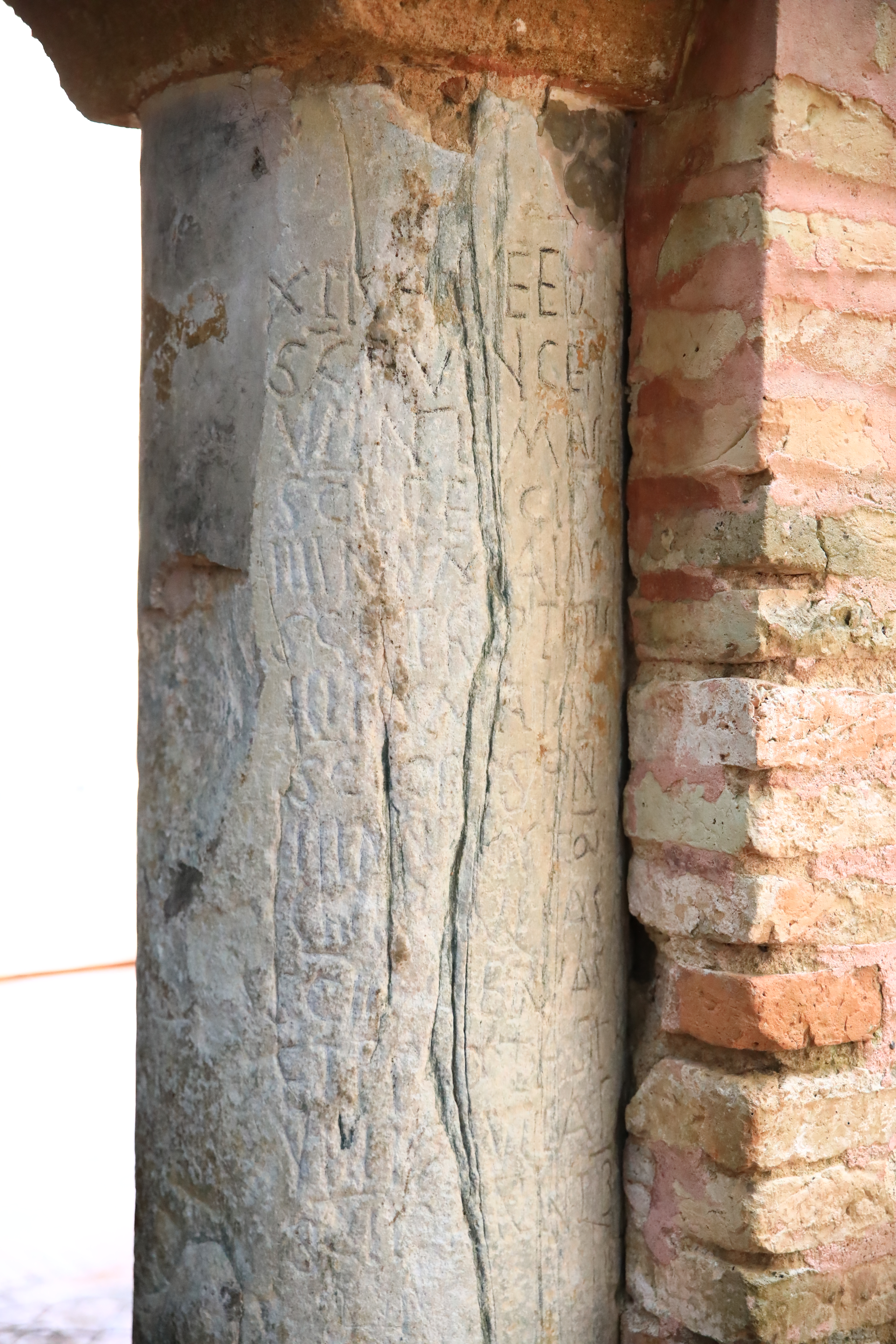
A column with visigothic epigraphy, in the courtyard of Santa María de la Asunción church.

Following the demise of the Caliphate of Córdoba in the early 11th century, Carmona (Qarmūna) was seized by Hammudid Berbers, and then by the also Berber Birzalid clan, becoming the head of the Taifa of Carmona, a petty kingdom, which was conquered by the Abbadid Taifa of Seville by 1067. An Almoravid stronghold after the Almoravid conquest of the Taifa of Seville, it was finally subdued by the Almohads after a settlement. It was briefly occupied by Ibn Hamusk, before reverting to the Almohads in 1161.

In 1247, Ferdinand III of Castile captured the town, and bestowed on it the Latin motto Sicut Lucifer lucet in Aurora, sic in Wandalia Carmona ("As the Morning-star shines in the Dawn, so shines Carmona in Andalusia"). During the Late Middle Ages, the town preserved a Muslim-majority population ruled by a Christian minority. The citadel of Carmona, now in ruins, was the principal fortress of Peter the Cruel (from 1350 to 1369), and contained a spacious palace within its defences. Carmona served as a prison camp for Jewish captives taken after the surrender of Málaga in 1487. Towards the end of the 15th century Carmona had an estimated population of about 8,000.

By the dawn of the Early Modern period, Carmona's economy was agriculture-based, with the town featuring many latifundia, often entitled to non-local landowners, and a substantial fraction of non-active population.

The 19th century desamortizaciones led to the creation of a new landowning class that came to be historiographically designated as "agrarian bourgeoisie". The population boomed in the mid 20th century.

== Archaeology ==
In June 2024, University of Cordoba recently announced the discovery of a 2,000-year-old white wine in a glass funerary urn in a tomb in Carmona. The tomb also contained the skeletal remains of two men called Hispana and Senicio, along with the remains of two other men and two women who were unnamed. Researchers noted that despite millennia passing, the tomb remained well-preserved, protecting it from floods and leaks. This preservation allowed the wine to retain its natural state.

== Main sights ==
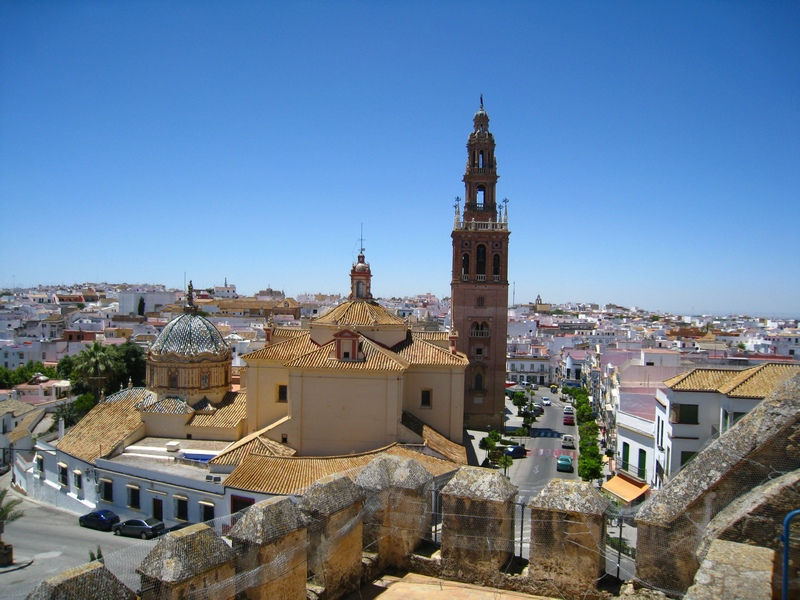
Iglesia de San Pedro

- Palace of King Don Pedro, built in the 13th century by Peter I of Castile. It was damaged by an earthquake in 1504.
- Moorish alcázar
- Palace of Rueda
- Palace of the Marquess of Torres
- Seville Gate Palace
- Baroque palaces of Alonso Bernal Escamilla, Aguilar, Domínguez, and Lasso
- Córdoba Gate, the gate on the road to Córdoba, partly of Roman construction
- Seville Gate, of Carthaginian origins, has the remains of later Roman additions, and was modified in the Middle Ages by the Moors and the Christians.
- Marchena Gate, built during the Almohad domination of Spain
- Roman Bridge
- Remains of the Via Augusta
- Tree-lined avenue of Alfonso XIII

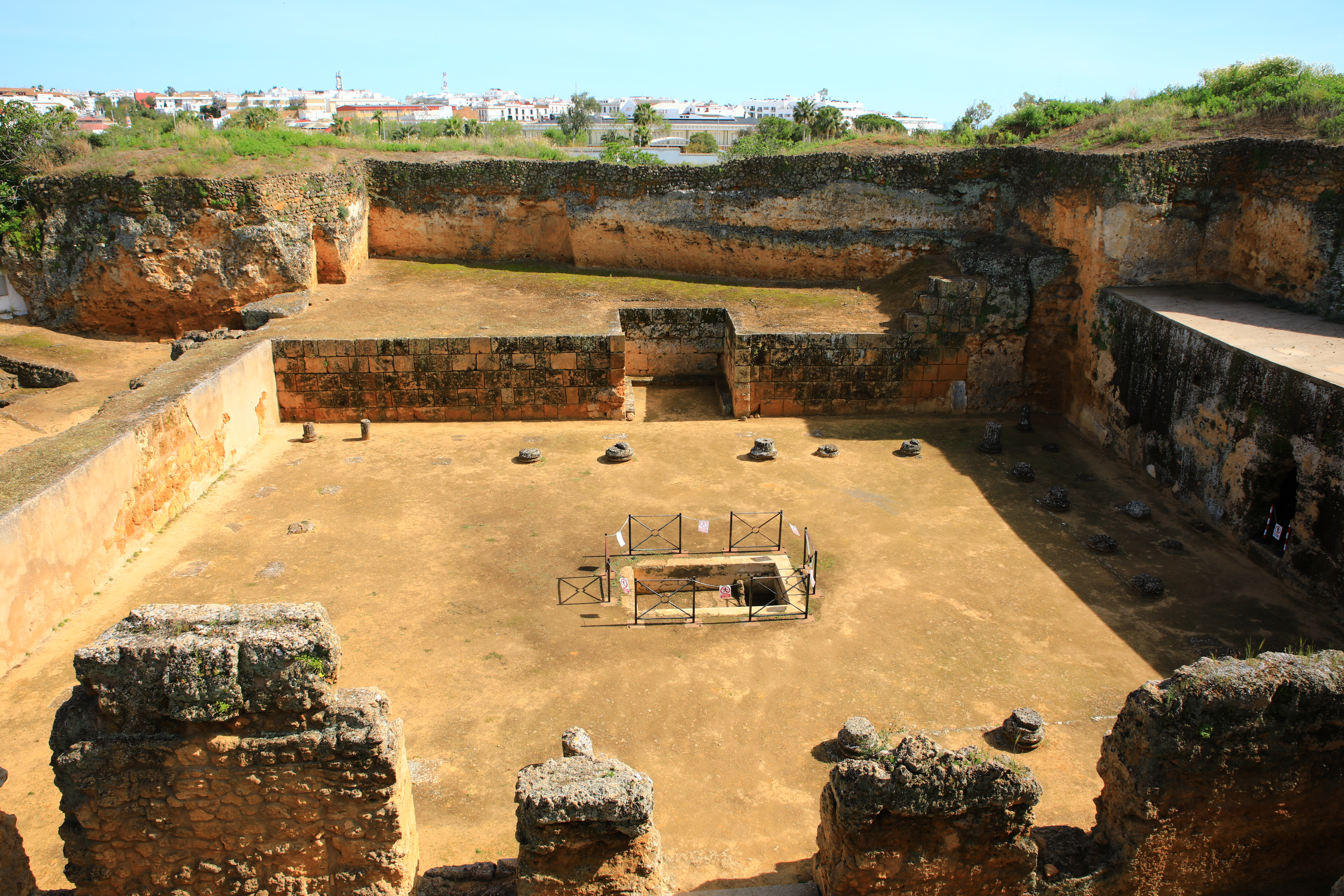
The Tomb of Servilia, in the Roman necropolis.

- Roman Necropolis, discovered in 1881. It is located close to the town, beside the Seville road, and contains more than nine hundred family tombs dating from the second century BC to the fourth century AD. Enclosed in subterranean chambers hewn from the rock, the tombs are often frescoed and contain a series of niches in which many of the funeral urns remain intact. Some of the larger tombs have vestibules with stone benches for funeral banquets and several retain carved family emblems.
- The Tomb of the Elephant and the Tomb of Servilia in the necropolis
- Roman Amphitheatre, discovered in 1885, together with a group of tombs, all belonging to the first four centuries AD, near the original necropolis.
- Ayuntamiento (Town Hall)
- Cave of the Batida
- Fountain of the Lions
- Hospital of the Mercy and the Charity Church of Saint Bartholomew
- Tower of the Peak
- Market
- Cerezo Theatre

Religious buildings

- Church of San Pedro (15th century). Its tower is a medieval replica of the Giralda bell tower of the Cathedral of Seville.
- Church of Santa Maria de la Asunción
- Church of El Salvador (17th century), in Baroque style
- Church of the Convent of Santa Ana
- Church of San Blas
- Church of San Felipe (14th century)
- Church of Santiago
- Convent of the Immaculate Conception
- Convent of the Trinity
- Convent of Las Descalzas Discalced Carmelite Nuns
- Convent of Santa Clara (15th century), with a Mudéjar church renovated in 1664 in Baroque style
- Hermitage of San Mateo (15th century)
- Hermitage of Our Lady of Real or San Antón (15th century).
- Ermita de la Virgen de Gracia (Our Lady of Grace, the patron saint of Carmona)

== Gastronomy ==
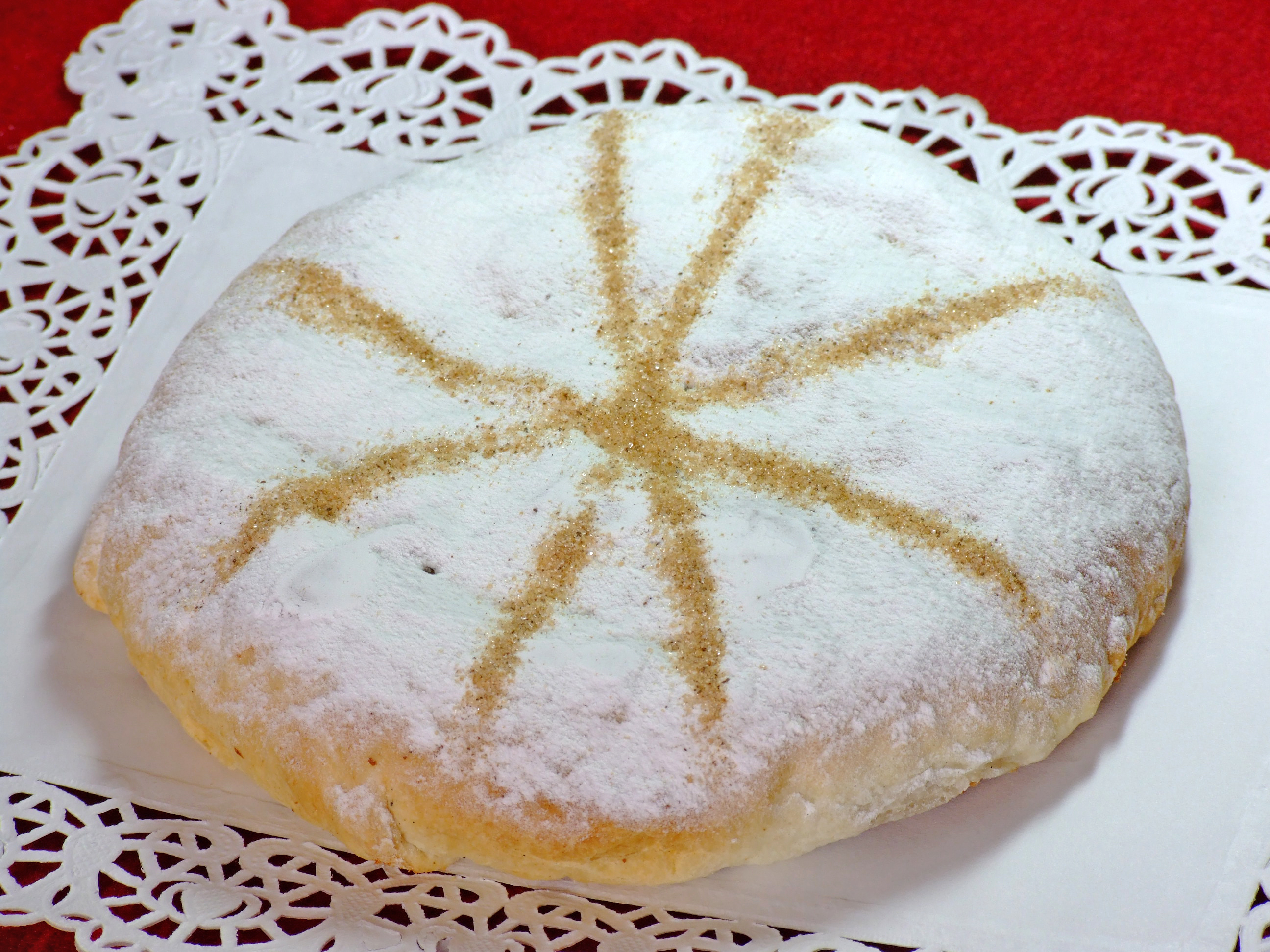
Torta inglesa

Carmona's restaurants and bars demonstrate a variety of Spanish cuisine including tapas and other dishes. The city is known for its traditional Andalusian cooking. A pub crawl of various bars, called the Ruta de las tapas (Tapas Route) is noteworthy; it is marked with blue and white signs, and even appears in the seal of the city.

Typical Carmonan dishes include: sopa de picadillo (a chicken soup), pringá, chickpeas, snails, salmorejo, spinach, tagarnina (thistles), Serrano ham, partridge from the mountains, gazpacho, chickpea soup, tomato soup, potatoes, and cuajados (curdled eggs).

Sweets include: torta inglesa, hojaldres (puff pastry), rice with milk, torrija (fried toasted bread with wine, milk or honey), polvorónes (shortbread), almond cakes, chestnut stew with cinnamon, porridge sprinkled with cinnamon, and cortadillos (sweet cakes). A variety of desserts are made in the convents of the city, mainly by the nuns of Santa Clara.

A common alcoholic beverage is Anise Los Hermanos, which is distilled and packaged in Carmona; it comes in three degrees of dryness: crisp, sweet and semi.

== Films ==
With its rich historical and artistic patrimony lending the city an especially atmospheric appearance, Carmona has been the setting of numerous films, and continues to attract movie crews. The Location Managers Guild of America, an association that coordinates shoot locations for movie and television production companies from the United States, has shown special interest in the city centre. A video clip for the song 'Gold' by Spandau Ballet was also shot here.

== Gallery ==
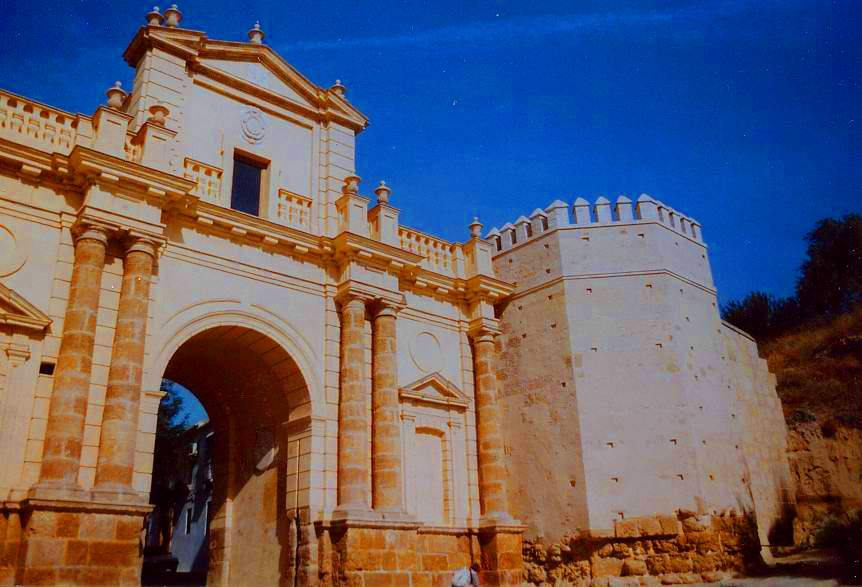
Puerta de Cordoba

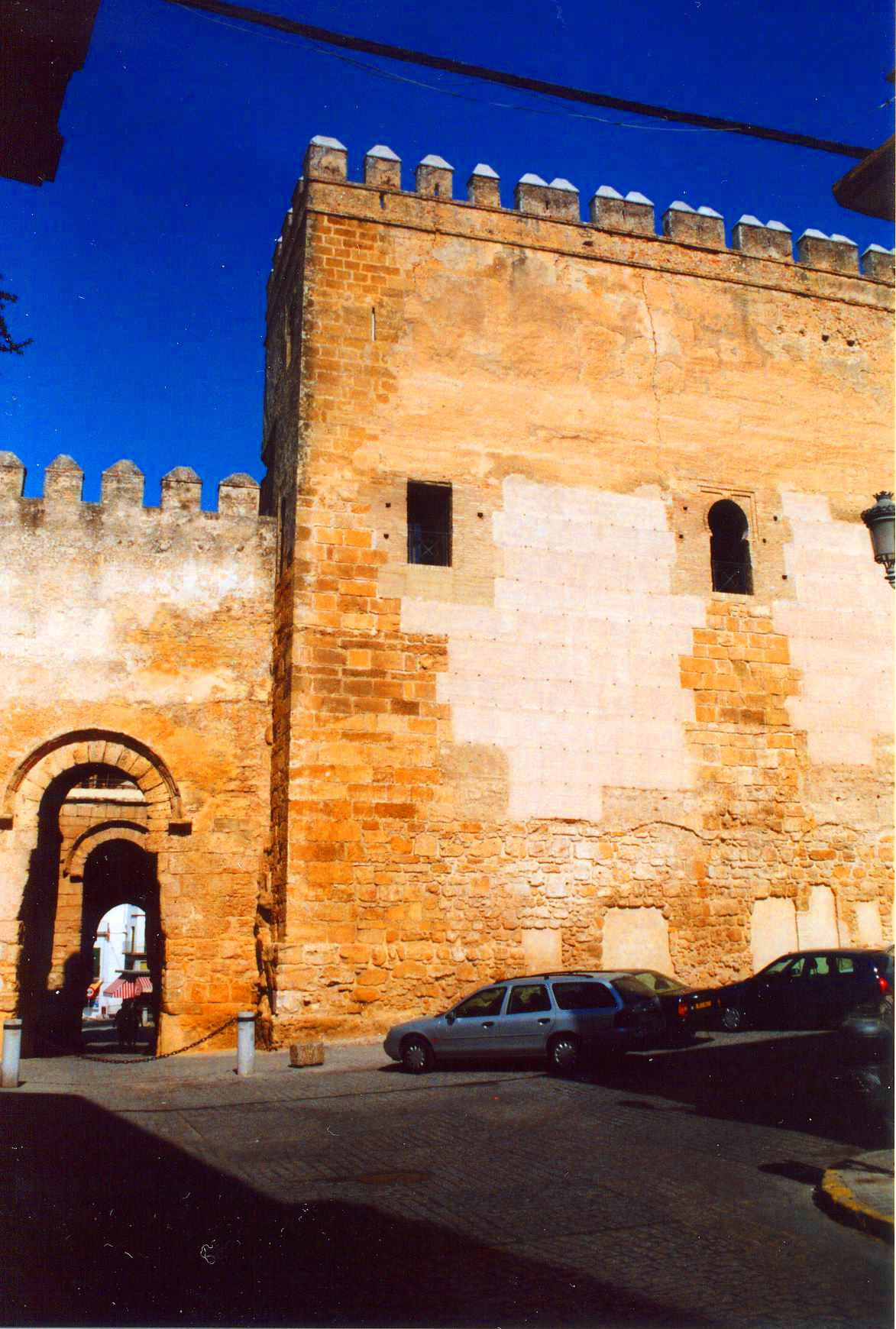
Puerta de Sevilla

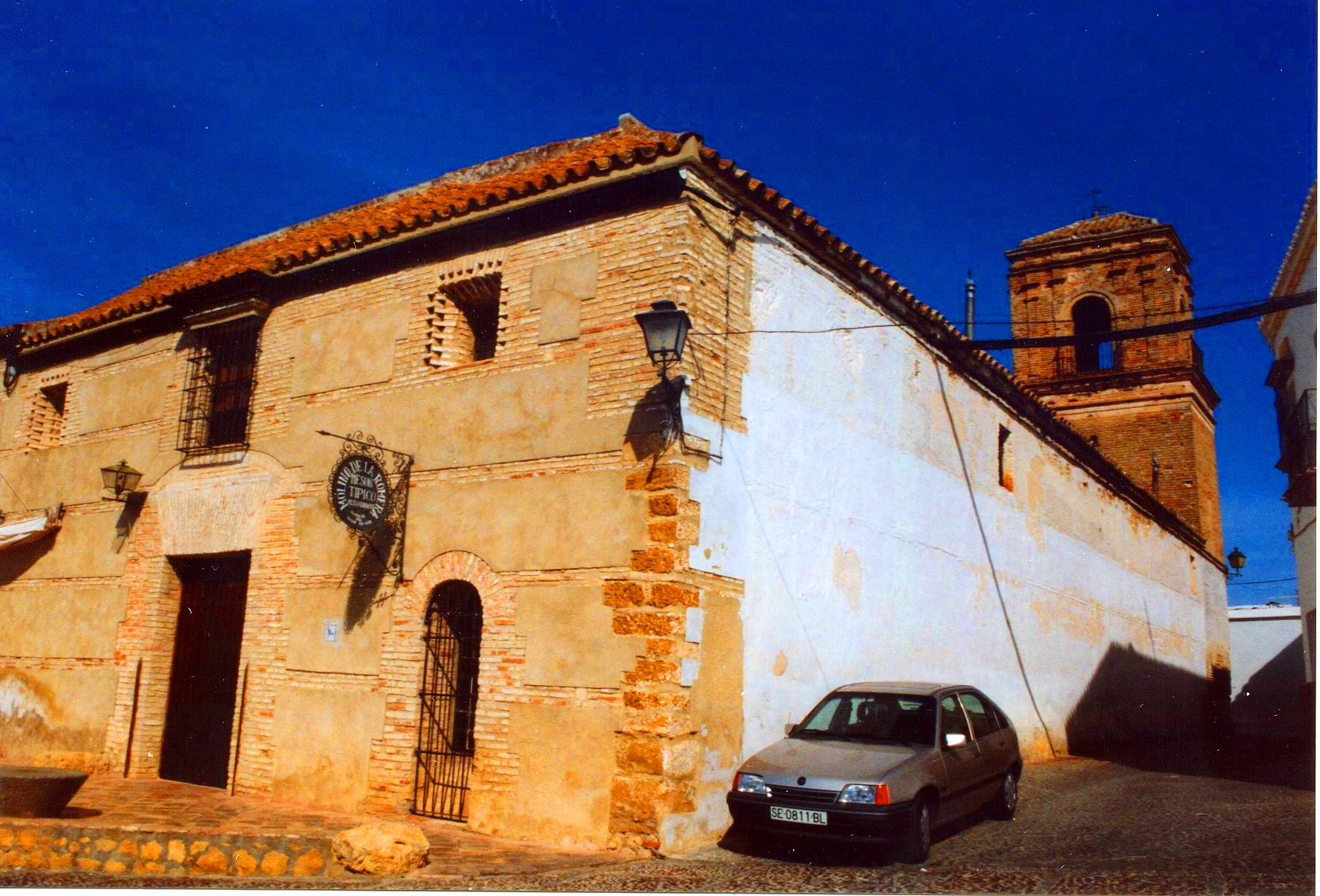
Molino de la Romera

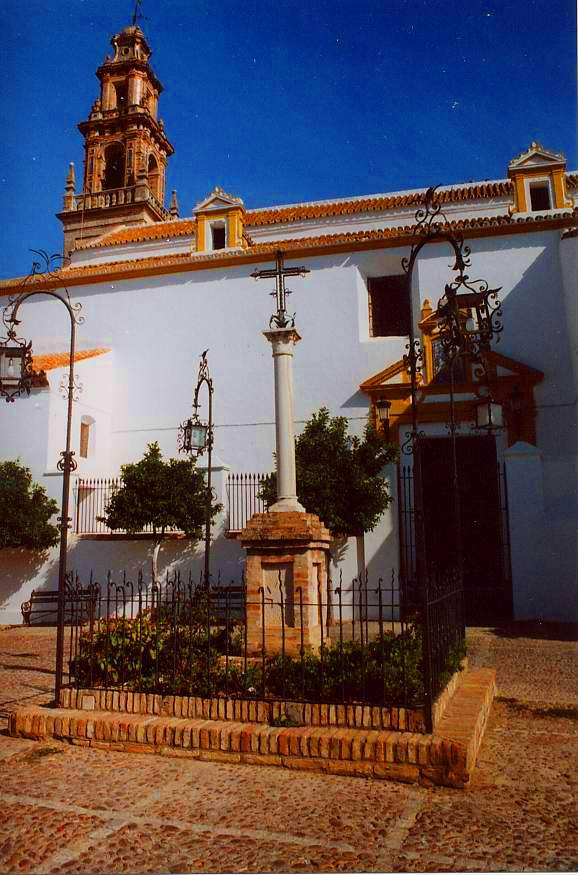
Iglesia de Santiago

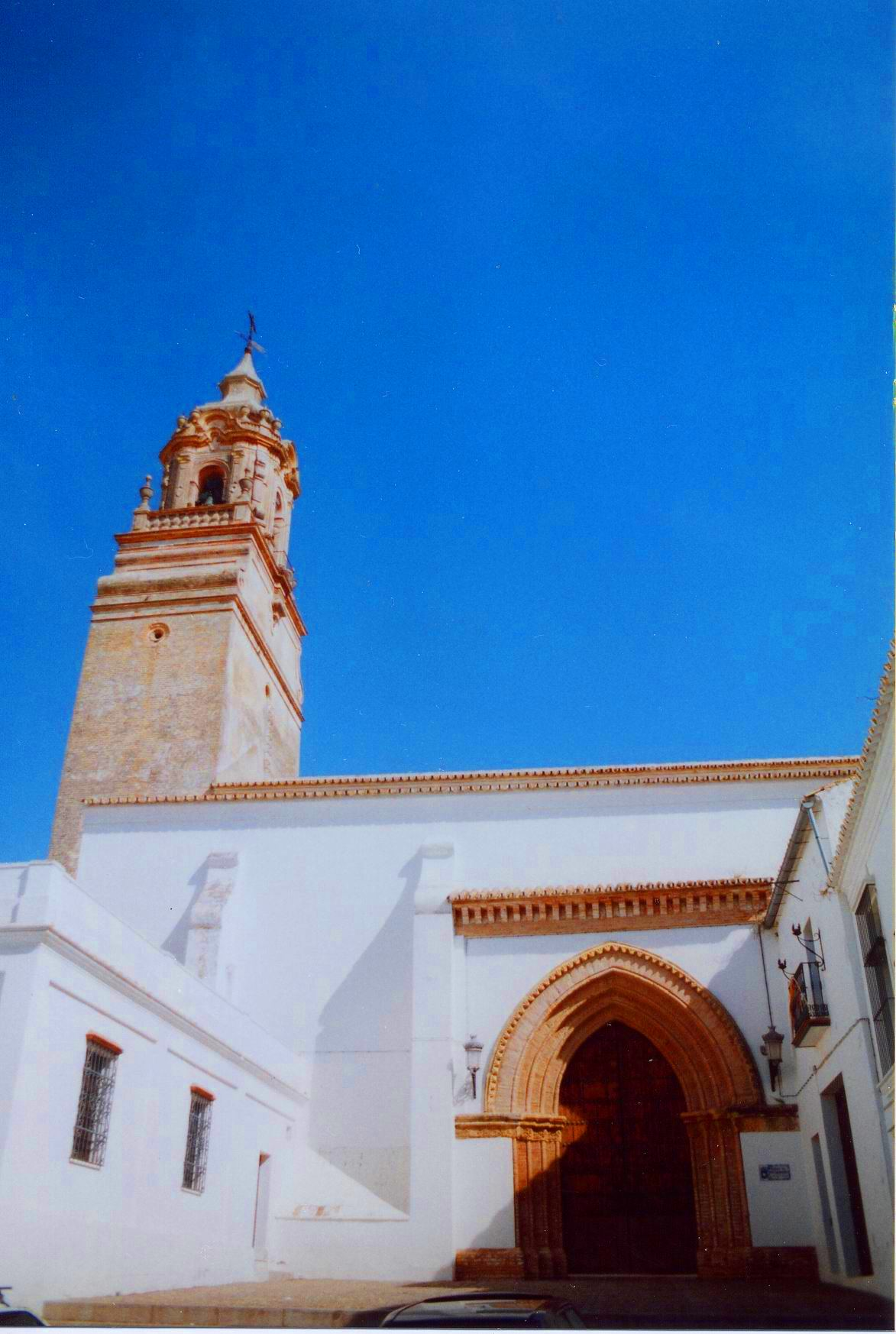
Iglesia de San Bartolome

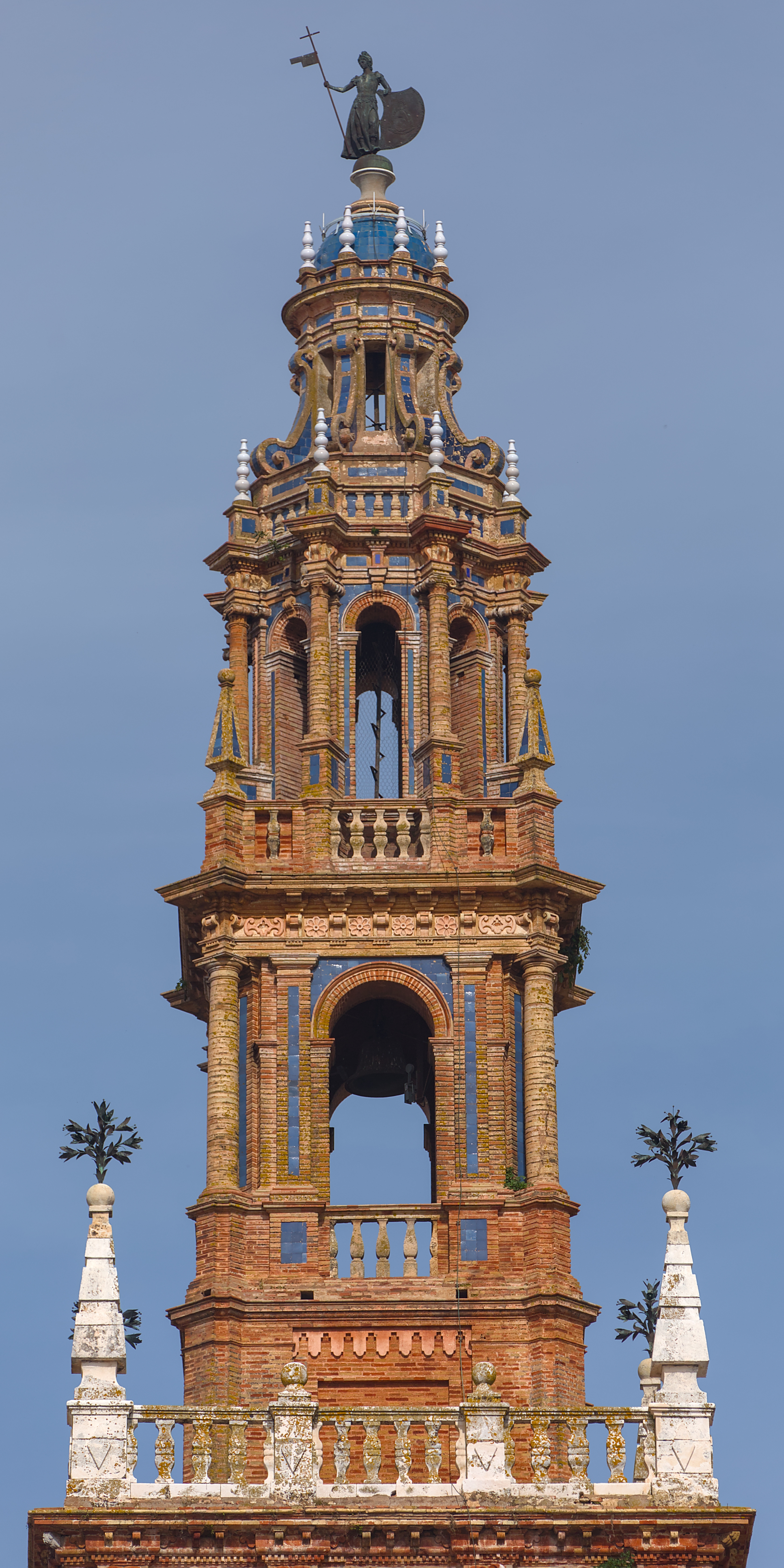
Belltower of Iglesia de San Pedro

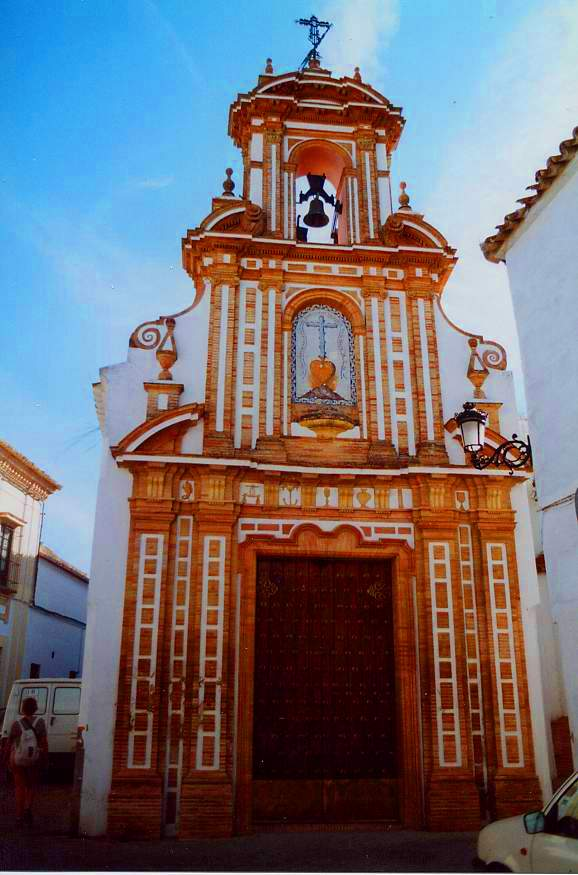
Capilla de la Caridad

== Notable people ==
- Rodrigo González de Marmolejo (1487–1564) a Roman Catholic prelate & the first Bishop of Santiago de Chile
- Antón García Caro (1560 - ca 1624) a Spanish jurist and politician
- Manuel Freire de Andrade (1767–1835) a Spanish cavalry officer
- Tomás Domínguez Romera (1848–1931) a Spanish aristocrat, landholder and politician.
- José Arpa (1858–1952) an artist who worked in Spain, Mexico, and Texas
- Michael Denzil Xavier Portillo (born 1953) British journalist, broadcaster and former Conservative politician; lives in Carmona.
- Félix Gómez (born 1977) a Spanish actor.
- Rafa Marín (born 2002) a Spanish football player.

== See also ==
- The Roman Bética Route
- List of municipalities in Seville
