= Bacillus safensis =

Scientific classification
- Domain: Bacteria
- Kingdom: Bacillati
- Phylum: Bacillota
- Class: Bacilli
- Order: Caryophanales
- Family: Bacillaceae
- Genus: Bacillus
- Species: B. safensis

Binomial name
- Bacillus safensis Satomi et al. 2006

Species of bacterium

Bacillus safensis is a gram-positive, spore-forming, and rod bacterium, originally isolated from a spacecraft in Florida and California. B. safensis could have possibly been transported to the planet Mars on spacecraft Opportunity and Spirit in 2004. There are several known strains of this bacterium, all of which belong to the Bacillota phylum of Bacteria. This bacterium also belongs to the large, pervasive genus Bacillus. B. safensis is an aerobic chemoheterotroph and is highly resistant to salt and UV radiation. B. safensis affects plant growth, since it is a powerful plant hormone producer, and it also acts as a plant growth-promoting rhizobacteria, enhancing plant growth after root colonization. Strain B. safensis JPL-MERTA-8-2 is (so far) the only bacterial strain shown to grow noticeably faster in micro-gravity environments than on the Earth surface.

== Discovery and importance ==
Thirteen strains of the novel bacterium Bacillus safensis were first isolated from spacecraft surfaces and assembly-facility surfaces at the Kennedy Space Center in Florida as well as the Jet Propulsion Laboratory in California. The bacterium gets its name from the JPL Spacecraft Assembly Facility (SAF). Researchers used customary swabbing techniques to detect and collect the bacteria from cleanrooms where the spacecraft were put together in the Jet Propulsion Laboratory. The bacterium was accidentally brought to Mars during space missions due to contamination of clean rooms. Contamination of clean rooms during space travel is an area of concern for planetary protection as it can threaten microbial experimentation and give false positives of other microbial life forms on other planets.

V.V. Kothari and his colleagues from Saurashtra University in Gujarat, India, first isolated another strain, B. safensis VK. Strain VK was collected from Cuminum cyminum, a cumin plant in the desert area of Gujarat, India. Specifically, the bacteria were collected from the rhizosphere of the cumin plant.

Ram S. Singh and colleagues discovered one of the strains, AS-08, in soil samples of root tubers of asparagus plants in a botanical garden at Punjabi University in India. B. safensis AS-08 was found to have inulase activity, which is used for the production of fructooligosaccharides and high-fructose corn syrup. Fructooligosaccharides are used as artificial sweeteners and can be found in many commercial food products. Corn syrup is also found in many processed foods.

Davender Kumar and colleagues from Kurukshetra University in India isolated strain DVL-43 from soil samples. This strain was found to possess lipase, which is an important enzyme for fat digestion. Lipases are a class of chemicals that are abundant in nature amongst plants, animals and microorganisms that are widely used in industry for production of food, paper products, detergents and biodiesel fuel.

P. Ravikumar of the Government Arts College at Bharathiar University in India isolated strain PR-2 from explosive-laden soil samples. This strain was identified by its 16S rDNA sequence by Sanger dideoxy sequencing method and deposited in the GenBank in Maryland, U.S. It carries the accession number KP261381 with 885 base pairs of linear DNA and the base count 175 a 295 c 199 g 216 t.

== Physical characteristics and metabolism ==
Bacillus safensis is a gram-positive, spore-forming rod bacterium. B. safensis is also an aerobic chemoheterotroph. Cell size ranges from 0.5 to 0.7 μm in diameter and 1.0–1.2 μm in length. This species is motile, and use polar flagella for locomotion. Many B. safensis strains are considered mesophilic, as they grow optimally in temperatures of 10–50 °C (50–122 °F), though certain strains exhibit extremophilic tendencies in tolerating salinity, UV exposure, low moisture, and temperatures commonly considered extreme. B. safensis FO-036b has an optimal temperature range of 30–37 °C (86–99 °F), and cannot grow at 4 or 55 °C (39 or 131 °F). B. safensis FO-036b prefers 0–10% salt, and a pH of 5.6. This strain was also found to produce spores that are resistant to hydrogen peroxide and UV radiation.

Strain VK of B. safensis is a salt-tolerant microorganism, and can grow beyond the 0–10% salt range of the general microbial species. This strain can grow in 14% NaCl, with a pH ranging from 4 to 8. Strain VK also contains genes that encode for 1-aminocyclopropane-1-carboxylate deaminase enzyme. This enzyme is able to generate 2-oxobutanoate and ammonia (NH_{3}) by cleaving the precursor of plant hormone, ethylene 1-aminocyclopropane-1-carboxylate. This enables the plant to tolerate salt, heavy metals, and polyaromatic hydrocarbons. Because of these features, B. safensis VK is a powerful plant hormone producer.

== Genomics ==
The genome of Bacillus safensis strain FO-036b shows a GC-content of 41.0-41.4 mol%.

The B. safensis VK genomic DNA was obtained from a 24-hr-old nutrient broth culture. Isolation of this strain was performed using a GenElute commercial DNA isolation kit, and whole-genome shotgun sequencing was carried out. Thirty-nine contigs, overlapping DNA fragments, greater in size than 200 base pairs were observed in strain VK. This strain displays a GC-content of 46.1% in a circular chromosome of 3.68 Mbp. 3,928 protein-coding sequences were identified, and 1,822 protein-coding sequences were appointed to one of the 457 RAST subsystems. RAST, Rapid Annotation using Subsystem Technology, is a server that generates bacterial and archaeal genome annotations. The genome also displays 73 tRNA genes. The B. safensis VK genome sequence can be found in GenBank under the accession number AUPF00000000. Another strain, DVL-43, can also be found in GenBank under the accession number KC156603, and strain PR-2 can be found under accession number KP261381. A detailed Whole Genome Phylogenetic Analysis of the genomes of B. safensis, B. pumilus and other Bacillota species, showed them to be separated into three distinct clusters. One of the large sub-clusters includes not only strains classified/identified (in literature) as belonging to B. safensis but also some B. pumilus strains, thus suggesting how phylogenetic profiling may enable re-examining the strain designations.

== Strains ==
Listed below are currently identified Bacillus safensis strains, including where they were discovered, and the year discovered (if available).

- Bacillus safensis subsp. safensis FO-36B – clean room – California (1999)
- Bacillus safensis NH21E_2 – sediment – South China Sea
- Bacillus safensis B204-B1-5 – sediment – South China Sea
- Bacillus safensis EMJ-O3-B1-22 – sediment – South China Sea
- Bacillus safensis CJWT7 – sediment – South China Sea
- Bacillus safensis SLN29 – sediment – South China Sea
- Bacillus safensis BMO4-13 – surface water – Pacific Ocean
- Bacillus safensis D21 – sediment – Arctic Ocean
- Bacillus safensis HYg-9 – intestinal tract contents of fish – Xiamen Island
- Bacillus safensis NP-4 – surface water – Arctic Ocean
- Bacillus safensis 15-BO4 10-15-3 – Sediment – Bering Sea
- Bacillus safensis DW3-7 – aquaculture water – shrimp farm
- Bacillus safensis FO-33 – clean room – California (1999)
- Bacillus safensis SAFN-001 – entrance floor of Jet Propulsion Lab (2001)
- Bacillus safensis SAFN-027 – ante room of Jet Propulsion Lab (2001)
- Bacillus safensis SAFN-036 – clean room of Jet Propulsion Lab (2001)
- Bacillus safensis SAFN-037 – clean room floor of JPL (2001)
- Bacillus safensis KL-052 – clean room cabinet top of JPL (2001)
- Bacillus safensis 51-3C – Mars Odyssey spacecraft surface (2002)
- Bacillus safensis 81-4C – Mars Odyssey assembly facility floor (2002)
- Bacillus safensis A2-2C – Mars Odyssey assembly facility floor (2002)
- Bacillus safensis 84-1C – Mars Odyssey assembly facility floor (2002)
- Bacillus safensis 84-3C – Mars Odyssey assembly facility floor (2002)
- Bacillus safensis 84-4C – Mars Odyssey assembly facility floor (2002)
- Bacillus safensis JPL-MERTA-8-2 - Mars Exploration Rover clean room of JPL (2004)
- Bacillus safensis DVL-43 – India
- Bacillus safensis VK – Gujarat, India
- Bacillus safensis AS08 – botanical garden - Punjabi University, India
- Bacillus safensis PR-2 – explosive laden soil - Tamil Nadu, India (2015)
- Bacillus safensis subsp. safensis HCM-06 – rhizospheric soil – India(2022)
- Bacillus safensis BB2 – bee bread (fermented bee pollen) - Malaysia (2018)
- Bacillus safensis MAE 17 - soil - Egypt (2019)
- Bacillus safensis subsp. osmophilus BC09 - condensed milk - Spain (2019)

== Differentiation between related species ==
Several isolates of the genus Bacillus are nearly identical to Bacillus pumilus. The group of isolates related to B. pumilus contains five related species: B. pumilus, B. safensis, B. stratosphericus, B. altitudinis, and B. aerophilus. These species are difficult to distinguish due to their 99.5% similarity in their 16S rRNA gene sequence. Recently, scientists have discovered an alternate way to differentiate between these closely related species, especially B. pumilus and B. safensis.

DNA gyrase is an important enzyme that introduces a negative supercoil to the DNA and is responsible for the biological processes in DNA replication and transcription. DNA gyrase is made of two subunits, A and B. These subunits are denoted as gyrA and gyrB. The gyrB gene, subunit B protein, is a type II topoisomerase that is essential for DNA replication. This gene is conserved among bacterial species. The rate of evolution at the molecular level deduced from gyrB-related gene sequences can be determined at a more accelerated rate compared to the 16S rRNA gene sequences. These subunits have provided a way to phylogenetically distinguish between the diversity of species related to B. pumilus, which includes B. safensis. Strain B. safensis DSM19292 shares 90.2% gyrA sequence similarity with B. pumilus strain DSM 27.

In 1952, a strain of B. pumilus was discovered in the DSMZ culture and labeled as strain DSM 354. The strain was identified before B. safensis was discovered. In 2012, a gyrA sequence similarity was tested between the B. pumilus strain DSM 354 and B. pumilus strain DSM 27, as well as against B. safensis strain DSM 19292 (type strain FO-36b). Strain DSM 354 showed a 90.4% and 98% sequence similarity with B. pumilus strain DSM 27 and B. safensis strain DSM 19292, respectively. These results indicated that DSM 354 may in fact be a B. safensis strain, instead of a B. pumilus strain. These results supported that gyrA sequences could be used to differentiate between closely related bacteria.

== See also ==
- Bacillus odysseyi
- Interplanetary contamination
- Tersicoccus phoenicis
