= Yaniella soli =

Scientific classification
- Domain: Bacteria
- Kingdom: Bacillati
- Phylum: Actinomycetota
- Class: Actinomycetes
- Order: Micrococcales
- Family: Micrococcaceae
- Genus: Yaniella
- Species: Y. soli

Binomial name
- Yaniella soli Chen et al. 2012

Type strain
- DSM 22211; JSM 070026; KCTC 13527

Species of bacterium

Yaniella soli is a Gram-negative, slightly halophilic non-spore-forming, facultatively alkaliphilic and non-motile bacterium from the genus Yaniella which has been isolated from forest soil from Hunan Province, China.
