= Paeniglutamicibacter antarcticus =

Scientific classification
- Domain: Bacteria
- Kingdom: Bacillati
- Phylum: Actinomycetota
- Class: Actinomycetes
- Order: Micrococcales
- Family: Micrococcaceae
- Genus: Paeniglutamicibacter
- Species: P. antarcticus

Binomial name
- Paeniglutamicibacter antarcticus (Pindi et al. 2010) Busse 2016

Type strain
- DSM 29880; LMG 24542; NCCB 100228; SPC 26

Synonyms
- Arthrobacter antarcticus Pindi et al. 2010

Species of bacterium

Paeniglutamicibacter antarcticus is a species of bacteria. It is Gram-positive, motile, aerobic and has a rod–coccus cycle.
