= Penicillium subrubescens =

Scientific classification
- Domain: Eukaryota
- Kingdom: Fungi
- Division: Ascomycota
- Class: Eurotiomycetes
- Order: Eurotiales
- Family: Aspergillaceae
- Genus: Penicillium
- Species: P. subrubescens

Binomial name
- Penicillium subrubescens Houbraken, Mansouri & Frisvad 2013

Type strain
- CBS 132785, CBS H-21029, DTO 188-D6, FBCC 1632, BT 31985

Species of fungus

Penicillium subrubescens is a species of the genus of Penicillium which produces high amounts of inulinase.
