= Citricoccus muralis =

Scientific classification
- Domain: Bacteria
- Kingdom: Bacillati
- Phylum: Actinomycetota
- Class: Actinomycetes
- Order: Micrococcales
- Family: Micrococcaceae
- Genus: Citricoccus
- Species: C. muralis

Binomial name
- Citricoccus muralis Altenburger et al. 2002

Type strain
- 4-0; CCM 4981; CCUG 51768; CIP 107799; DSM 11442; DSM 14442; JCM 12134

Species of bacterium

Citricoccus muralis is a Gram-positive and aerobic bacterium from the genus Citricoccus which has been isolated from a wall painting from Sankt Georgen ob Judenburg, Austria.
