= Sinomonas soli =

Scientific classification
- Domain: Bacteria
- Kingdom: Bacillati
- Phylum: Actinomycetota
- Class: Actinomycetes
- Order: Micrococcales
- Family: Micrococcaceae
- Genus: Sinomonas
- Species: S. soli

Binomial name
- Sinomonas soli Zhou et al. 2012

Type strain
- CCTCC AB 207193; KCTC 19389; CW 59

Species of bacterium

Sinomonas soli is a strictly aerobic and non-motile bacterium from the genus Sinomonas which has been isolated from forest soil from the Anhui Province in China.
