= Paeniglutamicibacter cryotolerans =

Scientific classification
- Domain: Bacteria
- Kingdom: Bacillati
- Phylum: Actinomycetota
- Class: Actinomycetes
- Order: Micrococcales
- Family: Micrococcaceae
- Genus: Paeniglutamicibacter
- Species: P. cryotolerans

Binomial name
- Paeniglutamicibacter cryotolerans (Ganzert et al. 2011) Busse 2016

Type strain
- DSM 22826; JCM 17806; LI3; NCCB 100315

Synonyms
- Arthrobacter cryotolerans Ganzert et al. 2011

Species of bacterium

Paeniglutamicibacter cryotolerans is a species of bacteria. It is psychrotolerant, halotolerant, Gram-positive, motile, and facultatively anaerobic. It possesses a rod–coccus cycle.
