= Citricoccus nitrophenolicus =

Scientific classification
- Domain: Bacteria
- Kingdom: Bacillati
- Phylum: Actinomycetota
- Class: Actinomycetes
- Order: Micrococcales
- Family: Micrococcaceae
- Genus: Citricoccus
- Species: C. nitrophenolicus

Binomial name
- Citricoccus nitrophenolicus Nielsen et al. 2012

Type strain
- CCUG 59571; DSM 23311; PNP1

Species of bacterium

Citricoccus nitrophenolicus is a Gram-positive, para-nitrophenol-degrading and non-motile bacterium from the genus Citricoccus which has been isolated from sludge from a wastewater treatment plant from Northern Jutland, Denmark.
