= Enteractinococcus viverrae =

Scientific classification
- Domain: Bacteria
- Kingdom: Bacillati
- Phylum: Actinomycetota
- Class: Actinomycetes
- Order: Micrococcales
- Family: Micrococcaceae
- Genus: Enteractinococcus
- Species: E. viverrae

Binomial name
- Enteractinococcus viverrae Chen et al. 2015

Species of bacterium

Enteractinococcus viverrae is a bacterium from the genus of Enteractinococcus which has been isolated from animal faeces from a Large Indian civet from the Yunnan Wild Animal Park in China.
