= Citricoccus zhacaiensis =

Scientific classification
- Domain: Bacteria
- Kingdom: Bacillati
- Phylum: Actinomycetota
- Class: Actinomycetes
- Order: Micrococcales
- Family: Micrococcaceae
- Genus: Citricoccus
- Species: C. zhacaiensis

Binomial name
- Citricoccus zhacaiensis Meng et al. 2010

Type strain
- CGMCC 1.7064; FS24; JCM 15136

Species of bacterium

Citricoccus zhacaiensis is a Gram-positive, neutrophilic, non-spore-forming and non-motile bacterium from the genus Citricoccus.
