= Sinomonas mesophila =

Scientific classification
- Domain: Bacteria
- Kingdom: Bacillati
- Phylum: Actinomycetota
- Class: Actinomycetes
- Order: Micrococcales
- Family: Micrococcaceae
- Genus: Sinomonas
- Species: S. mesophila

Binomial name
- Sinomonas mesophila Prabhu et al. 2015

Type strain
- JCM 30094; NCIM 5552; MPKL 26

Species of bacterium

Sinomonas mesophila is a Gram-positive bacterium from the genus Sinomonas which has been isolated from soil from Bidar Fort, India.
