= Rothia aeria =

Scientific classification
- Domain: Bacteria
- Kingdom: Bacillati
- Phylum: Actinomycetota
- Class: Actinomycetes
- Order: Micrococcales
- Family: Micrococcaceae
- Genus: Rothia
- Species: R. aeria

Binomial name
- Rothia aeria Li et al. 2004

Type strain
- A1-17B; GTC 867; JCM 11412; DSM 14556

Species of bacterium

Rothia aeria is a species of Gram-positive bacteria in the genus Rothia that was first isolated from the Russian space laboratory Mir.
