= Glutamicibacter arilaitensis =

Scientific classification
- Domain: Bacteria
- Kingdom: Bacillati
- Phylum: Actinomycetota
- Class: Actinomycetes
- Order: Micrococcales
- Family: Micrococcaceae
- Genus: Glutamicibacter
- Species: G. arilaitensis

Binomial name
- Glutamicibacter arilaitensis (Irlinger et al. 2005) Busse 2016

Type strain
- CIP 108037; DSM 16368; JCM 13566; Re117

Synonyms
- Arthrobacter arilaitensis Irlinger et al. 2005)

Species of bacterium

Glutamicibacter arilaitensis is a bacterium from the genus of Glutamicibacter which has been isolated from Reblochon cheese from France.
