= Glutamicibacter soli =

Scientific classification
- Domain: Bacteria
- Kingdom: Bacillati
- Phylum: Actinomycetota
- Class: Actinomycetes
- Order: Micrococcales
- Family: Micrococcaceae
- Genus: Glutamicibacter
- Species: G. soli

Binomial name
- Glutamicibacter soli (Roh et al. 2008) Busse 2016

Type strain
- SYB2^{T} KCTC 19291^{T} DSM 19449^{T}

Synonyms
- Arthrobacter soli Roh et al. 2008

Species of bacterium

Glutamicibacter soli is a species of gram-positive bacteria.
