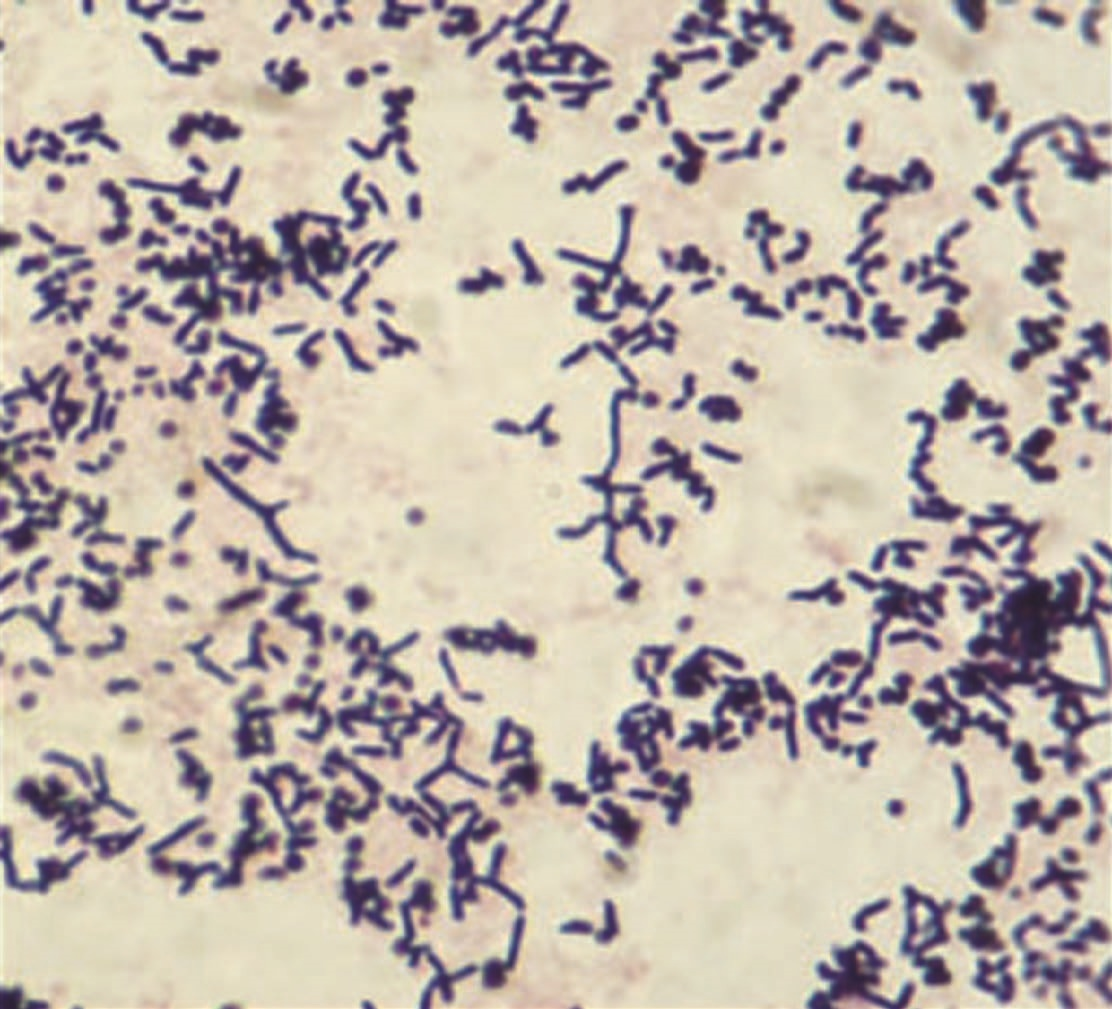
- Gram stain of Rothia dentocariosa.

Scientific classification
- Domain: Bacteria
- Kingdom: Bacillati
- Phylum: Actinomycetota
- Class: Actinomycetes
- Order: Micrococcales
- Family: Micrococcaceae
- Genus: Rothia
- Species: R. dentocariosa

Binomial name
- Rothia dentocariosa (Onishi 1949) Georg and Brown 1967

Type strain
- ATCC 17931; CCUG 35437; CIP 81.83; DSM 43762; DSM 46363; IFO 12531; JCM 3067; NBRC 12531; NCTC 10917; NRRL B-8017

Synonyms
- "Actinomyces dentocariosus" Onishi 1949; "Nocardia dentocariosus" (Onishi 1949) Roth 1957; Rothia dentocariosus (Onishi 1949) Georg and Brown 1967 (Approved Lists 1980)

= Rothia dentocariosa =

Species of bacterium

Rothia dentocariosa is a species of Gram-positive, round- to rod-shaped bacteria that is part of the normal community of microbes residing in the mouth and respiratory tract.

R. dentocariosa secretes a peptidoglycan hydrolase that inhibits the growth of Moraxella catarrhalis (an ear infection pathogen) in vitro, indicating that it may have a protective effect against pathogens in the human nasopharnx.

First isolated from dental caries, R. dentocariosa is largely benign, but does very rarely cause disease. The most common R. dentocariosa infection is endocarditis, typically in people with underlying heart valve disorders. Literature case reports show other tissues that are rarely infected include the peritoneum, tonsils, lung, cornea, inner layers of the eye (Endophthalmitis) and brain and intercranial tissues. It is found more abundantly in the dental plaque of individuals with healthy oral cavities and can often be reduced in abundance in periodontal disease. One case reports on a fatal R. dentocariosa infection of a fetus in utero. Another reports the bacterium was responsible for septic arthritis in the knee of a person treated with etanercept for rheumatoid arthritis. Like other R. dentocariosa infections reported in the literature, once the cause of infection was identified, this responded fully to treatment with antibiotics. R. dentocariosa infections may be treated with penicillins, erythromycin, cefazolin, rifampin, aminoglycoside, tetracycline, chloramphenicol, and trimethoprim-sulfamethoxazole.

Variable or pleomorphic in shape and similar to Actinomyces and Nocardia, Rothia was only defined as a genus in 1967. Rothia dentocariosa, like several other species of oral bacteria, is able to reduce nitrate to nitrite, and one study found it in 3% of isolates of nitrate-reducing bacteria from the mouth.
