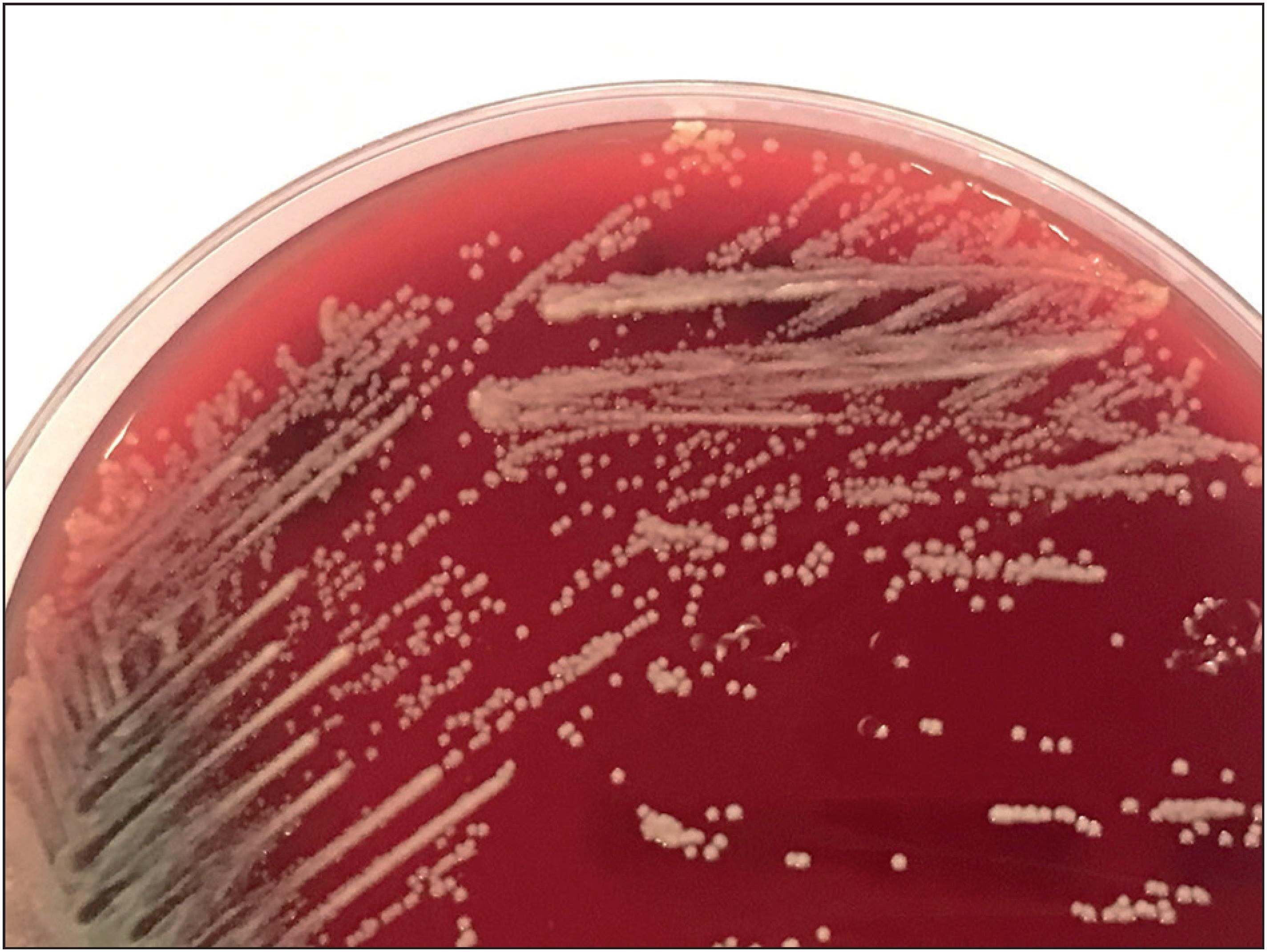
- Growth of Pseudoglutamicibacter cumminsii incubated for 24 hours on 5% sheep blood agar at 37 °C in 5% CO_{2}. Small colonies, less than 2 mm in diameter, round and smooth.

Scientific classification
- Domain: Bacteria
- Kingdom: Bacillati
- Phylum: Actinomycetota
- Class: Actinomycetes
- Order: Micrococcales
- Family: Micrococcaceae
- Genus: Pseudoglutamicibacter
- Species: P. cumminsii

Binomial name
- Pseudoglutamicibacter cumminsii Busse HJ, 2016

Synonyms
- Arthrobacter cumminsii Funke et al. 1997

= Pseudoglutamicibacter cumminsii =

Species of bacterium

Pseudoglutamicibacter cumminsii, (formerly Arthrobacter cumminsii), is a Gram-positive, rod-shaped, non-motile bacterium. Additionally, it is aerobic and mesophilic.

P. cumminsii is globally distributed and can be found in many ecological niches, including soil, water, and as a member of the human microbiome. It has only been regularly isolated and identified in human clinical specimens within the past 30 years. It is an opportunistic pathogen, rarely causing disease in healthy individuals.

In 1996, P. cumminsii was identified by Guido Funke, et.al as a new species during an attempt to identify some clinically significant bacteria which were isolated that were not Brevibacterium spp. The species name, cumminsii, was chosen to honor Cecil S. Cummins, an American microbiologist who helped pioneer chemotaxonomy.

The decision to remove P. cumminsii from the Arthrobacter genus and into a novel genus, Pseudoglutamicibacter, was based on both extensive 16S rRNA gene sequence analysis and chemotaxonomic traits.

== Microbiology ==
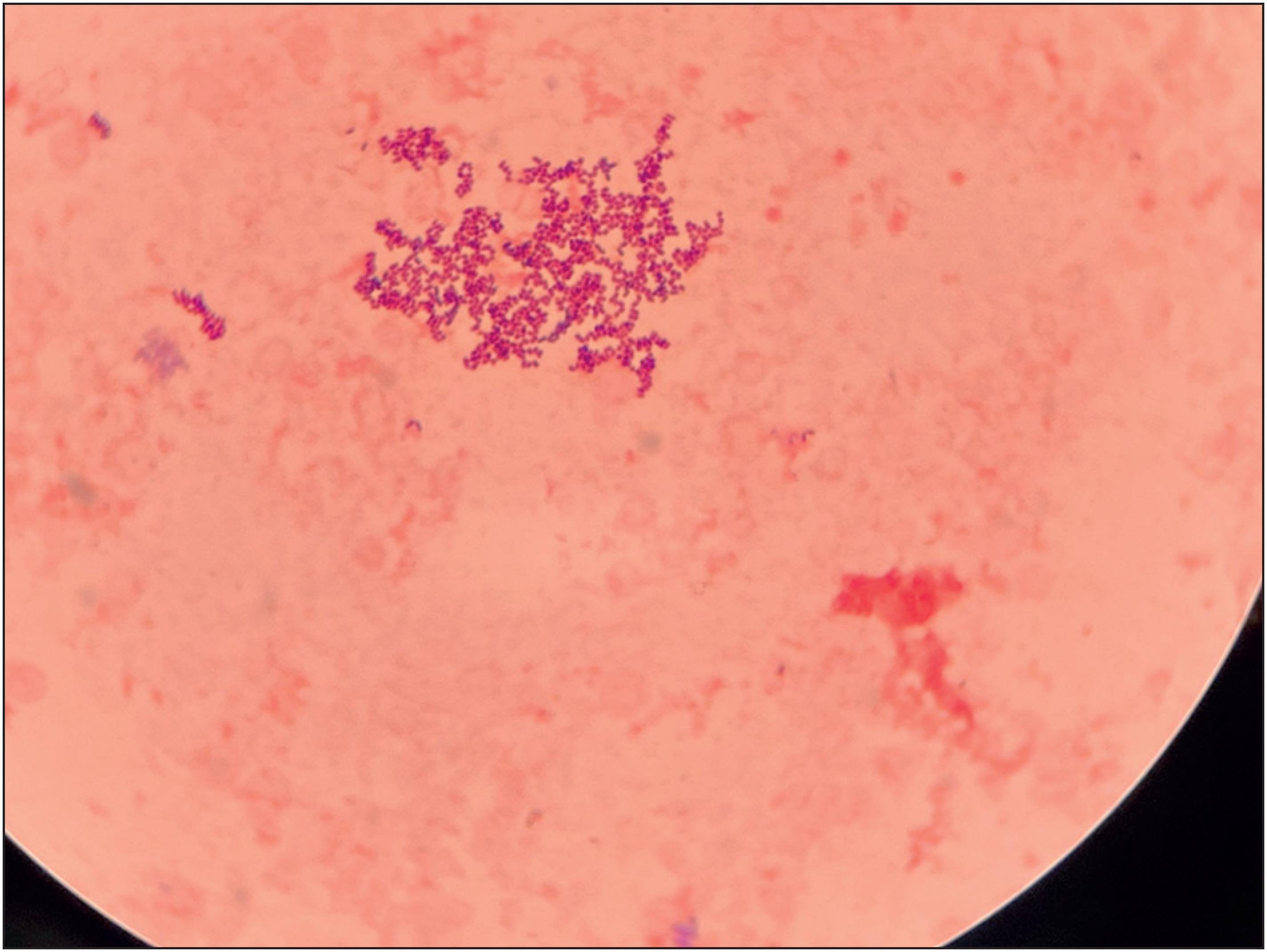
Gram stain of Pseudoglutamicibacter cumminsii culture at 100x.

P. cumminsii is often classified with the Gram positive coryneform rods, although the term "coryneform" is somewhat misleading since only true Corynebacterium spp. exhibit the club-shaped morphology ("coryne", meaning "club" in ancient Greek). However, the term "coryneform" is often used by clinical microbiologists to describe bacteria that are aerobically growing, non-spore producing, irregular, non-partially acid-fast, and gram-positive.

Columbia sheep blood agar plates are the media of choice for cultivating and isolating P. cumminsii, although a fairly wide variety of media will support growth, including CPSO chromogenic medium. Colonies grow with an incubation temperature of 37 degrees Celsius.

P. cumminsii are described as having large, nonfermenting, non-cheese-like-smelling (referring to the biochemically closely related Brevibacterium spp, which smell like cheese), whitish-grayish colonies on Columbia sheep blood agar (SBA) plates. Colonies of P. cumminsii are smaller and more grayish than those of Arthrobacter spp.

Some biochemical reactions that are consistent across P. cumminsii strains include being catalase positive, nonmotile, nitrate reduction negative, CAMP reaction negative, esculin hydrolysis negative, and having oxidative metabolism, produced acid from ribose (but no acid produced in maltose, sucrose, mannitol, xylose, lactose, or glycogen), and no lipophilism.

== Medical relevance ==
Although rare, there have been reported cases of P. cumminsii infection, including in the blood of a patient with epithelial mesothelioma, in the tibia as part of a polymicrobial osteomyelitis, and as a urinary tract infection in an immunosuppressed patient.

P. cumminsii was the most frequently isolated species (n = 14/50) in a study to elucidate the distribution of Arthrobacter spp. and Arthrobacter-like bacteria in clinical specimens.

== Pathogenicity ==
In a P. cumminsii strain isolated from the blood of an infected patient, XJ001 (PC1), a total of 71 potential virulence factors were identified, of which nutritional/metabolic factors had the most genes (23). The other potential virulence genes identified included immune modulation (13), regulation (12), adherence (7), stress survival (6), effector delivery system (6), exoenzyme (2), biofilm (1), and motility (1). Some of the metabolism genes included several key genes for pathogenicity such as yodJ, idh, katA, pyk, sodA, and glsA.

Carboxypeptidases (encoded by yodJ) are enzymes that catalyze the removal of amino acids from the C-terminus of proteins or peptides.

Isocitrate dehydrogenase (encoded by idh) is an enzyme that catalyzes a critical step in the citric acid cycle, converting isocitrate to alpha-ketoglutarate, while producing carbon dioxide and NADH.

Catalase (encoded by katA) is an important enzyme that plays a crucial role in cellular antioxidant defense by breaking down hydrogen peroxide (H2O2) into water and oxygen.

Pyruvate kinase (encoded by pyk) is an enzyme involved in the final step of glycolysis, which is the breakdown of glucose to produce energy in the form of ATP.

Superoxide dismutase (encoded by sodA) is an enzyme that plays a crucial role in cellular antioxidant defense by catalyzing the dismutation of superoxide radicals into hydrogen peroxide and molecular oxygen.

Glutaminase (encoded by glsA) is an enzyme that plays a critical role in cellular metabolism by catalyzing the conversion of glutamine to glutamate.

== Treatment ==
P. cumminsii infection can be treated with antibiotics.

β-lactams, with the exception of ceftibuten, tetracyclines, and macrolides all show good activity against P. cumminsii. Aminoglycosides and quinolones show poor activity against P. cumminsii, but it is not yet clear whether this resistance is intrinsic or acquired, but resistance in all tested strains makes an intrinsic mechanism more likely.

In the strain XJ001 (PC1), whole gene sequencing analysis found resistance to vancomycin, bacitracin, teicoplanin and trimethoprim, which was consistent with the results of a MIC test. Mezlocillin and sulbactam, then imipenem and cilastatin were used to treat the infection caused by XJ001 (PC1) in a case report.

== Diagnosis ==
Diagnosis of P. cumminsii infection is generally done through routine clinical microbiology procedures. This typically involves culturing the organism onto the appropriate media, such as agar plates or blood culture bottles, depending on the infection and sample type, followed by identification using MALDI-TOF mass spectrometry and/or genetic methods like 16S rRNA sequencing after incubation.

== Research ==
Further research and reporting of cases are needed to understand the epidemiology, pathogenesis, optimal treatment, and clinical outcomes associated with P. cumminsii infections.
