= Paeniglutamicibacter gangotriensis =

Scientific classification
- Domain: Bacteria
- Kingdom: Bacillati
- Phylum: Actinomycetota
- Class: Actinomycetes
- Order: Micrococcales
- Family: Micrococcaceae
- Genus: Paeniglutamicibacter
- Species: P. gangotriensis

Binomial name
- Paeniglutamicibacter gangotriensis (Gupta et al. 2004) Busse 2016

Type strain
- DSM 15796; JCM 12166; Lz1y

Synonyms
- Arthrobacter gangotriensis Gupta et al. 2004

Species of bacterium

Paeniglutamicibacter gangotriensis is a bacterium from the genus Paeniglutamicibacter which has been isolated from soil from the station Dakshin Gangotri in Antarctica.
