= Sinomonas echigonensis =

Scientific classification
- Domain: Bacteria
- Kingdom: Bacillati
- Phylum: Actinomycetota
- Class: Actinomycetes
- Order: Micrococcales
- Family: Micrococcaceae
- Genus: Sinomonas
- Species: S. echigonensis

Binomial name
- Sinomonas echigonensis (Ding et al. 2009) Zhou et al. 2012

Type strain
- LC10; CCTCC AB 206017; IAM 15385; JCM 21829

Synonyms
- Arthrobacter echigonensis Ding et al. 2009

Species of bacterium

Sinomonas echigonensis is a bacterium from the genus Sinomonas.
