= Sinomonas humi =

Scientific classification
- Domain: Bacteria
- Kingdom: Bacillati
- Phylum: Actinomycetota
- Class: Actinomycetes
- Order: Micrococcales
- Family: Micrococcaceae
- Genus: Sinomonas
- Species: S. humi

Binomial name
- Sinomonas humi Lee et al. 2015

Type strain
- DSM 29362; MCCC 1K00410; NBRC 110653; MUSC117

Species of bacterium

Sinomonas humi is a Gram-positive and non-motile bacterium from the genus Sinomonas which has been isolated from mangrove forest soil from the Tanjung Lumpur forest in Malaysia.
