= Glutamicibacter protophormiae =

Scientific classification
- Domain: Bacteria
- Kingdom: Bacillati
- Phylum: Actinomycetota
- Class: Actinomycetes
- Order: Micrococcales
- Family: Micrococcaceae
- Genus: Glutamicibacter
- Species: G. protophormiae

Binomial name
- Glutamicibacter protophormiae (Lysenko 1959) Busse 2016

Type strain
- ATCC 19271; CIP 106987; DSM 20168; IFO 12128; JCM 1973; LMG 16324; NBRC 12128; VKM Ac-2104

Synonyms
- Arthrobacter protophormiae (Lysenko 1959) Stackebrandt et al. 1984; Brevibacterium protophormiae Lysenko 1959 (Approved Lists 1980)

Species of bacterium

Glutamicibacter protophormiae is a bacterium belonging to the genus Glutamicibacter. It contains a glycolipid 3-[O-α-D-mannopyranosyl-(1→3)-O-α-D-mannopyranosyl]-sn-1,2-diglyceride (DMDG). It has peptidoglycan type A4α with a bridge of (Lys–Ala–L-Glu). It has unsaturated menaquinones, dominated by MK-8. It does not contain the lipid phosphatidylinositol.

The species was described by O. Lysenko in 1959 with genus Brevibacterium. B. protophormiae was reclassified in 1984 as Arthrobacter protophormiae and as Glutamicibacter protophormiae in 2016.

The cell wall of G. protophormiae contains a teichoic acid that contains glucose, glycerol, glucosamine, and galactosamine.
