= Pseudarthrobacter defluvii =

Scientific classification
- Domain: Bacteria
- Kingdom: Bacillati
- Phylum: Actinomycetota
- Class: Actinomycetes
- Order: Micrococcales
- Family: Micrococcaceae
- Genus: Pseudarthrobacter
- Species: P. defluvii

Binomial name
- Pseudarthrobacter defluvii (Kim et al. 2008) Busse 2016

Type strain
- 4C1-a; DSM 18782; KCTC 19209

Synonyms
- Arthrobacter defluvii Kim et al. 2008

Species of bacterium

Pseudarthrobacter defluvii is a bacterium species from the genus Pseudarthrobacter which has been isolated from sewage from the Geumho River near Daegu, Korea. Pseudarthrobacter defluvii has the ability to degrade 4-chlorophenol.
