= Glutamicibacter creatinolyticus =

Scientific classification
- Domain: Bacteria
- Kingdom: Bacillati
- Phylum: Actinomycetota
- Class: Actinomycetes
- Order: Micrococcales
- Family: Micrococcaceae
- Genus: Glutamicibacter
- Species: G. creatinolyticus

Binomial name
- Glutamicibacter creatinolyticus (Hou et al. 1998) Busse 2016

Type strain
- CIP 105749; GIFU 12498; JCM 10102

Synonyms
- Arthrobacter creatinolyticus Hou et al. 1998

Species of bacterium

Glutamicibacter creatinolyticus is a Gram-positive, non-spore-forming and aerobic bacterium from the genus Glutamicibacter which has been isolated from human urine in Japan.
