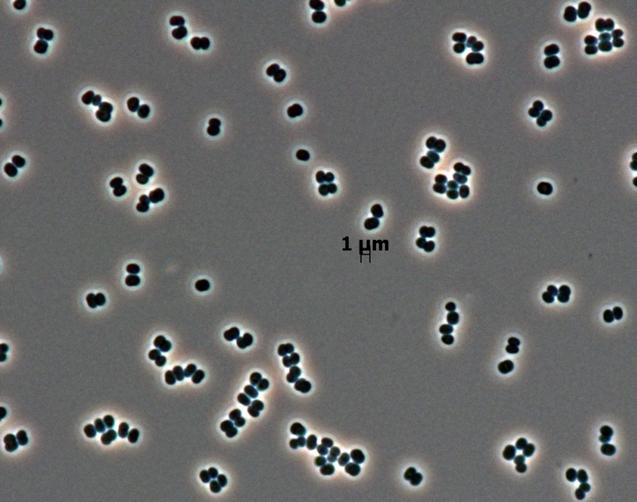
- Microscopic image

Scientific classification
- Domain: Bacteria
- Kingdom: Bacillati
- Phylum: Actinomycetota
- Class: Actinomycetes
- Order: Micrococcales
- Family: Micrococcaceae
- Genus: Tersicoccus
- Species: T. phoenicis

Binomial name
- Tersicoccus phoenicis Vaishampayan et al. 2013

Type strain
- 1P05MA; DSM 30849; NRRL B-59547

= Tersicoccus phoenicis =

Species of bacterium

Tersicoccus phoenicis is a member of the bacterial family Micrococcaceae. It has only been found in two spacecraft assembly clean room facilities and is resistant to the methods normally used to clean such facilities. The species name is derived from tersi, Latin for clean; coccus, Greek for berry; and phoenicis, from NASA's Phoenix lander, the spacecraft being prepared when these bacteria were first discovered.

== Occurrence ==
Tersicoccus phoenicis are only known to exist at two locations on Earth, and were independently found in geographically separated clean room facilities nearly 4,000 km (2,500 mi) apart. One example was located during a 2007 microbial test swabbing of the Phoenix lander's clean room floor in the Payload Hazardous Servicing Facility at Kennedy Space Center (Florida, United States), while the other was found in the Herschel Space Observatory's clean room at Guiana Space Centre (Kourou, French Guiana).

Parag Vaishampayan, a microbiologist with NASA's Jet Propulsion Laboratory, suggests that this species may exist naturally outside of the clean room environment but has not been seen before due to the difficulty in isolating a single microbe type among the wide variety of different types found in nature.

== Characteristics ==
These bacteria are non-spore-forming, aerobic, non-motile, and Gram-positive. They are roughly spherical (coccus) in shape and measure approximately 1 micrometre (0.00004 in) in diameter. This species maintains a coccal morphology throughout their growth; the rod–coccus life cycle typically observed in nearly all Arthrobacter species is not present. They are able to survive in environments with few nutrients.

Two strains of T. phoenicis are known to exist, one at each discovery site: 1P05MA^{T} at the American facility and KO_PS43 at the French Guianan facility.

== Significance ==
Because species like T. phoenicis are hardy enough to survive the sterilization measures used in spacecraft clean rooms, scientists study them and index their genetic material so that if a potential extraterrestrial bacterium were returned to Earth aboard a spacecraft, it could be compared to the index and ruled out as something that may have been originally launched with the spacecraft. Additionally, by examining the characteristics of resistant microbes such as T. phoenicis, scientists may be able to develop improved sterilization methods. This is necessary to prevent the contamination of other celestial bodies by organisms aboard visiting spacecraft, which may have already occurred with the Curiosity rover on Mars.

Research has demonstrated that T. phoenicis enters a viable but nonculturable dormant state under nutrient starvation and desiccation, allowing it to persist in oligotrophic and stressful environments like clean rooms, and this dormancy can be reversed using resuscitation-promoting factors from related species such as Micrococcus luteus. This ability has significant implications for planetary protection protocols, as it may explain the low detection rates of such microbes in spacecraft facilities and highlights the need for improved methods to identify and mitigate forward contamination risks in space missions.

== Recognition ==
On May 23, 2014, the International Institute for Species Exploration declared the bacterium as one of its "Top 10 New Species of 2014", selected from species discovered in 2013, due to the unusual location of its discovery and resistance to sterilization.

== See also ==
- Bacillus odysseyi
- Bacillus safensis
- Interplanetary contamination
