= Enteractinococcus helveticum =

Scientific classification
- Domain: Bacteria
- Kingdom: Bacillati
- Phylum: Actinomycetota
- Class: Actinomycetes
- Order: Micrococcales
- Family: Micrococcaceae
- Genus: Enteractinococcus
- Species: E. helveticum

Binomial name
- Enteractinococcus helveticum Crovadore et al. 2016

Species of bacterium

Enteractinococcus helveticum is a Gram-positive bacterium from the genus Enteractinococcus which has been isolated from industrial wastewater.
