= Sinomonas albida =

Scientific classification
- Domain: Bacteria
- Kingdom: Bacillati
- Phylum: Actinomycetota
- Class: Actinomycetes
- Order: Micrococcales
- Family: Micrococcaceae
- Genus: Sinomonas
- Species: S. albida

Binomial name
- Sinomonas albida (Ding et al. 2009) Zhou et al. 2012

Type strain
- LC13; NCIM 2447; CCTCC 206018; IAM 15386; JCM 21830

Synonyms
- Arthrobacter albidus Ding et al. 2009

Species of bacterium

Sinomonas albida is a Gram-positive, non-spore-forming and non-motile bacterium from the genus Sinomonas.
