= Yaniella flava =

Scientific classification
- Domain: Bacteria
- Kingdom: Bacillati
- Phylum: Actinomycetota
- Class: Actinomycetes
- Order: Micrococcales
- Family: Micrococcaceae
- Genus: Yaniella
- Species: Y. flava

Binomial name
- Yaniella flava (Li et al. 2005) Li et al. 2008

Type strain
- DSM 16377; JCM 13595; KCTC 19047; YIM 70178

Synonyms
- Yania flava Li et al. 2005

Species of bacterium

Yaniella flava is a Gram-negative, aerobic, non-spore-forming and non-motile bacterium from the genus Yaniella which has been isolated from saline soil from the Qinghai Province in China.
