= Sinomonas susongensis =

Scientific classification
- Domain: Bacteria
- Kingdom: Bacillati
- Phylum: Actinomycetota
- Class: Actinomycetes
- Order: Micrococcales
- Family: Micrococcaceae
- Genus: Sinomonas
- Species: S. susongensis

Binomial name
- Sinomonas susongensis Bao et al. 2015

Type strain
- CCTCC AB 2014068; DSM 28245; A31

Species of bacterium

Sinomonas susongensis is a bacterium from the genus Sinomonas which has been isolated from the surface of a weathered biotite from Susong, China.
