= Glutamicibacter halophytocola =

Scientific classification
- Domain: Bacteria
- Kingdom: Bacillati
- Phylum: Actinomycetota
- Class: Actinomycetes
- Order: Micrococcales
- Family: Micrococcaceae
- Genus: Glutamicibacter
- Species: G. halophytocola

Binomial name
- Glutamicibacter halophytocola Feng et al. 2017

Type strain
- DSM 101718; KCTC 39692; KLBMP 5180

Species of bacterium

Glutamicibacter halophytocola is a Gram-positive, aerobic non-motile bacterium from the genus Glutamicibacter which has been isolated from the roots of the plant Limonium sinense from Lianyungang, China.
