= Pseudarthrobacter chlorophenolicus =

Scientific classification
- Domain: Bacteria
- Kingdom: Bacillati
- Phylum: Actinomycetota
- Class: Actinomycetes
- Order: Micrococcales
- Family: Micrococcaceae
- Genus: Pseudarthrobacter
- Species: P. chlorophenolicus

Binomial name
- Pseudarthrobacter chlorophenolicus (Westerberg et al. 2000) Busse 2016

Type strain
- A6; ATCC 700700; CIP 107037; DSM 12829; JCM 12360

Synonyms
- Arthrobacter chlorophenolicus Westerberg et al. 2000

Species of bacterium

Pseudarthrobacter chlorophenolicus is a species of bacteria capable of degrading high concentrations of 4-chlorophenol, hence its name. As such, it may be useful in bioremediation.
