= Yaniella halotolerans =

Scientific classification
- Domain: Bacteria
- Kingdom: Bacillati
- Phylum: Actinomycetota
- Class: Actinomycetes
- Order: Micrococcales
- Family: Micrococcaceae
- Genus: Yaniella
- Species: Y. halotolerans

Binomial name
- Yaniella halotolerans (Li et al. 2004) Li et al. 2008

Type strain
- CCTCC AA001023; DSM 15476; JCM 13527; YIM 70085

Synonyms
- Yania halotolerans Li et al. 2004

Species of bacterium

Yaniella halotolerans is a Gram-negative, aerobic, halotolerant, non-spore-forming and non-motile bacterium from the genus Yaniella which has been isolated from saline soil from Xijiang, China.
