= Citricoccus alkalitolerans =

Scientific classification
- Domain: Bacteria
- Kingdom: Bacillati
- Phylum: Actinomycetota
- Class: Actinomycetes
- Order: Micrococcales
- Family: Micrococcaceae
- Genus: Citricoccus
- Species: C. alkalitolerans

Binomial name
- Citricoccus alkalitolerans Li et al. 2005

Type strain
- CCTCC AA 203008; CCTCC AA 20308; CCUG 51943; CIP 107968; DSM 15665; JCM 13012; KCTC 19012; YIM 70010

Species of bacterium

Citricoccus alkalitolerans is an alkalitolerant bacterium from the genus Citricoccus which has been isolated from soil from the eastern desert of Egypt.
