= Enteractinococcus fodinae =

Scientific classification
- Domain: Bacteria
- Kingdom: Bacillati
- Phylum: Actinomycetota
- Class: Actinomycetes
- Order: Micrococcales
- Family: Micrococcaceae
- Genus: Enteractinococcus
- Species: E. fodinae

Binomial name
- Enteractinococcus fodinae (Dhanjal et al. 2011) Cao et al. 2012

Type strain
- G5

Species of bacterium

Enteractinococcus fodinae is a bacterium from the genus of Enteractinococcus.
