= Galactobacter caseinivorans =

Scientific classification
- Domain: Bacteria
- Kingdom: Bacillati
- Phylum: Actinomycetota
- Class: Actinomycetes
- Order: Micrococcales
- Family: Micrococcaceae
- Genus: Galactobacter
- Species: G. caseinivorans

Binomial name
- Galactobacter caseinivorans Hahne et al. 2019

Type strain
- JZ R-183

Species of bacterium

Galactobacter caseinivorans is a Gram-positive and rod-shaped bacterium from the genus Galactobacter which has been isolated from raw cow milk from Germany.
