= Paeniglutamicibacter psychrophenolicus =

Scientific classification
- Domain: Bacteria
- Kingdom: Bacillati
- Phylum: Actinomycetota
- Class: Actinomycetes
- Order: Micrococcales
- Family: Micrococcaceae
- Genus: Paeniglutamicibacter
- Species: P. psychrophenolicus

Binomial name
- Paeniglutamicibacter psychrophenolicus (Margesin et al. 2004) Busse 2016

Type strain
- DSM 15454; JCM 13568; LMG 21914; AG31

Synonyms
- Arthrobacter psychrophenolicus Margesin et al. 2004

Species of bacterium

Paeniglutamicibacter psychrophenolicus is a Gram-positive, non-spore-forming, aerobic, rod-coccus, facultatively psychrophilic and non-motile bacterium from the genus Paeniglutamicibacter which has been isolated from an alpine ice cave in Salzburg, Austria.
