= Rothia mucilaginosa =

Scientific classification
- Domain: Bacteria
- Kingdom: Bacillati
- Phylum: Actinomycetota
- Class: Actinomycetes
- Order: Micrococcales
- Family: Micrococcaceae
- Genus: Rothia
- Species: R. mucilaginosa

Binomial name
- Rothia mucilaginosa (Bergan and Kocur 1982) Collins et al. 2000

Type strain
- ATCC 25296; CCM 2417; CCUG 20962; CIP 71.14; DSM 20746; IFO 15673; JCM 10910; NBRC 15673; NCTC 10663

Synonyms
- "Micrococcus mucilaginosus" Migula 1900; "Staphylococcus salivarius" Andrewes and Gordon 1907; Stomatococcus mucilaginosus (ex Migula 1900) Bergan and Kocur 1982

Species of bacterium

Rothia mucilaginosa is a Gram-positive, coagulase-negative, encapsulated, non-spore-forming and non-motile coccus, present in clusters, tetrads or pairs that is a part of the normal oropharyngeal flora. Belonging to the family Micrococcaceae, it was first isolated from the mucous membrane of the cheek and gingiva. It is an oral commensal, that has been linked to causing severe bacteremia in immunocompromised patients. This bacterium has also been shown to form biofilms, similar to that of Pseudomonas aeruginosa. R. mucilaginosa is a cohabitant in the lower airways of patients with chronic lung diseases such as bronchiectasis, however has been shown to elicit anti-inflammatory effects.

== Morphology ==
Rothia mucilaginosa is a Gram-positive, coagulase-negative, encapsulated, non-spore-forming and non-motile coccus, present in clusters, tetrads or pairs. R. mucilaginosa can easily be confused for the bacteria from the genera Micrococcus and Staphylococcus. One way that it can be distinguished from those two is by its strong adherence to the solid medium substrate that its colonies form. Another way is by its weak or absent catalase reaction, failure to grow on 5% NaCl media or its glucose and sucrose fermentation.

== Pathology ==
Rothia mucilaginosa is a common oropharyngeal commensal bacteria that has also been detected in the lower airways of people with Bronchiectasis. Its role in chronic lung disease is complex with some studies showing it has pro-inflammatory properties and others showing anti-inflammatory properties. Specifically, it has been shown to induce the inhibition of the COX-2 inhibitor, which is largely related to an increased production of PGE_{2}, which has been shown to be immunosuppressive in animal models of bacterial pneumonias and sepsis. The inhibition of COX-2 improved survival in mice, suggesting that the pathogenic effects of R. mucilaginosa are related to the induction of COX-2 It is also closely associated with Bacteremia, sepsis, and endocarditis.

== Antibiotics ==
Rothia mucilaginosa is resistant to the quinolone class of antibiotics, with extreme resistance to fluoroquinolones. Sensitivity, as of 2003, is still found in trimethoprim-sulfamethoxazole, vancomycin and bacitracin.

== Metabolism ==
The metabolism of Rothia mucilaginosa has been subject to computer modeling with experimental validation, resulting in a genome-scale metabolic model named iRM23NL, which is available from the BioModels Database.
