= Fructan beta-(2,1)-fructosidase =

Identifiers
- EC no.: 3.2.1.153
- CAS no.: 1000593-08-7

Databases
- IntEnz: IntEnz view
- BRENDA: BRENDA entry
- ExPASy: NiceZyme view
- KEGG: KEGG entry
- MetaCyc: metabolic pathway
- PRIAM: profile
- PDB structures: RCSB PDB PDBe PDBsum
Search
- PMC: articles
- PubMed: articles
- NCBI: proteins

Fructan beta-(2,1)-fructosidase (EC 3.2.1.153, beta-(2-1)-D-fructan fructohydrolase, beta-(2-1)fructan exohydrolase, inulinase, 1-FEH II, 1-fructan exohydrolase, 1-FEH w1, 1-FEH w2, beta-(2-1)-linkage-specific fructan-beta-fructosidase, beta-(2,1)-D-fructan fructohydrolase) is an enzyme with systematic name beta-(2->1)-D-fructan fructohydrolase. This enzyme catalyses the following chemical reaction

Hydrolysis of terminal, non-reducing (2->1)-linked beta-D-fructofuranose residues in fructans

The best substrates are the inulin-type fructans.
