= Citricoccus parietis =

Scientific classification
- Domain: Bacteria
- Kingdom: Bacillati
- Phylum: Actinomycetota
- Class: Actinomycetes
- Order: Micrococcales
- Family: Micrococcaceae
- Genus: Citricoccus
- Species: C. parietis

Binomial name
- Citricoccus parietis Schäfer et al. 2010

Type strain
- CCM 7609; CCUG 57388; 02-Je-010

Species of bacterium

Citricoccus parietis is a Gram-positive and coccoid-shaped bacterium from the genus Citricoccus which has been isolated from a mould-colonized wall in Jena, Germany.
