= Zhihengliuella alba =

Scientific classification
- Domain: Bacteria
- Kingdom: Bacillati
- Phylum: Actinomycetota
- Class: Actinomycetes
- Order: Micrococcales
- Family: Micrococcaceae
- Genus: Zhihengliuella
- Species: Z. alba

Binomial name
- Zhihengliuella alba Tang et al. 2009

Type strain
- DSM 21143; JCM 16961; KCTC 19375; YIM 90734

Species of bacterium

Zhihengliuella alba is a Gram-positive, non-motile, white-pigmented, short rod actinobacterium.
