= Pseudarthrobacter enclensis =

Scientific classification
- Domain: Bacteria
- Kingdom: Bacillati
- Phylum: Actinomycetota
- Class: Actinomycetes
- Order: Micrococcales
- Family: Micrococcaceae
- Genus: Pseudarthrobacter
- Species: P. enclensis

Binomial name
- Pseudarthrobacter enclensis (Dastager et al. 2015) Busse and Schumann 2019

Type strain
- NIO-08; DSM 25279; NCIM 5488; NIO-1008

Synonyms
- Arthrobacter enclensis Dastager et al. 2015

Species of bacterium

Pseudarthrobacter enclensis is a Gram-positive and non-motile bacterium species from the genus Pseudarthrobacter which has been isolated from marine sediments from Chorão Island, Goa, India.
