= Glutamicibacter endophyticus =

Scientific classification
- Domain: Bacteria
- Kingdom: Bacillati
- Phylum: Actinomycetota
- Class: Actinomycetes
- Order: Micrococcales
- Family: Micrococcaceae
- Genus: Glutamicibacter
- Species: G. endophyticus

Binomial name
- Glutamicibacter endophyticus (Wang et al. 2015) Busse and Schumann 2019

Type strain
- EGI 6500322; CTC 29490; JCM 30091

Synonyms
- Arthrobacter endophyticus Wang et al. 2015

Species of bacterium

Glutamicibacter endophyticus is a Gram-positive, aerobic and non-motile bacterium from the genus Glutamicibacter which has been isolated from the roots of the plant Salsola affinis in Urumqi, China.
