= Sinomonas notoginsengisoli =

Scientific classification
- Domain: Bacteria
- Kingdom: Bacillati
- Phylum: Actinomycetota
- Class: Actinomycetes
- Order: Micrococcales
- Family: Micrococcaceae
- Genus: Sinomonas
- Species: S. notoginsengisoli

Binomial name
- Sinomonas notoginsengisoli Zhang et al. 2015

Type strain
- DSM 27685; KCTC 29237; SYP-B575

Species of bacterium

Sinomonas notoginsengisoli is a Gram-positive, aerobic and non-motile bacterium from the genus Sinomonas which has been isolated from rhizospheric soil from the plant Panax notoginseng from the Wenshan district of China.
