= Sinomonas halotolerans =

Scientific classification
- Domain: Bacteria
- Kingdom: Bacillati
- Phylum: Actinomycetota
- Class: Actinomycetes
- Order: Micrococcales
- Family: Micrococcaceae
- Genus: Sinomonas
- Species: S. halotolerans

Binomial name
- Sinomonas halotolerans Guo et al. 2016

Type strain
- CCTCC AB2014300; JCM 31751; KCTC 39116; CFH S0499

Species of bacterium

Sinomonas halotolerans is a Gram-positive, aerobic and non-motile bacterium from the genus Sinomonas which has been isolated from soil from Halong Bay in Vietnam.
