= Enteractinococcus coprophilus =

Scientific classification
- Domain: Bacteria
- Kingdom: Bacillati
- Phylum: Actinomycetota
- Class: Actinomycetes
- Order: Micrococcales
- Family: Micrococcaceae
- Genus: Enteractinococcus
- Species: E. coprophilus

Binomial name
- Enteractinococcus coprophilus Cao et al. 2012

Type strain
- YIM 100590

Species of bacterium

Enteractinococcus coprophilus is a bacterium from the genus of Enteractinococcus which has been isolated from the faeces of the Panthera tigris amoyensis from the Yunnan Wild Animal Park in China.
