= Paeniglutamicibacter sulfureus =

Scientific classification
- Domain: Bacteria
- Kingdom: Bacillati
- Phylum: Actinomycetota
- Class: Actinomycetes
- Order: Micrococcales
- Family: Micrococcaceae
- Genus: Paeniglutamicibacter
- Species: P. sulfureus

Binomial name
- Paeniglutamicibacter sulfureus (Stackebrandt et al. 1984) Busse 2016

Type strain
- ATCC 19098; BZ73; CIP 106986; DSM 20167; IFO 12678; JCM 1338; LMG 16694; NBRC 12678; NRRL B-14730

Synonyms
- Arthrobacter sulfureus Stackebrandt et al. 1984

Species of bacterium

Paeniglutamicibacter sulfureus is a bacterium from the genus Paeniglutamicibacter which has been isolated from oil brine.
