= Sinomonas flava =

Scientific classification
- Domain: Bacteria
- Kingdom: Bacillati
- Phylum: Actinomycetota
- Class: Actinomycetes
- Order: Micrococcales
- Family: Micrococcaceae
- Genus: Sinomonas
- Species: S. flava

Binomial name
- Sinomonas flava Zhou et al. 2009

Type strain
- CCTCC AB 207194; JCM 16034; KCTC 19388; CW 108

Species of bacterium

Sinomonas flava is a strictly aerobic and non-motile bacterium from the genus Sinomonas which has been isolated from forest soil from the Anhui Province in China.
