= Glutamicibacter ardleyensis =

Scientific classification
- Domain: Bacteria
- Kingdom: Bacillati
- Phylum: Actinomycetota
- Class: Actinomycetes
- Order: Micrococcales
- Family: Micrococcaceae
- Genus: Glutamicibacter
- Species: G. ardleyensis

Binomial name
- Glutamicibacter ardleyensis (Chen et al. 2005) Busse 2016

Type strain
- An24; An25; ZX6; CGMCC 1.3685; JCM 12921

Synonyms
- Arthrobacter ardleyensis Chen et al. 2005

Species of bacterium

Glutamicibacter ardleyensis is a psychrotrophic and rod-coccus bacterium from the genus Glutamicibacter.
