= Citricoccus =

Scientific classification
- Domain: Bacteria
- Kingdom: Bacillati
- Phylum: Actinomycetota
- Class: Actinomycetes
- Order: Micrococcales
- Family: Micrococcaceae
- Genus: Citricoccus; Altenburger et al. 2002

Type species
- Citricoccus muralis Altenburger et al. 2002

Species
- C. alkalitolerans Li et al. 2005; C. lacusdiani Zhang et al. 2021; "C. massiliensis" Ndiaye et al. 2018; C. muralis Altenburger et al. 2002; C. nitrophenolicus Nielsen et al. 2012; C. parietis Schäfer et al. 2010; "C. yambaruensis" Matsui et al. 2012; C. zhacaiensis Meng et al. 2010

Genus of bacteria

Citricoccus is a gram-positive and non-motile genus of bacteria from the family Micrococcaceae.
