= Pseudarthrobacter =

Scientific classification
- Domain: Bacteria
- Kingdom: Bacillati
- Phylum: Actinomycetota
- Class: Actinomycetes
- Order: Micrococcales
- Family: Micrococcaceae
- Genus: Pseudarthrobacter; Busse 2016

Type species
- Pseudarthrobacter polychromogenes (Schippers-Lammertse et al. 1963) Busse 2016

Species
- P. albicanus Chen et al. 2022; P. chlorophenolicus (Westerberg et al. 2000) Busse 2016; P. defluvii (Kim et al. 2008) Busse 2016; P. enclensis (Dastager et al. 2015) Busse and Schumann 2019; P. equi (Yassin et al. 2011) Busse 2016; P. niigatensis (Ding et al. 2009) Busse 2016; P. oxydans (Sguros 1954) Busse 2016; P. phenanthrenivorans (Kallimanis et al. 2009) Busse 2016; P. polychromogenes (Schippers-Lammertse et al. 1963) Busse 2016; P. psychrotolerans Shin et al. 2020; P. eromae (Huang et al. 2005) Busse 2016; P. siccitolerans (SantaCruz-Calvo et al. 2013) Busse 2016; P. sulfonivorans (Borodina et al. 2002) Busse 2016

Genus of bacteria

Pseudarthrobacter is a genus of bacteria from the family Micrococcaceae.
