= Neomicrococcus =

Scientific classification
- Domain: Bacteria
- Kingdom: Bacillati
- Phylum: Actinomycetota
- Class: Actinomycetes
- Order: Micrococcales
- Family: Micrococcaceae
- Genus: Neomicrococcus; Prakash et al. 2015

Type species
- Neomicrococcus aestuarii (Baik et al. 2011) Prakash et al. 2015

Species
- N. aestuarii (Baik et al. 2011) Prakash et al. 2015; N. lactis (Chittpurna et al. 2011) Prakash et al. 2015

Genus of bacteria

Neomicrococcus is a genus of bacteria from the family Micrococcaceae.
