= Acaricomes phytoseiuli =

Scientific classification
- Domain: Bacteria
- Kingdom: Bacillati
- Phylum: Actinomycetota
- Class: Actinomycetes
- Order: Micrococcales
- Family: Micrococcaceae
- Genus: Acaricomes; Pukall et al. 2006
- Species: A. phytoseiuli

Binomial name
- Acaricomes phytoseiuli Pukall et al. 2006

Species of bacterium

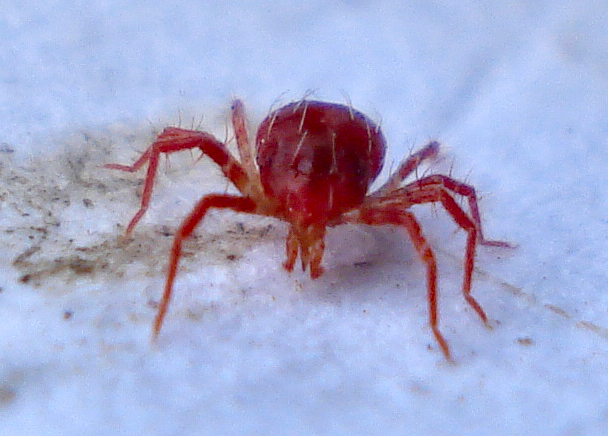
Phytoseiulus persimilis mite: The organism from which Acaricomes phytoseiuli was isolated

Acaricomes phytoseiuli is a bacterium which is thought to be a pathogen of the mite Phytoseiulus persimilis. A. phytoseiuli causes a set of symptoms in the mite, known as nonresponding syndrome or NR syndrome. Dramatic changes in longevity, fecundity, and behavior are characteristic with this disease. The bacteria accumulate in the lumen of the mite's digestive tract and cause extreme degeneration of its epithelium. Infection with A. phytoseiuli greatly reduces the mite's attraction to herbivore-induced plant volatiles, and the mite is more prone to leave patches with ample prey. The disease is transmitted horizontally by means of feces and debris. The strain that was isolated was “CSC” (=DSM 14247T=CCUG 49701T). Differences between strain CSC compared to its closest phylogenetic neighbors are as follows: CSC uses glucose-1-phosphate and L-glutamic acid, and its colonies are more yellow in appearance as compared to its phylogenetic neighbors which are more cream/white in color.

== Cell morphology ==
Using a phase-contrast microscope, cells appear as small, short rods, 0.5-0.8 x 1.0-1.5 μm in size. Optimal growth temperature for this organism is 25 °C, with growth observed within the temperature range 15- 30 °C. To the naked eye, on a Trypticase soy agar (TSA) plate, colonies appear smooth, circular, yellowish, and 1–2 mm in diameter. Growth can occur at pH values ranging from 6.0 to 9.5, with an optimal range of 6.0 to 8.0. A. phytoseiuli tests negative for the Oxidase reaction, but catalase activity is detectable. Trypticase soy agar (TSA) or trypticase soy broth (TSB) are the appropriate growth media for this organism. G+C content is 57.7%. Acaricomes phytoseiuli is a Gram-positive, aerobic, nonmotile and non-spore-forming organism. Its peptidoglycan consists of the amino acids lysine, alanine, and glutamic acid in the respective ratios: 1.0:4.9:1.0. Cell wall sugars consist of galactose and glucose. The main fatty acids determined in this organism include 12-methyltetradecanoic acid and 14-methylhexadecanoic acid.

== Genetics ==
Initial 16S rRNA and fatty acid analyses show that the CSC strain was related to the genus Arthrobacter. However, subsequent phylogenetic analysis of strain CSC, various Arthrobacter isolates, and other strains related to CSC revealed an identity with Arthroboacter of only 94.8%. This finding indicated that the strain CSC was a new species in a new genus.

== History ==
Acaricomes phytoseiuli was originally isolated in the Netherlands from a diseased, surface-sterilized specimen of a female Phytoseiulus persimilis Athias-Henriot mite.

== Nomenclature ==
The etymology of the genus is N.L. masc. pl. n. acari, the mites; L. masc. n. comes, companion; N.L. masc. n. Acaricomes, companion of mites. The etymology of the species is N.L. gen. masc. n. phytoseiuli, of Phytoseiulus, the nomenclatural genus name of the host mite.)
