= Sinomonas =

Scientific classification
- Domain: Bacteria
- Kingdom: Bacillati
- Phylum: Actinomycetota
- Class: Actinomycetes
- Order: Micrococcales
- Family: Micrococcaceae
- Genus: Sinomonas; Zhou et al. 2009

Type species
- Sinomonas flava Zhou et al. 2009

Species
- S. albida (Ding et al. 2009) Zhou et al. 2012; S. atrocyanea (Kuhn and Starr 1960) Zhou et al. 2009; S. echigonensis (Ding et al. 2009) Zhou et al. 2012; S. flava Zhou et al. 2009; "S. gamaensis" Fu et al. 2019; S. halotolerans Guo et al. 2016; S. humi Lee et al. 2015; S. mesophila Prabhu et al. 2015; S. notoginsengisoli Zhang et al. 2015; S. soli Zhou et al. 2012; S. susongensis Bao et al. 2015

Genus of bacteria

Sinomonas is a Gram-positive genus of bacteria from the family Micrococcaceae.
