= Micrococcoides hystricis =

Scientific classification
- Domain: Bacteria
- Kingdom: Bacillati
- Phylum: Actinomycetota
- Class: Actinomycetes
- Order: Micrococcales
- Family: Micrococcaceae
- Genus: Micrococcoides; Tóth et al. 2017
- Species: M. hystricis

Binomial name
- Micrococcoides hystricis Tóth et al. 2017

Type strain
- DSM 29785; NCAIM B.02604; TSL3

Genus of bacteria

Micrococcoides hystricis is a Gram-positive species of bacteria from the family Micrococcaceae which has been isolated from the faeces of an Indian crested porcupine from the Budapest Zoo and Botanical Garden in Hungary.
