= Yaniella =

Scientific classification
- Domain: Bacteria
- Kingdom: Bacillati
- Phylum: Actinomycetota
- Class: Actinomycetes
- Order: Micrococcales
- Family: Micrococcaceae
- Genus: Yaniella; Li et al. 2008

Type species
- Yaniella halotolerans (Li et al. 2004) Li et al. 2008

Species
- Y. flava (Li et al. 2005) Li et al. 2008; Y. halotolerans (Li et al. 2004) Li et al. 2008; Y. soli Chen et al. 2012

Synonyms
- Yania Li et al. 2004

Genus of bacteria

Yaniella is a genus of bacteria from the family Micrococcaceae. Yaniella is named after the Chinese microbiologist Sun-Chu Yan.
