= Tersicoccus =

Scientific classification
- Domain: Bacteria
- Kingdom: Bacillati
- Phylum: Actinomycetota
- Class: Actinomycetes
- Order: Micrococcales
- Family: Micrococcaceae
- Genus: Tersicoccus; Vaishampayan et al. 2013

Type species
- Tersicoccus phoenicis Vaishampayan et al. 2013

Species
- T. phoenicis Vaishampayan et al. 2013; T. solisilvae Sultanpuram et al. 2016

Genus of bacteria

Tersicoccus is a Gram-positive genus of bacteria from the family Micrococcaceae.
