= Glutamicibacter =

Scientific classification
- Domain: Bacteria
- Kingdom: Bacillati
- Phylum: Actinomycetota
- Class: Actinomycetes
- Order: Micrococcales
- Family: Micrococcaceae
- Genus: Glutamicibacter; Busse 2016

Type species
- Glutamicibacter protophormiae (Lysenko 1959) Busse 2016

Species
- G. ardleyensis (Chen et al. 2005) Busse 2016; G. arilaitensis (Irlinger et al. 2005) Busse 2016; G. bergerei (Irlinger et al. 2005) Busse 2016; G. creatinolyticus (Hou et al. 1998) Busse 2016; G. endophyticus (Wang et al. 2015) Busse and Schumann 2019; G. halophytocola Feng et al. 2017; G. mishrai Das et al. 2020; G. nicotianae (Giovannozzi-Sermanni 1959) Busse 2016; G. protophormiae (Lysenko 1959) Busse 2016; G. soli (Roh et al. 2008) Busse 2016; G. uratoxydans (Stackebrandt et al. 1984) Busse 2016

Genus of bacteria

Glutamicibacter is a genus of bacteria from the family Micrococcaceae.
