= Garicola koreensis =

Scientific classification
- Domain: Bacteria
- Kingdom: Bacillati
- Phylum: Actinomycetota
- Class: Actinomycetes
- Order: Micrococcales
- Family: Micrococcaceae
- Genus: Garicola; Lo et al. 2015
- Species: G. koreensis

Binomial name
- Garicola koreensis Lo et al. 2015

Type strain
- DSM 28238; JCM 18572; KACC 16909; SJ5-4

Genus of bacteria

Garicola koreensis is a Gram-positive, aerobic, non-endospore-forming, moderately halophilic and non-motile species of bacteria from the family Micrococcaceae which has been isolated from Saeu-jeot in Korea.
