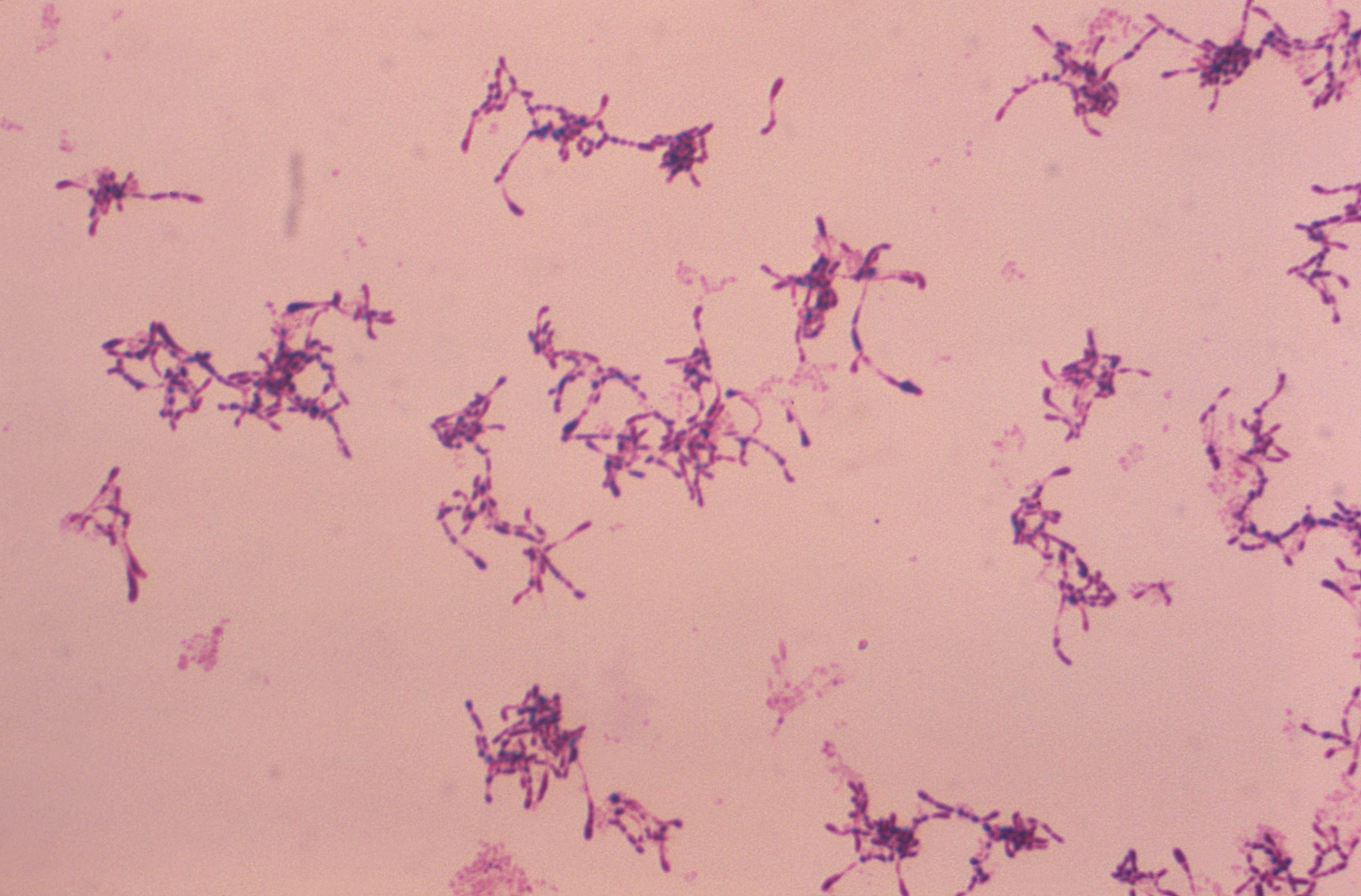
- Rothia dentocariosa, Gram stain.

Scientific classification
- Domain: Bacteria
- Kingdom: Bacillati
- Phylum: Actinomycetota
- Class: Actinomycetes
- Order: Micrococcales
- Family: Micrococcaceae
- Genus: Rothia; Georg and Brown 1967 (Approved Lists 1980)

Type species
- Rothia dentocariosa corrig. (Onishi 1949) Georg and Brown 1967 (Approved Lists 1980)

Species
- R. aeria Li et al. 2004; R. aerolata Kämpfer et al. 2016; R. amarae Fan et al. 2002; R. dentocariosa corrig. (Onishi 1949) Georg and Brown 1967 (Approved Lists 1980); R. endophytica Xiong et al. 2013; R. halotolerans (Tang et al. 2009) Nouioui et al. 2018; R. koreensis (Park et al. 2010) Nouioui et al. 2018; R. kristinae (Kloos et al. 1974) Nouioui et al. 2018; R. mucilaginosa (Bergan and Kocur 1982) Collins et al. 2000; R. nasimurium Collins et al. 2000; R. terrae Chou et al. 2008; R. uropygialis (Braun et al. 2018) Ghodhbane-Gtari et al. 2024; R. uropygioeca (Braun et al. 2018) Ghodhbane-Gtari et al. 2024

Synonyms
- Stomatococcus Bergan and Kocur 1982

= Rothia (bacterium) =

Genus of bacteria

Rothia is a Gram-positive, aerobic, rod-shaped and non-motile bacterial genus from the family Micrococcaceae. Three species within Rothia have been shown to colonize humans: R. dentocariosa, R. mucilaginosa, and R. aeria. These species are considered to be commensal, but they can cause disease in immunosuppressed humans.

Rothia spp. are prevalent in human saliva and produce enterobactin. They are also prevalent in the human gut and can cause the emergence of gastric atrophy and intestinal metaplasia.

Rothia spp. have been isolated from diverse habitats, including humans, livestock, and natural and built environments. As of 2025, 13 species have been validly published and are recognized as members of the genus Rothia.
