= Paeniglutamicibacter =

Scientific classification
- Domain: Bacteria
- Kingdom: Bacillati
- Phylum: Actinomycetota
- Class: Actinomycetes
- Order: Micrococcales
- Family: Micrococcaceae
- Genus: Paeniglutamicibacter; Busse 2016

Type species
- Paeniglutamicibacter sulfureus (Stackebrandt et al. 1984) Busse 2016

Species
- P. antarcticus (Pindi et al. 2010) Busse 2016; P. cryotolerans (Ganzert et al. 2011) Busse 2016; P. gangotriensis (Gupta et al. 2004) Busse 2016; P. kerguelensis (Gupta et al. 2004) Busse 2016; P. psychrophenolicus (Margesin et al. 2004) Busse 2016; P. sulfureus (Stackebrandt et al. 1984) Busse 2016; P. terrestris Sakdapetsiri et al. 2021

Genus of bacteria

Paeniglutamicibacter is a genus of bacteria from the family Micrococcaceae.
