= Falsarthrobacter nasiphocae =

Scientific classification
- Domain: Bacteria
- Kingdom: Bacillati
- Phylum: Actinomycetota
- Class: Actinomycetes
- Order: Micrococcales
- Family: Micrococcaceae
- Genus: Falsarthrobacter; Busse and Moore 2018
- Species: F. nasiphocae

Binomial name
- Falsarthrobacter nasiphocae (Collins et al. 2002) Busse and Moore 2018

Type strain
- CCUG 42953; CIP 107054; DSM 13988; JCM 11677; M597/99/10

Synonyms
- Arthrobacter nasiphocae Collins et al. 2002

Genus of bacteria

Falsarthrobacter nasiphocae is a species of bacteria from the family Micrococcaceae.
