= Auritidibacter ignavus =

Scientific classification
- Domain: Bacteria
- Kingdom: Bacillati
- Phylum: Actinomycetota
- Class: Actinomycetes
- Order: Micrococcales
- Family: Micrococcaceae
- Genus: Auritidibacter; Yassin et al. 2011
- Species: A. ignavus

Binomial name
- Auritidibacter ignavus Yassin et al. 2011

Type strain
- CCUG 57943; DSM 45359; IMMIB L-1656

Genus of bacteria

Auritidibacter ignavus is a Gram-positive, aerobic, non-spore-forming and rod-shaped species of bacteria from the family Micrococcaceae which has been isolated from an ear swab in Bad Orb, Germany.
