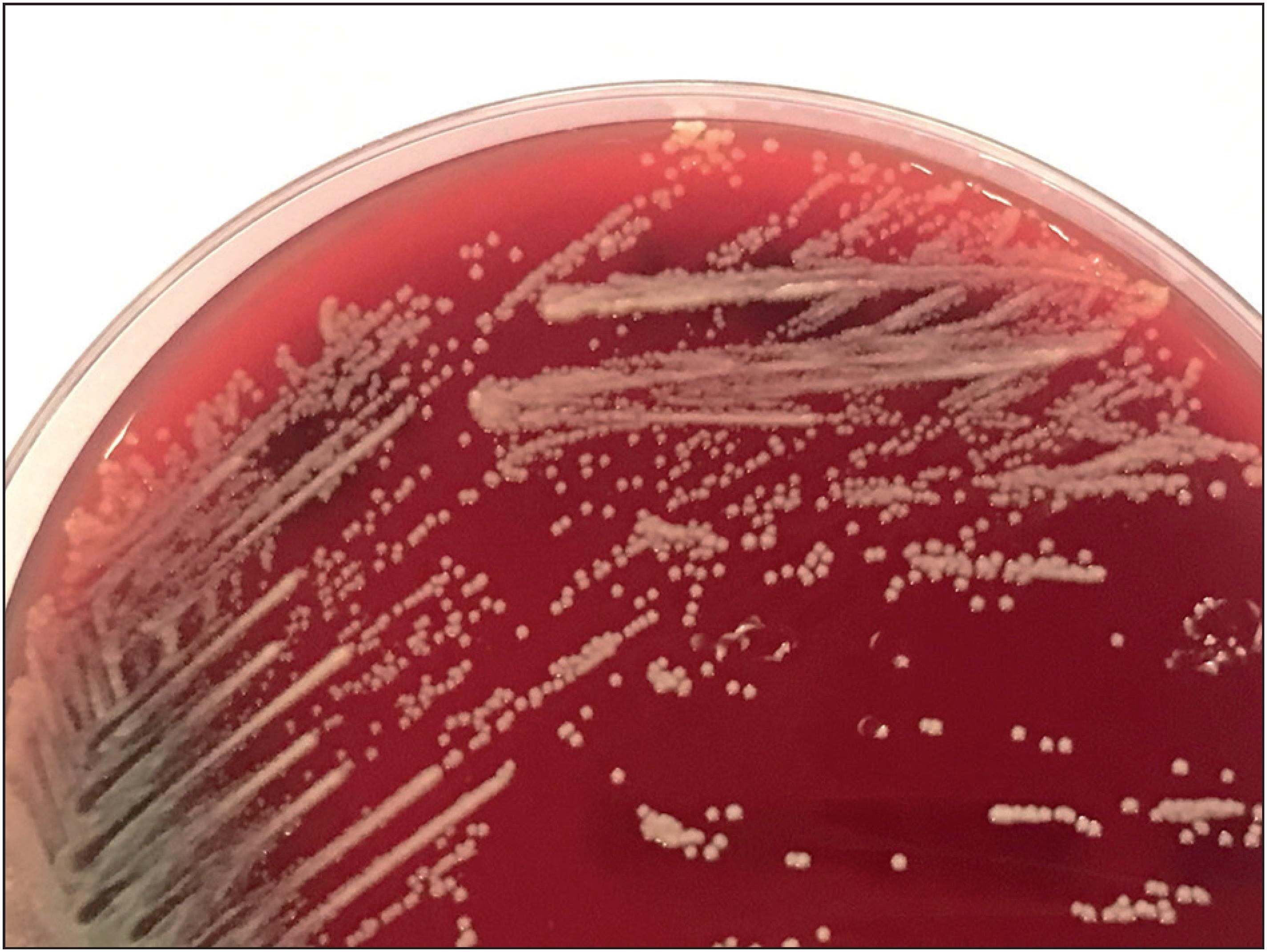
- Culture of P. cumminsii incubated on sheep blood agar

Scientific classification
- Domain: Bacteria
- Kingdom: Bacillati
- Phylum: Actinomycetota
- Class: Actinomycetes
- Order: Micrococcales
- Family: Micrococcaceae
- Genus: Pseudoglutamicibacter; Busse HJ, 2016

Type species
- Pseudoglutamicibacter cumminsii

Synonyms
- Arthrobacter Funke et.al 1997

= Pseudoglutamicibacter =

Genus of bacteria

Pseudoglutamicibacter is a genus of bacteria. As of 2025, the genus contains two species: P. cumminsii and P. albus.
