= Galactobacter =

Scientific classification
- Domain: Bacteria
- Kingdom: Bacillati
- Phylum: Actinomycetota
- Class: Actinomycetes
- Order: Micrococcales
- Family: Micrococcaceae
- Genus: Galactobacter; Hahne et al. 2019

Type species
- Galactobacter caseinivorans Hahne et al. 2019

Species
- G. caseinivorans Hahne et al. 2019; G. valiniphilus Hahne et al. 2019

Genus of bacteria

Galactobacter is a Gram-positive and rod-shaped genus of bacteria from the family Micrococcaceae.
