= Enteractinococcus =

Scientific classification
- Domain: Bacteria
- Kingdom: Bacillati
- Phylum: Actinomycetota
- Class: Actinomycetes
- Order: Micrococcales
- Family: Micrococcaceae
- Genus: Enteractinococcus; Cao et al. 2012

Type species
- Enteractinococcus coprophilus Cao et al. 2012

Species
- E. coprophilus Cao et al. 2012; E. fodinae (Dhanjal et al. 2011) Cao et al. 2012; "E. helveticum" Crovadore et al. 2016; "E. lamae" Chen et al. 2015; "E. viverrae" Chen et al. 2015

Genus of bacteria

Enteractinococcus is a Gram-positive genus of bacteria from the family Micrococcaceae.
