= Haematomicrobium sanguinis =

Scientific classification
- Domain: Bacteria
- Kingdom: Bacillati
- Phylum: Actinomycetota
- Class: Actinomycetes
- Order: Micrococcales
- Family: Micrococcaceae
- Genus: Haematomicrobium; Schumann and Busse 2017
- Species: H. sanguinis

Binomial name
- Haematomicrobium sanguinis (Mages et al. 2009) Schumann and Busse 2017

Type strain
- 741; CCUG 46407; DSM 21259

Synonyms
- Arthrobacter sanguinis Mages et al. 2009

Genus of bacteria

Haematomicrobium sanguinis is a species of bacteria from the family Micrococcaceae which has been isolated from human blood in Stockholm, Sweden.
