= Zhihengliuella =

Scientific classification
- Domain: Bacteria
- Kingdom: Bacillati
- Phylum: Actinomycetota
- Class: Actinomycetes
- Order: Micrococcales
- Family: Micrococcaceae
- Genus: Zhihengliuella; Zhang et al. 2007

Type species
- Zhihengliuella halotolerans Zhang et al. 2007

Species
- Z. aestuarii Baik et al. 2011; Z. alba Tang et al. 2009; Z. flava Hamada et al. 2013; Z. halotolerans Zhang et al. 2007; Z. salsuginis Chen et al. 2012; Z. somnathii Jha et al. 2015

Genus of bacteria

Zhihengliuella is a genus of gram-positive, mesophilic, aerobic non-spore-forming and motile bacteria from the family Micrococcaceae. Zhihengliuella is named after the Chinese microbiologist Zhi-Heng Liu.
