= 1-aminocyclopropane-1-carboxylate deaminase =

Class of enzymes

Identifiers
- EC no.: 3.5.99.7
- CAS no.: 69553-48-6

Databases
- BRENDA: enzyme data
- ExPASy: NiceZyme view
- KEGG: enzyme entry
- MetaCyc: metabolic pathway
- Rhea: reactions
- PDB structures: RCSB PDB PDBe PDBsum
- Gene Ontology: AmiGO / QuickGO
Search
- PMC: articles
- PubMed: articles
- NCBI: proteins

1-aminocyclopropane-1-carboxylate deaminase (EC 3.5.99.7) is an enzyme characterised from a Pseudomonas species and from Hansenula saturnus that catalyzes the hydrolysis of 1-aminocyclopropane-1-carboxylic acid to α-ketobutyric acid and ammonia:

1-aminocyclopropane-1-carboxylic acid
H_{2}O
NH_{3}
α-ketobutyric acid

The enzyme uses pyridoxal phosphate as a cofactor.. The normal role of 1-aminocyclopropane-1-carboxylic acid in plants is as a biochemical precursor to the hormone ethylene, so transgenic plants which have this enzyme introduced display slower ripening of their fruits. The reaction also has a role in plant response to environmental stress, such as increased salinity.

This enzyme is a hydrolase, one acting on carbon-nitrogen bonds other than peptide bonds. The systematic name of this enzyme class is 1-aminocyclopropane-1-carboxylate aminohydrolase (isomerizing). It is also called 1-aminocyclopropane-1-carboxylate endolyase (deaminating).

== Structural studies ==
As of late 2007, 6 structures have been solved for this class of enzymes, with PDB accession codes PDB: 1RQX, PDB: 1TYZ, PDB: 1TZ2, PDB: 1TZJ, PDB: 1TZK, and PDB: 1TZM.
