= Inulinase =

Identifiers
- EC no.: 3.2.1.7
- CAS no.: 9025-67-6

Databases
- IntEnz: IntEnz view
- BRENDA: BRENDA entry
- ExPASy: NiceZyme view
- KEGG: KEGG entry
- MetaCyc: metabolic pathway
- PRIAM: profile
- PDB structures: RCSB PDB PDBe PDBsum
Search
- PMC: articles
- PubMed: articles
- NCBI: proteins

Inulinase (EC 3.2.1.7 and EC 3.2.1.8, inulase, endoinulinase, endo-inulinase, exoinulinase, 2,1-β-D-fructan fructanohydrolase) is an enzyme with systematic name 1-β-D-fructan fructanohydrolase.

It catalyses the reaction:

Endohydrolysis of (2→1)-β-D-fructosidic linkages in inulin

Inulinase has 2 EC numbers of 3.2.1.7, and 3.2.1.8, for endo- and -exo inulinases, respectively. This classifies it as a hydrolase, specifically a glycosylase of glycosidic nature capable of hydrolyzing O- and S- glycosyl. Due to its chemical reactions, the food industry uses this enzyme to create high fructose syrup. It can be extracted from many tuber vegetables, such as Jerusalem artichoke, dahlia, and chicory.

== Reaction mechanism ==
The enzymatic reaction occurs between the inulinase and the inulin, with the assistance of water via hydrolysis. It's typically done within one step. The reaction centers around the breakage of a bond. The products result in fructose syrup and fructo-oligosaccharide. When these products undergo fermentation, additional products may be formed: lactic acid, bioethanol, citric acid, etc. The mechanisms involved may be considered highly efficient when compared to other enzymes.

== Inulinase Production ==
There are several places for inulinase to be found and produced. A common way is via plants, usually tubular root vegetables (Jerusalem artichoke, dahlia, chicory), where inulinase can be extracted. In this instance, fructose syrup is produced and used by the food industry.

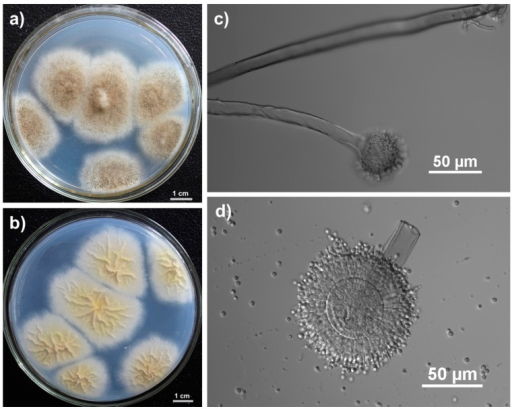
Aspergillus tubingensis, a fungus which can produce inulin and inulinase

Another way is extraction via bacteria (fungal endophyte, Kluyveromyces marxianus, Cryptococcus aureus). Marine bacteria, yeasts, and fungi are used commonly as well.

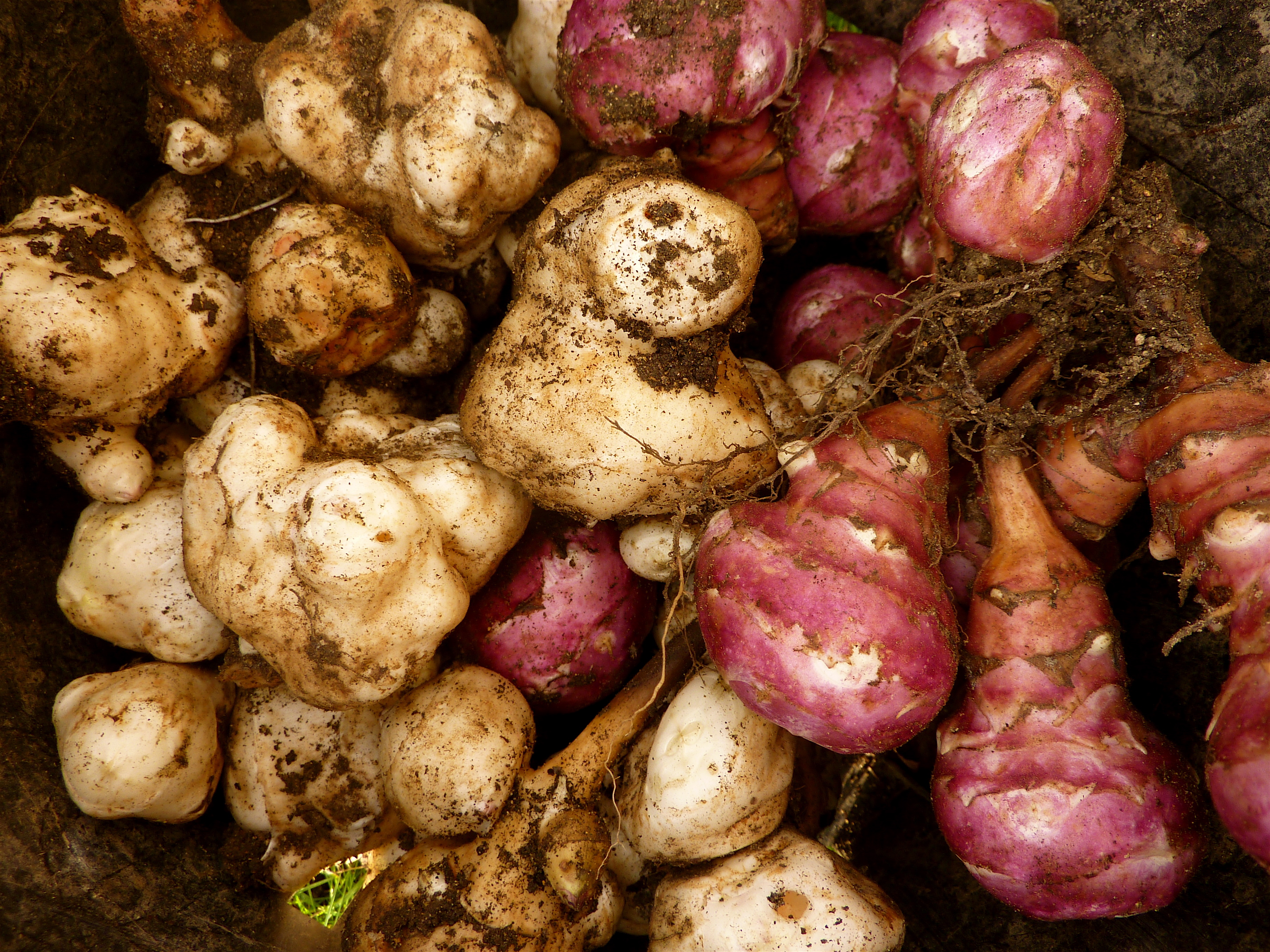
Jerusalem artichokes, native to North America

== Function ==
As a catalytic enzyme, either endo- or -exo inulinase destroys the bonds of one fructose attached to the inulin chain. Various affinities depending on the environment will affect how the inulinase interacts with the inulin. It functions efficiently between 40-80 degrees Celsius, although depending on the source of the enzyme, it can go as low as 30 degrees Celsius and still work well.

In regards to being tied into a larger metabolism, it helps break down inulin. When people consume inulin (a soluble fiber), the inulinase breaks down the inulin and it goes through fermentation.

== Structure ==
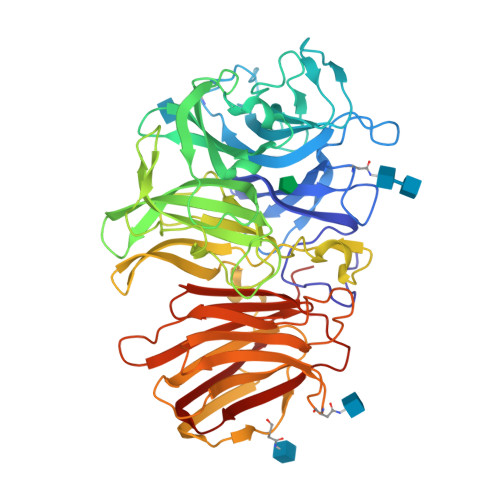
Crystal structure of hydrolase exo-inulinase from Aspergillus awamori

Inulinase contains a N-terminal domain of glycosyl hydrolase family 32 which forms a five bladed beta propeller structure and C terminal domain of glycosyl hydrolase family 32. It forms a beta sandwich module.

The crystal structures are shown here on either side of the page. The two structures of endo-inulinase and exo-inulinase are mainly made of beta-sheets, with the exception of the endo-inulinase, which has one alpha helix. Being made of beta sheets allows the structures to be more stable during chemical reactions.

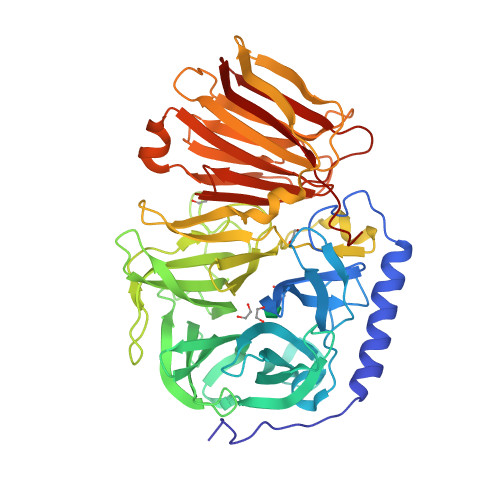
Crystal structure of hydrolase endo-inulinase from Bifidobacterium adolescentis expressed in Escherichia coli

== Active and regulatory sites ==
Both of the inulinases have different active sites, with exo-inulinase having a funnel shape whereas endo-inulinase has a pocket shape. They're complicated due to the amino acids needing to be a balance of catalytic and conserved to achieve a stable enzymatic active site. According to the most recent reference, three amino acids (serine, aspartic acid, and glutamic acid) bind via a hydrogen bond to the fructose molecule that attaches to the exo-inulinase. Whereas with three other amino acids (glutamic acid, tryptophan, and asparagine) those bind via a hydrogen bond to the ketose molecule that attaches to the endo-inulinase.

The structure of the enzymes may or may not influence their function. Each version of the enzyme has about 518 amino acids within its sequence. Due to the differences expressed in endo- and exo- inulinases, it will need to be proven or disproven the structure of these enzymes is the reason for the functionality of inulinase.
