= Micrococcaceae =

Scientific classification
- Domain: Bacteria
- Kingdom: Bacillati
- Phylum: Actinomycetota
- Class: Actinomycetes
- Order: Micrococcales
- Family: Micrococcaceae; Pribram 1929 (Approved Lists 1980)

Type genus
- Micrococcus Cohn 1872 (Approved Lists 1980)

Genera
- See text.

Synonyms
- Yaniellaceae Li et al. 2008; Yaniaceae Li et al. 2005

Family of bacteria

Micrococcaceae, from Ancient Greek μικρός (mikrós), meaning "small", and κόκκος (kókkos), meaning "sphere", includes bacterial genera of Gram positive cocci that inhabit the air and skin, such as Micrococcus luteus.

== Genera ==
The family Micrococcaceae comprises the following genera:

- Acaricomes Pukall et al. 2006
- Arthrobacter Conn and Dimmick 1947 (Approved Lists 1980)
- Auritidibacter Yassin et al. 2011
- Citricoccus Altenburger et al. 2002
- Enteractinococcus Cao et al. 2012
- Falsarthrobacter Busse and Moore 2018
- Galactobacter Hahne et al. 2019
- Garicola Lo et al. 2015
- Glutamicibacter Busse 2016
- Haematomicrobium Schumann and Busse 2017
- Kocuria Stackebrandt et al. 1995
- Micrococcoides Tóth et al. 2017
- Micrococcus Cohn 1872 (Approved Lists 1980)
- Neomicrococcus Prakash et al. 2015
- Nesterenkonia Stackebrandt et al. 1995
- Paenarthrobacter Busse 2016
- Paeniglutamicibacter Busse 2016
- Pseudarthrobacter Busse 2016
- Pseudoglutamicibacter Busse 2016
- Psychromicrobium Schumann et al. 2017
- Renibacterium Sanders and Fryer 1980
- Rothia Georg and Brown 1967 (Approved Lists 1980)
- Sinomonas Zhou et al. 2009
- Specibacter Lee and Schumann 2019
- Tersicoccus Vaishampayan et al. 2013
- Yaniella Li et al. 2008
- Zafaria Amin et al. 2021
- Zhihengliuella Zhang et al. 2007

== Phylogeny ==
The currently accepted taxonomy is based on the List of Prokaryotic names with Standing in Nomenclature and the phylogeny is based on whole-genome sequences. (Note: Auritidibacter, Citricoccus, Enteractinococcus, Falsarthrobacter, Galactobacter, Garicola, Micrococcoides, Neomicrococcus, Pseudoglutamicibacter, Psychromicrobium, Specibacter, and Zhihengliuella are not included in this phylogenetic tree.)

- - Micrococcaceae
    - - Nesterenkonia
      - - Yaniella
        - Micrococcus
    - - - Rothia
        - Kocuria
      - - - Paeniglutamicibacter
          - Glutamicibacter
        - - Haematomicrobium
          - - Tersicoccus
            - - - Acaricomes
                - Renibacterium
              - - Sinomonas
                - - Paenarthrobacter
                  - - Arthrobacter
                    - Pseudarthrobacter
  - outgroup
    Brevibacteriaceae
