= Lugus =

Celtic deity

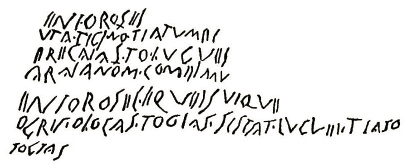
The long dedication to Lugus from Peñalba de Villastar

Lugus (sometimes Lugos or Lug) is a Celtic god whose worship is attested in the epigraphic record. No depictions of the god are known. Lugus perhaps also appears in Roman sources and medieval Insular mythology.

Various dedications, concentrated in Iberia and dated to between the 1st century BCE and the 3rd century CE, attest to the worship of the god Lugus. However, these predominately describe the god in the plural, as the Lugoves. The nature of these deities, and their relationship to Lugus, has been much debated. Only one, early inscription from Peñalba de Villastar, Spain is widely agreed to attest to Lugus as a singular entity. The god Lugus has also been cited in the etymologies of several Celtic personal and place-names incorporating the element "Lug(u)-" (for example, that of the prominent Roman settlement Lugdunum).

Julius Caesar's description in his Commentaries on the Gallic War of an important pre-Roman Gaulish god (whom Caesar identified with the Roman god Mercury) has been interpreted as a reference to the god Lugus. Caesar's description of Gaulish Mercury has been examined against Insular sources, as well as the prominence of "Lug(u)-" elements in Gaulish place-names. A prominent cult to Mercury in Roman Gaul provides limited evidence for this identification.

Lugus has also been connected with two figures from medieval Insular mythology. In Irish mythology, Lugh is an important and supernatural figure. His description as a skilled artisan and founder of a harvest festival has been compared with Gaulish Mercury. In Welsh mythology, Lleu Llaw Gyffes, a protagonist of the Fourth Branch of the Mabinogi, is a more minor figure, but is linked etymologically with Irish Lugh. He perhaps shares with the Lugoves an association with shoemaking.

The reconstruction of a pan-Celtic god Lugus from these details, first proposed in the 19th century by Henri d'Arbois de Jubainville, has proven controversial. Criticism of this theory by Celticists such as Bernhard Maier has caused aspects of the reconstruction (such as a pan-Celtic festival of Lugus on 1 August) to be abandoned, however others still defend the existence of the pan-Celtic Lugus.

== Etymology ==
The etymology of Lugus's name has been the subject of repeated conjecture, but no single etymology has gained wide acceptance.

The most commonly repeated etymology derives the name from proto-Indo-European *leuk- ("to shine"). This etymology is closely tied to proposals to identify Lugus as a solar god. However, Garrett Olmsted has pointed out that this derivation poses phonological difficulties. Proto-Celtic *lug- cannot develop from proto-Indo-European *leuk-, according to the known sound changes between the two languages. Carlos Jordán Cólera has noted that this root would result in Irish **Luch, rather than the attested Irish Lugh.

Heinrich Wagner and Erich Hamp have proposed that the name derives from a proto-Celtic word meaning "oath" (either *lugiom or *leugh-). John T. Koch has taken this hypothesis up, and proposed that the early Irish oath tongu do dia toinges mo thúath is a suppressed oath to Lugus. A. G. van Hamel and Maier proposed a derivation from supposed proto-Celtic *lugus ("lynx"), perhaps used allusively to mean "warrior", but an article by John Carey found the evidence for the existence of such a word in proto-Celtic lacking. Minority etymologies derive "Lugus" from the name of the Norse god Loki, proto-Celtic *luc- ("mouse" or "rat"), and supposed Gaulish lougos ("raven").

== Linguistic evidence ==
=== Epigraphy ===
Text	Image	Context	Language	Citation	Comments
LUGOVIBUS / SACRUM / L(UCIUS) L(ICINIUS?) URCI/CO(M) COLLE/GIO SUTORU/M D(ONUM) D(EDIT)		Inscribed on an altar. Found in the Roman city of Uxama Argaela, near Osma, Soria, Spain.	Latin	CIL II, 2818	Translated, the inscription reads "Consecrated to the Lugoves. Lucius L(icinius?), of the Urcici donated it on behalf of the College of Shoemakers". Connected to a trait of Welsh Lleu, discussed below.
DIBUS M(AGNIS ?) / LUCOBO(S) AVE(or NE) / T?ORIA AVITA / E? / CON EX VISU / CONSULENTIB(US) (Note: This reading follows Jürgen Untermann. A large number of other readings have been given, collected in an article by Ana María Vázquez Hoys.)		Inscribed on a stele. Found in Peña Amaya, Burgos, Spain.	Latin	CIL II, 6338v	This poorly preserved inscription has been interpreted by Jürgen Untermann as a dedication to the Lugoves made, as a result of a vision, by a person with the cognomen Avita. Above the inscription is an ithyphallic figure with his arms outstretched (in orant position).
LUGUBO / ARQUIENOB(O) / C(AIUS) IULIUS / HISPANUS / V(OTUM) S(OLVIT) L(IBENS) M(ERITO)		Inscribed on an altar. Found in the church of San Martín de Liñarán in Sober, Lugo, Spain.	Latin	IRPL 67	Translated, the inscription reads "To the Luguves Arquieni, with all merit. Caius Iulius Hispanus in fulfilment of a vow".
SACRUM / LUCOUBU / ARQUIENI(S) / SILONIU(S) / SILO / EX VOTO		Inscribed on an altar. From the town of Sinoga in Rábade, Lugo, Spain.	Latin	IRPL 68	Translated, the inscription reads "Dedicated to the Lucouves Arquieni. Silonius Silo in fulfilment of a vow".
LUCOBO / AROUSA(BO?) / V(OTUM) S(OLVIT) L(IBENS) M(ERITO) / RUTIL[IA] / ANTIANIA		Inscribed on an altar. Found in a 2nd-century CE religious building in the city of Lugo, Spain.	Latin	AE 2003, 00951	Translated, the inscription reads "To the Lucoves Arousae, with all merit, Rutilia Antiania, in willing fulfilment of her vow".
LUC(OBO) GUD/ AROVIS? / VALE[RIUS?] / CLEM[ENS?] / V(OTUM) L(IBENTER) S(OLVIT)		Inscribed on an altar. Found in a 2nd-century CE religious building in the city of Lugo, Spain.	Latin	AE 2003, 00952	Translated, the inscription reads "To the Lucoves Gudarovi(?), Valerius (?) Clemens (?) in willing fulfilment of his vow".
[LUCU]BU / ARQ(U)IE / NIS [---] / IULIU(S) [---] V(OTUM) S(OLVIT)		Inscribed on an altar. Found in San Vicente de Castillón, Lugo, Spain.	Latin	BRAH 1971 185.	Translated, the inscription reads "To the Lucuves Arquieni(...) Iulius (...) in fulfilment of a vow".
RUFINA / LUCUBUS / V(OTUM) S(OLVIT) L(IBENS) M(ERITO)		Inscribed on a stele. Found in Nemausus (Roman Nîmes), Gard, France.	Latin	CIL XII, 3080	
LUGOVES		Inscribed on a Corinthian capital. Found in the Roman city of Aventicum, near Avenches, Vaud, Switzerland.	Latin	CIL XIII, 5078	Karl Zangemeister suggested that the inscription referred to the figure originally set on the capital.
ΛΟΥΓΟΥϹ (translit.: lougous)		Inscribed on a ceramic dish. Found in the Oppidum de l'Ermitage, in Alès, Gard, France.	Gaulish	RIG I G-159	The inscription is probably an ownership mark, so at most records a theophoric personal name.
[...] bissiet lugedessummiiis luge / dessumíis lugedessumiis luxe		Inscribed on a lead tablet. Found in Chamalières, Puy-de-Dome, France.	Gaulish	RIG II.2 L-100	At the end of the Chamalières tablet inscription, luge dessumiis is repeated three times. This feature is very difficult to interpret, but Karl-Horst Schmidt has interpreted it as an incantation of Lugus (in the singular). This interpretation has not been widely accepted.
ENIOROSEI / VTA.TIGINO.TIATVMEI / TRECAIAS.TOLVGVEI / ARAIANOM.COMEIMV / ENIOROSEI.EQVOISVIQVE / OGRIS.OIOCAS.TO.GIAS.SISTAT.LVGVEI.TIASO / TOGIAS (Note: There are several readings of this inscription, but this reading follows Untermann, who gives the following variants: LVGVES for LVGVEI and OLOCAS for OIOCAS.)		Inscribed on a rock. Found at the site of Peñalba de Villastar, in Villastar, Aragon, Spain.	Celtiberian	MLH IV K.3.3	This inscription, which dates to the 1st century BCE and is among the longest found in the Celtic sanctuary of Peñalba de Villastar, is very obscure in its meaning. No definite translation of this text has been established, but the majority of scholars hold that to luguei is to be interpreted as a dedication to Lugus (in the dative singular). (Note: Not all agree with this interpretation. Carlos Jordán Cólera interpreted luguei as "through an oath". Patrizia de Bernardo Stempel has argued against Jordán Cólera's hypothesis. Untermann's suggested alternate reading, lugues, would give the name in the nominative plural, but (as Francisco Marco Simón points out) this is at odds with word to before it, which appears to be in the dative.)
l.o.C(o).o.P(o).n.i.i.a.r.a.P(o).o [...] (Note: This article only give the transliteration of this inscription, which is written in the Southwest Paleohispanic script. The reading given here follows José A. Correa. Untermann gives a different reading.)		Inscribed on a stele. Found in the Roman necropolis of Fonte Velha, in Bensafrim, Lagos, Portugal.	Tartessian	MLH IV J.1.1	The beginning of this inscription has been interpreted by José A. Correa as referring to Lugus in the dative plural (Locobo Niirabo). Jürgen Zeidler has expressed scepticism about this reading.

A number of dedications to Lugus, dating between the 1st century BCE and 3rd century CE, have been found in Continental Europe. This epigraphic data is concentrated in Iberia; only a small number of inscriptions are known from Gaul, and none are known from Britain or Ireland. A peculiarity of this data is that the singular of Lugus's name is rarely recorded. There is consensus that a Celtiberian inscription from Peñalba de Villastar features the singular. A minority interpret the Gaulish-language Chamalières tablet as invoking singular Lugus. The singular is inscribed on a ceramic sherd from Oppidum de l'Ermitage, but this is probably a theophoric name and not a reference to the god Lugus. Many Celtic gods are referenced both in the plural and the singular, (Note: Arbois de Jubainville was aware of this and compared Lugus/Lugoves to the pairs Deo Vitiri/Dibus Vitiribus and Deo Mounti/Dis Mountibus known from Roman Britain. Joshua Whatmough points out that this feature is common to Gaul as well, where plural dedications to Mercury, Epona, and Silvanus are known.) but in dedications to Lugus the plural form ("Lugoves" or "Lucoves" (Note: Garrett Olmsted explains the form "Lucoves" as a result of "the tendency to confuse the voiced and unvoiced series, particularly c and g, [...] most frequent in Spain and Aquitania".)) predominates.

The nature of the Lugoves, and their relationship to Lugus, has been much debated. The epigraphic record is equivocal as to the gender of these deities. The epithet Arquienob(o) (attested at San Martín de Liñarán) has masculine gender, whereas the epithets Arousa(bo) (attested on an altar from Lugo) and possibly Niirabo indicate the feminine. Henri Gaidoz contended that plural deities were minor in the Celtic pantheon, and that therefore Lugus could not have been the chief god of the Celts. Arbois de Jubainville and Joseph Vendryes argued that the Celts invoked even major gods (such as Mars) in the plural. Some scholars have tried to explain the multiplicity of the Lugoves through traits of Irish Lugh or Welsh Lleu. Marie-Louise Sjoestedt, for example, pointed out that Lugh was one of triplets. Maier has argued that the obscurity of the nature of the Lugoves limits the value of the epigraphic record as evidence for pan-Celtic Lugus. Krista Ovist argues against this point.

=== Proper names ===
The element "lug(u)-" appears frequently in Celtic proper names. In many of these cases, an etymology involving the deity-name Lugus has been proposed. Celtic personal names with this element include Lug, Lugaunus, Lugugenicus, Lugotorix, Luguadicos, Luguselva, and Lougous. A number of cognate names are known from Irish Ogham inscriptions, for example, Luga, Lugudecca (perhaps, "serving the god Lugus"), Luguqritt (perhaps, "poet like Lugus"), and Luguvvecca. Some ethnic names have been connected with Lugus, for example the Lugi in Scotland and the Lugones in Asturias. Place-names connected with Lugus include Lugii, Lougoi, Lougionon, Lugisonis, and Lugnesses. Lucus Augusti (1st century BC, modern-day Lugo) is the site of a Roman sanctuary with dedications to the Lugoves; its name may be derived from "Lugus", or may simply derive from the Latin for "sacred grove of Augustus". The name of Luguvalium (modern-day Carlisle) is sometimes glossed as "wall of Lugus", but may instead derive from a personal name.

Lugdunum (modern-day Lyon) at the heart of Roman Gaul

Since Arbois de Jubainville argued for the connection, the place-name "Lugdunum" has frequently been connected etymologically with Lugus. The most famous known by this name is Lugdunum (modern-day Lyon) in the region of Gallia Lugdunensis, (Note: The Roman province, which stretched from Saône to Brittany, took its name from the city.) a Roman colony and among the most important cities of Roman Gaul. The etymology of this place-name has been the subject of much conjecture. Following Arbois de Jubainville, the most widely held hypothesis analyses the name as Lugus + dunum ("fort"), (Note: Gaulish dunun or dunum has the meaning "'citadel, fortified enclosure, mount".) that is, "the fortress of Lugus". Many other etymologies have been given. One ancient etymology derives it from a supposed Gaulish word lougos, meaning raven. (Note: This etymology is reported in the 2nd-century text De fluviis, given as part of a founding legend of Lugdunum/Lyon: two founders with Gaulish names observe ravens over a hill, and decide to found a city there, deriving its name from lougos ("raven") + dunun ("hill"). The gloss of dunun is correct, but the supposed Gaulish word lougos is a hapax legomenon and has no clear cognates in other Celtic languages, though Zeidler has proposed a derivation from proto-Indo-European.) Attempts have been made to analyse the name as *lugus ("luminous" or "clear") + dunum ("hill"), bolstered by a medieval etymology which gives the gloss mons lucidus ("shining mountain").

The place-name Lugdunum is attested, in its cognate forms, as the name of as many as twenty-seven locations. (Note: Christian-Joseph Guyonvarc'h lists 27 places connected with this name. He classifies 20 as certain, 5 as probable, and 2 as doubtful. Alfred Holder gives a shorter list of 16 in his Alt-celtischer Sprachschatz.) Apart from Lyon, there is Lugdunum Convenarum (modern-day Saint-Bertrand-de-Comminges), Lugdunum Batavorum (near Leyden), Lugdunum Remorum (modern-day Laon), two Welsh places named Din Lleu (the order of the elements reversed), and two cities of unclear location in North East England and Germania Magna. The wide range and abundance of these place-names has been used to argue for the importance of Lugus. However, Maier argues that even if the etymology for "Lugdunum" invoking Lugus is correct, not all of these place-names must owe themselves to the Celtic god. Lugdunum/Lyon was a major city, and other locations may have borrowed the name. Some two-thirds of the cognate place-names are attested only from the 10th century on; we know that Lugdunum Remorum had an older, native name ("Bibrax") which was displaced in the 6th century.

== Caesar and Gaulish Mercury ==
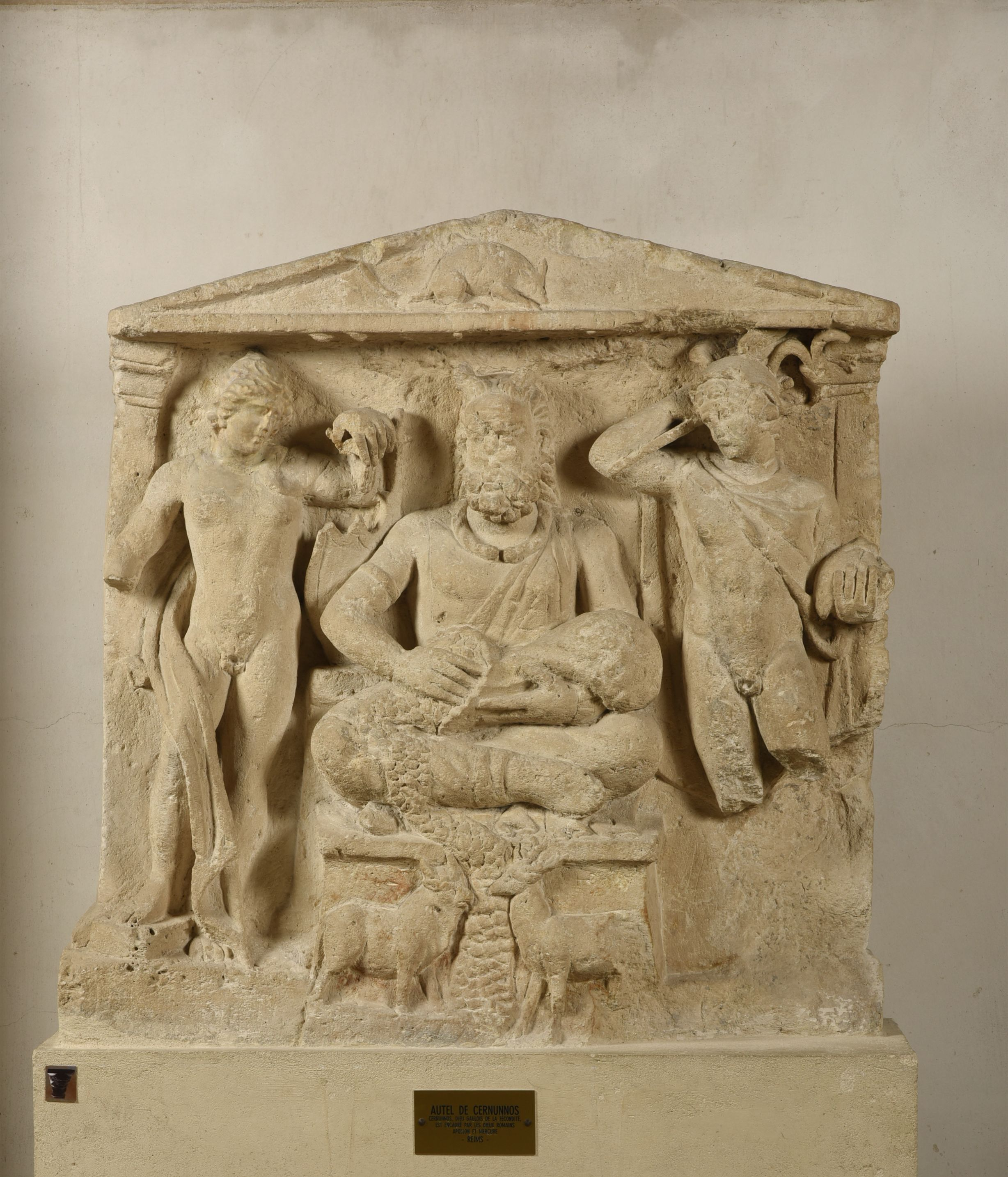
Altar from Reims to Apollo, Cernunnos, and Mercury

Commentaries on the Gallic War is Julius Caesar's first-hand account of the Gallic Wars (58 to 50 BCE). In giving an account of the customs of the Gauls, Caesar wrote the following:

Deum maxime Mercurium colunt. Huius sunt plurima simulacra: hunc omnium inventorem artium ferunt, hunc viarum atque itinerum ducem, hunc ad quaestus pecuniae mercaturasque habere vim maximam arbitrantur. Post hunc Apollinem et Martem et Iovem et Minervam. De his eandem fere, quam reliquae gentes, habent opinionem.

The god they reverence most is Mercury. They have many images of him, and they regard him as the inventor of all arts, the god who directs men on their journeys, and the most powerful helper in trading and getting money. Next to him they reverence Apollo, Mars, Jupiter, and Minerva, about whom they have much the same ideas as other nations.

Caesar here employs the device of interpretatio romana, in which foreign gods are equated with those of the Roman pantheon. (Note: The equation of a Roman god with a foreign god was made on the basis of their perceived similarity, but, in practice, a clear equivalent was often absent, so one common trait or sphere of activity sufficed to justify the equivalence.) With very few exceptions, Roman writings about Celtic and Germanic religion employ interpretatio romana, but the equations they made varied from writer to writer. This makes identifying the native gods behind the Roman names very difficult. Indeed, if their information was confused or their intention was propagandistic, reconstruction of native religion is next to impossible.

Caesar contrasts Gaulish Mercury with the other gods of the Gauls, insofar as he is the god about whom they do not have "much the same ideas" as the Romans. The Romans associated Mercury with trading and travel, but they did not think of him as "inventor of all arts". Another difference is suggested by the order in which the gods are presented: Mercury is given primacy, whereas the Romans considered Jupiter the most important deity. Moreover, Mercury's role as guide of souls to the underworld (an important aspect of the god for the Romans) goes unmentioned in this passage. Caesar elsewhere ascribes to the Gauls a belief in metempsychosis, which may have precluded Gaulish Mercury from this function. (Note: Indeed, Gerhard Bauchhenss has pointed out that depictions of Mercury are very rare on Gallo-Roman tombs, suggesting that this aspect of Mercury was never assimilated into Gaulish religion.)

The first Celtic god to be identified as Caesar's Gaulish Mercury was Teutates. (Note: Mercury is identified with Teutates by several medieval commentators on the Roman poet Lucan's epic Pharsalia (wherein Teutates is mentioned by name). However, in epigraphy Teutates is equated with the Roman god Mars rather than Mercury. Elias Schedius identified Teutates with Gaulish Mercury in 1648, and this identification was repeated through most of the 18th and 19th centuries. In more recent times, this identification has received the support of Jean-Louis Brunaux.) This identification was widely accepted until the late 19th century, when Arbois de Jubainville proposed that Lugus lay behind Caesar's description. Arbois de Jubainville pointed to the prominence of "Lug(u)-" elements in Gaulish place-names, and a possible festival of Lugus at Lugdunum/Lyon (discussed below). He also drew comparison between Irish Lugh's epithet Samildánach ("master of all arts") and Caesar's description of Gaulish Mercury as "inventor of all arts". Maier has criticised this identification on the basis that "inventor of all arts", though not a Greco-Roman belief about the god Mercury, is a common literary topos in Roman descriptions of foreign religions. He also casts doubt on the possibility that an epithet like this, not otherwise attested in the epigraphic record, could have survived into medieval Irish literature.

A confusing aspect of Caesar's description of this cult is his reference to the "many images" of Gaulish Mercury; specifically he uses the word simulacra, a word which had the connotation of worshipped idols for Roman authors. Archaeological evidence of anthropomorphic cult images is scant before the Roman conquest of Gaul. The testimony of some Roman authors suggests the Gauls did not produce images of their gods, though Lucan describes the Gauls as having wooden idols. Salomon Reinach suggested that Caesar meant to draw a comparison between aniconic monuments to Gaulish Mercury and the herms (aniconic monuments to Hermes, Mercury's Greek equivalent) he knew from Rome, but this is an unlikely use of the word simulacra.

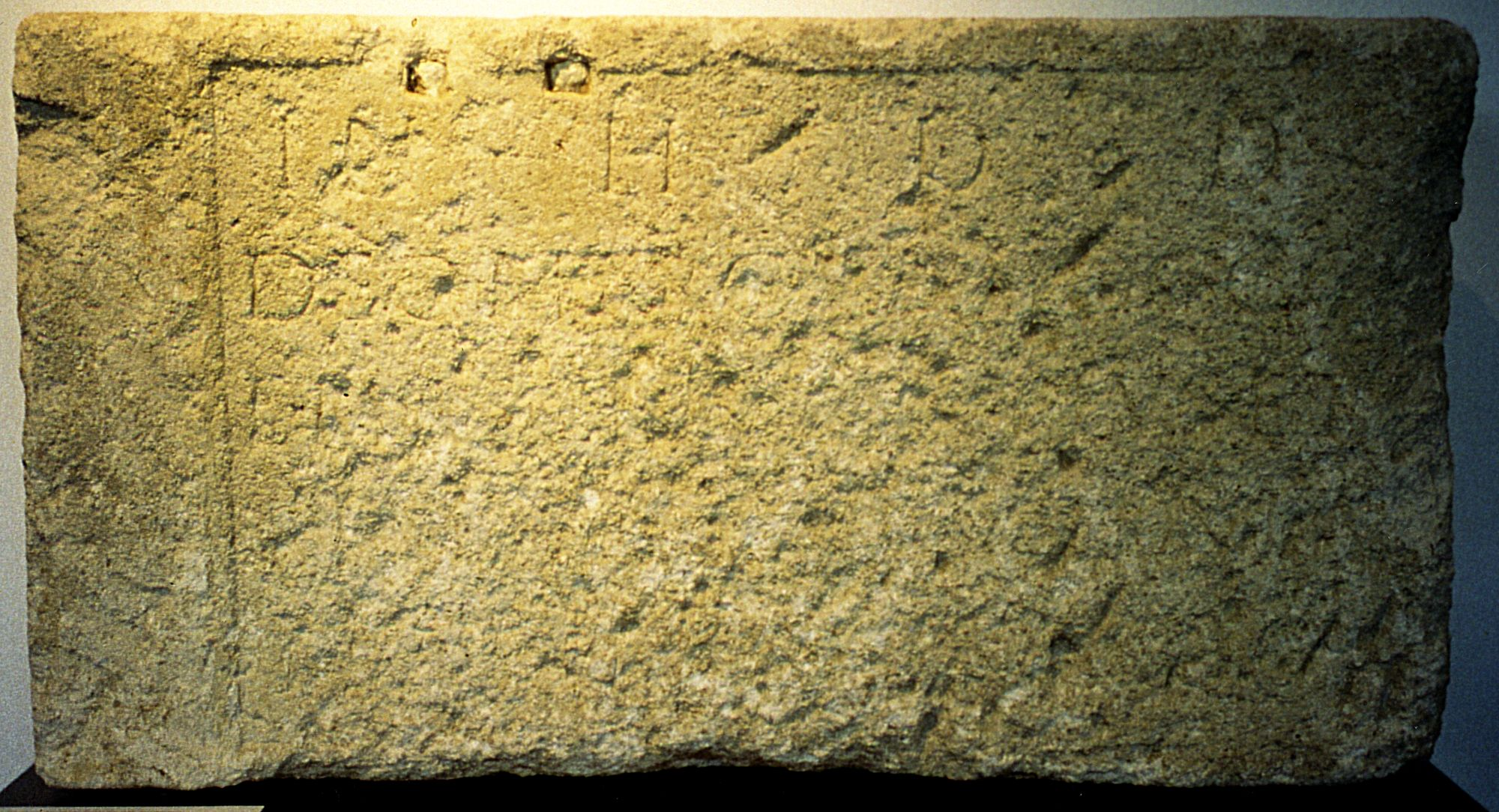
Inscription from Langres deo Mercur(io) Mocco ("to Mercury of the Swine")

Certainly, after Caesar's conquest of Gaul, depiction and worship of Mercury was widespread. (Note: Paul-Marie Duval estimated that two-thirds of all monuments in the Roman world dedicated to Mercury have been found in Gaul.) More images of Mercury have been found in Roman Gaul than those of any other God, but these representations of Mercury are conventional, and show no discernible Celtic influence. Epigraphic material does reveal some bynames of Mercury peculiar to Gaul, thought to be suggestive of native gods. An inscription from Langres attests to a Mercur(io) Mocco ("Mercury of the Swine"), perhaps Lugus. Other epithets—connecting Mercury with heights, particular Gaulish tribes, and the emperor Augustus—have been thought to be suggestive of Lugus. The epigraphic record has not produced any epithets portraying Mercury as inventor or master of arts.

== Depictions ==
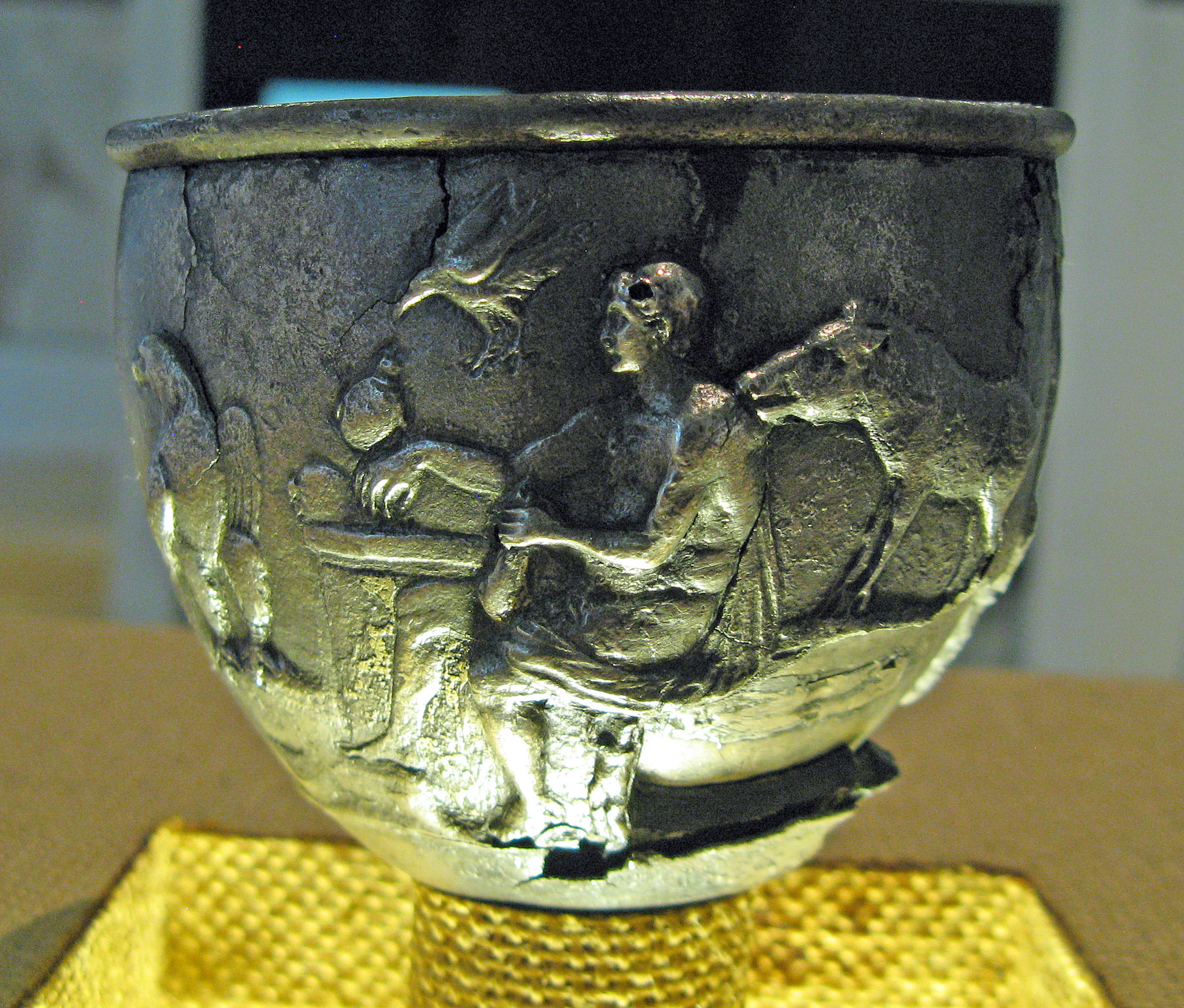
The Lyon cup

No images of Lugus are known. However, a number of figures have been proposed to represent Lugus. A Gallo-Roman silver cup from Lyon is decorated with a number of figures, including a human counting money next to a raven. Pierre Wuilleumier identified the human figure as Mercury/Lugus, whereas Jean-Jacques Hatt identified the raven as Apollo/Lugus. Paula Powers Coe argued that the depiction of Mercury on an altar from Reims could be Lugus, as a rat (Gaulish lucot) is depicted above Mercury, perhaps punning on Lugus's native name. Arguing from an association between Irish Lugh and pigs, Gwenaël Le Duc has proposed that the Euffigneix statue (of a Gaulish boar-god) is a representation of Lugus.

== Later mythology ==
=== Lugh in Irish mythology ===
Lugh Lamfhota (literally, "Long-armed Lugh") is an Irish mythological figure of the Mythological Cycle and the Ulster Cycle. He is portrayed as a leading member of the Tuatha Dé Danann, a supernatural race in medieval Irish literature often thought to represent euhemerized pre-Christian deities. Alongside Fionn mac Cumhaill and Cú Chulainn (Lugh's supernatural son), he is one of the three great heroes of the Irish mythological tradition. The Irish celebrated Lughnasa, a harvest festival which fell on 1 August and which, according to Irish tradition, was established by Lugh in honour of his foster mother.

Arbois de Jubainville made the connection between Lugh and Lugus. Beyond the similarity in names, he adduced two connections between Irish Lugh and Celtic Lugus. Firstly, he drew attention to the (above discussed) correspondence between Lugh's epithet Samildánach ("master of all arts") and Caesar's description of Gaulish Mercury. Secondly, he pointed out that an annual concillium of the Gauls in Lugdunum/Lyon, instituted in 12 BCE in honour of the emperor Augustus, fell on exactly the same day as Lughnasa. He suggested that both must ultimately derive from a Celtic festival in honour of Lugus. Recent scholarship has tended to dismiss this as a coincidence. There are a number of reasons 1 August may have been chosen for a festival in honour of Augustus: it was the calends of the month which bore his name and the anniversary of his political victory over Antony and Cleopatra. Maier has pointed out that evidence exists showing Continental Celts used a lunar calendar, or a lunisolar calendar whereas evidence for an Irish solar calendar also exists, so continuity of a seasonal festival would be unlikely throughout the Celtic world.

=== Lleu in Welsh mythology ===
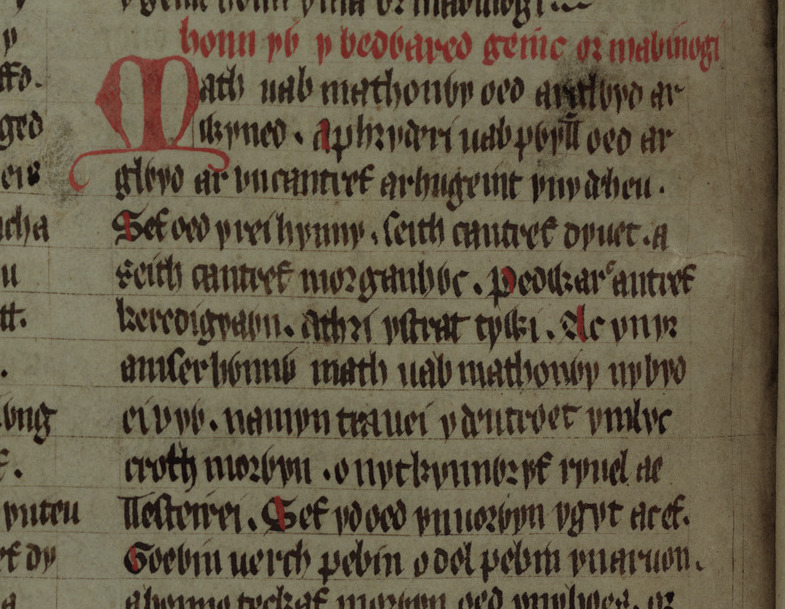
The opening lines of the Fourth Branch of the Mabinogi

Lleu Llaw Gyffes (literally, "Lleu of the Skillful Hand" or "Steady Hand") is one of the protagonists of the Fourth Branch of the Mabinogi, a set of Welsh stories compiled in the 12th-13th centuries. He is a prince whose story culminates in him becoming ruler of Gwynedd. Though not depicted as other than human, Lleu is depicted with extraordinary or magical skills, like many other characters in Welsh mythology. Lleu (or characters similar to him) appears in other works of medieval Welsh literature. Notable examples are Lluch Llavynnauc (Lluch "of the Striking Hand" or Lluch "Equipped with a Blade") in Pa gur; Lluch Lleawc (Lluch "the Death Dealing") in Preiddeu Annwn; and Llwch Llawwynnyawe (Lluch "of the Striking Hand") in Culhwch.

John Rhys was the first to relate Lleu to Lugus, which he did in 1888. Rhys drew a comparison between an episode in the Mabinogi, wherein Lleu and his foster father Gwydion produce gold-ornamented shoes, and the inscription from Uxama Argaela, where the Lugoves are invoked by a group of shoemakers. This parallel has received a mixed reception. Joseph Loth felt that the episode was minor and the conclusion extravagant. Jan de Vries concurred with Rhys, and further hypothesised that the "Lugoves" in this inscription were Lleu and Gwydion.

=== Lugus, Lugh, and Lleu ===
Though the stories told of Lleu and Lugh do not show many similarities, comparisons have been drawn between epithets of Lleu and Lugh: Lleu is Llaw Gyffes ("of the Skillful Hand") and Lugh is Samildánach ("master of all arts"); Lleu is Llawwynnyawe ("of the Striking Hand") and Lugh is Lonnbémnach ("of the Fierce Blows"). Ronald Hutton points out that medieval Welsh and Irish literature are known to have borrowed superficially from each other (for example, the similar in name but dissimilar in character Welsh Manawydan fab Llŷr and Irish Manannán mac Lir). This would suffice to explain the common epithets.

Welsh Lleu and Irish Lugh are both linguistically correct as reflexes of a Gaulish or Brittonic name Lugus. Hutton notes that a medieval borrowing cannot explain the linguistic relationship between Lugh and Lleu. For the names to be cognate, their common origin must be prior to the respective sound changes in Irish and in Welsh. Jessica Hemming argues that, insofar as Lugus is entirely absent from the epigraphic record in Britain and Ireland, the etymology is questionable.

== Reconstruction ==
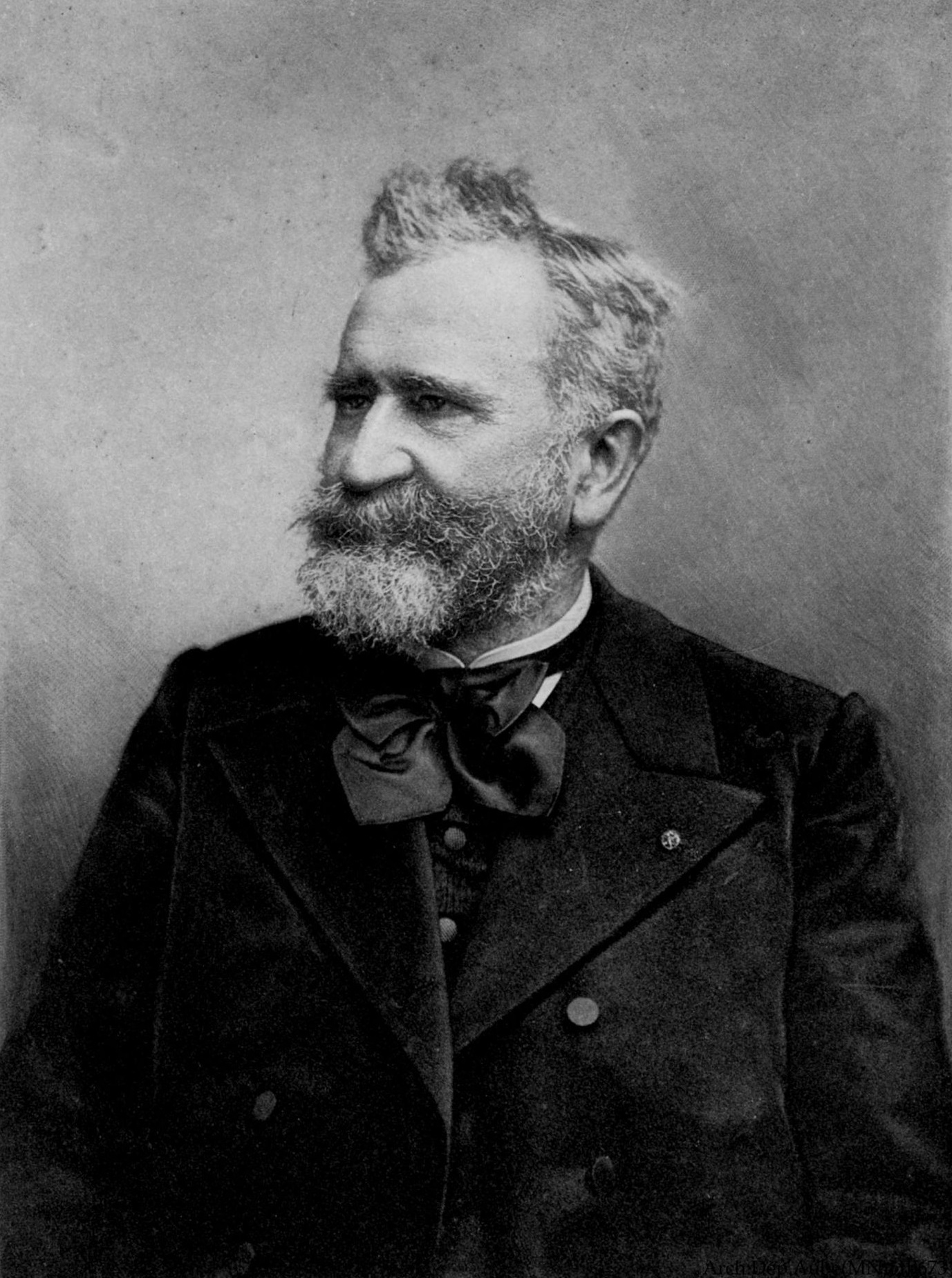
Henri d'Arbois de Jubainville

The god Lugus was first hypothesised by Arbois de Jubainville in his monumental Le cycle mythologique irlandais et la mythologie celtique (1884). Arbois de Jubainville linked together Irish Lugh, Caesar's Gaulish Mercury, the toponym Lugdunum, and the epigraphic evidence of the Lugoves. By 1888, Sir John Rhys had linked Lugus with Welsh Lleu. Though the hypothesis of the existence of a god Lugus had some early critics in Henri Gaidoz and Camille Jullian, it quickly caught on, and was by-and-large uncritically accepted by later writers on Celtic religion. As early as 1912, Jullian complained of the "incredible vogue" which Arbois de Jubainville's theory enjoyed. Over the 20th century, the theory mainly saw further elaboration. The long inscription from Peñalba de Villastar was first published in 1942 and, by the 1950s it had been identified as a unique dedication to Lugus in the singular. In a 1982 article, Antonio Tovar cited Lugus as an exemplar of the unity of ancient Celtic culture. Few other Celtic gods could be said to be attested in Gaulish, Insular, and Iberian sources.

Early doubts about Lugus were raised by Pierre Flobert (in 1965) and Stephanie Boucher (in 1983). However, scepticism about the god only entered the mainstream in the 1990s, coinciding with a wave of scepticism about the unity of the ancient Celts. The most important of these critiques was mounted by Bernhard Maier, in his 1996 article "Is Lug to be Identified with Mercury?". As well as criticising the identification of Caesar's Gaulish Mercury with Irish Lugh, Maier cast doubt on the value of the previously adduced epigraphic and toponymic data from Continental Europe. As Ovist put it, Maier "in effect, question[ed] the very existence of Continental Lugus".

Scepticism about the existence of Lugus has not become consensus. Recent monographs on the god by Krista Ovist (2004) and Gaël Hily (2012) have reaffirmed and elaborated on Arbois de Jubainville's reconstruction. The strength of the epigraphic and toponymic evidence has been marshalled in defense of the hypothesis by scholars such as Ovist and Zeidler.
