= Hispano-Celtic languages =

Extinct Celtic languages of Iberia

Hispano-Celtic
- Geographic distribution: Iberian Peninsula
- Linguistic classification: Indo-European: Celtic; Continental Celtic; Hispano-Celtic
- Subdivisions: Celtiberian †; Gallaecian †

Language codes

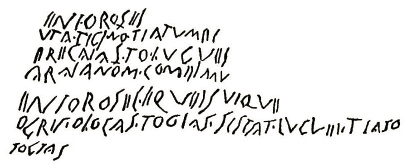
The Celtiberian Peñalba de Villastar rock inscription says "...TO LVGVEI ARAIANOM...".

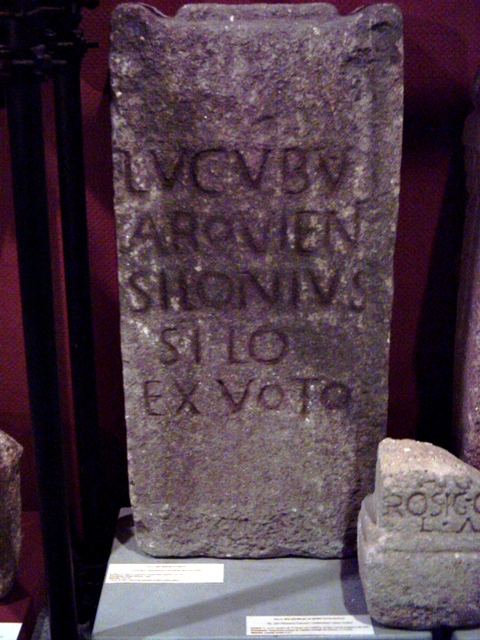
Votive inscription to the Lugoves in Gallaecia: LUCOUBU ARQUIEN(obu) SILONIUS SILO EX VOTO cf.

Hispano-Celtic is a term for all forms of Celtic spoken in the Iberian Peninsula before the arrival of the Romans (c. 218 BC, during the Second Punic War). In particular, it includes:

- A northeastern inland language attested at a relatively late date in the extensive corpus of Celtiberian. This variety, which Jordán Cólera proposed to name Northeastern Hispano-Celtic, has long been synonymous with the term Hispano-Celtic and is universally accepted as Celtic.
- A language in the northwest corner of the peninsula, with a northern and western boundary marked by the Atlantic Ocean, a southern boundary along the river Douro, and an eastern boundary marked by Oviedo, which Jordán Cólera has proposed to call Northwestern Hispano-Celtic, where there is a corpus of Latin inscriptions containing isolated words and sentences that are clearly Celtic.

== Western Hispano-Celtic continuum hypothesis ==
Western Hispano-Celtic is a term that has been proposed for a dialect continuum on the western side of the Iberian Peninsula, including Gallaecian in the north, Tartessian in the south (according to Koch), and others in between such as Lusitanian (which has sometimes been labelled "para-Celtic"), west of an imaginary line running north–south between Oviedo and Mérida. According to Koch, the Western Celtic varieties of the Iberian Peninsula share with Celtiberian a sufficient core of distinctive features to justify Hispano-Celtic as a term for a linguistic subfamily, as opposed to a purely-geographical classification. In Naturalis Historia 3.13 (written 77–79 CE), Pliny the Elder says the Celtici of Baetica (now western Andalusia) descended from the Celtiberians of Lusitania since they shared common religions, languages and names for their fortified settlements.

== Vettonian-Lusitanian sound changes ==
As part of the effort to prove the existence of a western Iberian Hispano-Celtic dialect continuum, there have been attempts to differentiate the Vettonian dialect from the neighboring Lusitanian language using the personal names of the Vettones to describe the following sound changes (Proto-Indo-European to Proto-Celtic):

- *ō > ā occurs in Enimarus.
- *ō > ū in final syllables, as indicated by the suffix of Abrunus, Caurunius.
- *ē > ī is attested in the genitive singular Riuei.
- *n̥ > an appears in Argantonius.
- *m̥ > am in names with Amb-.
- *gʷ > b is attested in names such as Bouius, derived from *gʷow- 'cow'.
- *kʷ in PIE *perkʷ-u- 'oak' appears in a lenited form in the name Erguena.
- *p > ɸ > 0 is attested in:
1. *perkʷ-u- > ergʷ- in Erguena (see above).
2. *plab- > lab- in Laboina.
3. *uper- > ur- in Uralus and Urocius.
- However, *p is preserved in Cupiena, a Vettonian name not attested in Lusitania; also in names like Pinara, while *-pl- probably developed into -bl- in names like Ableca.

== Rejection of the Western Hispano-Celtic continuum hypothesis ==
The Western Hispano-Celtic continuum hypothesis received little support from linguists, who have widely rejected the Celtic interpretation of the Tartessian inscriptions and who generally have regarded Lusitanian as a non-Celtic language. The more generally accepted non-Celtic conclusion of Lusitanian studies has been confirmed by analysis of more recently discovered Lusitanian inscriptions, that clearly show that Lusitanian cannot be a Celtic language and in fact resembles the Italic languages.

== See also ==
- Continental Celtic languages
- List of Galician words of Celtic origin
- List of Spanish words of Celtic origin
- Paleohispanic languages
- Portuguese vocabulary
- Proto-Italic language
