= MLH =

MLH may refer to:

- Multi-line hunting, a method in telephony
- Major League Hockey, now Allan Cup Hockey
- Station code for Mill Hill (Lancashire) railway station, England
- IATA code for EuroAirport Basel-Mulhouse-Freiburg, France
- Postal code for Mellieħa, Malta
- Monoterpene epsilon-lactone hydrolase, an enzyme
- Monumenta Linguarum Hispanicarum, a series on materials relating to the paleo-Hispanic languages.
