= SXO =

SXO or sxo may refer to:

- SXO, the IATA code for São Félix do Araguaia Airport, Brazil
- sxo, the ISO 639-3 code for Sorothaptic language, Iberian Peninsula
