= Peñalba de Villastar =

Celtic sanctuary in Spain

Coordinates: 40.27383172°N 1.1776241°W

Peñalba de Villastar is a Celtiberian sanctuary in the municipality of Villastar, Aragon, Spain. About 10km south of Teruel, it is located at the eastern edge of Celtic Iberia. The sanctuary is along a cliff 1,500m in length, where soft white limestone and marl rock bears hundreds of inscriptions and graffiti.

The sanctuary was discovered by Juan Cabré in 1910. Cabré mostly focused on the inscriptions, which he traced and photographed, but did not attempt to decipher. Several inscriptions were removed by Cabré and by locals from the neighbouring village of Villel; some of these inscriptions are now lost, others are now at the Archaeology Museum of Catalonia. Research into the meaning of these inscriptions was undertaken by Manuel Gómez-Moreno, Michel Lejeune, Ulrich Schmoll and Antonio Tovar in the 1940s and 1950s, and by Jürgen Untermann in the 1970s. From the 1980s, attention began to be paid to the non-linguistic aspects of the site, such as the figurative graffiti.

The inscriptions are mostly very short. Their meaning is generally obscure, though thought to be religious in nature. Some appear to be personal names or the names of gods. The inscriptions are primarily written in the Latin script, but some are written in Paleohispanic scripts. The inscriptions in the Latin script are mostly in the Celtiberian language, with some in Latin. The inscriptions in Paleohispanic scripts are in the Iberian language. Most of the inscriptions seem to date between the 1st century BCE and the 1st century CE. The two longest inscriptions are a passage from the Aeneid, and what is perhaps a dedication to the Celtic god Lugus.
