= Novallas bronze tablet =

Ancient tablet discovered in Spain

The Novallas bronze tablet dates to the late first century BCE and is the longest known Celtiberian text in Latin orthography. Though fragmentary, the text seems to discuss agreements between different cities in the region for how wide spaces between buildings and fields should be, presumably for purposes of right of way.

The fragmentary tablet measures 18.1 centimeter high at its longest, 22.5 cm. at its widest, and .2 cm thick. A small square hole at what seems to be the top would suggest that the plaque was nailed to a wall or some other structure, as was common with official notices. The carefully incised Latin capitals are between 0.7 and 0.9 cm high.

The Novallas Bronze was discovered by chance at the Chicharroya III site, which is in the district of Novallas (Zaragoza), Spain, in the early 21st century. It was placed in the Zaragosa Museum in 2012.

== Text transcription ==
[---]OQVENDI ⋅ ANDO ⋅ BEDAM ⋅ DV ⋅ CASCA

[--V]TICAŚ ⋅ TERGAŚ ⋅ DOIBIM ⋅ ODAS ⋅ PVBLI-

[---]VS ⋅ IIS ⋅ DVNDOM ⋅ LITANOM ⋅ PVBLIC+[-1-] ̣

[-OD]+AS ⋅ II ⋅ ECQVE ⋅ S ⋅ VAMVŚ ⋅ LITANAṂ [-1-2?-]

5 [---]ẠM ⋅ AVDINTVM ⋅ ODAS PVBLICVS [-2-]

[---] ⋅ BEDAS ⋅ MEDOM ⋅ CONTREBAC[-2-3-]

[---]+ẸIS ⋅ CABINT ⋅ SAM ⋅ BEDAM ⋅ T[IE?-]

[---]++GAM ⋅ DERNV[-2-3-]

[---]ẸTAM ⋅ CA+[-2-3-]

10 [---]S ⋅ PVBL[-1-2-] ̣

[---]ẠD[-1-2?-]

== Notes ==
Given the fragmentary nature of the text and our limited knowledge of Celtiberian, anything close to a full translation is impossible. But various place names and phrases can be recognized, with varying degrees of certainty.

=== Celtiberian words and phrases ===
In line 2, the form DOIBIM is explained by Stifter as a dative dual *dou̯ibim ‘to the two.’

On DVNDOM LITANOM and VAMVŚ LITANAṂ on lines 3 and 4, see below.

In line 5, for AVDITUM Jordán Cólera suggests an origin from the Proto-Indo-European root *h_{2}ew-d^{h}eh_{1}- / *h_{2}ew-d^{h}h_{1}-o "grant, bestow, donate," specifically from the genitive plural of the present active participle of this verb: *h_{2}ew-d^{h}eh_{1}-nt-ōm "of the donating ones."

Line 6. For BEDAS see below. Stifter claims MEDOM may be compared with Old Irish med ‘measure, balance’ and Welsh medd ‘authority’.

In line 7, Jordán Cólera proposes that the form CABINT is a third person plural present indicative or possibly optitive form of a verb related to Old Irish gabaid "take." And he takes SAM BEDAM to be 'this mine' or some such, with the first form a feminine accusative singular of the Celtiberian (and Common Celtic) demonstrative, and the next form, agreeing with it, from PIE *bhedh- ‘dig,’ from which Lat. fodio, fossa, Breton béz ‘grave, pit’...

n line 8, Stifter claims that the fragmentary DERNV- may be compared with words for ‘hand’ or ‘palm’ in other Celtic languages.

=== Celtiberian place names ===
Those that can be identified with some confidence include:

Line 1: CASCA- probably refers to the ancient city of Cascantum, identified with the modern town of Cascante.

Line 2: TERGAŚ is perhaps the ablative of the name of a town (so "from Terga") referred to on late 2nd century bce coins as terkakom ("of the people of Terga) perhaps equivalent to the modern municipality of Tierga.

Line 6: CONTREBAC[OM?] is probably connected to kontebakom, a form attested in Palaeohispanic script. It looks to be adjective formed by the common suffix -āko-, "from a substantive contrebia, the etymology of which seems clear: kom- (“together”) + *treb- (“to live, habitation”) + *-yā collective suffix." So something like 'where [people] live together.' "We know three Celtiberian cities called Contrebia: Contrebia Belaisca,28 Contrebia Carbica,29 and Contrebia Leucada." The last of these was quite near Novalla, but the term could well have been an adjective attached to many settlement, not necessarily any of these mentioned.

=== Latin, or Latin influenced, words and phrases ===
Line 1: (-?)L]OQUENDI, presumably from the gerundive of Latin loquor "to speak" or a compound thereof. So probably "(These things) are to be announced (publicly) (at such and such time(s) and place(s)," the rest of the legible text presumably being the 'these things' to be announced, especially given that monetary units or spatial measurements seem to be mentioned in lines 3 and 4 (see below). This would mean that any indication of when and where the announcement is to be made came in the lost part of the text before what we have legible to us.

Lines 2, 3, 5, and 10: PUBL(ICUS), in lines two and five, apparently part of a full phrase ODUS PUBL(ICUS). The latter would seem to reflect the Latin phrase pedes publicos, 'feet of the people(?)' (with loss of p- as expected in Celtic, a loss not evidenced, though, in the following word!), presumably an official 'public' measurement, except that this Latin phrase is not actually recorded until medieval times.

Line 4: "The sequence II ECQVE S could also be borrowed from Latin, if II and S can be understood as a numeral and the abbreviation of semis." So if ECQUE reflects L. etque "and" this could mean "two and a half." This along with IIS in line 3 directly above could be referring to the Latin sestertius which originally meant "two asses (coins) and half of a third." But it is more likely that these numbers refer to measurements of space (see below). This is comparable to the first line of the seventh table (dealing with land use) of the Latin Law of Twelve Tables: "...ownership within a 5-foot strip shall not be acquired by long usage."

Following these apparent numerals IIS in line three is the phrase DVNDOM LITANOM (probably both masculine accusative) the first form of which could either be again a Latin gerundive "thing to be given" (but it could also be Celtiberian, from the same root) apparently in agreement with the following Celtiberian form that could mean 'wide,' whatever that combination is supposed to mean.

And following [--OD]AS II ECQVE S in line 4 is the phrase VAMVŚ LITANAṂ the first form of which seems to be a Celtiberian ablative of the superlative of "high", so "from the highest," while the second form looks to be the feminine equivalent of the term from the preceding line "wide." If this is a stipulation of how far apart two buildings can be, this may indicate that the walls of two buildings must be two and a half feet apart from each other measuring from the highest point on the external wall.

Beltrán Lloris et alia speculate that these phrases could be somehow connected to a Latin legal concept whereby the space of two and a half feet must be left by every property owner on each side of any boundary, totalling five feet (the quantity mentioned in the Twelve Tables—see above).

In line 7, Jordán Cólera proposes that the form CABINT is a third person plural present indicative or possibly optative form of a verb related to Old Irish gabaid "take." And he takes SAM BEDAM to be 'this mine' or some such, with the first form a feminine accusative singular of the Celtiberian (and Common Celtic) demonstrative, and the next form, agreeing with it, from PIE *bhedh- ‘dig,’ from which Lat. fodio, fossa, Breton béz ‘grave, pit’...

== Bibliography ==
- Ariño, B. D,. Ariño, M. J. Estarán, I. Simon M. J. Estarán, I. Simon. "Writing, colonization, and Latinization in the Iberian peninsula" Palaeohispanic Languages and Epigraphies 28 February 2019. pp. 396–416
- Beltrán Lloris, Francisco; Bienes Calvo, Juan José; Hernández Vera, José Antonio; Cólera, Carlos Jordán. "The bronze Celtiberian Latin alphabet of Novallas" (Zaragoza). Palaeohispanica (Zaragoza), 2013–01, Vol.13, p. 615-635
- Beltrán Lloris, F. and B. Díaz Ariño eds. Language contact and the spread of epigraphic cultures in the Western Mediterranean, 3rd to 1st c. BCE. 2018. El nacimiento de las culturas epigráficas en el Occidente mediterráneo. Modelos romanos y desarrollos locales (III-I a.E.). Anejos de AEspA 85. Madrid: Consejo Superior de Investigaciones Científicas. p. 287. ISBN 978-84-00-10419-1 (e-ISBN 978-84-00-10420-7)
- Francisco Beltrán Lloris, Carlos Jordán Cólera, Borja Díaz Ariño1, and Ignacio Simón Cornago. El Bronce de Novallas (Zaragoza) y la epigrafía celtibérica en alfabeto latino Museo de Zaragoza. Zaragoza(2021) http://museodezaragoza.es/wp-content/uploads/2021/10/Boleti%CC%81n-Museo-no-21.pdf
- Beltrán Lloris, F., Carlos Jordán Cólera, Borja Díaz Ariño1, and Ignaci, Simón Cornago. "The Novallas bronze tablet: An inscription in the Celtiberian language and the Latin alphabet from Spain." Journal of Roman Archaeology 34 (2021), 713–733 doi:10.1017/S1047759421000635
- Jordán Cólera, Carlos "La forma verbal cabint del bronce celtibérico de Novallas (Zaragoza)" Consejo Superior de Investigaciones Científicas Emerita, 2014-12, Vol.82 (2), p. 327-343
- Jordán Cólera, Carlos. "La valeur du s diacrité dans les inscriptions celtibères en alphabet latin." Paris : E. Droz Etudes Celtiques, 2015, Vol.41 (1), p. 75-94
- Jordán Cólera, Carlos. "Avdintvm, una nueva forma verbal en celtibérico y sus posibles relaciones paradigmáticas (auzeti, auzanto, auz, auzimei, auzares...)" Universidad Complutense de Madrid. Cuadernos de filología clásica. Estudios griegos e indoeuropeos, 2015-05, Vol.25 (25), pp. 11–23
- Jordán Cólera, C. "Celtiberian inscriptions on bronze plaques" Chapter 14 in Beltrán Lloris, F. and B. Díaz Ariño (2018)
- Cólera, Carlos Jordán. "Chronica Epigraphica Celtiberica XI" Zaragoza: Institucion "Fernando el Catolico" Palaeohispanica (Zaragoza), 2022-01, Vol.22, p. 275. "8. El Bronce de Novallas" pp. 304–315
- Stifter, David. "Contributions to Celtiberian Etymology III. The Bronze of Novallas" Palaeohispanica 22. 2022. pp. 131–136
