= Tartessian language =

Extinct unclassified language of southwest Iberia

Tartessian
- Region: Southwest Iberian Peninsula
- Extinct: after 5th century BC
- Language family: unclassified
- Writing system: Southwest Paleo-Hispanic

Language codes
- ISO 639-3: txr
- Glottolog: tart1237
- Approximate extent of Tartessian influence

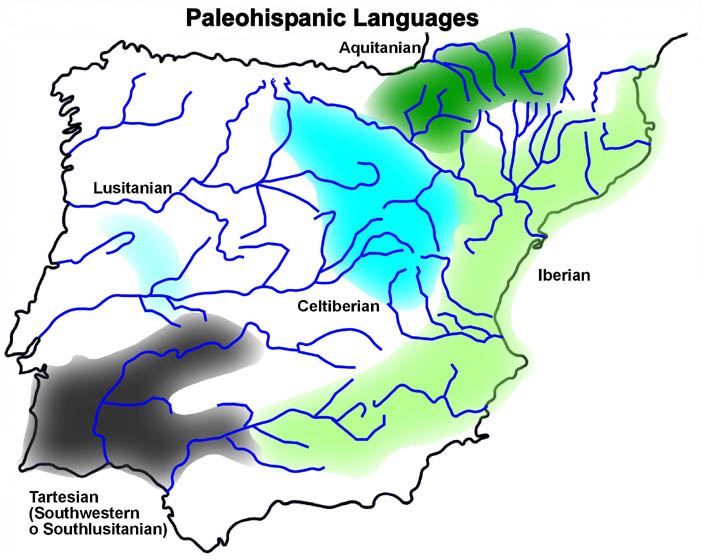
Tartessian language in the context of Paleo-Hispanic languages around 300 BCE

Tartessian is an extinct Paleo-Hispanic language found in the Southwestern inscriptions of the Iberian Peninsula, mainly located in the historical Tartessos, the south of Portugal (Algarve and southern Alentejo), and the southwest of Spain (south of Extremadura and western Andalusia). There are 95 such inscriptions, and the longest has 82 readable signs. Around one third of them were found in Early Iron Age necropolises or other Iron Age burial sites associated with rich complex burials. Five of them occur on stelae that have been interpreted as Late Bronze Age carved warrior gear from the Central European Urnfield culture. It is usual to date them to the 7th century BC and to consider this script to be the most ancient Paleo-Hispanic one, with characters most closely resembling specific Phoenician letter forms found in inscriptions dated to c. 825 BC.

== Name ==
Most researchers use the term Tartessian to refer to the language as attested on the stelae written in the Southwestern script, but some researchers would prefer to reserve it for the language of the core Tartessian zone, attested in some archaeological graffiti – like the Huelva graffito– and maybe with some stelae such as at Villamanrique de la Condesa (J.52.1). Such researchers consider that the language of the inscriptions found outside the core Tartessian zone would be either a different language or maybe a Tartessian dialect and so they would prefer to identify the language of the stelae with a different title: "southwestern" or "south-Lusitanian". There is general agreement that the core area of Tartessos is around Huelva, extending to the valley of the Guadalquivir, but the area under Tartessian influence is much wider (see maps). Three of the 95 stelae and some graffiti, belong to the core area: Alcalá del Río (Untermann J.53.1), Villamanrique de la Condesa (J.52.1) and Puente Genil (J.51.1). Four have also been found in the Middle Guadiana (in Extremadura), and the rest have been found in the south of Portugal (Algarve and Lower Alentejo), where the Greek and Roman sources locate the pre-Roman Cempsi and Sefes and Cynetes peoples.

== History ==
The most confident dating is for the Tartessian inscription (J.57.1) in the necropolis at Medellín, Badajoz, Spain to 650/625 BC. Further confirmatory dates for the Medellín necropolis include painted ceramics of the 7th–6th centuries BC.

In addition, a graffito on a Phoenician sherd dated to the early to mid 7th century BC and found at the Phoenician settlement of Doña Blanca near Cadiz has been identified as Tartessian by the shape of the signs. It is only two signs long, reading ]tetu[ or perhaps ]tute[. It does not show the syllable-vowel redundancy more characteristic of the southwestern script, but it is possible that this developed as indigenous scribes adapted the script from archaic Phoenician and other such exceptions occur.

The script used in the mint of Salacia (Alcácer do Sal, Portugal) from around 200 BC may be related to the Tartessian script, though it has no syllable-vowel redundancy; violations of this are known, but it is not clear if the language of this mint corresponds with the language of the stelae.

The Turdetani of the Roman period are generally considered the heirs of the Tartessian culture. Strabo mentions that: "The Turdetanians are ranked as the wisest of the Iberians; and they make use of an alphabet, and possess records of their ancient history, poems, and laws written in verse that are six thousand years old, as they assert." It is not known when Tartessian ceased to be spoken, but Strabo (writing c. 7 BC) records that "The Turdetanians ... and particularly those that live about the Baetis, have completely changed over to the Roman mode of life; with most of the populace not even remembering their own language any more."

== Writing ==
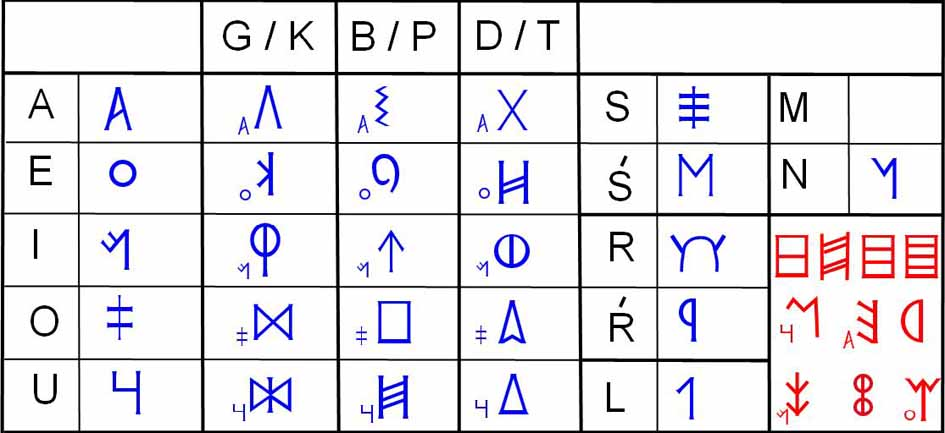
Sound values proposed by Rodríguez Ramos (2000)

Tartessian inscriptions are in the Southwestern script, which is also known as the Tartessian or South Lusitanian script. Like all other Paleo-Hispanic scripts, except for the Greco-Iberian alphabet, Tartessian uses syllabic glyphs for plosive consonants and alphabetic letters for other consonants. Thus, it is a mixture of an alphabet and a syllabary that is called a semi-syllabary. Some researchers believe these scripts are descended solely from the Phoenician alphabet, but others think that the Greek alphabet had an influence as well.

The Tartessian script is very similar to the Southeastern Iberian script, both in the shapes of the signs and in their values. The main difference is that the Southeastern Iberian script does not redundantly mark the vocalic values of syllabic characters, which was discovered by Ulrich Schmoll and allows the classification of most of the characters into vowels, consonants and syllabic characters. As of the 1990s, the decipherment of the script was largely complete and so the sound values of most of the characters are known. Like most other Paleo-Hispanic scripts, Tartessian does not distinguish between voiced and unvoiced consonants ([t] from [d], [p] from [b] or [k] from [ɡ]).

Tartessian is written in scriptio continua, which complicates the identification of individual words.

== Classification ==
Although some Tartessian anthroponyms have been interpreted as Celtic, the language as a whole remains undeciphered. Since 2009, John T. Koch has argued that Tartessian is a Celtic language and that the inscriptions can be translated as such, while others, such as Terrence Kaufman, have regarded a Celtic affiliation as possible. However, this proposal has not been widely accepted, and some scholars consider that all Celtic elements are borrowings and that Tartessian is a language isolate.

The academic consensus regarding the classification of Tartessian was summarized by de Hoz in 2019:

J. Koch’s recent proposal that the south-western inscriptions should be deciphered as Celtic has had considerable impact, above all in archaeological circles. However, the almost unanimous opinion of scholars in the field of Palaeohispanic studies is that, despite the author’s indisputable academic standing, this is a case of a false decipherment based on texts that have not been sufficiently refined, his acceptance of a wide range of unjustified variations, and on purely chance similarities that cannot be reduced to a system; these deficiencies give rise to translations lacking in parallels in the recorded epigraphic usage.

== Texts ==
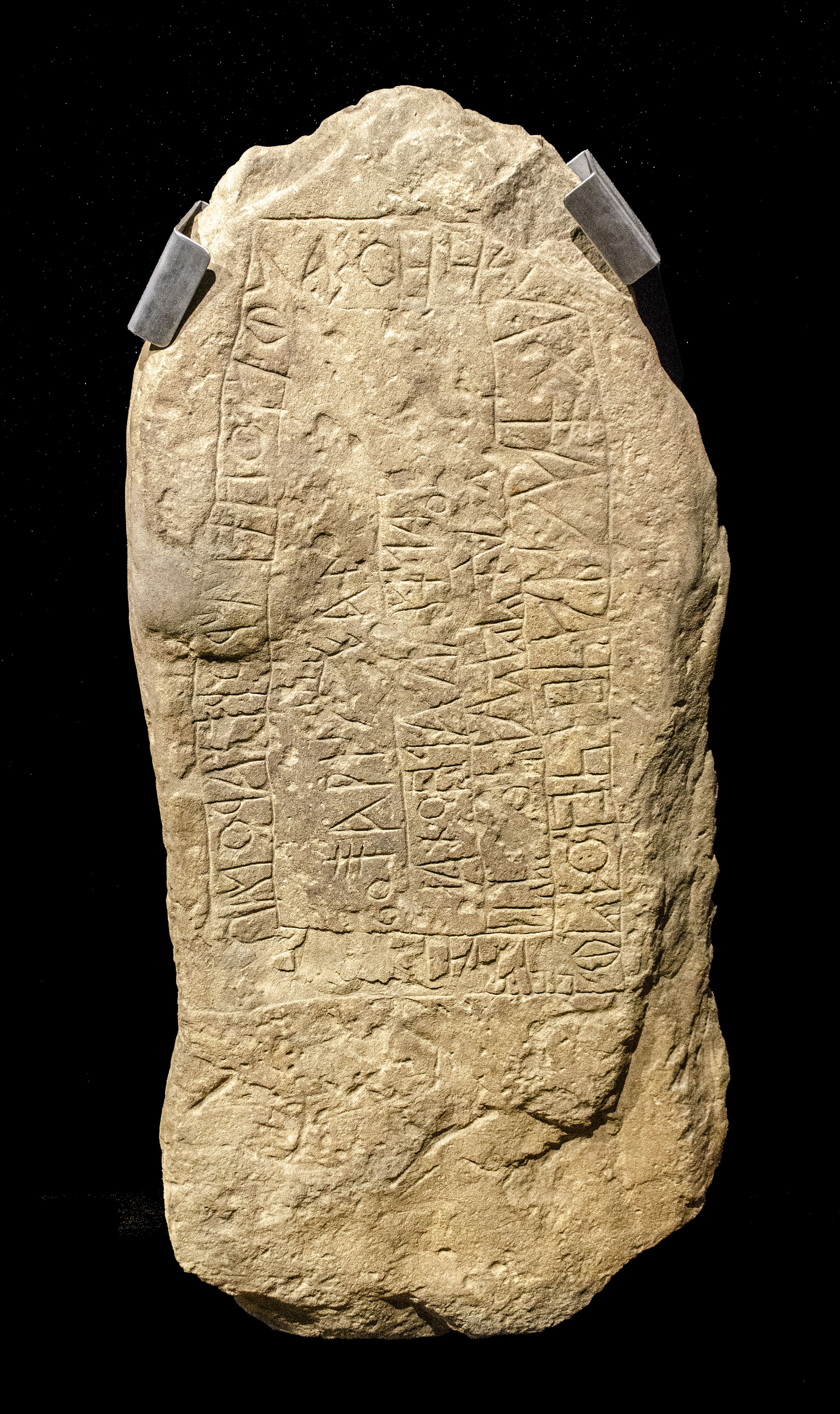
Mesas de Castelinho (Almodôvar)

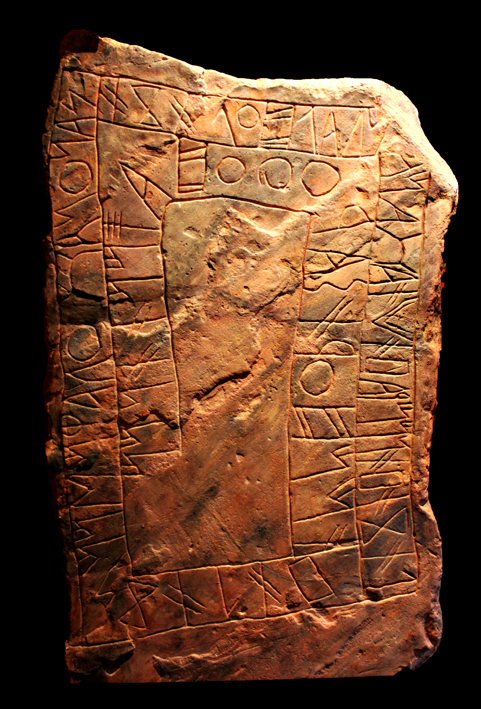
Fonte Velha (Bensafrim) (J.53.1)

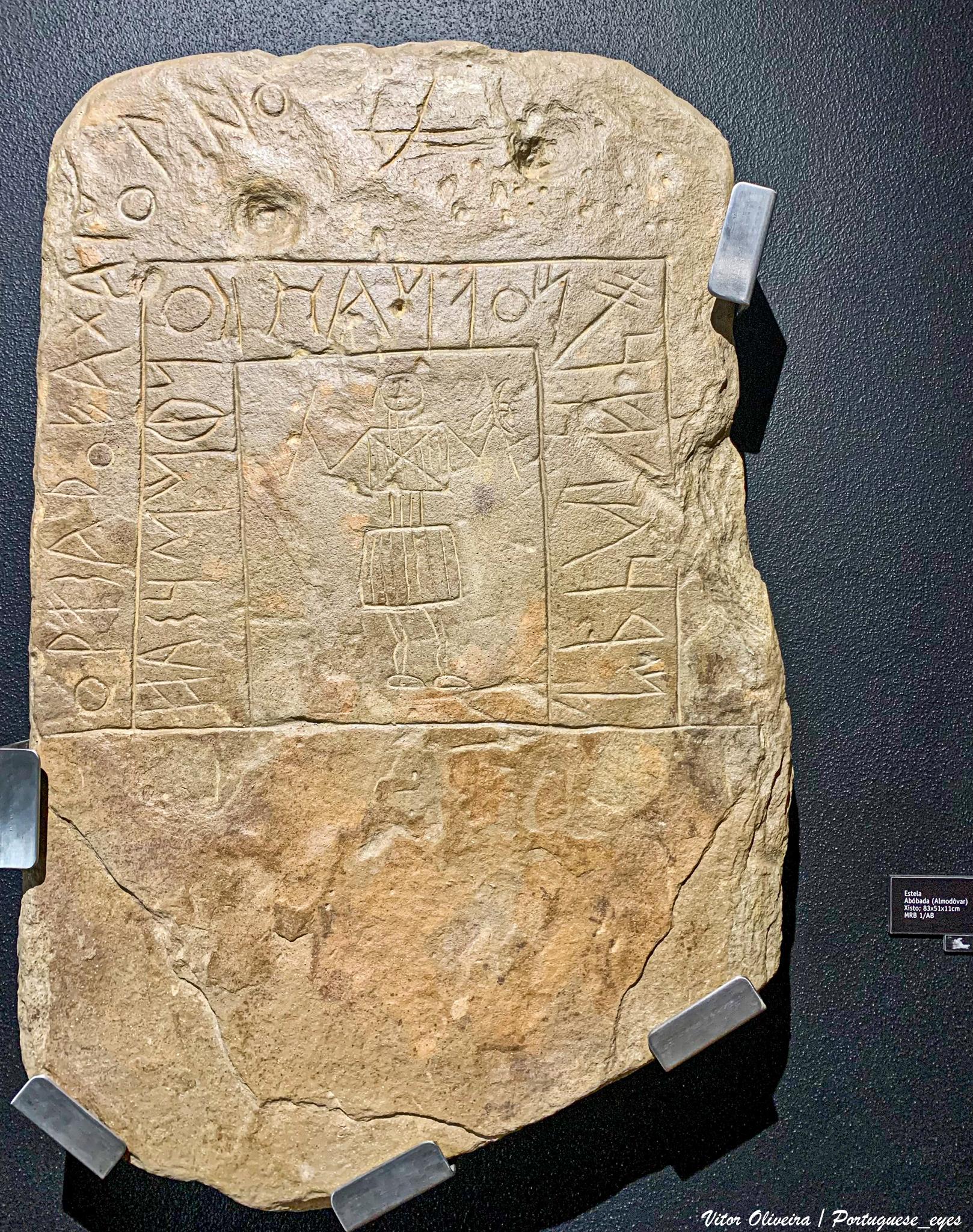
Herdade da Abobada (Almodôvar) (J.12.1)

(The following are examples of Tartessian inscriptions. Untermann's numbering system (per MLH IV) or location name in newer transcriptions, is cited in brackets, e.g. (J.19.1) or (Mesas do Castelinho). Transliterations are by Rodríguez Ramos.

Mesas do Castelinho (Almodôvar):

tᶤilekᵘuṟkᵘuarkᵃastᵃaḇᵘutᵉebᵃantᶤilebᵒoiirerobᵃarenaŕḵᵉ[en?]aφiuu
lii*eianiitᵃa
eanirakᵃaltᵉetᵃao
bᵉesaru[?]an

Segmentation: Tᶤile kᵘuṟkᵘuarkᵃas tᵃa ḇᵘutᵉebᵃan. Tᶤile bᵒoii tᵉero bᵃare naŕkᵉe aφiuuliieianii. Tᵃa eanira Kᵃaltᵉe. Tᵃa obᵉesaru[?]an.

This is the longest Tartessian text known at present, with 82 signs, 80 of which have an identifiable phonetic value. The text is complete if it is assumed that the damaged portion contains a common, if poorly-understood, Tartessian phrase-form bᵃare naŕkᵉe[n—]. The formula contains two groups of Tartessian stems that appear to inflect as verbs: naŕkᵉe, naŕkᵉen, naŕkᵉeii, naŕkᵉenii, naŕkᵉentᶤi, naŕkᵉenai and bᵃare, bᵃaren, bᵃareii, bᵃarentᶤi from comparison with other inscriptions.

Fonte Velha (Bensafrim) (J.53.1):

lokᵒobᵒoniirabᵒotᵒoaŕaiaikᵃaltᵉelokᵒonanenaŕ[–]ekᵃa[?]ᶤiśiinkᵒolobᵒoiitᵉerobᵃarebᵉetᵉasiioonii

Segmentation: Logo bonii ra botoaŕaiai galte, logo nanenaŕeŋaginśiiugolo boii tero bare betasiioonii.

Herdade da Abobada (Almodôvar) (J.12.1):

iŕualkᵘusielnaŕkᵉentᶤimubᵃatᵉerobᵃare[?]ᵃatᵃaneatᵉe

Segmentation: iŕual kᵘusiel naŕkᵉen tᶤimubᵃa tᵉero bᵃare-[?]ᵃa. Tᵃa ne atᵉe.

In the texts above, there are repetition of bᵃare-, naŕkᵉe-, tᶤile-, bᵒoii-, -tᵉero-, kᵃaltᵉe-, lok-, -ᵒonii, whereas bᵒoii tᵉero-bᵃare repeats three times, with assumably rero as a corruption of tᵉero in Mesas do Castelinho transcription. tᶤile- and lokᵒo appear in the beginning of their sentences.

== See also ==
- Arganthonios
- Celtiberian language
- Hispano-Celtic languages
- Iberian language
- Lusitanian language
- National Museum of Archaeology (Portugal)
- Paleohispanic languages
- Pre-Roman peoples of the Iberian Peninsula
