= Henri Gaidoz =

Folklore researcher (1842–1932)

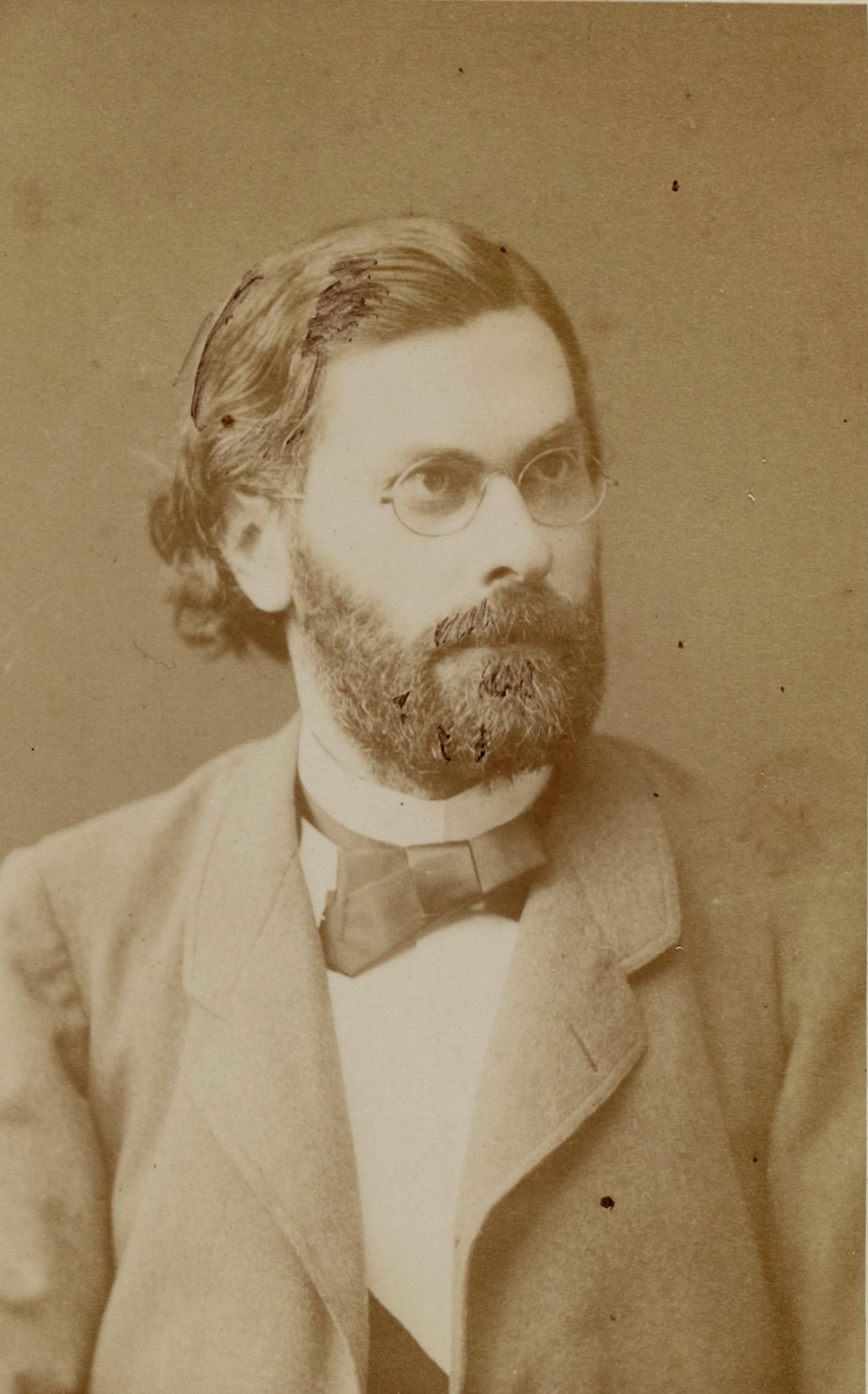
Élie Henri Anatole Gaidoz

Henri Gaidoz (1842–1932), was a collector and researcher of materials relating to folklore. His works and expertise was in the fields of philology, Celtic studies, archaeology, religion, and mythology.

In addition to his extensive collection of extracts and other materials, he sought to elevate the fields of folklore and mythology to a level of professionalism; Gaidoz founded two journals, Melusine and Revue Celtique. He opposed many contemporary views, and lampooned the writer Max Müller in an article that proved he 'was a solar myth'.

== Bibliography ==
- Gauthier, Claudine (2008). « Entre philologie et folklore. Biographie d'Henri Gaidoz », in BEROSE – International Encyclopaedia of the Histories of Anthropology, Paris.
- Postic, Fañch (2008). « Henri Gaidoz et la pétition pour les langues provinciales de 1870 », in BEROSE – International Encyclopaedia of the Histories of Anthropology, Paris.
- Voisenat, Claudie (2011). « Les relations Gaidoz-Sébillot ou la guerre des prééminences », in BEROSE – International Encyclopaedia of the Histories of Anthropology, Paris.
