= Monoterpene epsilon-lactone hydrolase =

Monoterpene ε-lactone hydrolase

Identifiers
- EC no.: 3.1.1.83

Databases
- IntEnz: IntEnz view
- BRENDA: BRENDA entry
- ExPASy: NiceZyme view
- KEGG: KEGG entry
- MetaCyc: metabolic pathway
- PRIAM: profile
- PDB structures: RCSB PDB PDBe PDBsum
Search
- PMC: articles
- PubMed: articles
- NCBI: proteins

The enzyme monoterpene ε-lactone hydrolase (EC 3.1.1.83, MLH; systematic name isoprop(en)ylmethyloxepan-2-one lactonohydrolase catalyses the reaction

(1) isoprop(en)ylmethyloxepan-2-one + H_{2}O $\rightleftharpoons$ 6-hydroxyisoprop(en)ylmethylhexanoate (general reaction)
(2) 4-isopropenyl-7-methyloxepan-2-one + H_{2}O $\rightleftharpoons$ 6-hydroxy-3-isopropenylheptanoate
(3) 7-isopropyl-4-methyloxepan-2-one + H_{2}O $\rightleftharpoons$ 6-hydroxy-3,7-dimethyloctanoate

The enzyme catalyses the ring opening of ε-lactones in Gram-positive bacterium Rhodococcus erythropolis DCL14.
