= Jürgen Untermann =

German linguist (1928–2013)

Jürgen Untermann

Jürgen Untermann (24 October 1928, in Rheinfelden – 7 February 2013, in Brauweiler) was a German linguist, Indo-Europeanist, and epigraphist.

A disciple of Hans Krahe and of Ulrich Schmoll, he studied at the University of Frankfurt and the University of Tübingen. He became a professor of Comparative Linguistics at the University of Cologne.

His research focused on the study of the Italic and Palaeohispanic languages, described as "Trümmersprachen" (ruins-languages). He is considered the foremost expert on Palaeohispanic languages (specially the Iberian language), publishing the corpus of Palaeohispanic inscriptions in Monumenta Linguarum Hispanicarum, and systematizing the study of the ancient Iberian names of human beings or anthroponomastics.

On 2010 he was awarded with the Príncipe de Viana Prize for Culture.

== Publications ==
1. Die vorgriechischen Sprachen Siziliens. Wiesbaden, 1958
2. Die venetischen Personennamen . Wiesbaden, 1961
3. Elementos de un atlas antroponímico de la Hispania Antigua. Madrid, 1965
4. Monumenta Linguarum Hispanicarum. I. Die Münzlegenden. Wiesbaden, 1975
5. Monumenta Linguarum Hispanicarum II: Die Inschriften in iberischer Schrift aus Südfrankreich. Wiesbaden, 1980
6. Monumenta Linguarum Hispanicarum III: Die iberischen Inschriften aus Spanien. Wiesbaden, 1990
7. Monumenta Linguarum Hispanicarum IV: Die tartessischen, keltiberischen und lusitanischen Inschriften. Wiesbaden, 1997
8. Wörterbuch des Oskisch-Umbrischen. Heidelberg, 2000

== Images ==
- Jürgen Untermann at his investiture as Doctor Honoris Causa by University of Santiago de Compostela (may the 9th, 2003).
