= Paleohispanic languages =

Pre-Roman languages indigenous to the Iberian Peninsula

Paleohispanic
- (geographic)
- Geographic distribution: Mainly, Iberia and southwestern France (including Andorra)
- Subdivisions: Vasconic; Iberian †; Tartessian †; Indo-European (some branches)

Language codes
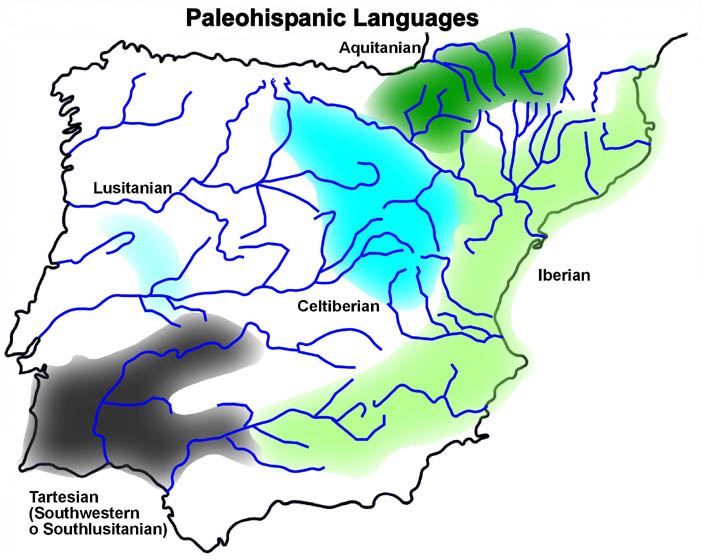
- Paleohispanic languages according to inscriptions (except Aquitanian – according to anthroponyms and theonyms used in Latin inscriptions).

- Pre-Roman languages of Iberia by 300 BCE.

The Paleo-Hispanic or Paleo-Iberian languages are the languages indigenous to the Pre-Roman peoples of the Iberian Peninsula, excluding languages of foreign colonies, such as Greek in Emporion and Phoenician in Qart Hadast. After the Roman conquest of Hispania the Paleohispanic languages, with the exception of Proto-Basque, were replaced by Latin, the ancestor of the modern Iberian Romance languages.

== Languages ==
Some of these languages were documented directly through inscriptions, mainly in Paleohispanic scripts, that date for sure between the 5th century BC, maybe from the 7th century in the opinion of some researchers, until the end of the 1st century BC or the beginning of the 1st century AD.

- Vasconic languages
  - Proto-Basque — Unattested, partially reconstructed through internal analysis of modern Basque. Proto-Basque is also the ancestor or sibling of the Aquitanian language (see below).
  - Aquitanian — Close relative of modern Basque. Some scholars characterise Aquitanian as an ancestor of Basque, while others describe Aquitanian and Basque as siblings both descended from Proto-Basque.
- Unclassified languages
  - Iberian — Shares many obvious similarities with the Vasconic languages. However, lack of data has thus far prevented scholars from determining whether these similarities arose from convergence due to intense contact, or whether Iberian does in fact possess a genetic relationship to the Vasconic languages.
  - Tartessian — Scholarly opinion places Tartessian definitely outside of the Indo-European family, but further classification remains uncertain. Tartessian seems to have borrowed many place names from some Celtic and/or other Indo-European languages; but its syllable structure is totally incompatible with the phonology of any Indo-European language, and much more compatible with the phonology of the Vasconic languages and Iberian. Despite this phonological compatibility, a lack of data has thus far made it impossible to clarify any relationship with the Vasconic languages or Iberian.
- Indo-European languages
  - Celtic languages
    - Celtiberian
    - Gallaecian
  - (Internally unclassified languages)
    - Lusitanian — Definitely an Indo-European language. Possibly Celtic or Italic, but a lack of data has prevented scholars from determining exactly where Lusitanian fits within the Indo-European family.
    - Sorothaptic — existence is disputed by scholars

== Classification ==
Of these languages, Celtiberian, Gallaecian, Lusitanian, and presumably Sorothaptic were Indo-European languages; Celtiberian and Gallaecian were Celtic languages, and Lusitanian may also have been, but the hypothetical Sorothaptic was not. Aquitanian was a precursor of Basque, while Tartessian and Iberian remain unclassified.

== See also ==
- Iberian languages
- Languages of Spain
- Languages of Portugal
- Hispano-Celtic languages
- Vasconic substrate hypothesis
- Paleo-European languages
- Pre-Indo-European languages
