= Monumenta Linguarum Hispanicarum =

Series of materials relating to the paleo-Hispanic languages

Monumenta Linguarum Hispanicarum (Latin for "Records of the Hispanic Languages") is a series which compiles material relating to the paleo-Hispanic languages (languages spoken in Iberia before Latin). Begun in the 1960s and the first volume published in 1975, the series was intended to supplant Emil Hübner's Monumenta Linguae Ibericae (1893). The volumes are largely the editorial work of Jürgen Untermann (1928–2013). The sixth volume, published in 2018, was edited posthumously from Untermann's notes. The series was completed in 2019 with the publication of a lexicon of the Iberian language.

== Volumes ==
- Untermann, Jürgen, ed. (1975). Monumenta Linguarum Hispanicarum. Band I: Die Münzlegenden. Weisbaden: Reichert. — Monetary legends
- Untermann, Jürgen, ed. (1980). Monumenta Linguarum Hispanicarum, Band II: Die Inschriften in iberischer Schrift in Südfrankreich. Weisbaden: Reichert. — Iberian language inscriptions of southern France
- Untermann, Jürgen, ed. (1992). Monumenta Linguarum Hispanicarum. Band III: Die iberischen Inschriften aus Spanien. Weisbaden: Reichert. — Iberian language inscriptions of Spain
  - Band III.1: Literaturverzeichnis, Einleitung. — Bibliography and introduction
  - Band III.2: Die Inschriften. — Inscriptions
- Untermann, Jürgen, ed. (1997). Monumenta Linguarum Hispanicarum. Band IV: Die Tartessischen, Keltiberischen Und Lusitanischen Inschriften. Weisbaden: Reichert. — Tartessian, Celtiberian, and Lusitanian language inscriptions
- Wodtko, Dagmar S. (2000). Untermann, Jürgen (ed.). Monumenta Linguarum Hispanicarum. Band V.1: Wörterbuch der keltiberischen Inschriften. Weisbaden: Reichert. — Glossary of the Celtiberian language
- Velaza, Javier; Moncunill, Noemí (2019). Koch, Michael (ed.). Monumenta Linguarum Hispanicarum. Band V.2: Lexikon der iberischen Inschriften. Weisbaden: Reichert. — Glossary of the Iberian language
- Untermann, Jürgen; de Hoz, Javier; Gorrochategui, Joaquin; Koch, Michael, eds. (2018). Monumenta Linguarum Hispanicarum. Band VI: Die vorrömische einheimische Toponymie des antiken Hispanien. Weisbaden: Reichert. — Toponymy of ancient Hispania
