= Sorothaptic language =

Extinct language of the Iberian Peninsula

Sorothaptic
- (disputed)
- Region: Iberian Peninsula
- Ethnicity: Urnfield culture
- Era: c. 200 CE
- Language family: Indo-European: (unclassified); Sorothaptic

Language codes
- ISO 639-3: sxo
- Glottolog: None

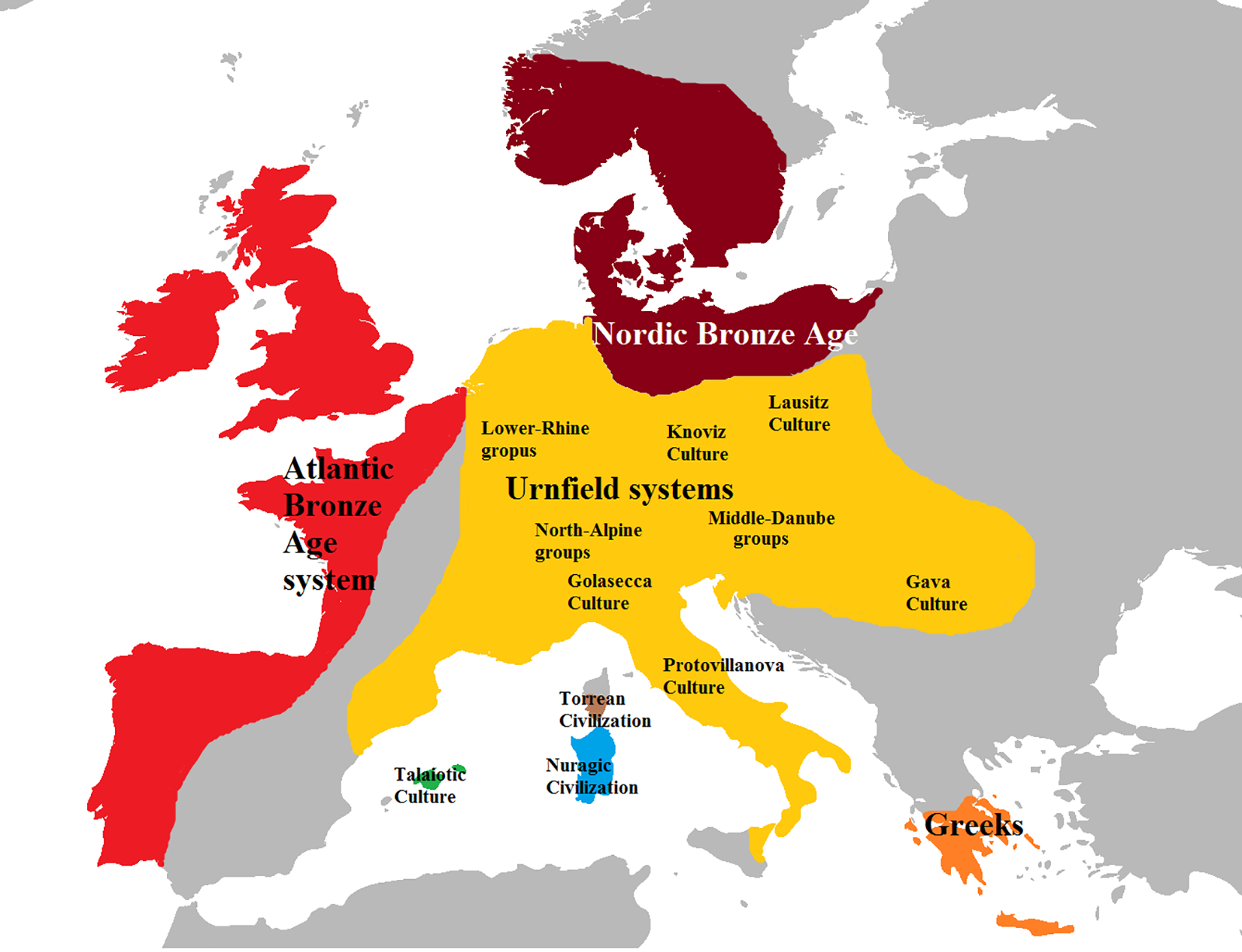
Europe during the late bronze age (1100 BC)

Sorothaptic (sorotáptico, sorotàptic, from Greek σορός sorós 'funerary urn' and θαπτός thaptós 'buried') is a name coined by Joan Coromines for the hypothetical language of the presumably Indo-European, but pre-Celtic, 1000 BC people of the Urnfield culture in the Iberian Peninsula.

Coromines used the concept of Sorothaptic to explain problematic words in the Iberian Romance languages. He identified the language with inscriptions on lead tablets, ca. 2nd century CE, found at Amélie-les-Bains on the Catalan–French border; these include some Latin but also a non-Latin and non-Celtic component that Coromines believed to be Sorothaptic. Coromines identifies them with the Urnfield culture from a millennium earlier, claiming to have found such "Sorothaptic" place names across Europe. Like the better-known Vasconic substrate hypothesis, Coromines' Sorothaptic hypothesis has not been well received.

== Bibliography ==
- Glanville Price, editor. 2000. Encyclopedia of the Languages of Europe.
- Cancik, Schneider, & Salazar, eds. 2008. Brill's New Pauly: Encyclopaedia of the Ancient World. Leiden: Brill.
- Coromines, Joan. 1976. Entre dos llenguatges (II). Curial Edicions Catalanes.
