= Villastar =

Villastar, Spain
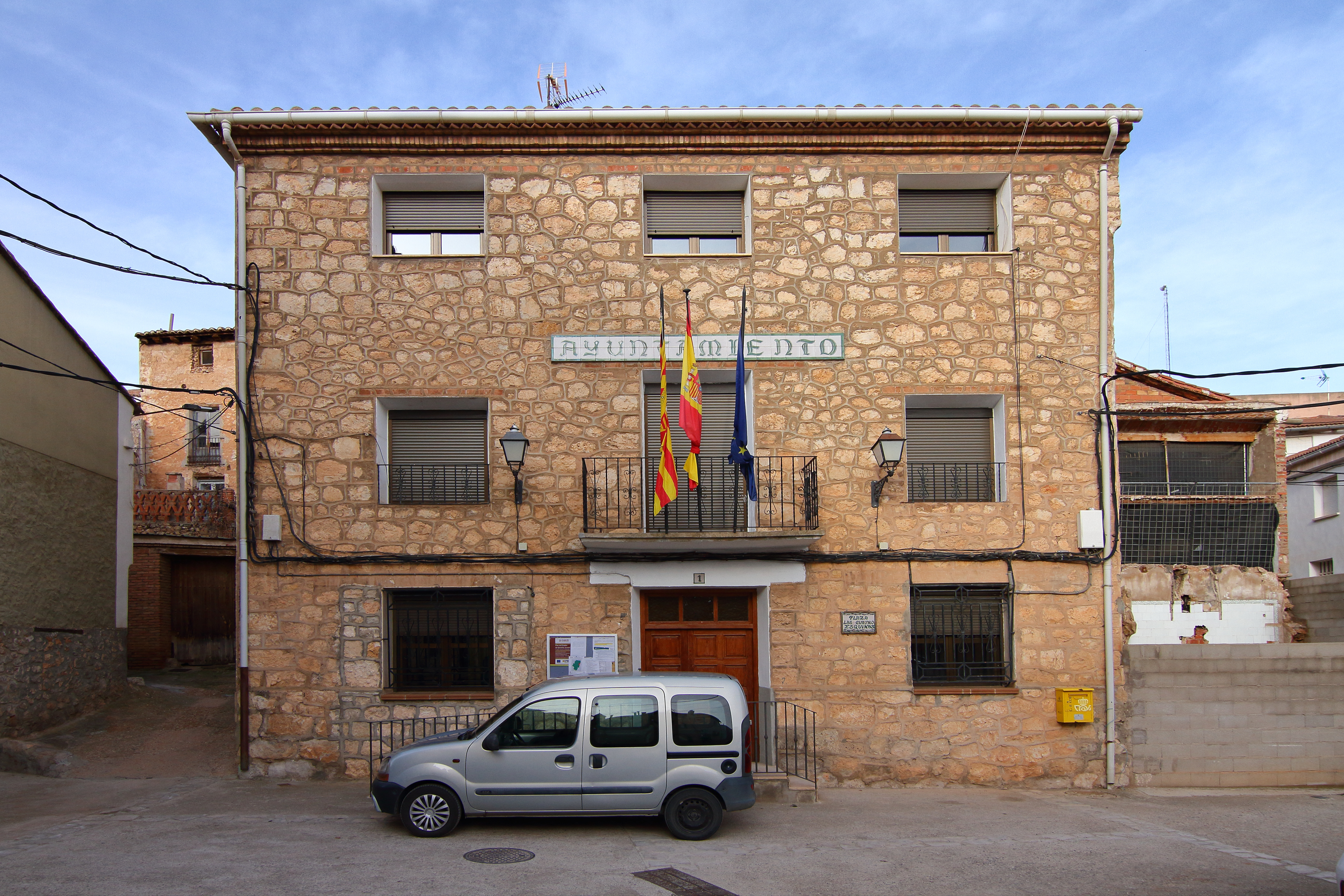
- Villastar, Ayuntamiento

- Flag Coat of arms

- Location within Spain
- Coordinates: 40°17′N 1°9′W
- Country: Spain
- Autonomous community: Aragon
- Province: Teruel
- Municipality: Villastar

Area
  - Total: 39.05 km^{2} (15.08 sq mi)
- Elevation: 867 m (2,844 ft)

Population (2025-01-01)
  - Total: 566
  - Density: 14.5/km^{2} (37.5/sq mi)
- Time zone: UTC+1 (CET)
  - Summer (DST): UTC+2 (CEST)

Villastar is a municipality located in the province of Teruel, Aragon, Spain.

== See also ==
- List of municipalities in Teruel
