= Iberian scripts =

Writing systems

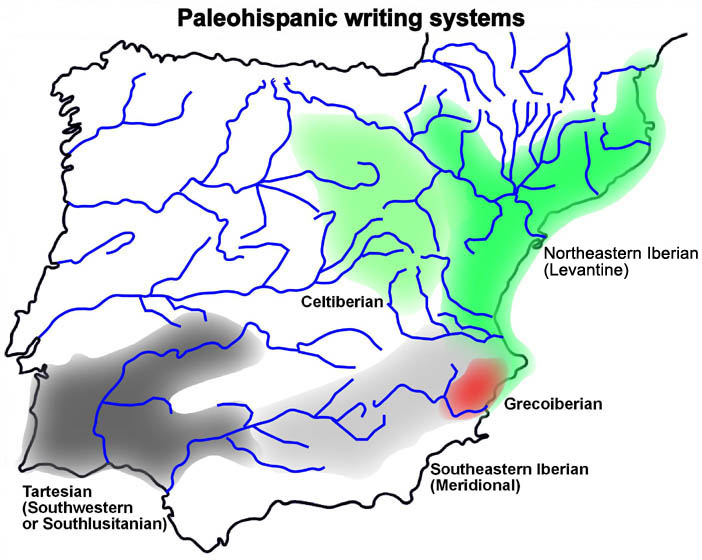
Iberian scripts in the context of Paleohispanic scripts

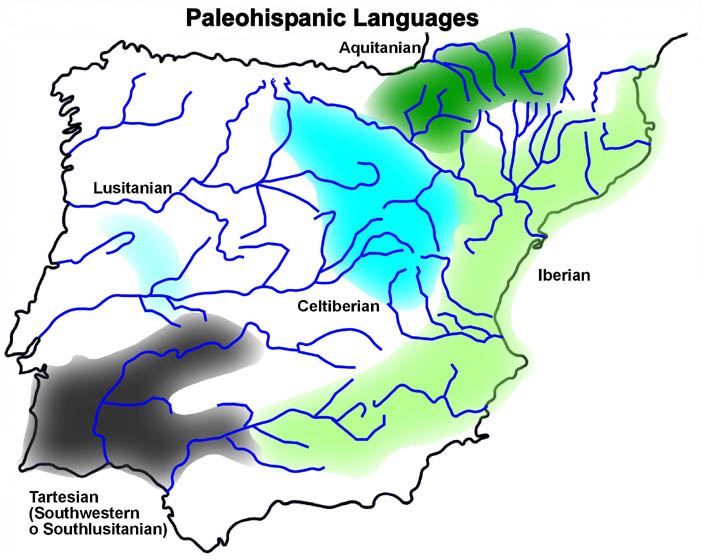
The Iberian language in the context of Paleohispanic languages. Light green (along the Mediterranean coast) is the Iberian language, dark grey (mainly southern Portugal) is the Tartessian language, dark blue (central Spain) is the Celtiberian language, light blue (mainly northern Portugal) is the Lusitanian language, and dark green (Eastern Pyrenees) is the Aquitanian language.

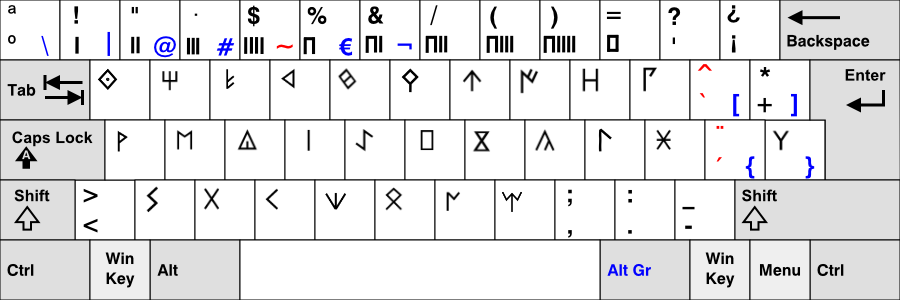
Paleohispanic Keyboard

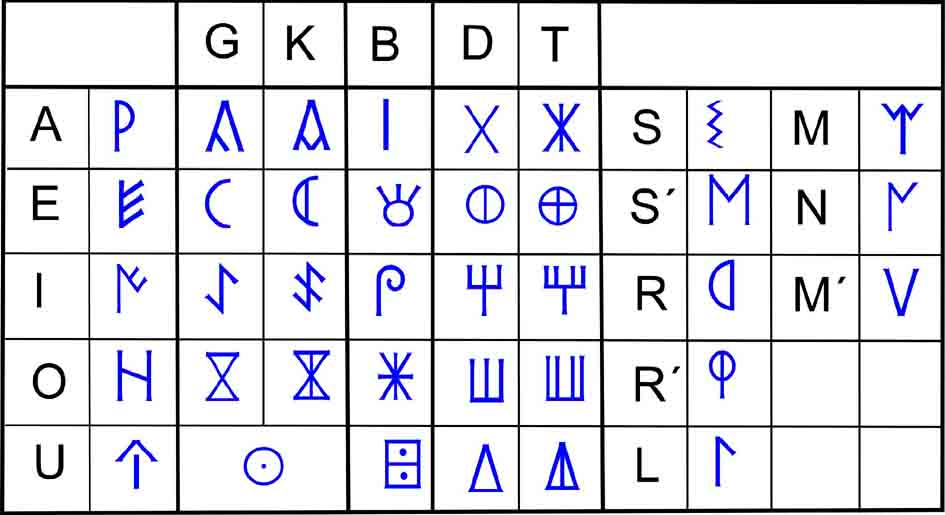
The proposed 'dual' variant of northeastern Iberian (Based on Ferrer i Jané 2005)

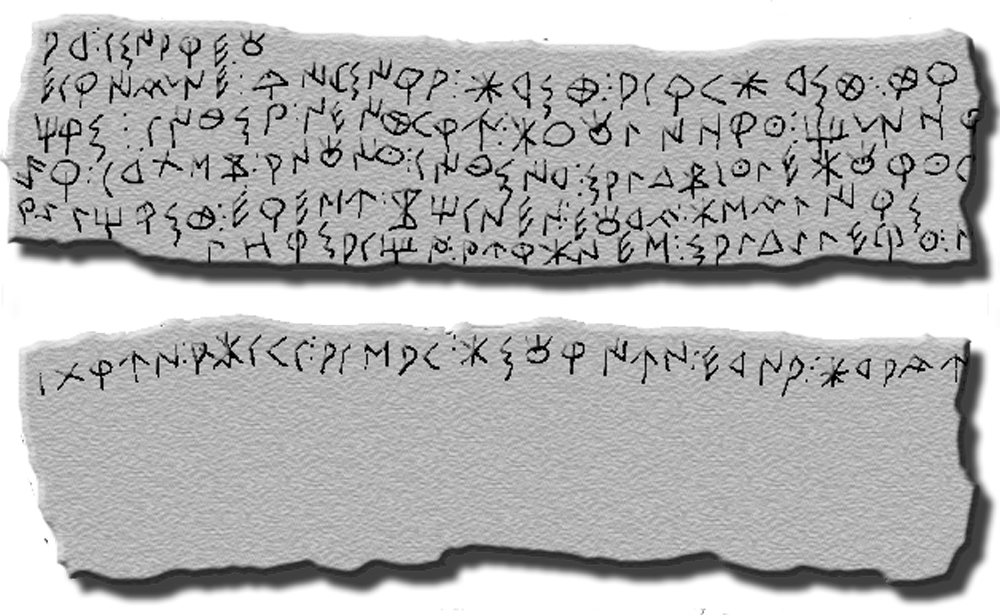
Lead plaque from Ullastret using the dual signary

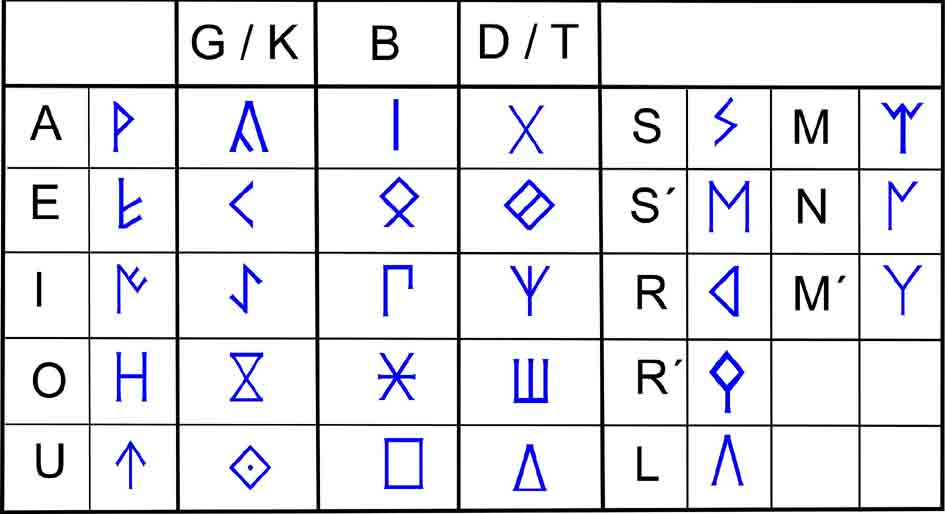
A northeastern Iberian signary (not dual)

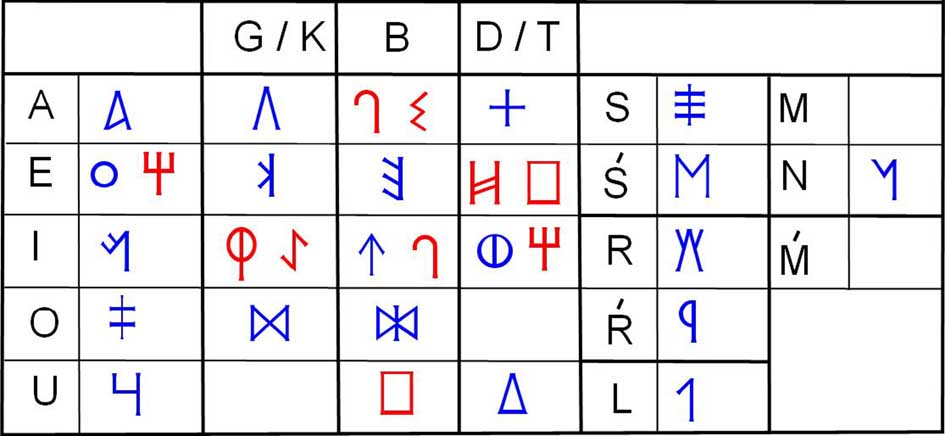
Possible values of the southeastern Iberian signary (Correa 2004). In red are the most debatable signs.

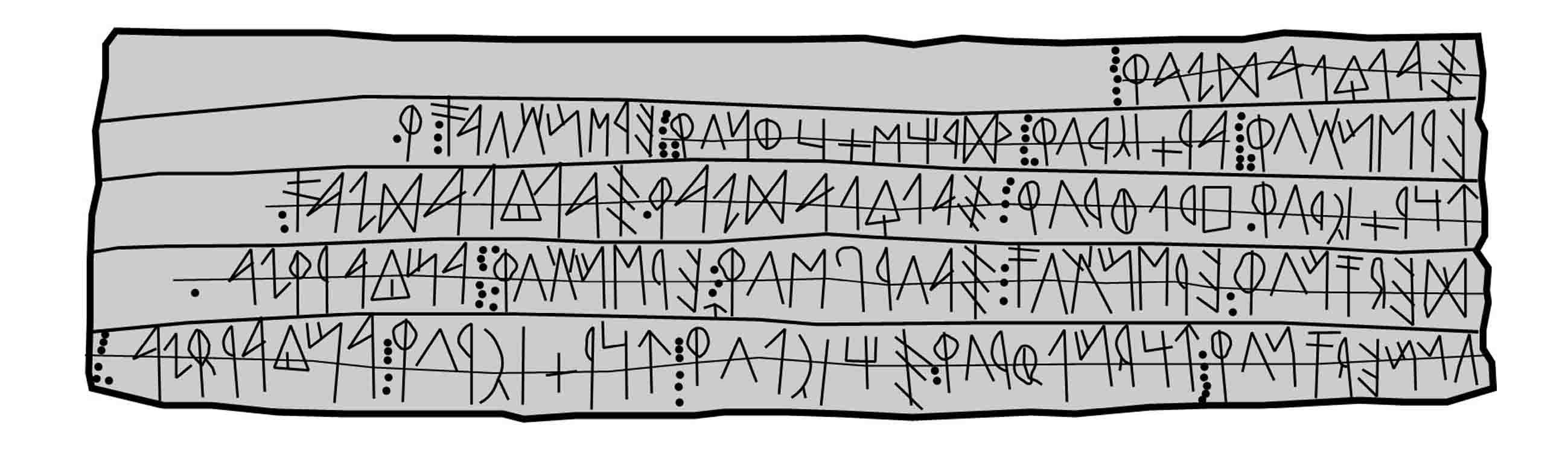
Lead plaque from La Bastida de les Alcusses (Moixent) using the southeastern signary

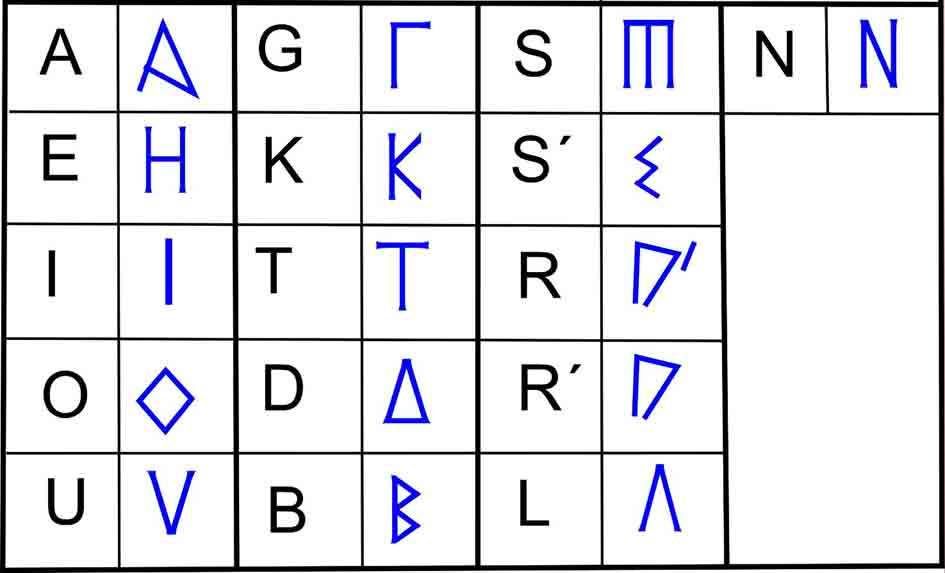
A Greco-Iberian alphabet

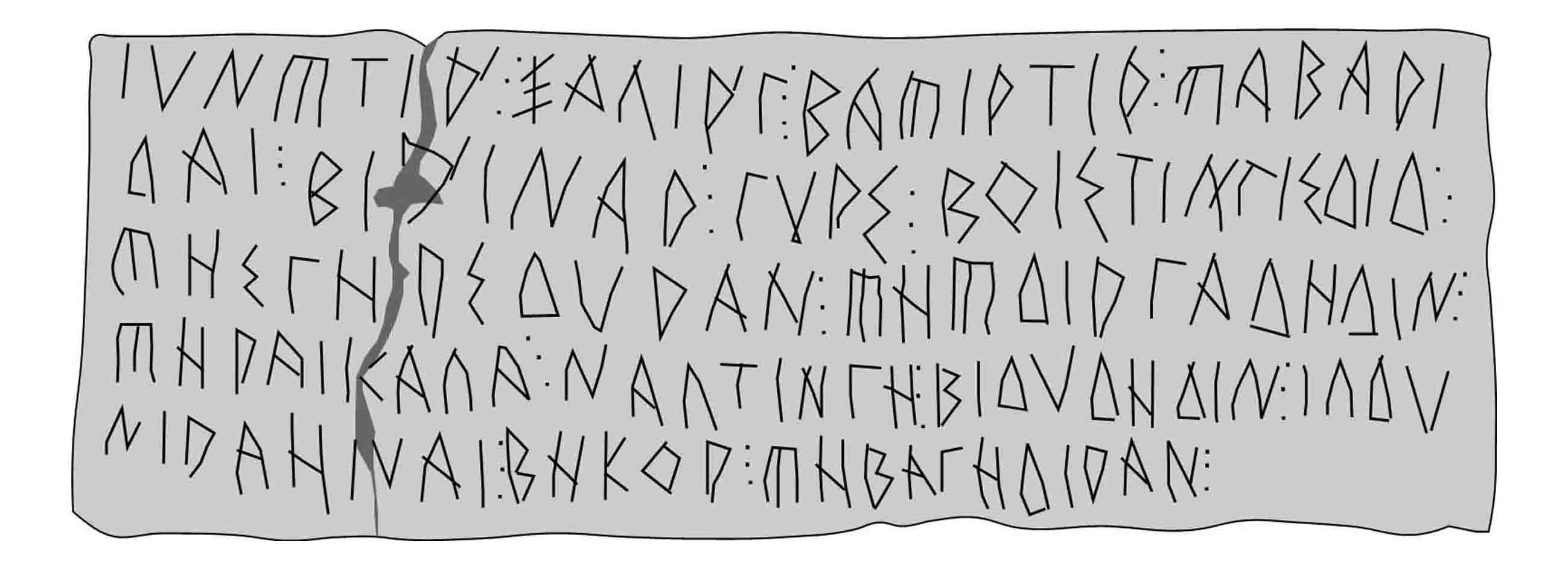
Lead plaque from la Serreta (Alcoi) using the Greco-Iberian alphabet

The Iberian scripts are the Paleohispanic scripts that were used to represent the extinct Iberian language. Most of them are typologically unusual in that they are semi-syllabic rather than purely alphabetic. The oldest Iberian inscriptions date to the 4th or possibly the 5th century BCE, and the latest from the end of the 1st century BCE or possibly the beginning of the 1st century CE.

== Variants ==
There are two main graphic as well as geographic variants in the family:

- Northeastern Iberian script
  - Dual variant (4th century BCE and 3rd century BCE) (tentative)
  - Non-dual variant (2nd century BCE and 1st century BCE)
- Southeastern Iberian script

In the sense that the Iberian scripts are the scripts created for the Iberians to represent the Iberian language, the Greco-Iberian alphabet, a separate adaptation of the Greek alphabet, was also an Iberian script. It was used mainly in Alicante and Murcia. Likewise, neither the southwestern script, very similar to southeastern Iberian script but used for the Tartessian language, nor the Celtiberian script, a direct adaptation of the northeastern Iberian script used for the Celtiberian language, are technically Iberian scripts.

The northeastern Iberian script is often known simply as the Iberian script, because it is the script of 95% of known Iberian inscriptions. These have been found mainly in the northeastern quadrant of the Iberian Peninsula, mostly along the coast from Languedoc-Roussillon to Alicante, but with a deep penetration on the Ebro valley.

The southeastern Iberian script is poorly attested, and there are some gaps in the records: There are no positively identified symbols for /gu/, /do/, and /m/, for example. Unlike the northeastern Iberian script the decipherment of the southeastern Iberian script is not still closed, because there are a significant group of signs without consensus value. The southeastern inscriptions have been found mainly in the southeastern quadrant of Iberia: Eastern Andalusia, Murcia, Albacete, Alicante, and Valencia.

There is substantial graphic variation in the Iberian glyphs, and over the past several decades many scholars have come to believe that, at least in northeastern Iberian script (and recently also in Celtiberian script) some of this variation is meaningful. It appears that the original simple letters were assigned specifically to the voiced consonants /b/, /d/, /g/, whereas the voiceless consonants /t/ and /k/ were derived from /d/ and /g/ syllables with the addition of a stroke. (This is the so-called dual signary model: see the image at right). If correct, this innovation would parallel the creation of the Latin letter G from C by the addition of a stroke.

== Typology ==
Excepting the Greco-Iberian alphabet, the Iberian scripts are typologically unusual, in that they were partially alphabetic and partially syllabic: Continuants (fricative sounds like /s/ and sonorants like /l/, /m/, and vowels) were written with distinct letters, as in Phoenician (or in Greek in the case of the vowels), but the non-continuants (the stops /b/, /d/, /t/, /g/, and /k/) were written with syllabic glyphs that represented both consonant and vowel together, as with Japanese kana. That is, in written Iberian, ga displayed no resemblance to ge, and bi had no connection to bo. This possibly unique writing system is called a "semi-syllabary".

The southeastern script was written right to left, as was the Phoenician alphabet, whereas the northeastern script reversed this to left to right, as in the Greek alphabet.

== Origins ==
The Iberian scripts are classified as Paleohispanic scripts for convenience and based on broad similarities, but their relationships to each other and to neighboring contemporaneous scripts, such as Greco-Iberian, are not firmly established. It is generally accepted that they were derived at least partly from the Greek alphabet and/or Phoenician alphabet, with which they share many similar-looking glyphs. Some researchers conclude that the origin of the northern and southern Iberian scripts ultimately lies solely with the Phoenician alphabet; others believe the Greek alphabet also played a role; others still have suggested influences from Old Italic. It appears that either the glyphs themselves were changed, or that they assumed new values. For example, the southern glyph for /e/ derives from Phoenician ‘ayin or Greek Ο, whereas northern /e/ resembles Phoenician he or Greek Ε, though the letter arguably had the value of /be/ in southern Iberian. However, it is clear that they had a common origin, and the most commonly accepted hypothesis is that the northeastern script derives from the southeastern script.

== See also ==
- Iberian language
- Paleohispanic scripts
- Pre-Roman peoples of the Iberian Peninsula
