= Espanca script =

Paleohispanic alphabet

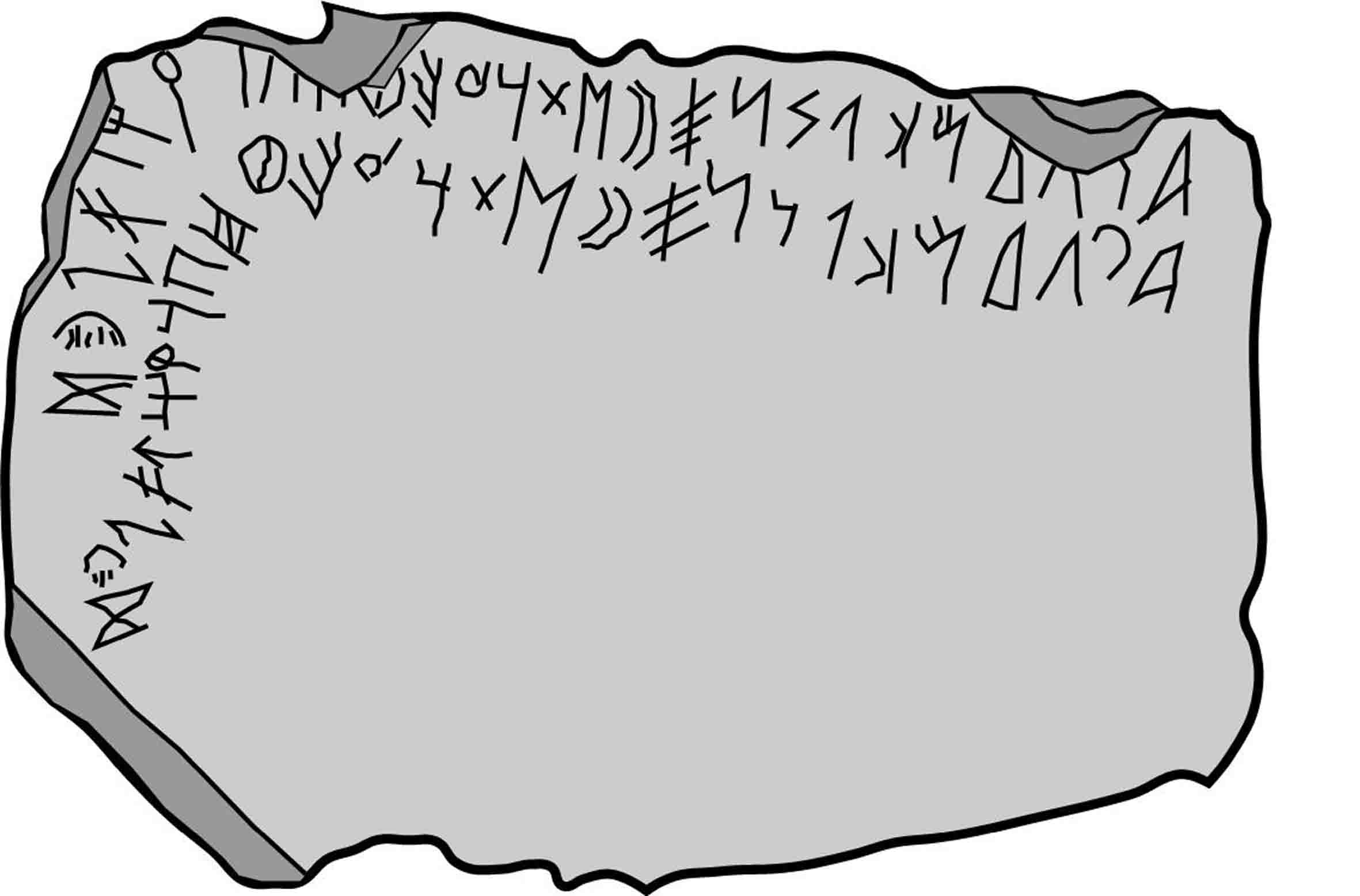
The Espanca script (Castro Verde)

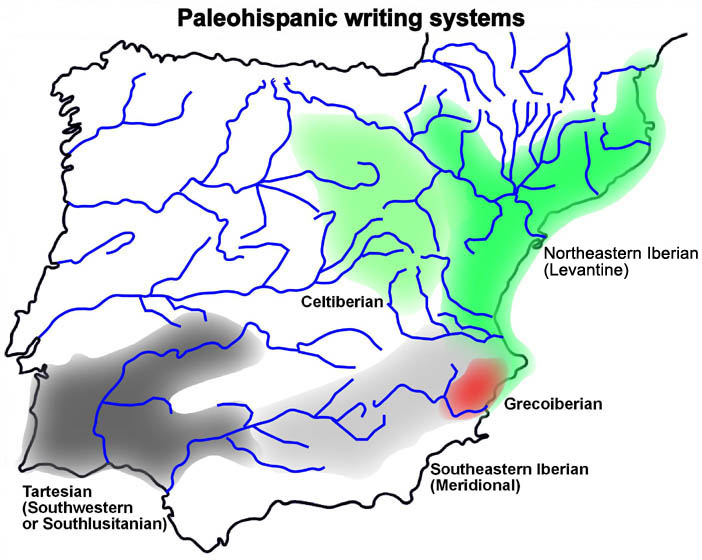
Paleohispanic scripts

The Espanca script (from Castro Verde, Baixo Alentejo, Portugal) is the first signary (alphabetical sequence) known of the Paleohispanic scripts. It is inscribed on a piece of slate, 48×28×2 cm. This alphabet consists of 27 letters written double. The 27 letters in the outer line are written in a better hand than those of the inner line, from which it has been inferred that the slate was a teaching exercise in which a master wrote the alphabet and a student copied it.

The signary does not exactly match any of the known Paleohispanic scripts, but it is clearly related to the southwestern Tartessian script and to the southeastern Iberian script. The first 13 letters match letters of the 22-letter Phoenician alphabet in both shape and relative order: 𐤀 𐤁 𐤂 𐤃 𐤉 𐤊 𐤋 𐤌 𐤍 𐤎 𐤏 𐤔 𐤕 (A B C D I K L M N Ξ O S T). The remaining letters include the other Phoenician letters, slightly out of order: 𐤅 𐤄 𐤈 𐤇 𐤐 𐤑 𐤒 𐤓 𐤆 (U E Θ H P Ϻ Q R Z), supplemented by five letters seemingly original to the Paleohispanic scripts.

The Espanca signary is no longer the only known Paleohispanic signary; in recent years, four more northeastern Iberian signaries have been published: the Castellet de Bernabé signary, the Tos Pelat signary, the Ger signary and the Bolvir signary. Each of them has a particular sequence of signs and none of them match the sequence of signs of the Espanca signary.

Recently, an inscription made on one side of an ostrakon from the site in Villasviejas del Tamuja (Botija, Cáceres) has been identified as a southern Paleohispanic abecedary, because it fits with the seven signs of the central sequence of the Espanca abecedary.

== See also ==
- Pre-Roman peoples of the Iberian Peninsula
- Paleohispanic scripts

== Bibliography ==
- Adiego, Ignasi Javier (1993): «Algunas reflexiones sobre el alfabeto de Espanca y las primitivas escrituras hispánicas», Studia Palaeohispanica et Indogermánica J. Untermann ab Amicis Hispanicis Oblata, pp. 11–22.
- Correa, José Antonio (1993): «El signario de Espanca (Castro Verde) y la escritura tartessia», Lengua y Cultura en la Hispania Prerromana, pp. 521–562.
- Ferrer i Jane Joan (2013): «Els sistemes duals de les escriptures ibèriques», Palaeohispanica 13, pp. 451-479.
- Ferrer i Jané, Joan (e.p.): «El abecedario paleohispánico meridional del ostrakon de Villasviejas del Tamuja (Botija, Cáceres)», en F. Hernández Hernández y A. M. Martín Bravo (eds.) Las Necrópolis de El Romazal y el Conjunto Arqueológico de Villasviejas del Tamuja (Cáceres).
- Hoz, Javier De (1996): «El origen de las escrituras paleohispánicas quince años después», La Hispania prerromana, pp. 171–206.
- Untermann, Jürgen. (1996): «La escritura tartesia entre griegos y fenicios, y lo que nos enseña el alfabeto de Espanca», Arqueología Hoje 2.
- Velaza, Javier (2012): «Inscripciones paleohispánicas con signarios: formas y funciones», E.L.E.A. 12, pp. 151-165.
