= Tartessian =

Tartessian may refer to:

- an ancient civilization based in Tartessos in modern-day Andalusia
- Tartessian language
- Southwest Paleohispanic script or Tartessian script
