= Paleohispanic =

Paleohispanic may refer to:

- Paleohispanic languages
- Paleohispanic scripts
