= Celtiberian script =

Ancient writing system from the Iberian peninsula

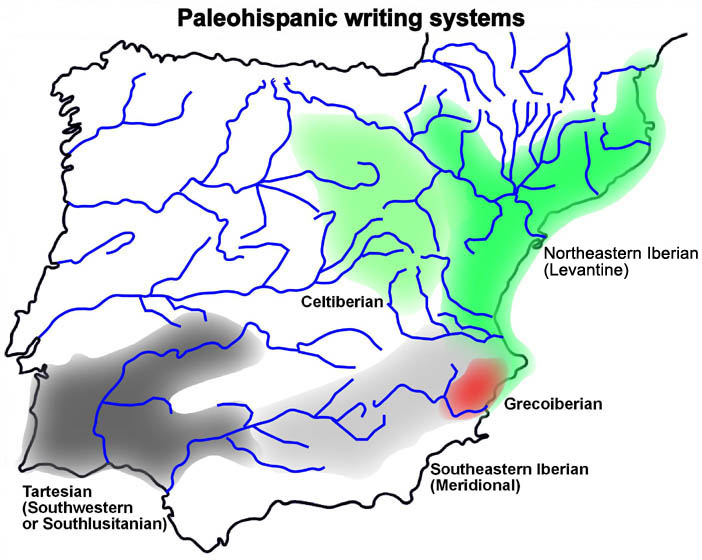
The Celtiberian script (light green) among other Paleohispanic scripts.

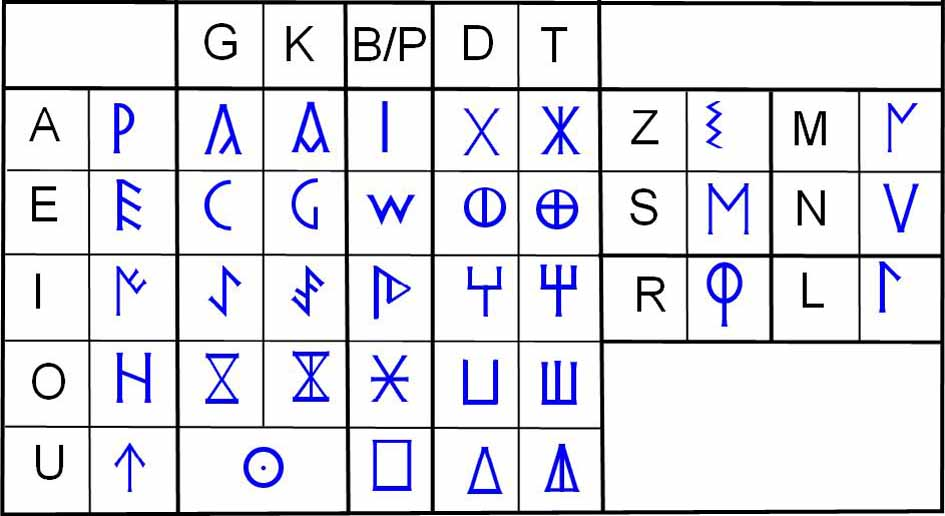
A western Celtiberian signary (Based on Ferrer i Jané 2005)

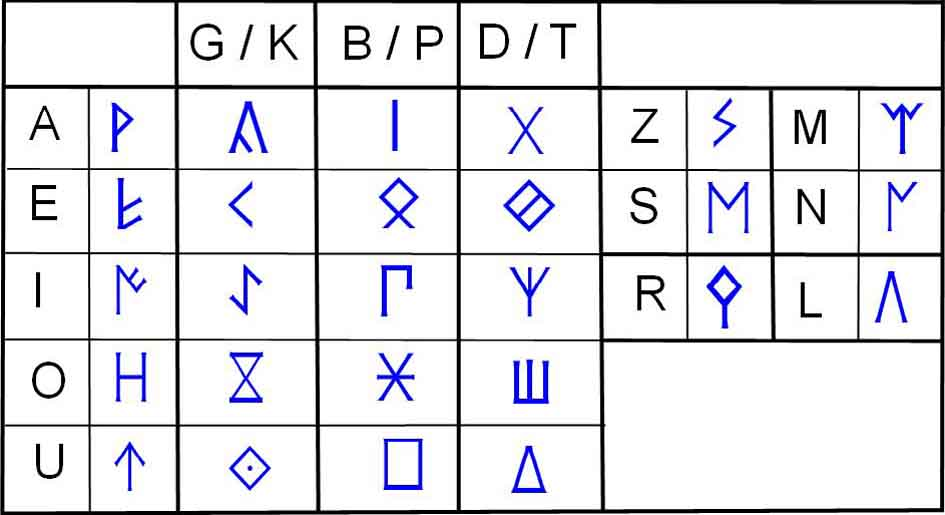
An eastern Celtiberian signary

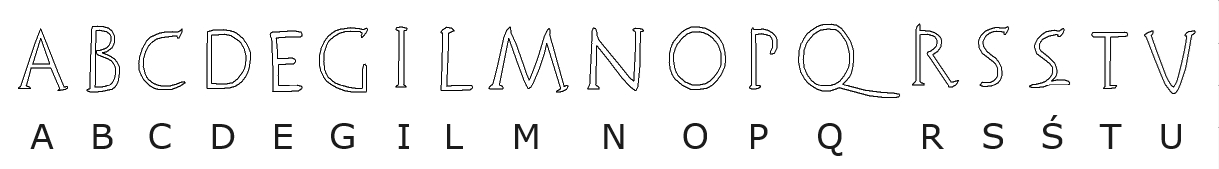
Celtiberian latin alphabet

The Celtiberian script is a Paleohispanic script that was the main writing system of the Celtiberian language, an extinct Continental Celtic language, which was also occasionally written using the Latin alphabet. This script is a direct adaptation of the northeastern Iberian script, the most frequently used of the Iberian scripts.

== Origins ==
All the Paleohispanic scripts, with the exception of the Greco-Iberian alphabet, share a common distinctive typological characteristic: they represent syllabic values for the stop consonants, and monophonemic values for the rest of consonants and vowels. They are thus to be classed as neither alphabets nor syllabaries; rather, they are mixed scripts normally identified as semi-syllabaries. There is no agreement about how the Paleohispanic semi-syllabaries originated; some researchers conclude that they derive only from the Phoenician alphabet, while others believe the Greek alphabet was also involved.

== Typology and variants ==
The basic Celtiberian signary contains 26 signs rather than the 28 signs of the original model; the Celtiberians omitted one of the two rhotic and one of the three nasals of the northeastern Iberian script. The remaining 26 signs comprised 5 vowels, 15 syllabic signs and 6 consonants (one lateral, two sibilants, one rhotic and two nasals). The sign equivalent to Iberian s is transcribed as z in Celtiberian, because it is assumed that it sometimes expresses the fricative result of an ancient dental stop (d), while the Iberian sign ś is transcribed as s. As for the use of the nasal signs, there are two variants of the Celtiberian script: In the eastern variant, the excluded nasal sign was the Iberian sign ḿ, while in the western variant, the excluded nasal sign was the Iberian sign m. This is interpreted as evidence of a double origin of the Celtiberian script. Like one variant of the northeastern Iberian script, the western variant of Celtiberian shows evidence of having allowed the voiced stops g and d to be differentiated from their respective voiceless counterparts, k and t, by adding a stroke to the voiceless signs. This is known as the ‘dual system’ in Paleohispanic scripts, which otherwise do not distinguish between pairs of voiceless and voiced stops (p:b, t:d and k:g).

== Location of findings ==
The Celtiberian inscriptions have been found mainly in the Ebro valley and near the sources of the Tagus and Douro rivers, where Roman and Greek sources place the Celtiberian people. The Celtiberian inscriptions were made on different types of objects (silver and bronze coins, ceramic receptacles, bronze plaques and tesseras, amphores, stones, spindle-whorls, etc.). There are just under two hundred surviving inscriptions, one of which is exceptionally long: the third Botorrita bronze plaque (Zaragoza) with more than three thousand signs containing a census of nearly 250 people. Almost always the direction of the writing is left to right. The fact that nearly all the Celtiberian inscriptions were found out of archaeological context does not allow a precise chronology to be established, but it seems that the earliest inscriptions in the Celtiberian script date from the 2nd century BCE while the latest ones date from the 1st century BCE.

Celtiberian inscriptions

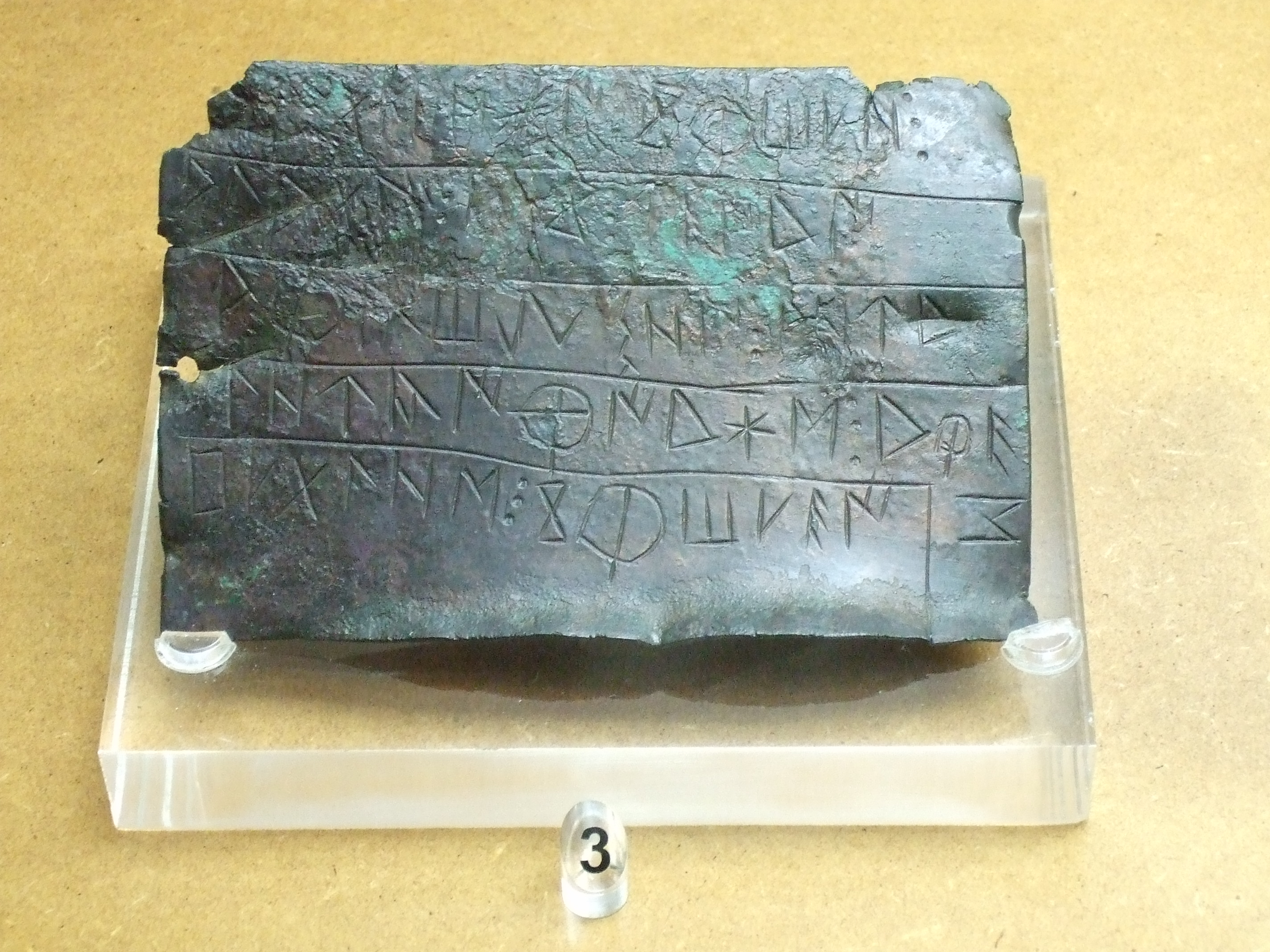
Cortono plaque. Unknown provenance. Western signary.

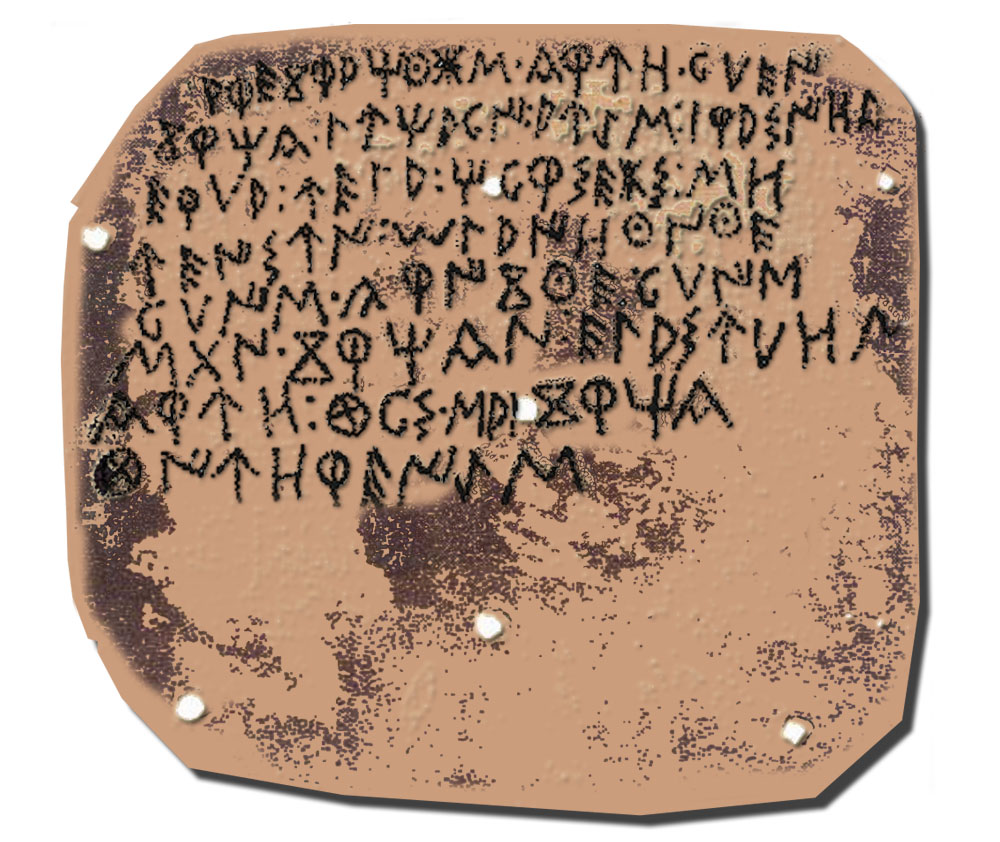
Luzaga plaque (Guadalajara). Western signary.

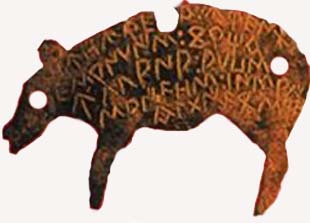
Uxama tessera (Osma, Soria. Western signary.

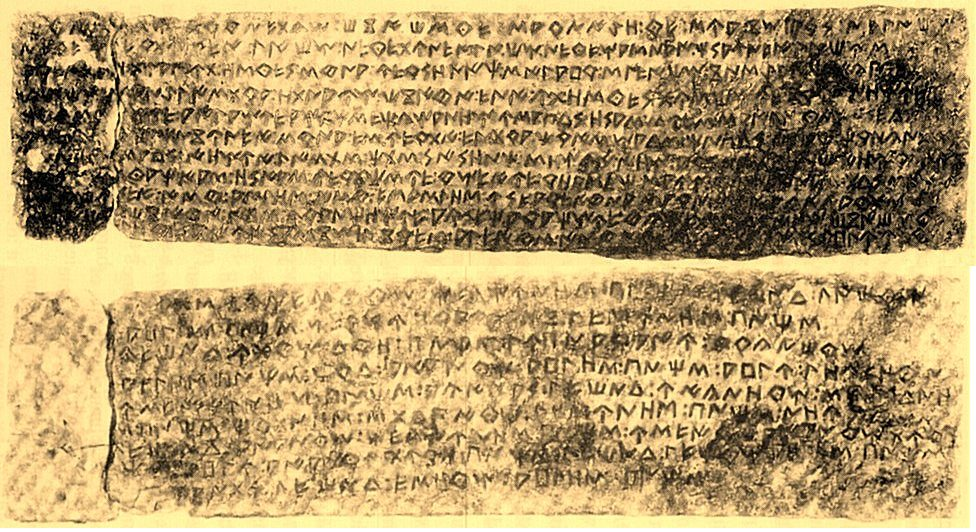
First Botorrita plaque (Zaragoza). Eastern signary.

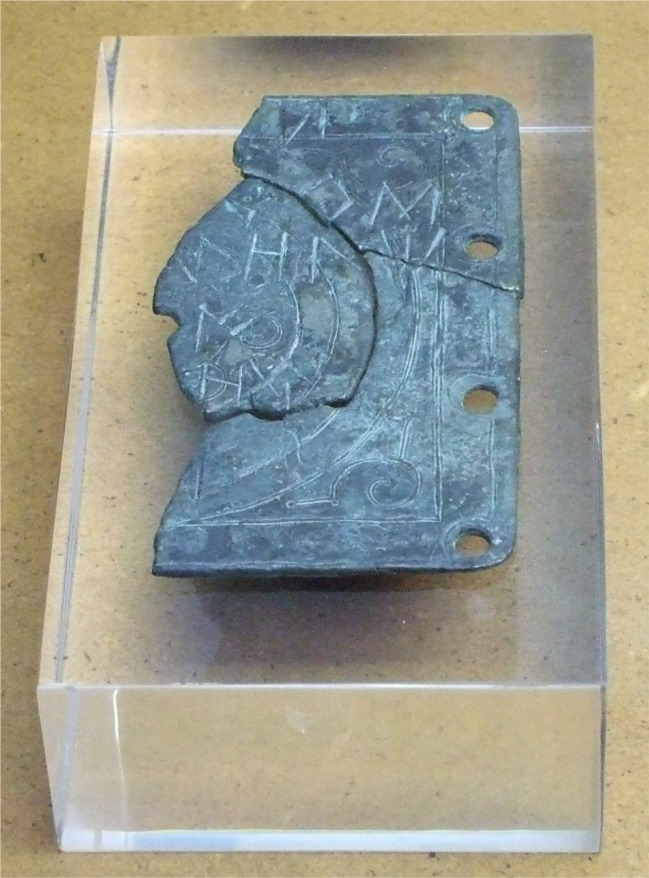
Another Botorrita plaque (Zaragoza). Eastern signary.

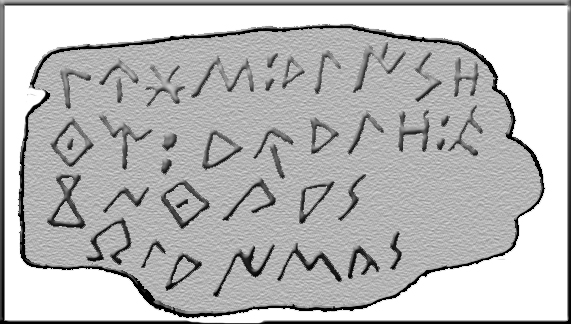
Fröhner tessera. Unknown provenance. Eastern signary.

== See also ==
- Celtiberian language
- Greco-Iberian alphabet
- Iberian scripts
- Paleohispanic scripts
  - Northeastern Iberian script
  - Southeastern Iberian script
  - Tartessian script
- Paleohispanic languages

== Bibliography ==
- Ferrer i Jané, Joan (2005): «Novetats sobre el sistema dual de diferenciació gràfica de les oclusives sordes i sonores», Palaeohispanica 5, pp. 957–982.
- Hoz, Javier de (2005): «La lengua y la escritura celtibéricas», Celtiberos. Tras la estela de Numancia, pp. 417–426.
- Jordán, Carlos (2004): Celtibérico, Zaragoza.
- Jordán, Carlos (2005): «¿Sistema dual de escritura en celtibérico?», Palaeohispanica 5, pp. 1013–1030.
- Rodríguez Ramos, Jesús (1997): «Sobre el origen de la escritura celtibérica», Kalathos 16, pp. 189–197.
- Untermann, Jürgen (1997): Monumenta Linguarum Hispanicarum. IV Die tartessischen, keltiberischen und lusitanischen Inschriften, Wiesbaden.
- Schmoll, Ulrich (1960) : «Die iberischen und keltiberischen Nasalzeichen», KZ 76, 280-295.
- Villar, Francisco (1993): «Las silibantes en celtibérico», Lengua y cultura en la Hispania prerromana, pp. 773–812.
- Villar, Francisco (1995): Estudios de celtibérico y toponimia prerromana, Salamanca.

=== Further reading ===
- Blanco, António Bellido, Sobre la escritura entre los Vacceos, in ZEPHYRUS – revista de prehistoria y arqueologia, vol. LXIX, Enero-Junio 2012, Ediciones Universidad Salamanca, pp. 129–147. ISSN 0514-7336
