= Northeastern Iberian script =

Writing system

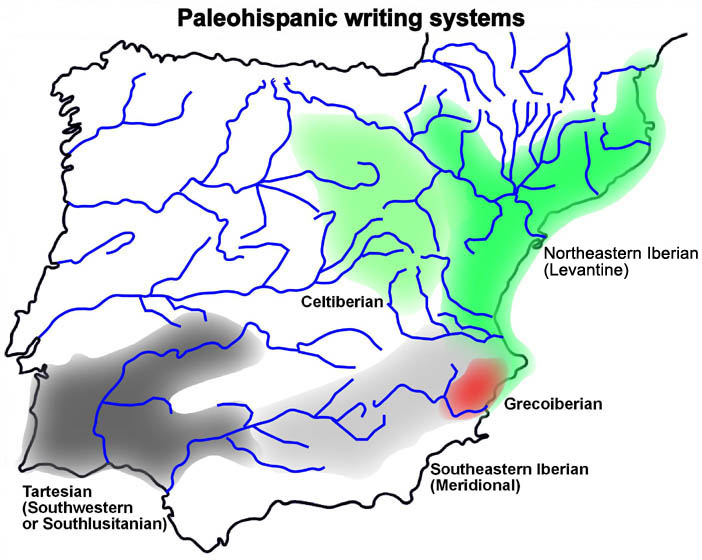
Northeastern Iberian script in the context of Paleohispanic scripts

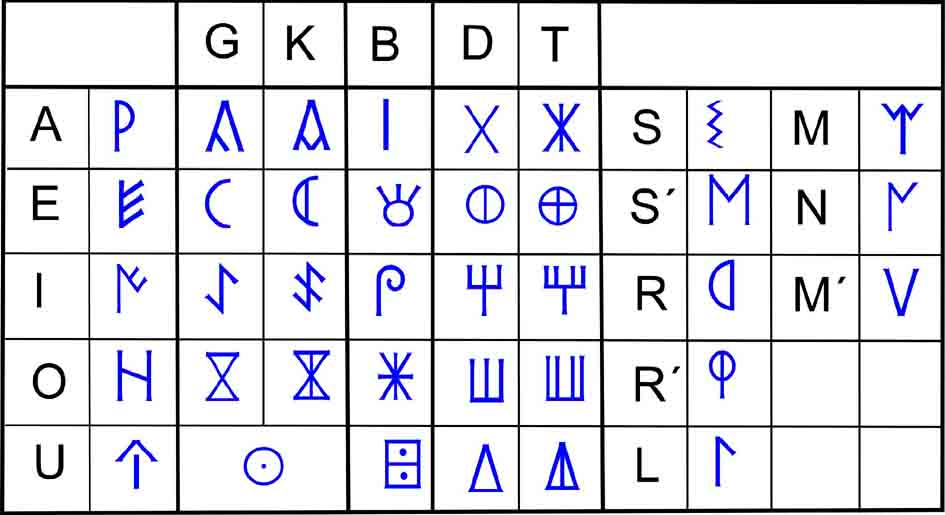
A northeastern dual Iberian signary (based on Ferrer i Jané 2005)

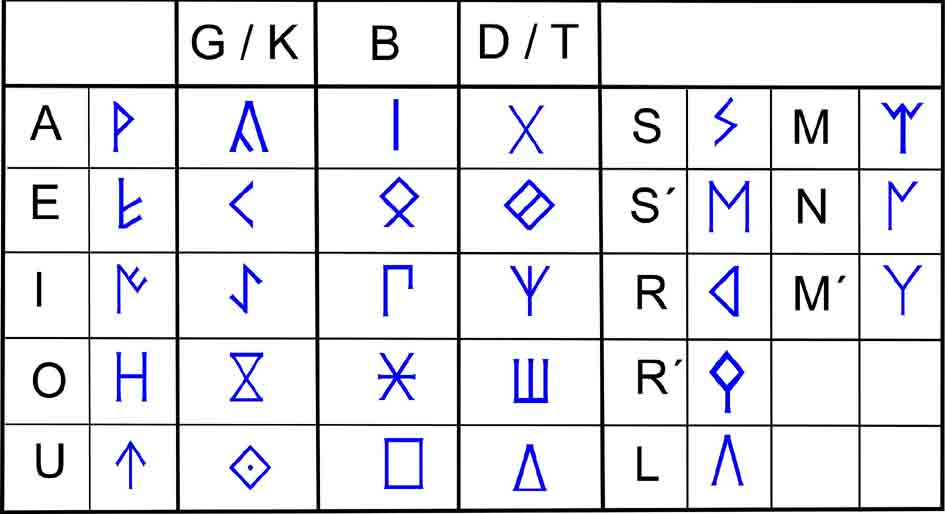
A northeastern non-dual Iberian signary.

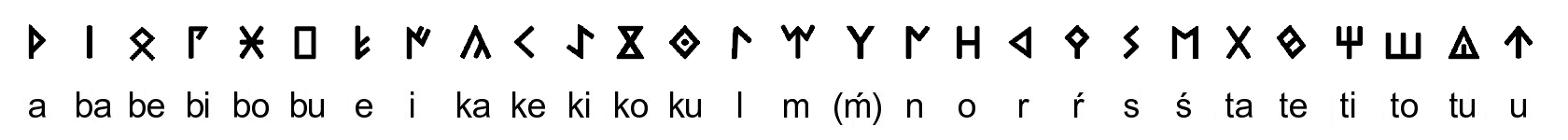
Northern Palaeohispanic Script

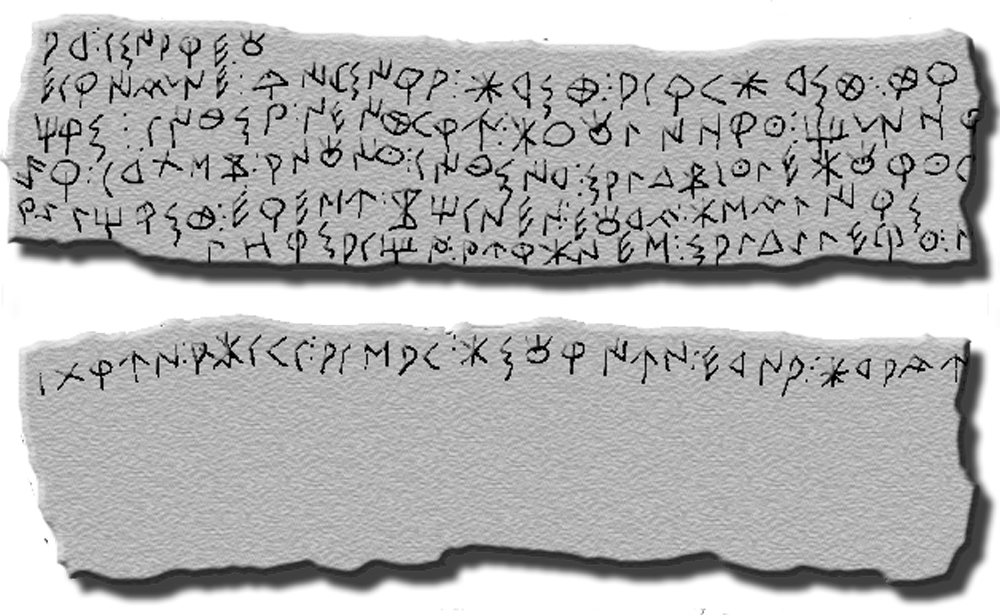
Lead plaque from Ullastret using the northeastern dual signary.

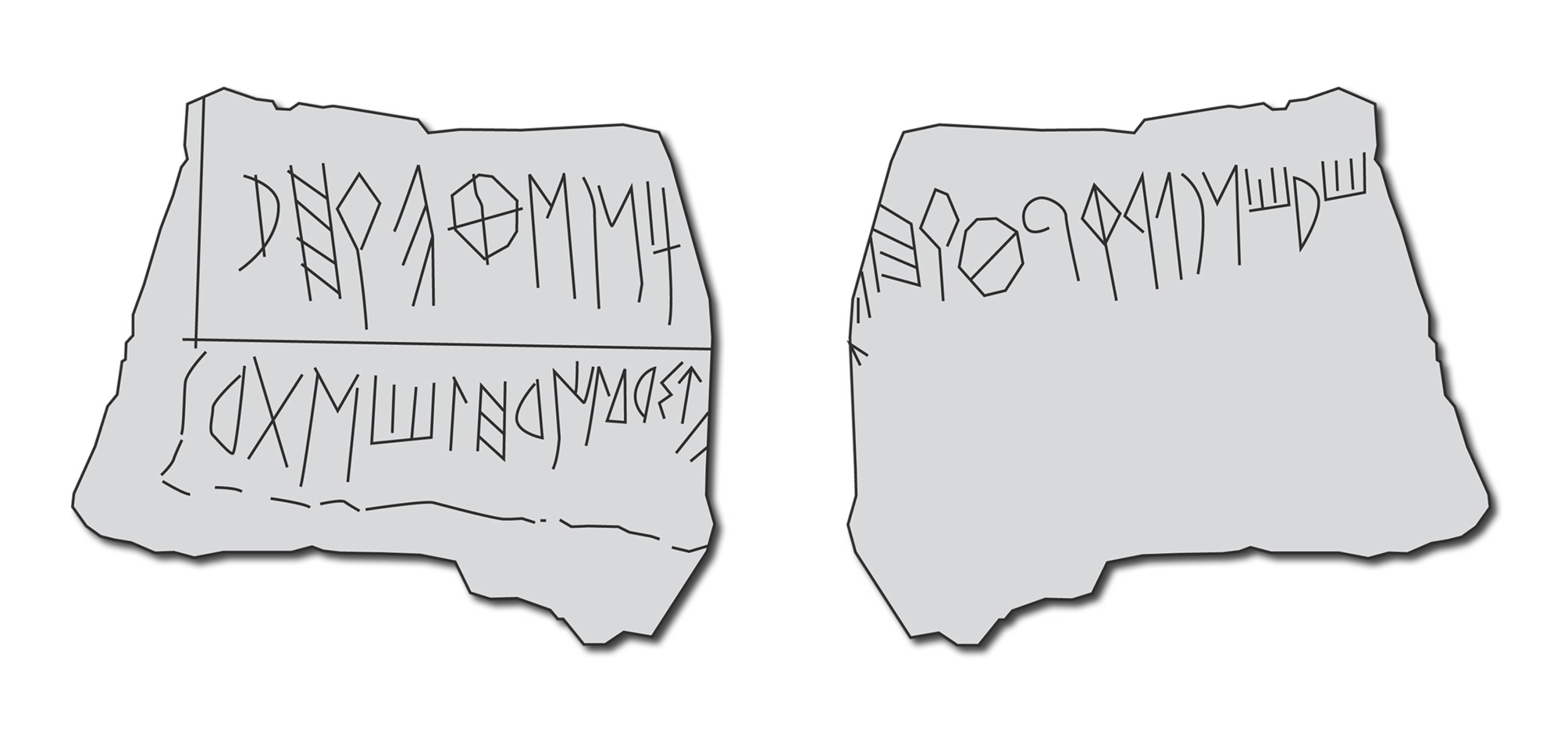
Lead plaque from Penya del Moro mountain (Sant Just Desvern) using the northeastern dual signary

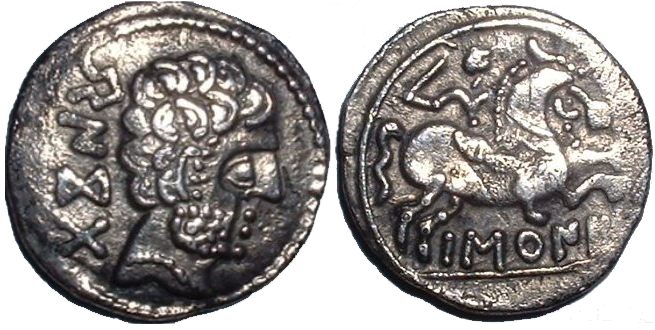
Iberian coin, probably from Navarre with the legend benkota/baskunes using the northeastern non-dual signary

The Northeastern Iberian script, also known as Levantine Iberian or simply Iberian, was the primary means of written expression for the Iberian language. It has also been used to write Proto-Basque, as evidenced by the Hand of Irulegi. The Iberian language is also represented by the Southeastern Iberian script and the Greco-Iberian alphabet. In understanding the relationship between the northeastern and southeastern Iberian scripts, some note that they are two distinct scripts with different values assigned to the same signs. However, they share a common origin, and the most widely accepted hypothesis is that the northeastern Iberian script was derived from the southeastern Iberian script. Some researchers have concluded that it is linked solely to the Phoenician alphabet, while others believe that the Greek alphabet also played a role.

== Typology and variants ==
All of the Paleohispanic scripts, with the exception of the Greco-Iberian alphabet, share a common distinctive typological characteristic: they represent syllabic values for the occlusives and monophonemic values for the other consonants and vowels. In this writing system, they are neither alphabets nor syllabaries; rather, they are mixed scripts that are typically identified as semi-syllabaries. The basic signary (non-dual) contains 28 signs: 5 vowels, 15 syllabic signs, and 8 consonantal signs (including one lateral, two sibilants, two rhotics, and three nasals).

The northeastern script was nearly deciphered in 1922 by Manuel Gómez-Moreno Martínez, who systematically linked the syllabic signs to their occlusive values. This decipherment was based on the existence of a large number of coin legends (some bearing Latin inscriptions) that could easily be associated with ancient place names known from Roman and Greek sources.

There are two variants of the northeastern Iberian script: the dual variant, which is almost exclusive to ancient inscriptions from the 4th and 3rd centuries BCE, is characterized by the use of a dual system. This system, discovered by Joan Maluquer de Motes in 1968, allows for the differentiation of occlusive signs (dentals and velars) between voiced and unvoiced by the addition of an extra stroke. The simple sign represents the voiced value, while the complex sign represents the unvoiced value. The non-dual variant is primarily found in modern inscriptions from the 2nd and 1st centuries BCE.

== Location of findings ==
The inscriptions that use the northeastern Iberian script have been found primarily in the northeastern quadrant of the Iberian Peninsula, largely along the coast from Roussillon to Alicante, as well as deep into the Ebro Valley. These inscriptions have been discovered on various types of objects, including silver and bronze coins, silver and ceramic vessels, lead plaques, mosaics, amphorae, stones (steles), spindle whorls, and more. Together, these represent 95% of the total finds (over 2,000 items), and nearly all the scripts were written from left to right. The oldest northeastern Iberian inscriptions date to the 4th or possibly the 5th century BCE, while the more modern ones date from the end of the 1st century BCE or perhaps the beginning of the 1st century CE.

In recent years, four northeastern Iberian abecedaries or signaries have been published: the Castellet de Bernabé signary, the Tos Pelat signary, the Ger signary, and the Bolvir signary, all of which belong to the dual variant of the script.

== See also ==
- Greco-Iberian alphabet
- Iberian scripts
- Paleohispanic scripts
  - Celtiberian script
  - Southeastern Iberian script
  - Tartessian script
- Paleohispanic languages
- Pre-Roman peoples of the Iberian Peninsula

== Bibliography ==
- Correa, José Antonio (1992): «Representación gráfica de la oposición de sonoridad en las oclusivas ibéricas (semisilabario levantino)», AION 14, pp. 253–292.
- Ferrer i Jané, Joan (2005): Novetats sobre el sistema dual de diferenciació gràfica de les oclusives sordes i sonores, Palaeohispanica 5, pp. 957–982.
- Ferrer i Jane Joan (2013): «Els sistemes duals de les escriptures ibèriques», Palaeohispanica 13, pp. 451-479.
- Gómez-Moreno, Manuel (1922): «De Epigrafia ibérica: el plomo de Alcoy», Revista de filología española 9, pp. 34–66.
- Hoz, Javier de (1985): «El nuevo plomo inscrito de Castell y el problema de las oposiciones de sonoridad en ibérico», Symbolae Ludouico Mitxelena septuagenario oblatae, pp. 443–453.
- Maluquer de Motes, Joan (1968): Epigrafía prelatina de la península ibérica, Barcelona.
- Quintanilla, Alberto (1993): «Sobre la notación en la escritura ibérica del modo de articulación de las consonantes oclusivas», Studia Palaeohispanica et Indogermánica J. Untermann ab Amicis Hispanicis Oblata, pp. 239–250.
- Rodríguez Ramos, Jesús (2004): Análisis de epigrafía íbera, Vitoria-Gasteiz.
- Untermann, Jürgen (1990): Monumenta Linguarum Hispanicarum. III Die iberischen Inschriften aus Spanien, Wiesbaden.
- Velaza, Javier (1996): Epigrafía y lengua ibéricas, Barcelona.
