= Southeastern Iberian script =

Writing system

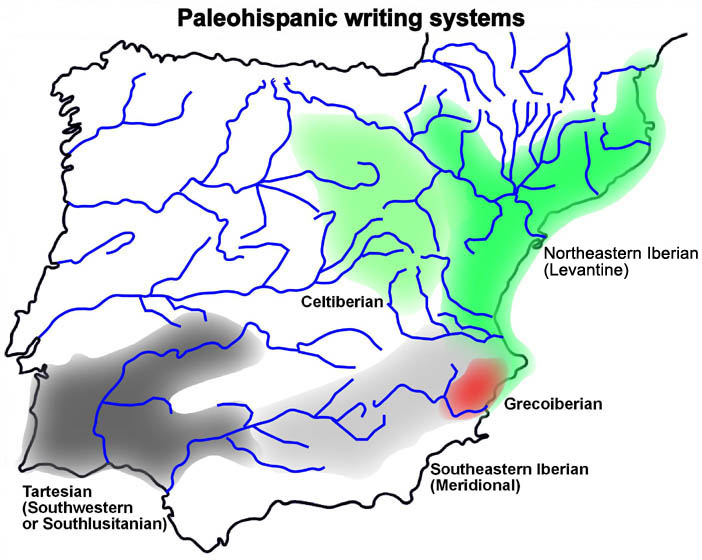
Southeastern Iberian script in the context of Paleohispanic scripts

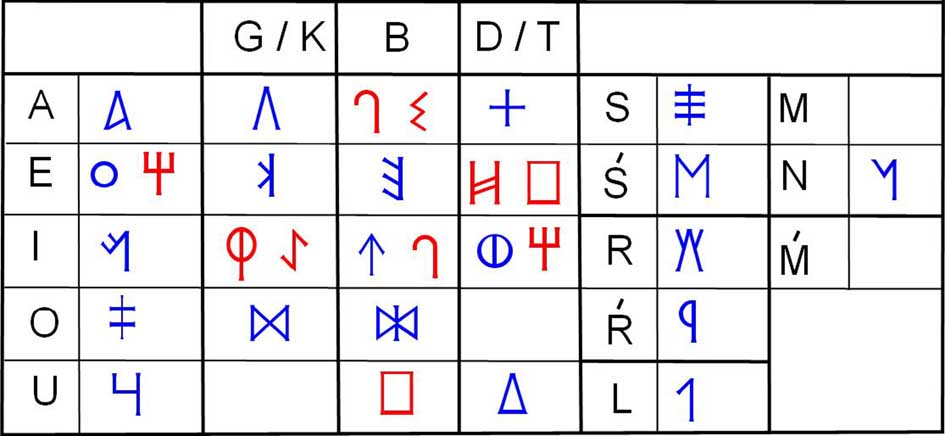
A possible southeastern Iberian signary (Correa 2004).

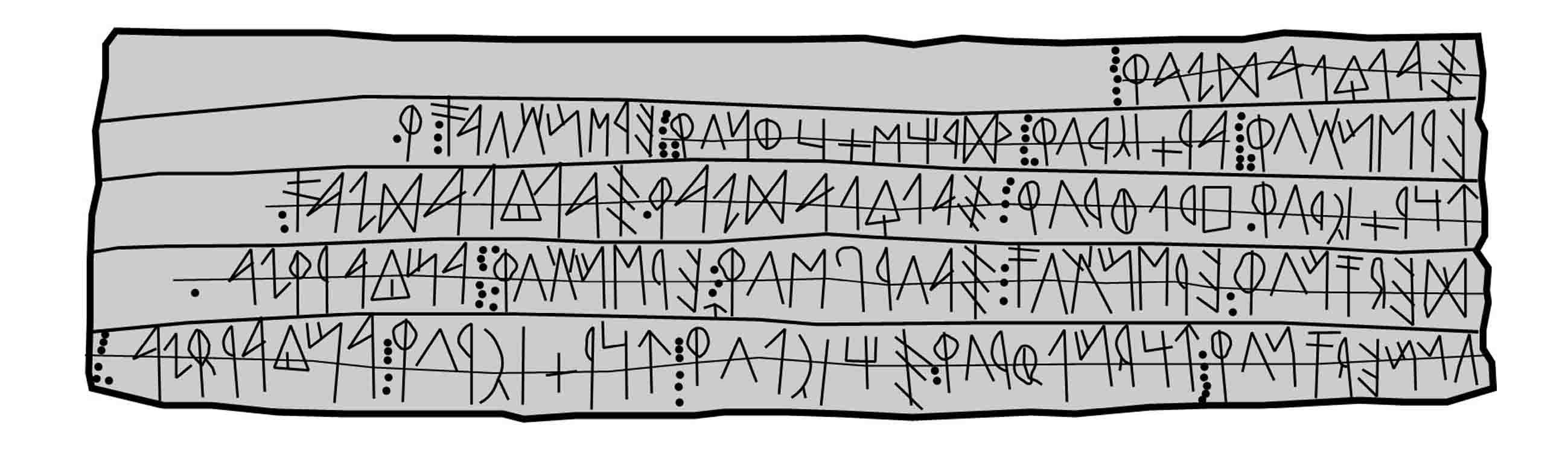
Lead plaque from La Bastida de les Alcuses (Moixent)

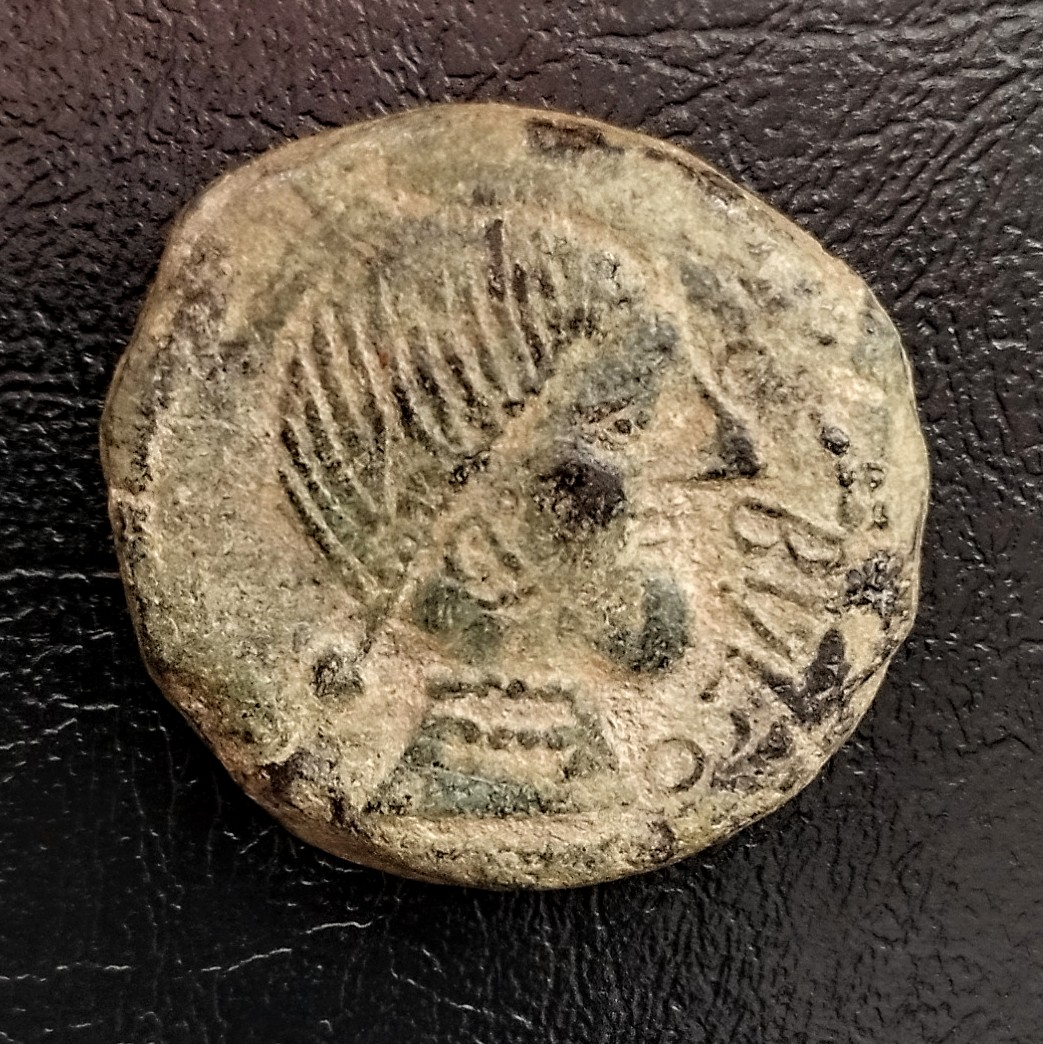
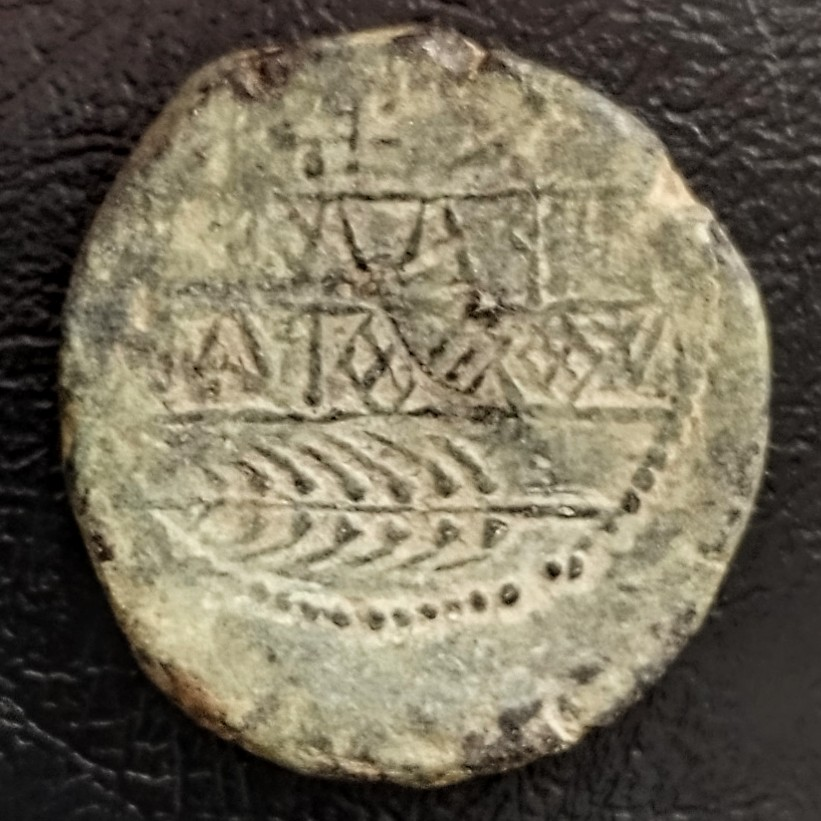
As of Obulco, 175 BC - 126 BC.

On this coin, while the obverse has a legend "OBVLCO" in Latin script, the reverse reads:

"ORCaILV" and:

"NTuSTuLDuCo" (names of local magistrates) in Iberian script.

The southeastern Iberian script, also known as Meridional Iberian, was one of the means of written expression for the Iberian language, which was primarily written in the northeastern Iberian script and, to a lesser extent, by the Greco-Iberian alphabet. In understanding the relationship between the northeastern and southeastern Iberian scripts, some note that they are two distinct scripts with different values assigned to the same signs. However, they share a common origin, and the most widely accepted hypothesis is that the northeastern Iberian script was derived from the southeastern Iberian script.

In fact, the southeastern Iberian script is very similar to the Southwestern script, which is used to represent an unknown language typically referred to as Tartessian, both in terms of the shape of the signs and their values. The main difference is that the southeastern Iberian script does not exhibit the vocalic redundancy found in the syllabic signs of the northeastern Iberian script.

Unlike the northeastern Iberian script, the decipherment of the southeastern Iberian script is not yet complete, as there are a significant number of signs on which scholars have not yet reached a consensus. Although it is believed that the southeastern Iberian script does not have a system to differentiate between voiced and unvoiced occlusives, a recent paper (Ferrer i Jané 2010) argues for the existence of a dual system in the southeastern Iberian script as well.

== Typology and variants ==
All the Paleohispanic scripts, with the exception of the Greco-Iberian alphabet, share a common distinctive typological characteristic: they represent syllabic values for the occlusives and monophonemic values for the other consonants and vowels. From the perspective of writing systems, they are neither alphabets nor syllabaries; rather, they are mixed scripts that are typically identified as semi-syllabaries. There is no consensus on how the Paleohispanic scripts originated; some researchers conclude that their origin is linked solely to the Phoenician alphabet, while others believe that the Greek alphabet also exerted some influence.

== Location of findings ==
The inscriptions that use the southeastern Iberian script have been found primarily in the southeastern quadrant of the Iberian Peninsula, including eastern Andalusia, Murcia, Albacete, Alicante, and Valencia. These inscriptions were made on various types of objects, such as silver and bronze coins, silver and ceramic vessels, lead plaques, stones, and more. However, they number around 50, representing only about 2% of the total finds. Among them are the lead plaque from Gador (Almería) and the lead plaque from La Bastida de les Alcuses (Moixent, Valencia). The inscriptions in this script almost always follow a right-to-left direction of writing. The oldest inscriptions in the southeastern Iberian script date to the 4th century BCE, while the most recent ones date from the end of the 2nd century BCE.

== See also ==
- Greco-Iberian alphabet
- Iberian scripts
- Paleohispanic scripts
  - Celtiberian script
  - Northeastern Iberian script
  - Tartessian script
- Paleohispanic languages
- Pre-Roman peoples of the Iberian Peninsula

== Bibliography ==
- Correa, José Antonio (2004): «Los semisilabarios ibéricos: algunas cuestiones», ELEA 4, pp. 75–98.
- Ferrer i Jané, Joan (2010): «El sistema dual de l'escriptura ibèrica sud-oriental», Veleia 27, pp. 69–113.
- Hoz, Javier de (1989): «El desarrollo de la escritura y las lenguas de la zona meridional», Tartessos, pp. 523–587.
- Rodríguez Ramos, Jesús (2002): «La escritura ibérica meridional», Zephyrus 55, pp. 231–245.
- Untermann, Jürgen (1990): Monumenta Linguarum Hispanicarum. III Die iberischen Inschriften aus Spanien, Wiesbaden.
- Velaza, Javier (1996): Epigrafía y lengua ibéricas, Barcelona.
