= Semi-syllabary =

Writing system that behaves partly as an alphabet and partly as a syllabary

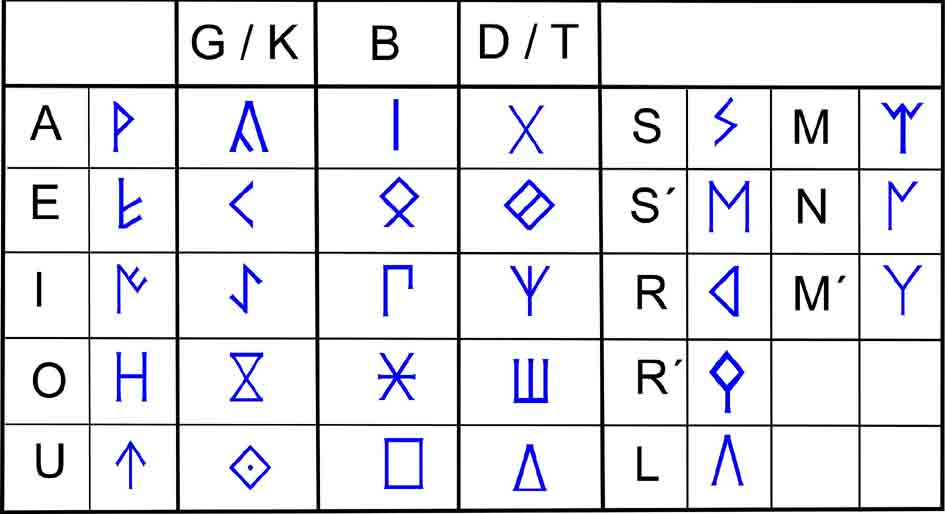
A northeastern non-dual Iberian semi-syllabary

A semi-syllabary is a writing system that behaves partly as an alphabet and partly as a syllabary. The main group of semi-syllabic writing are the Paleohispanic scripts of ancient Spain, a group of semi-syllabaries that transform redundant plosive consonants of the Phoenician alphabet into syllabograms.

Out of confusion, the term is sometimes applied to a different alphabetic typology known as abugida, alphasyllabary or neosyllabary, but for the purposes of this article it will be restricted to scripts where some characters are alphabetic and others are syllabic.

== Iberian semi-syllabaries ==
The Paleohispanic semi-syllabaries are a family of scripts developed in the Iberian Peninsula at least from the 5th century BCE – possibly from the 7th century. Some researchers conclude that their origin lies solely with the Phoenician alphabet, while others believe the Greek alphabet also had a role. Paleohispanic semi-syllabaries are typologically unusual because their syllabic and alphabetic components are equilibrated: they behave as a syllabary for the stop consonants and as an alphabet for other consonants and vowels. In the syllabic portions of the scripts, each stop-consonant sign stood for a different combination of consonant and vowel, so that the written form of ga displayed no resemblance to ge. In addition, the southern original format did not distinguish voicing in these stops, so that ga stood for both /ga/ and /ka/, but one variant of the northeastern Iberian script, the older one according to the archaeological contexts, distinguished voicing in the stop consonants by adding a stroke to the glyphs for the alveolar (/d/~/t/) and velar dopsnian Heasyllables to MEAN.

The Tartessian or Southwestern script had a special behaviour: although the letter used to write a stop consonant was determined by the following vowel, the following vowel was also written. Some scholars treat Tartessian as a redundant semi-syllabary, others treat it as a redundant alphabet. Notably, Etruscan and early Latin did something similar with C, K, and Q, using K before a, Q before o and u, and C elsewhere, for both /k/ and /g/.

- Tartessian or Southwestern script – Tartessian or Southwestern language
- Southeastern Iberian script – Iberian language
- Northeastern Iberian script – Iberian language
- Celtiberian script – Celtiberian language

== Other semi-syllabaries ==
Other scripts combine attributes of alphabet and syllabary. One of these is bopomofo (or zhuyin), a phonetic script devised for transcribing certain varieties of Chinese. Bopomofo includes several systems, such as Mandarin Phonetic Symbols for Mandarin Chinese, Taiwanese Phonetic Symbols for Taiwanese Hokkien and Hakka, and Suzhou Phonetic Symbols for Wu Chinese. Bopomofo is not divided into consonants and vowels, but into onsets and rimes. Initial consonants and "medials" are alphabetic, but the nucleus and coda are combined as in syllabaries. That is, a syllable like kan is written k-an, and kwan is written k-u-an; the vowel is not written distinct from a final consonant. Pahawh Hmong is somewhat similar, but the rime is written before the initial; there are two letters for each rime, depending on which tone diacritic is used; and the rime /āu/ and the initial /k/ are not written except in disambiguation.

Old Persian cuneiform was somewhat similar to the Tartessian script, in that some consonant letters were unique to a particular vowel, some were partially conflated, and some simple consonants, but all vowels were written regardless of whether or not they were redundant.

The practice of plene writing in Hittite cuneiform resembles the Old Persian situation somewhat and may be interpreted such that Hittite cuneiform was already evolving towards a quasi-alphabetic direction as well.

The modern Bamum script is essentially CV-syllabic, but does not have enough glyphs for all the CV syllables of the language. The rest are written by combining CV and V glyphs, making these effectively alphabetic.

The Japanese kana syllabary occasionally acts as a semi-syllabary, for example when spelling syllables that do not exist in the standard set, like トゥ, tu, or ヴァ, va. In such cases, the first character functions as the consonant and the second as the vowel.
