= Paleohispanic scripts =

Writing systems used before the Latin alphabet in Iberia

- Script type: Semisyllabary
- Period: c. 700 or 500–100 BC
- Region: Iberian Peninsula and Aquitaine (southern France)
- Languages: Aquitanian, Celtiberian, Gallaecian, Iberian, Lusitanian, Sorothaptic, Tartessian

Related scripts
- Parent systems: Egyptian hieroglyphs: Proto-Sinaitic; Phoenician script; Paleohispanic scripts
- Child systems: Southwestern script; Southeastern Iberian script; Northeastern Iberian script; Celtiberian script
- Sister systems: Greco-Iberian alphabet

ISO 15924
- ISO 15924: Nphn (146), N Palaeohispanic Sphn (147), S Palaeohispanic

Unicode
- Unicode range: U+10200 to U+1023F Northern Palaeohispanic, U+10240 to U+1027F Southern Palaeohispanic

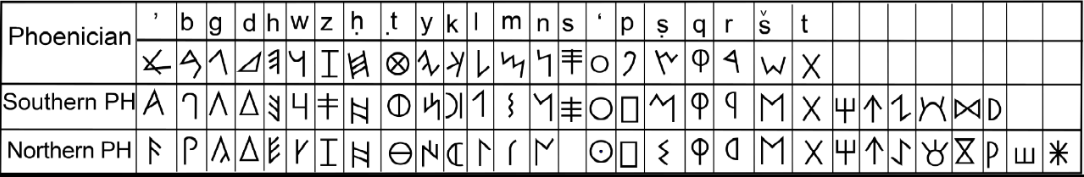
Phoenician and Paleohispanic scripts

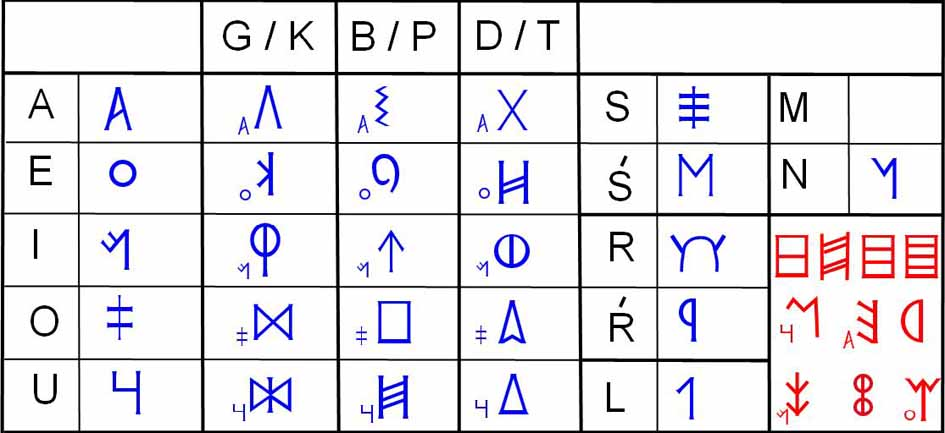
A possible southwestern signary (based on Rodríguez Ramos 2000).

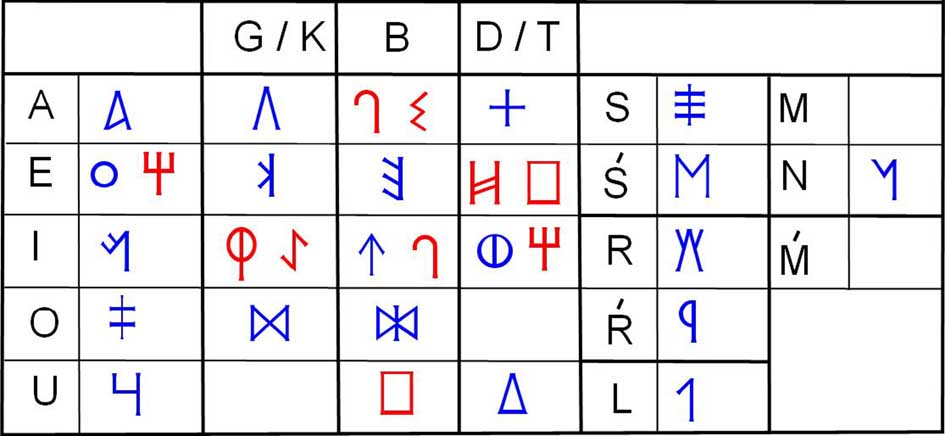
Possible values of the southeastern Iberian signary (based on Correa 2004). Signs in red are the most debatable.

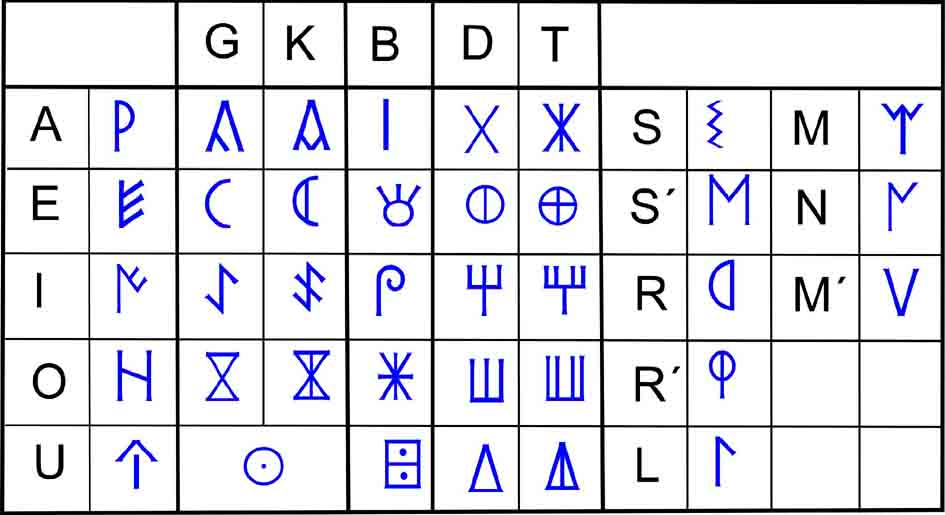
The proposed 'dual' variant of northeastern Iberian signary (based on Ferrer i Jané 2005).

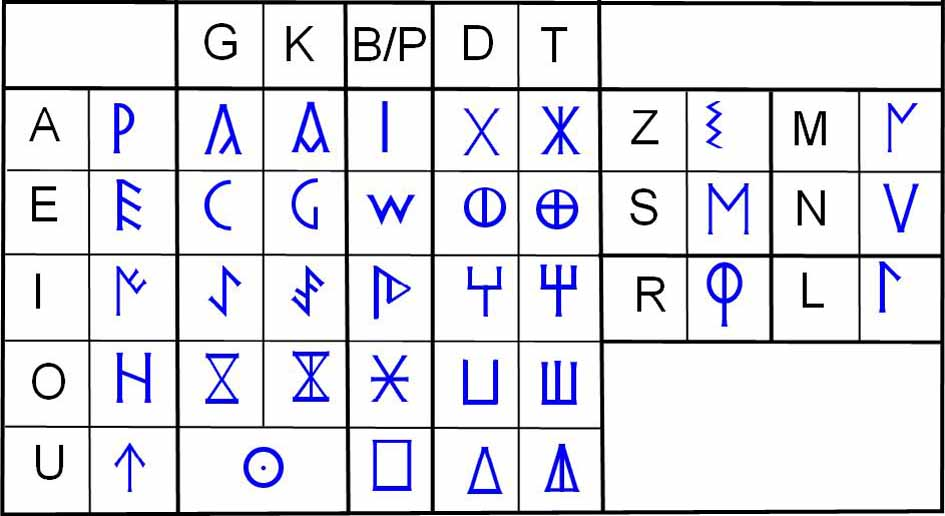
A western Celtiberian signary (based on Ferrer i Jané 2005).

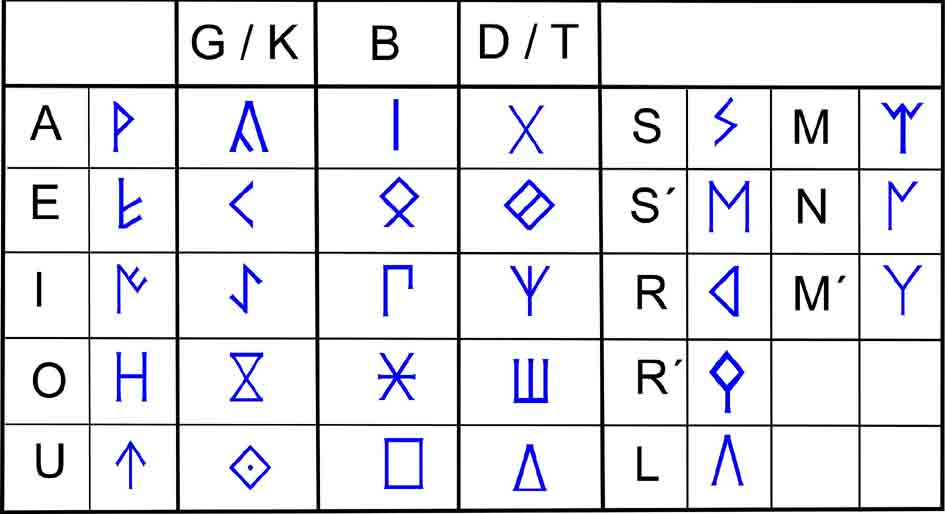
A northeastern Iberian signary (not dual).

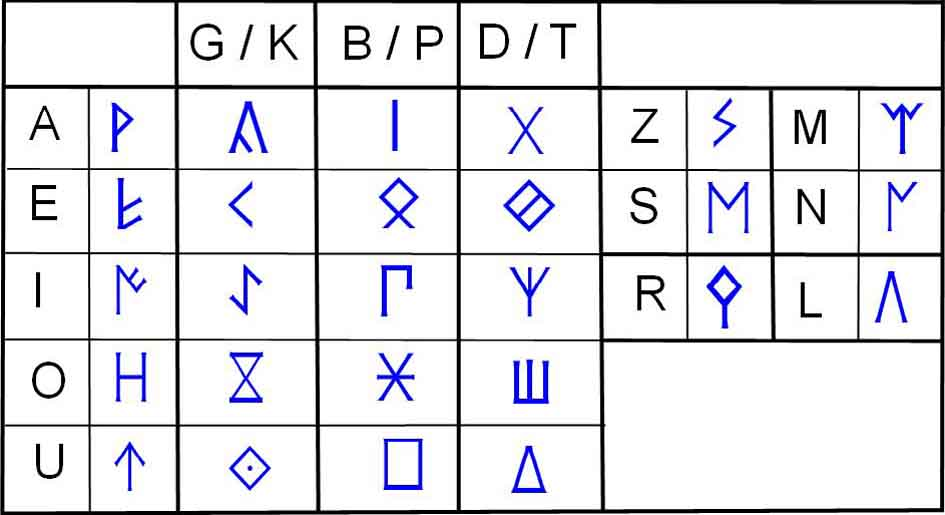
An eastern Celtiberian signary.

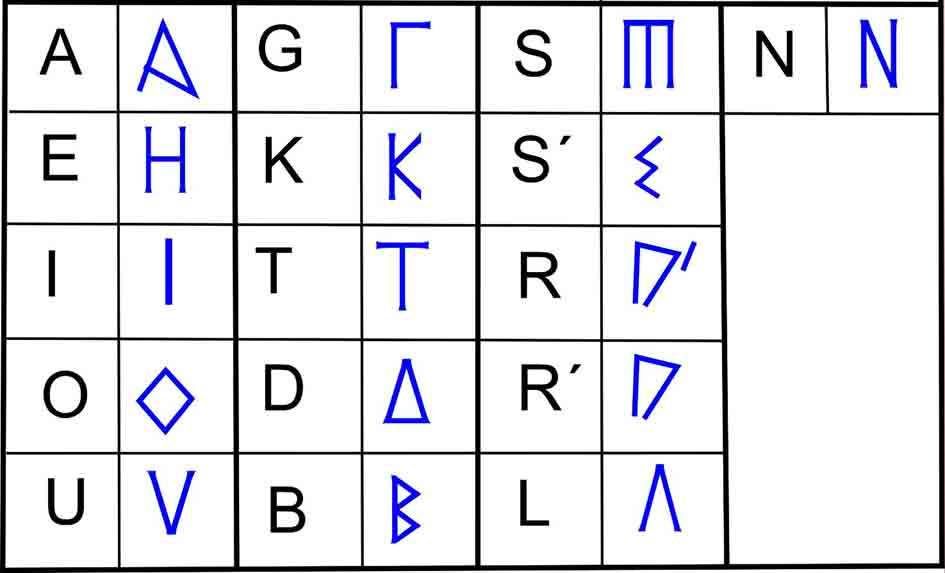
The Greco-Iberian alphabet.

The Paleohispanic scripts are the ancient writing systems created in the Iberian Peninsula before the Latin alphabet became the dominant script. They derive from the Phoenician alphabet, with the exception of the Greco-Iberian alphabet, which is a direct adaptation of the Greek alphabet. Some researchers believe that the Greek alphabet and Cypriot Syllabary may also have played a role in the origin of the other Paleohispanic scripts. Most of these scripts are notable for being semi-syllabic rather than purely alphabetic.

Paleohispanic scripts are known to have been used from the 5th century BCE—possibly as early as the 7th century, according to some researchers—until the end of the 1st century BCE or the beginning of the 1st century CE. They were the primary scripts used to write the Paleohispanic languages.

== Scripts ==
The Paleohispanic scripts are classified into three major groups: southern, northern, and Greco-Iberian, with differences in both the shapes of the glyphs and their values.

Inscriptions in the southern scripts have been found primarily in the southern half of the Iberian Peninsula. They represent only 5% of the total inscriptions discovered and mostly read from right to left (similar to the Phoenician alphabet). The southern scripts include:

- the Espanca script, known from a single tablet and recognized as the earliest attestation of an alphabetical order among the Paleohispanic scripts.
- the Tartessian or Southwest script, also known as South Lusitanian.
- the Southeastern Iberian script, also known as Meridional.

Inscriptions in the northern scripts have been found mainly in the northeast of the Iberian Peninsula. They account for 95% of the total inscriptions discovered and mostly read from left to right (like the Greek alphabet). The northern scripts include:

- the Northeastern Iberian script, also known as Levantine:
  - Dual variant
  - Non-dual variant
- the Celtiberian script
  - Western variant
  - Eastern variant.

The Greco-Iberian alphabet is a direct adaptation of the Ionic variety of the Greek alphabet and is found only in a small region along the Mediterranean coast, specifically in the modern provinces of Alicante and Murcia.

== Typology ==
Excepting the Greco-Iberian alphabet, and to a lesser extent the Tartessian (southwestern) script, Paleohispanic scripts shared a distinctive typology: they behaved as a syllabary for plosives and as an alphabet for the rest of consonants. This unique writing system has been called a semi-syllabary.

In the syllabic portions of the scripts, each plosive sign stood for a different combination of consonant and vowel, so that the written form of ga displayed no resemblance to ge, and bi looked quite different from bo. In addition, the original format did not distinguish voiced from unvoiced plosives, so that ga stood for both /ga/ and /ka/, and da stood for both /da/ and /ta/.

On the other hand, the continuants (fricatives like /s/ and sonorants like /l/, /m/, trills, and vowels) were written with simple alphabetic letters, as in Phoenician and Greek.

Over the past few decades, many researchers have come to think one variant of the northeastern Iberian script, the older one according to the archaeological contexts, distinguished voicing in the plosives by adding a stroke to the glyphs for the alveolar (/d/~/t/) and velar (/g/~/k/) syllables, creating distinct glyphs for unvoiced /t/ and /k/, and restricting the original glyphs to voiced /d/ and /g/. (This is the so-called dual signary model: see northeastern Iberian script.) If correct, this innovation would parallel the creation of the Latin letter G by the addition of a stroke to C, which had previously stood for both /k/ and /g/.

=== Tartessian ===
Tartessian script is intermediate between a pure alphabet and the Paleohispanic semi-syllabaries. Though the letter for a plosive was determined by the following vowel, as in a semi-syllabary, the following vowel was also written, as in an alphabet (as seen in Tartessian). This redundant typology re-emerged in a few late (2nd and 1st century BCE) texts of northeastern Iberian and Celtiberian scripts, where vowels were once again written after plosives. Some scholars treat Tartessian as a redundant semi-syllabary, with essentially syllabic glyphs followed by the letter for the corresponding vowel; others treat it as a redundant alphabet, with the choice of an essentially consonantal character decided by the following vowel.

This is analogous to Old Persian cuneiform, where vowels are most often written overtly but where consonants/syllables are decided by the vowel about half the time, and, to a very limited extent, to the Etruscan alphabet, where most syllables based the consonant /k/ share neither consonant nor vowel letter: Only the combinations CE, CI, KA, and QU were permitted. (This Etruscan convention is preserved in the English, not only in qu for queen, but also the letter names cee, kay, cue/qu.)

== Origins ==
The Paleohispanic semi-syllabaries clearly derive ultimately from an alphabet or alphabets circulating in the Mediterranean, but it is not known whether that was the Phoenician alphabet alone, or if archaic varieties of the Greek alphabet also played a role.

The only known full Paleohispanic signary, on the undated Espanca tablet (not completely readable, but clearly related to the southwestern and southeastern scripts), follows the Phoenician/Greek order for the first 13 of its 27 letters: Α Β Γ Δ Ι Κ Λ Μ Ν Ξ Π? ϻ Τ. The fact that southern paleohispanic /e/ appears to derive from the Phoenician letter ‘ayin, which gave rise to Greek Ο, while southern iberian /o/ derives from another letter or was perhaps invented, suggests that the development of vowels in Paleohispanic semi-syllabaries was independent of the Greek innovation. However, the order of what appears to be /u/ directly after Τ, rather than at the place of Ϝ, has suggested to some researchers a Greek influence. (In addition, the letter for /e/ in northeast Iberian resembles Greek Ε rather than the southeast Iberian letter.) The two sibilants, S and S', are attested, but there is one sign too few to account for a full 15-sign syllabary and all four of the letters M, M', R, and R' (not all of which can be positively identified with letters from the tablet), suggesting that one of the "M" or "R" symbols shown in the charts to the right is only a graphic variant.

The obvious question about the origin and evolution of these scripts is how a purely alphabetic script was changed into, or perhaps unconsciously reinterpreted as, a partial syllabary. It may be instructive to consider an unrelated development in the evolution of the Etruscan alphabet from Greek: Greek had three letters, Γ, Κ, and Ϙ, whose sounds were not distinguished in Etruscan. Nonetheless, all three were borrowed, becoming the letters C, K, and Q. All were pronounced /k/, but they were restricted to appear before different vowels — CE, CI, KA, and QU, respectively, — so that the consonants carried almost as much weight in distinguishing these syllables as the vowels did. (This may have been an attempt to overtly indicate the vowel-dependent allophony of Etruscan /k/ with the extra Greek letters that were available.) When the Etruscan alphabet was later adapted to Latin, the letter C stood for both /k/ and /g/, as Etruscan had had no /g/ sound to maintain the original sound value of Greek Г. (Later a stroke was added to C, creating the new Latin letter G.).

Something similar may have happened in the evolution of Paleohispanic scripts. If writing passed from the Phoenicians through the Tartessians, and the Tartessian language did not have /g/ or /d/, that would explain the absence of a distinction between /g/ and /k/, /d/ and /t/ in the southeastern Iberian and later northeast Iberian scripts, despite it being clear that these were distinct sounds in the Iberian language, as is clearly attested in the Greco-Iberian alphabet and later use of the Latin alphabet. In Tartessian script, vowels were always written after the plosives, but they were redundant — or at nearly so — and thus it seems they were dropped when the script passed to the Iberians.

Among the velar consonants, ka/ga of southeastern Iberian and the southwestern script derives from Phoenician/Greek Γ, ke/ge from Κ, and ki/gi from Ϙ, while ko/go (perhaps coincidentally) resembles Greek Χ (pronounced [kʰ]). Phoenician/Greek labial letter Β was the source of southwestern be, southeastern ba; the use of Π is uncertain but may have been the source of bi. (If Greek was used as a secondary source, Greek Φ ([pʰ]) would also have been available.) For the alveolars, Δ was the source of tu/du, Τ of ta/da, and Θ of ti/di.

On 24 June 2024, it was announced that a software engineer had discovered further letters accidentally on a stone slab by scrolling through social media. Further investigations will take place with more robust software to discover if there are more letters that have faded.

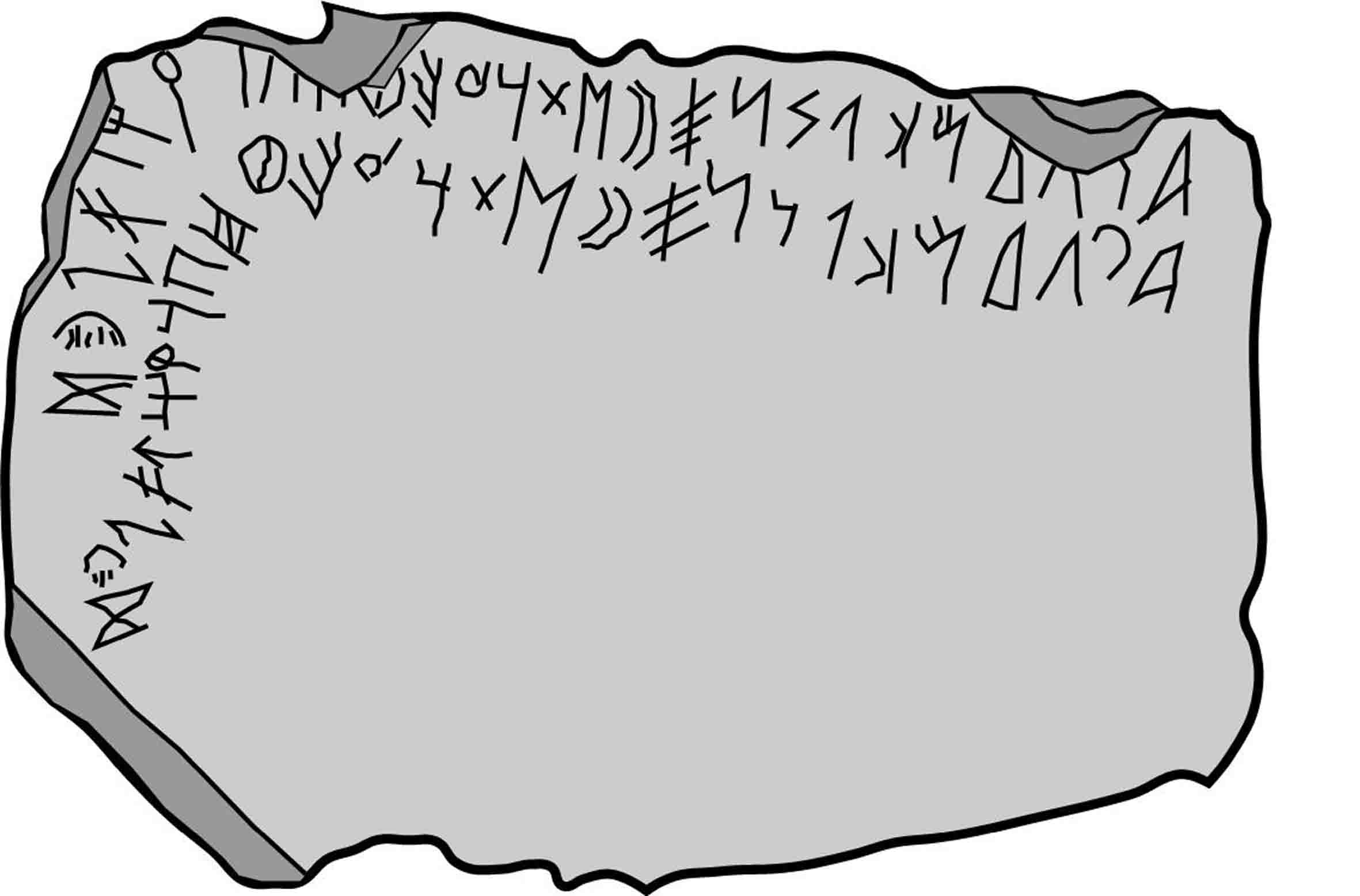
Espanca signary (Castro Verde).

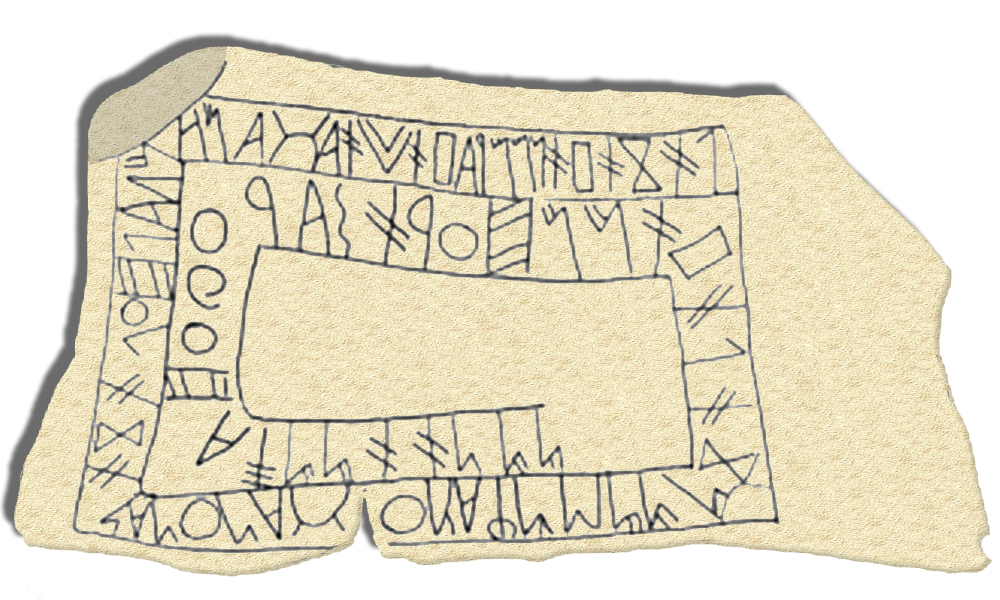
Tartessian or Southwest script. Fonte Velha (Bensafrim, Lagos).

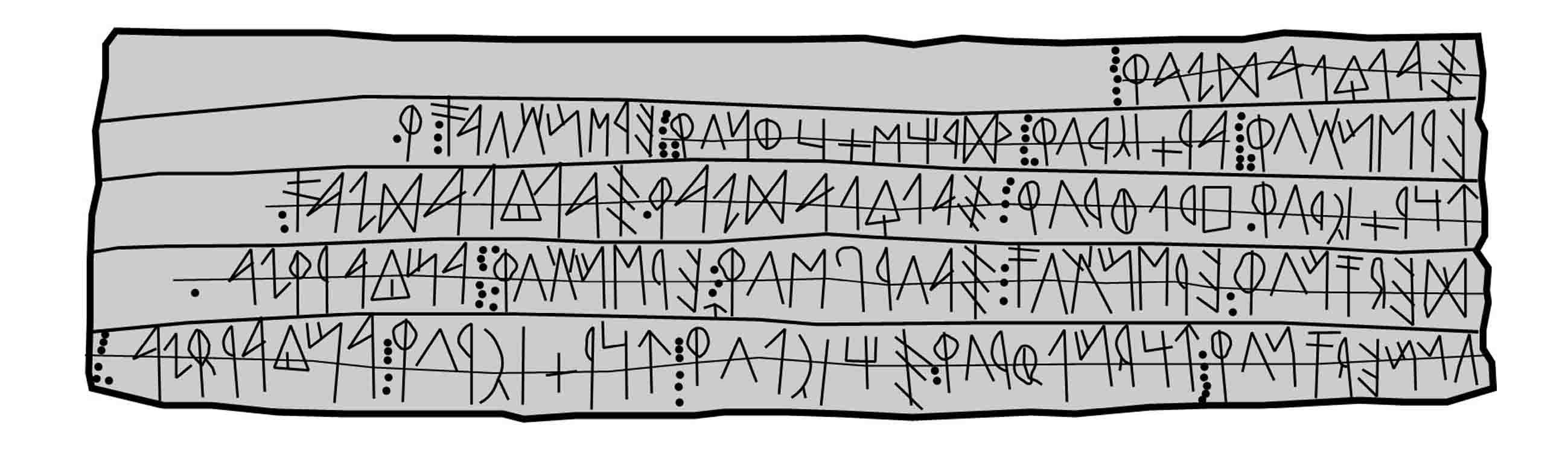
Southeastern Iberian script. Lead plaque from La Bastida de les Alcuses (Moixent).
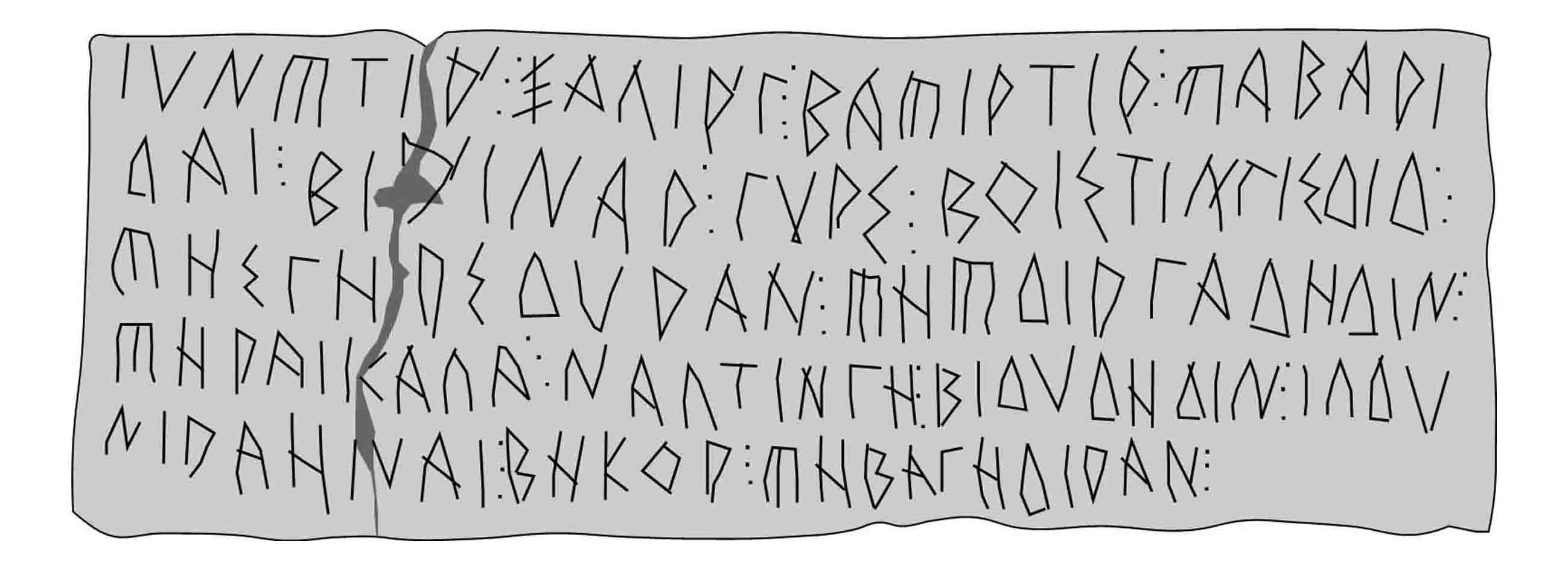
Greco-Iberian alphabet. Lead plaque from la Serreta (Alcoi).

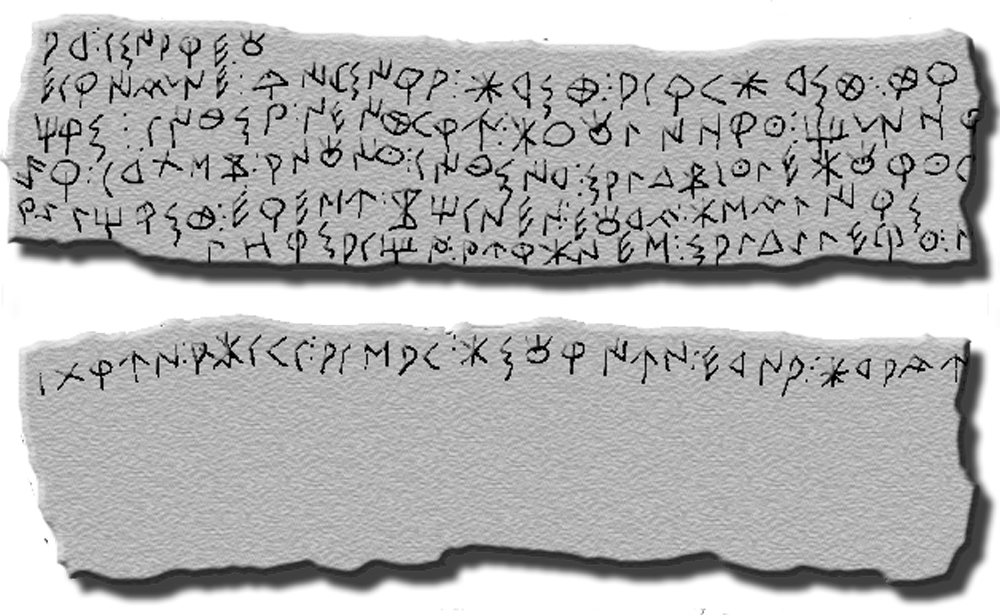
Northeastern Iberian script. Lead plaque from Ullastret.

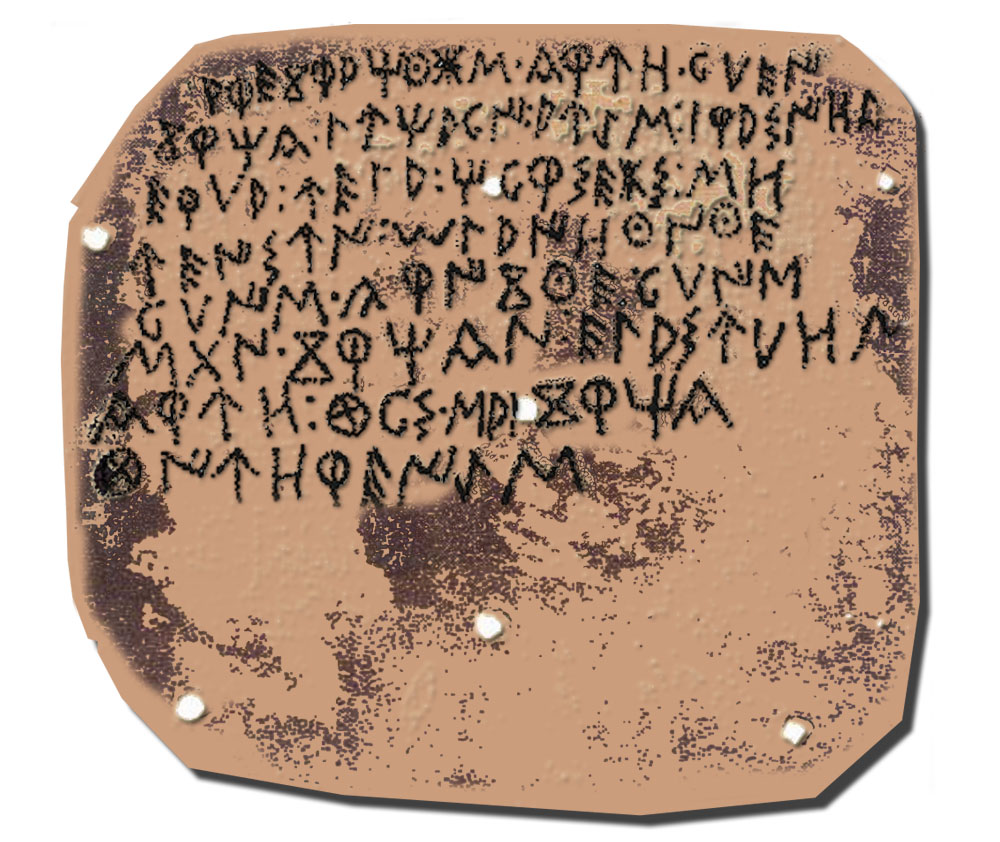
Celtiberian script. Luzaga plaque (Guadalajara, Spain).

== See also ==
- Iberian languages
- Iberian Romance languages
- Languages of Portugal
- Languages of Spain
- Pre-Roman peoples of the Iberian Peninsula
- Hand of Irulegi
- Botorrita plaque

== Bibliography ==
- Correa, José Antonio (2004): «Los semisilabarios ibéricos: algunas cuestiones», ELEA 4, pp. 75–98.
- Correa, José Antonio (2005): «Del alfabeto fenicio al semisilabario paleohispánico», Palaeohispanica 5, pp. 137–154.
- Ferrer i Jané, Joan (2005) Novetats sobre el sistema dual de diferenciació gràfica de les oclusives sordes i sonores, Palaeohispanica 5, pp. 957-982.
- Hoz, Javier de (2005): «La recepción de la escritura en Hispania como fenómeno orientalizante», Anejos del Archivo Español de Arqueología XXXV, pp. 363–380.
- Rodríguez Ramos, Jesús (2000): «La lectura de las inscripciones sudlusitano-tartesias», Faventia 22/1, pp. 21–48.
- Rodríguez Ramos, Jesús (2004): Análisis de epigrafía íbera, Vitoria-Gasteiz.
- Untermann, Jürgen : Monumenta Linguarum Hispanicarum, Wiesbaden. (1975): I Die Münzlegenden. (1980): II Die iberischen Inschriften aus Sudfrankreicht. (1990): III Die iberischen Inschriften aus Spanien. (1997): IV Die tartessischen, keltiberischen und lusitanischen Inschriften.
- Velaza, Javier (2004): «La escritura en la península ibérica antigua», La escritura y el libro en la antigüedad, Madrid, pp. 95–114.
