= Southwest Paleohispanic script =

Paleohispanic script

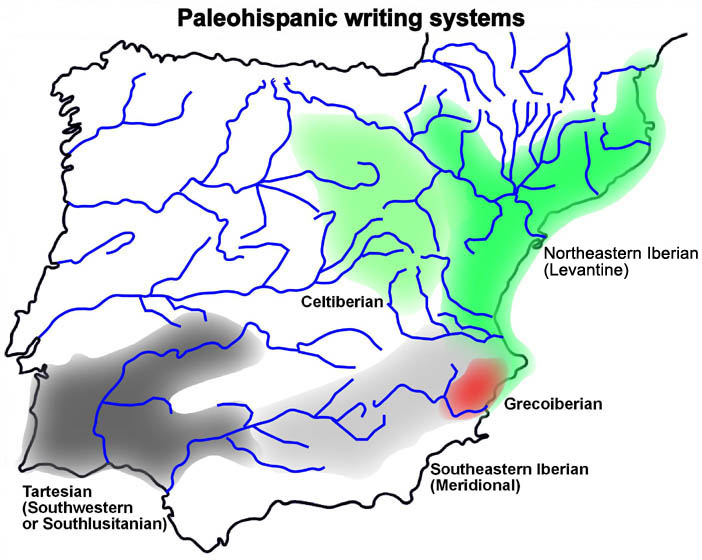
Southwestern script (dark grey) in the context of Paleohispanic scripts

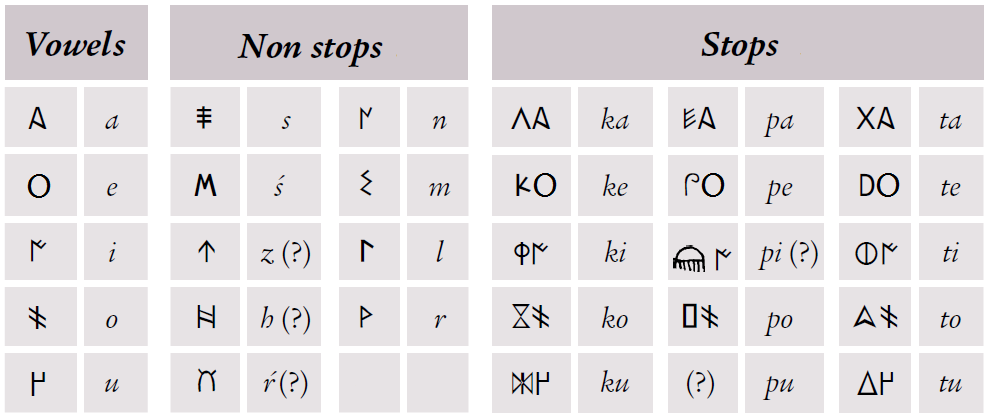
Sound values of the Southwestern script proposed by Valerio (2008)

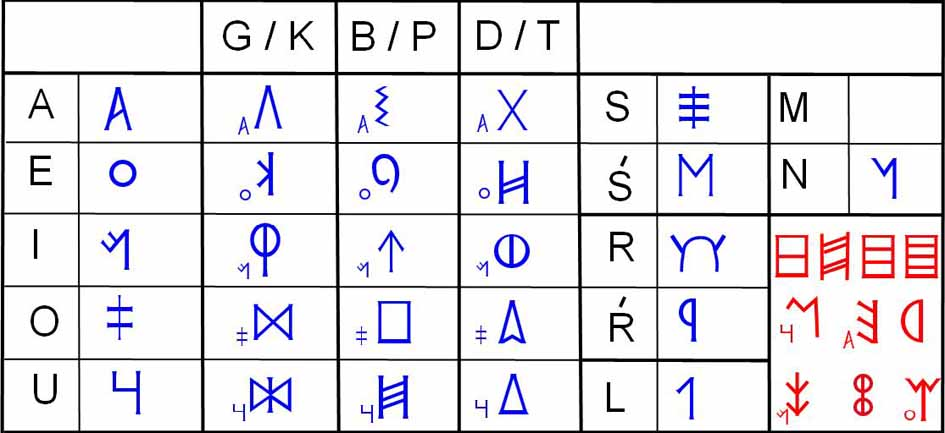
Sound values proposed by Rodríguez Ramos (2000)

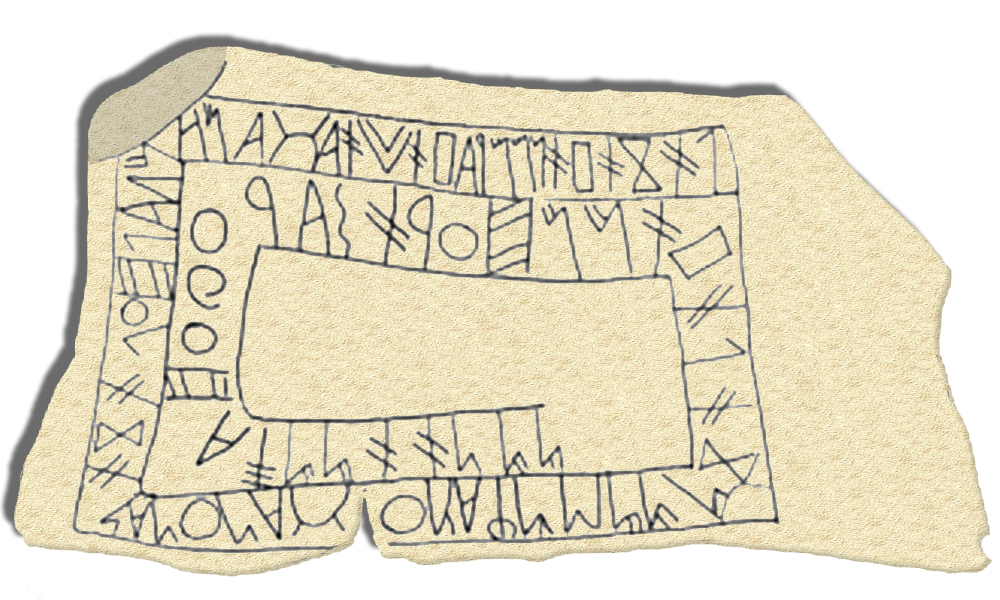
Fonte Velha (Bensafrim, Lagos)

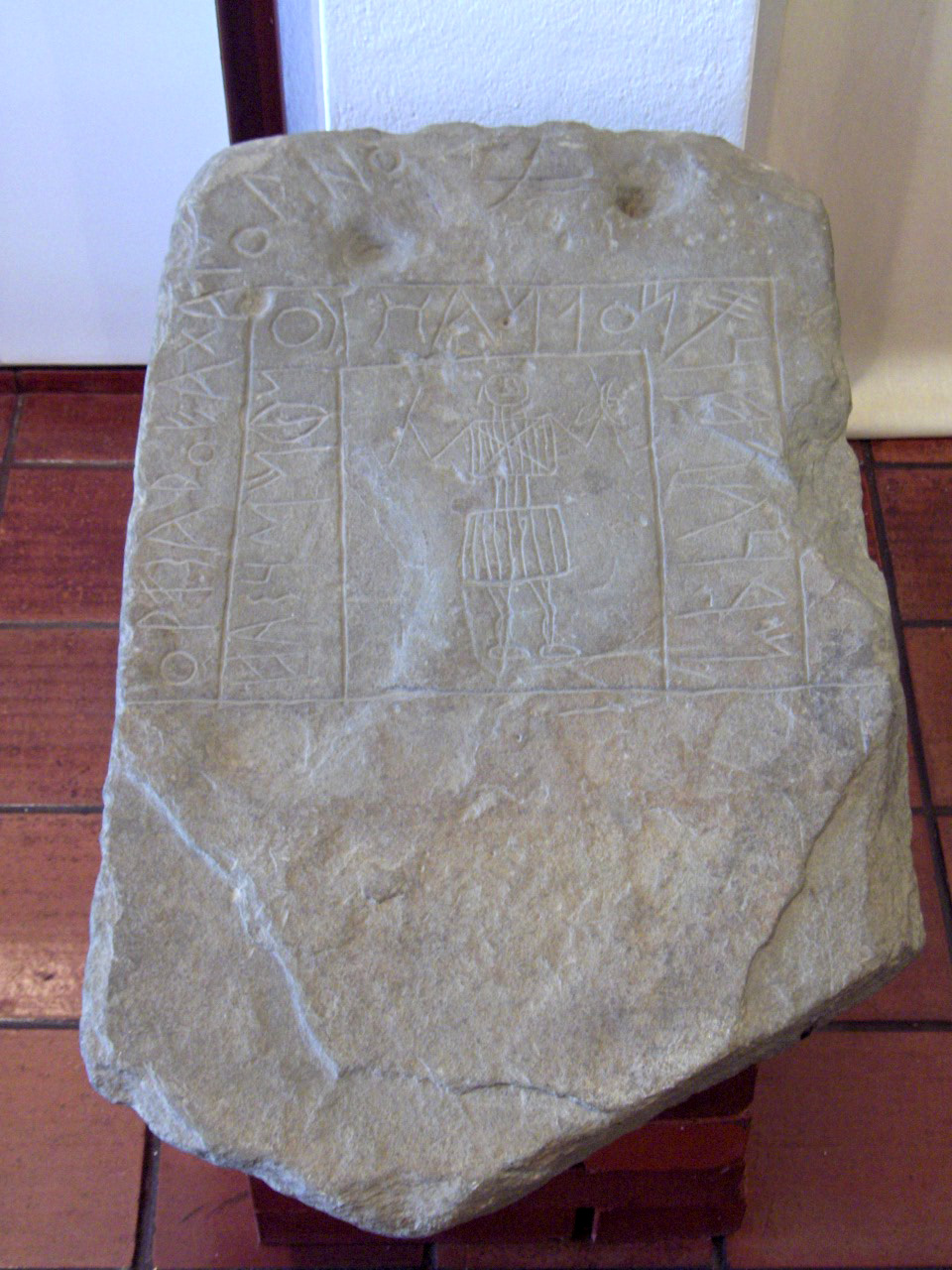
Herdade da Abobada (Almodôvar)

The Southwest Script, also known as Southwestern Script, Tartessian, South Lusitanian, and Conii script, is a Paleohispanic script used to write an unknown language typically identified as Tartessian. Southwest inscriptions have been found primarily in the southwestern quadrant of the Iberian Peninsula, mostly in the south of Portugal (specifically in the Algarve and southern Alentejo), but also in Spain (in southern Extremadura and western Andalusia).

== Name of the script ==
The name of this script is controversial. The more neutral term is "southwestern," as it refers solely to the geographic location. Some ethnolinguistic names given to this script include:

- Tartessian, as it is considered to be the script of the language spoken in Tartessos. However, this is deemed unlikely by some scholars, as only four of the hundred known inscriptions have been found within Tartessos area of influence.
- South Lusitanian, because almost all of the southwest inscriptions have been discovered in the south of Portugal, an area that was included in the Roman province of Lusitania. However, this name may incorrectly suggest a relationship with the Lusitanian language.
- Conii script, as Greek and Roman sources locate the Roman Conii or Cynetes in the area where most stelae were found.
- Bastulo-Turdetanian.

== Deciphering strategies ==
Unlike the northeastern Iberian script, the decipherment of the southwestern script is not yet complete (as is the case with the southeastern Iberian script). The two main approaches to deciphering the phonetic value of the letters have been:

- Comparative approach:This involves searching for similar letters in the southwestern script and the Phoenician alphabet, as well as other Paleohispanic scripts (namely the northeastern and southeastern scripts). The phonetic values are then compared. If a letter appears to be of Phoenician origin and has a similar phonetic value in both Phoenician and other Paleohispanic scripts, that phonetic value is assumed to be the same in the southwestern script.
- Internal analysis: This approach focuses on aspects of the language itself, such as the frequency of letters and their relationships to one another.

If the two approaches yield consistent results, the letter is considered deciphered; if not, it is deemed hypothetical. As of 2014, 20 letters are considered consensual (including all 5 vowels, 10 stops, and 5 non-stops), while all others (more than 10) remain hypothetical. The three main hypotheses regarding the script's decipherment are those of Correa (2009), de Hoz (2010), and Ramos (2002).

Because the phonetic decipherment stage is not finished, it is difficult to establish what language the script represents. Some have suggested a Celtic origin, but this idea is not widely accepted. If this hypothesis is correct, the language represented by the Southwest script would be the first Celtic language to be written. Other main hypotheses propose that the language is Iberian (or possibly non-Indo-European) and that it has Celtic influence but originates from an Iberian language.

== Writing system ==
Except for the Greco-Iberian alphabet, and to a lesser extent this script, Paleohispanic scripts shared a distinctive typology: they functioned as a syllabary for stop consonants and as an alphabet for the remaining consonants and vowels. This unique writing system is referred to as a semi-syllabary.

There is no consensus on how the Paleohispanic semi-syllabaries originated; it is generally agreed that their origin is linked to the Phoenician alphabet, although some believe the Greek alphabet also had an influence. In the southwestern script, the letter used to represent a stop consonant was determined by the following vowel, similar to a full semi-syllabary, while the following vowel was also written, as in an alphabet. A similar convention is found in Etruscan for /k/, which was written as "ka," "ce," "ci," or "qu," depending on the following vowel. Some scholars treat Tartessian as a redundant semi-syllabary, while others consider it a redundant alphabet.

The southwestern script is very similar to the southeastern Iberian script in terms of both the shape of the signs and their values. The main difference is that the southeastern Iberian script does not exhibit the vocalic redundancy of the syllabic signs. This characteristic, discovered by Ulrich Schmoll, allows for the classification of a significant portion of the southwestern signs into vowels, consonants, and syllabic signs.

== Inscriptions ==
This script is almost exclusively found on nearly a hundred large stones (steles), of which 10 were lost as of 2014. Most of these steles were discovered in modern-day Portugal, particularly in Baixo Alentejo, although some have been found in Spain. Sixteen of these steles can be seen in the Southwest Script Museum (Museu da Escrita do Sudoeste, in Portuguese) in Almodôvar, Portugal, where a stele featuring a total of 86 characters (the longest inscription found so far), discovered in 2008, is also on display.

The inscriptions likely had a funerary purpose, although the lack of well-documented archaeological contexts for the findings makes it difficult to be certain. This same factor prevents the establishment of a precise chronology, but the script is generally placed within the Iron Age, roughly between the 8th and 6th centuries BCE. It is commonly considered that the southwestern script is the most ancient of the Paleohispanic scripts. The direction of writing is usually from right to left, but it can also be boustrophedon or spiral.

== See also ==
- Paleohispanic scripts
  - Espanca script
- Pre-Roman peoples of the Iberian Peninsula
- Prehistoric Iberia
- Timeline of Portuguese history
- Cempsi and Saefs
- Celtici
