= Human sacrifice in the ancient Iberian Peninsula =

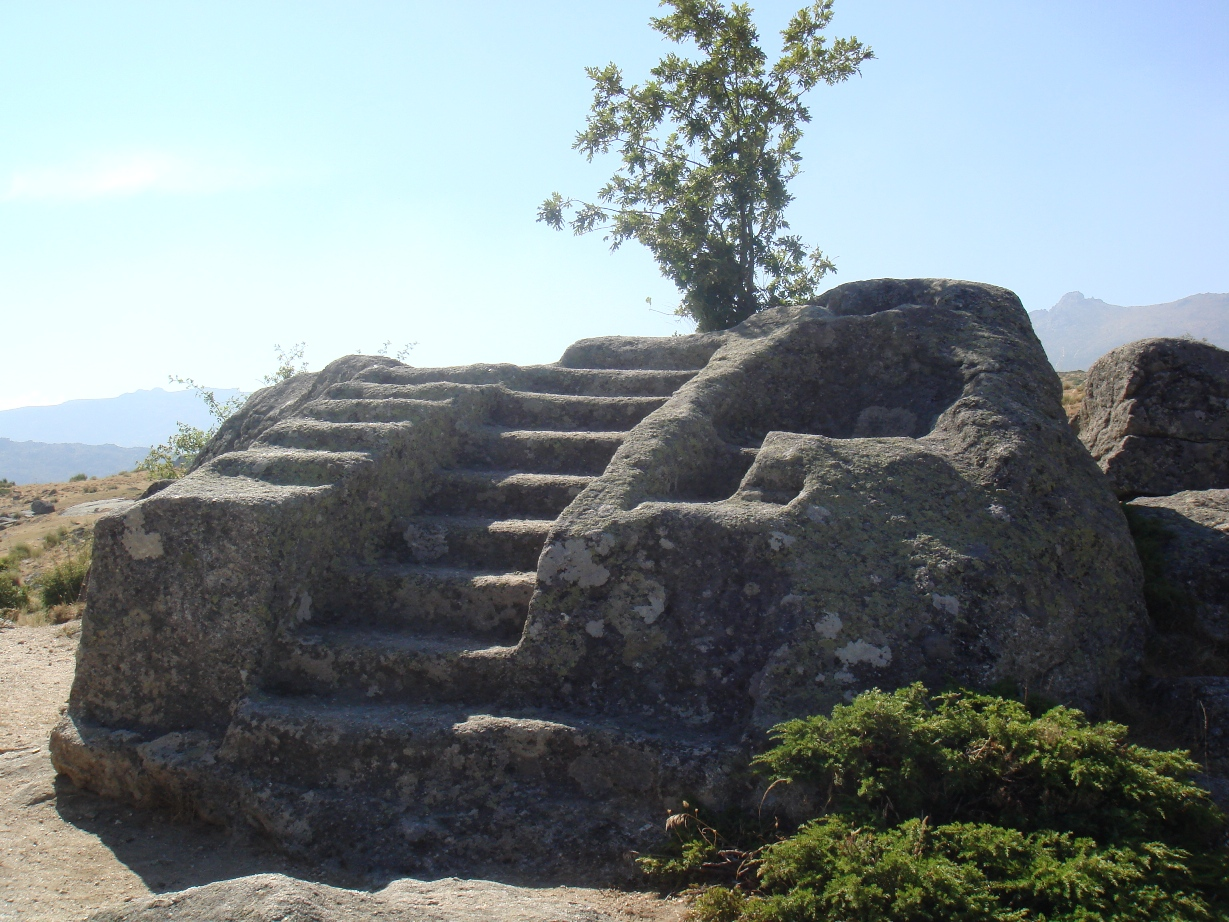
Vetton sacrificial altar. Ulaca castro, Ávila.

Human sacrifice in the ancient Iberian Peninsula is recorded in classical sources, which give it as a custom of Lusitanians and other Celtic peoples from the northern area of the peninsula. Its most complete mention comes from the work of Greek chronicler Strabo, in which those ceremonies have a divinatory utility. Modern authors have seen in this phenomenon hints of a possible priestly class among the mentioned peoples, similar to but differentiated from European Celtic druids.

== Practices ==
Strabo talks about an entire context of religious practice, executed by a diviner he calls "hieroscope" (Greek ἱερόσκοποσ, "observer of the sacred") and focused around human sacrifice by evisceration, utilized to extract prophecies from the body of a prisoner of war. Those rituals are attributed not only to Lusitanians, but also to other northern peninsular peoples described as "mountaineers". Among them, Vettones are also given similar rites by Plutarch.

The Lusitanians are given to offering sacrifices, and they inspect the vitals, without cutting them out. Besides, they also inspect the veins on the side of the victim; and they divine by the tokens of touch, too. They prophesy through means of the vitals of human beings also, prisoners of war, whom they first cover with coarse cloaks, and then, when the victim has been struck beneath the vitals by the diviner, they draw their first auguries from the fall of the victim. And they cut off the right hands of their captives and set them up as an offering to the gods.

— Strabo, Geographica, III 3.6

Human sacrifice is her associated to conventional animal sacrifice, both of them directed to the god Ares, especially venerated by Hispanics. The name is likely an interpretative assimilation (interpretatio graeca) of a native warrior deity, identified by historians as receiving several theonyms: Neto, Cosus, Borus, Tarbucellus, Cariocecus, Sagatus y Tilennus, among others.

To Ares they sacrifice a he-goat and also the prisoners and horses; and they also offer hecatombs of each kind, after the Greek fashion — as Pindar himself says, "to sacrifice a hundred of every kind."

— Strabo, Geographica, III 3, 6-7

A combination of both kinds of sacrifice, the immolation of a man and a horse, was used to seal pacts, or as a preparation before marching to war, as told by Servius Sulpicius Galba to the Roman Senate. In the funeral of Viriathus, multiple sacrifices are described to take place, being for some historians likely human immolations. Also, among the seers and magicians expelled by Scipio Aemilianus from his camp in the siege of Numantia there were likely native diviners.

== Sources and archaeology ==
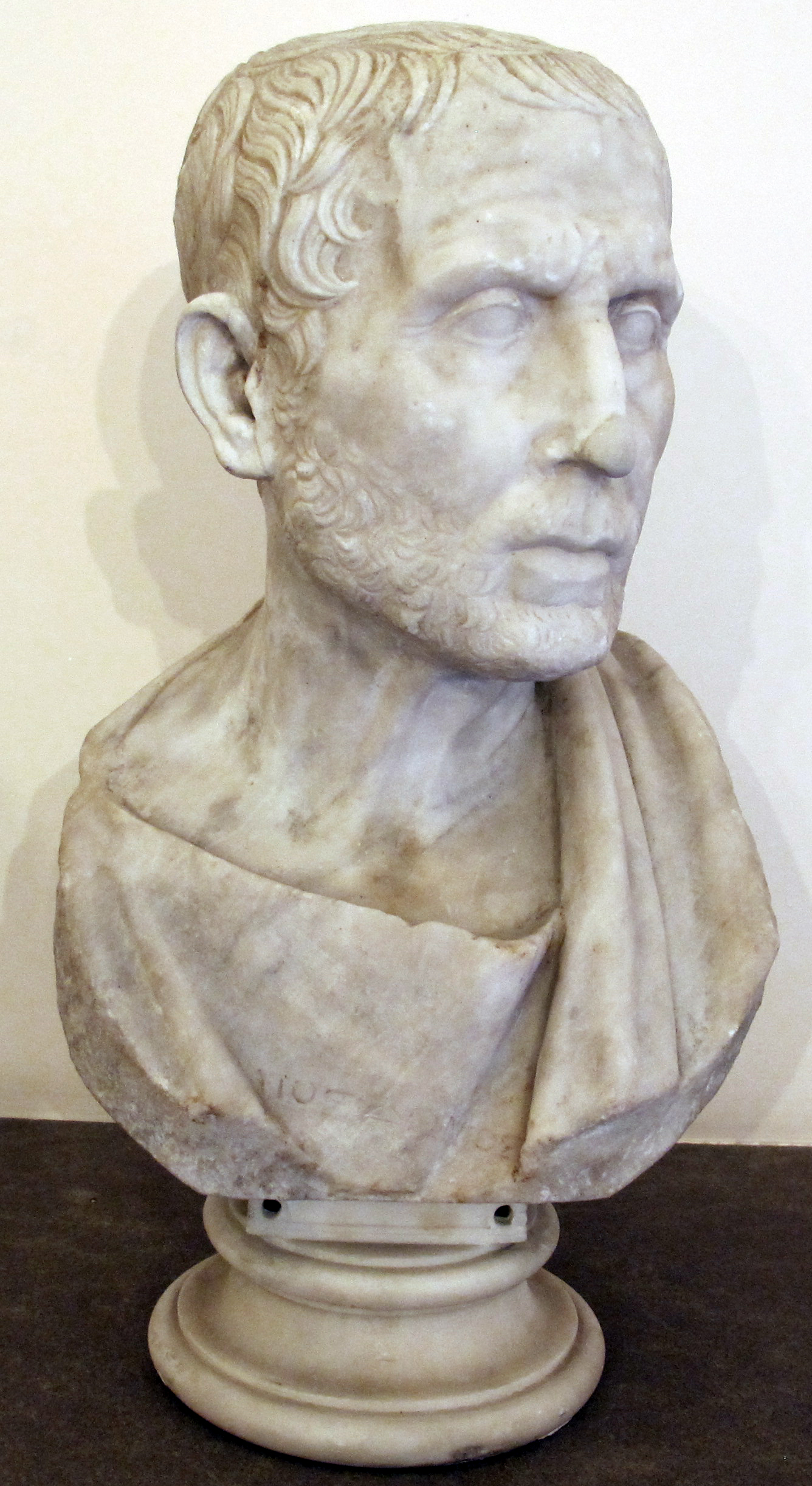
Statue of Posidonius. National Archaeological Museum, Naples.

The practitioners of the sacrifices are named only by Strabo, but the rites themselves are included in the work of Diodorus, Titus Livius and Plutarch, at least the first two being likely based on previous chronicles by Posidonius. Spanish and Portuguese archaeology, rich in findings related to mantic practices, offers corroboration, such as the inhumation of a probable human victim under the walls of Bletisama (current Ledesma), meant to consecrate the building.

As human sacrifice is a controversial topic, interpretation of those classical sources has been done with caution due to its disputable objectivity, which makes equally possible that the rites are either ethnocentrist inventions against barbarian peoples or strange but truthful customs. In this case, Hispanic historians concede that the sources' possible hostile tone, like Strabo himself, does not necessarily imply a total fabrication of the mentioned rituals, which could have been exceptional, even frequent events. The testimonies show an inner coherence that, despite their diversity, supports it.. They have also considered that Greeks and Romans themselves acknowledge the realization of human sacrifice in their own cultures, it being notable the case of the prisoners sacrificed by burial after the Battle of Cannae (226 BC) or during the Roman-Gallic wars (216 and 114-113 BC).

Hieroscopic sacrifices would be outlawed in 97 BC when Publius Licinius Crassus called for human sacrifice to be forbidden in all of the territory conquered by Rome. In spite of this, Plutarch informs that the Vetton Bletonesii tribe (located on the mentioned Bletisama) continued practising it until three years later, when Roman authorities intervened to impede it. This would not be the last case, however, as Emperors Tiberius and Claudius had to suffocate them in the Gaul and the northern areas of Africa. Worship of the Lusitanian and Celtic gods that consecrated the sacrifices in Hispania seems to have lasted until 399 BC, into the Christianization.

Authors have also noted similarities between the Lusitanian rite and the one attributed to other Indo-Europeans. Of Gaul druids, Diodorus recounts that they divined the same way: after killing the victim with a thrust to the body, they auscultated the form of his fall, the flow of blood and the convulsions of their members. Priestesses of the Cimbri also purportedly examined the entrails of prisoners, whom they previously drained off their blood by slaughter. Even Eurasian Scythians, whose customs are described by Herodotus, sport strong similarities with Lusitanians, as they would also sacrifice prisoners to Ares and would amputate the right arm as an offering. Immolation of horses and goats or sheep, also a Scythian ritual, resembles Roman suovetaurilia and Indian sautramani.

== Hieroscope ==
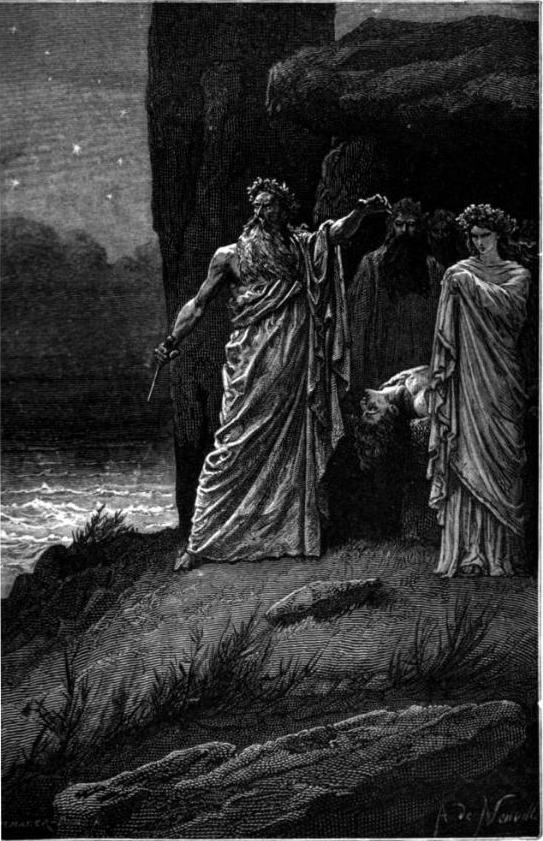
Druids. Picture by Neuville, 1883.

For several authors, the sacrificers named hieroscopes by Strabo might have been members of a hypothetical priestly office within the religion of northern Hispania, possibly related to Celtic druidism given the similarities of their divinatory practices. Those priests might have shared other transcendent functions, such as herbology, astronomy and creation of calendars, as well as the rituals of incubation associated to sanctuaries of the god Endovelicus.

Traditionally, the existence of religious specialists in Hispania has been proposed only tentatively, as sources do not attest them beyond the mentioned part, and the existence of druids in particular has been dismissed due to their literary absence in comparison to their prolific documentation in Gaul and Britania, two similarly Celtic lands. As thought by Blázquez and others, close ties between druidism and Celtic monarchies may explain that a similar caste was not developed in Hispania, as the absence of the latter would impede the former. They also speculate with a lesser Celtic influence in the Iberian Peninsula. At the same time, they concede there is a veritable analogy between druids and hieroscopes, which has driven authors like Quintela and Cardete to postulate that the believability of a rudimentary priestly class.

Historians attached to this theory reason that the wide archaeological evidence of temples, sanctuaries, nemeta and rituals in Hispania could not be understood without a religious staff that kept and managed them, especially given the level of social development of Hispanic cultures. They also cite findings such as the Vetton necropolis of La Osera (Ávila), the Luzaga's Bronze and the Botorrita plaque as possible additional evidence. An inscription on Queiriz, Beira Alta that reads ouatius has been identified by Quintela as the term vates (ouates), associated to Gaul prophets and philosophers. Hieroscopes have been also compared not only to druids, but also Greek and Roman haruspices.

It is discussed, however, the degree of professionalization sported by those possible priests, going from an occasional function, assumed sporadically by chieftains, elders or political figures, to an authentic religious caste, entirely dedicated to it. It has been proposed an individualized divinatory profession, without a true organization of class.
