= Proto-Celtic language =

Ancestor of the Celtic languages

Proto-Celtic
- PC, Common Celtic
- Reconstruction of: Celtic languages
- Region: Central or Western Europe
- Era: ca. 1300–800 BC
- Reconstructed ancestor: Proto-Indo-European

Proto-Celtic, or Common Celtic, is the reconstructed ancestral proto-language of all known Celtic languages, and a descendant of Proto-Indo-European. It is not attested in writing but has been partly reconstructed through the comparative method. Proto-Celtic is generally thought to have been spoken between 1300 and 800 BC, after which it began to split into different languages. Proto-Celtic is often associated with the Urnfield culture and particularly with the Hallstatt culture. Celtic languages share common features with Italic languages that are not found in other branches of Indo-European, suggesting the possibility of an earlier Italo-Celtic linguistic unity.

Proto-Celtic is currently being reconstructed through the comparative method by relying on later Celtic languages. Though Continental Celtic presents much substantiation for Proto-Celtic phonology, and some for its morphology, recorded material is too scanty to allow a secure reconstruction of syntax, though some complete sentences are recorded in the Continental Gaulish and Celtiberian. So, the main sources for reconstruction come from Insular Celtic languages with the oldest literature found in Old Irish and Middle Welsh, dating back to authors flourishing in the 6th century AD.

== Dating ==
Proto-Celtic is usually dated to the Late Bronze Age, ca. 1200–900 BC. The fact that it is possible to reconstruct a Proto-Celtic word for 'iron' (traditionally reconstructed as *īsarnom) has long been taken as an indication that the divergence into individual Celtic languages did not start until the Iron Age (8th century BC to 1st century BC); otherwise, descendant languages might have developed their own, unrelated words for the metal. However, Schumacher and Schrijver suggest a date for Proto-Celtic as early as the 13th century BC, the time of the Canegrate culture, in northwest Italy, and the Urnfield culture in Central Europe, implying that the divergence may have already started in the Bronze Age.

== Sound changes from Proto-Indo-European ==
The phonological changes from Proto-Indo-European (PIE) to Proto-Celtic (PC) may be summarized as follows. The changes are roughly in chronological order, with changes that operate on the outcome of earlier ones appearing later in the list.

=== Late PIE ===
These changes are shared by several other Indo-European branches.

- *e is colored by an adjacent laryngeal consonant:
  - eh₂, h₂e > ah₂, h₂a
  - eh₃, h₃e > oh₃, h₃o
- Palatovelars merge into the plain velars:
  - ḱ > k
  - ǵ > g
  - ǵʰ > gʰ
- Epenthetic *a is inserted after a syllabic sonorant if a laryngeal and another sonorant follow (R̥HR > RaHR)
- Laryngeals are lost:
  - before a following vowel (HV > V)
  - following a vowel in syllables before the accent (VHC´ > VC´)
  - following a vowel before a consonant, or word finally, resulting in compensatory lengthening, thus (VHC > V̄C, VH# > V̄#)
  - between plosives in non-initial syllables (CHC > CC)
- Two adjacent dentals become two adjacent sibilants (TT > TsT > ss)

==== Italo-Celtic ====
The following sound changes are shared with the Italic languages in particular, and are cited in support of the Italo-Celtic hypothesis.

- Dybo's rule: long close vowels are shortened (or a laryngeal is lost) before resonant + stressed vowel. Note that something like Dybo's rule seems to have also operated in Germanic (Old English wer < *wiHró-).
  - īR´ / ? *iHR´ > iR´
  - ūR´ / ? *uHR´ > uR´
- Possibly, post-consonantal laryngeals are lost when before pre-tonic close vowels:
  - CHiC´ > CiC´
  - CHuC´ > CuC´
- Development of initial stress, following the previous two changes. But note that this seems to have been an areal feature, shared, for example with the Indo-European Germanic languages and the non-Indo-European Etruscan language.
- Possibly, vocalization of laryngeals to *ī between a *CR cluster and consonantal *j (CRHjV > CRījV)
- Syllabic laryngeals become *a (CHC > CaC)
- Syllabic resonants before a voiced unaspirated stop become *Ra (R̩D > RaD)
- *m is assimilated or lost before a glide:
  - mj > nj
  - mw > w
- *p assimilates to *kʷ when another *kʷ follows later in the word (p...kʷ > kʷ...kʷ). But Matasovic points out that: A) this change may have occurred late in Celtic; B) it seems not to have operated on some words in Irish; and C) a similar assimilation (though in reverse) also occurred in Germanic.

One change shows non-exact parallels in Italic: vocalization of syllabic resonants next to laryngeals depending on the environment. Similar developments appear in Italic, but for the syllabic nasals *m̩, *n̩, the result is Proto-Italic *əm, *ən (> Latin em ~ im, en ~ in).

- Word-initially, HR̩C > aRC
- Before voiceless stops, CR̩HT > CRaT
- CR̩HV > CaRHV
- CR̩HC > CRāC

=== Early PC ===
- Sequences of velar and *w merge into the labiovelars (it is uncertain if this preceded or followed the next change; that is, whether gw > b or gw > gʷ, but Schumacher 2004 argues on p. 372 that this change came first; moreover, it is also found in Proto-Italic, and thus arguably belongs to the previous section):
  - kw > kʷ
  - gw > gʷ
  - gʰw > gʷʰ
- *gʷ merges into *b.
- Aspirated stops lose their aspiration and merge with the voiced stops (except that this counterfeeds the previous change, so *gʷʰ > *gʷ doesn't result in a merger; that is, the change *gʷʰ > *gʷ must crucially happen after the sound change gʷ > b has been completed):
  - bʰ > b
  - dʰ > d
  - gʰ > g
  - gʷʰ > gʷ
- *e before a resonant and *a (but not *ā) becomes *a as well (eRa > aRa): *ǵʰelH-ro > *gelaro > *galaro / *gérH-no > *gerano > *garano (Joseph's rule).
- Epenthetic *i is inserted after syllabic liquids when followed by a plosive:
  - l̩T > liT
  - r̩T > riT
- Epenthetic *a is inserted before the remaining syllabic resonants:
  - m̩ > am
  - n̩ > an
  - l̩ > al
  - r̩ > ar
- All remaining nonsyllabic laryngeals are lost.
- ē > ī
- ō > ū in final syllables
- Long vowels are shortened before a syllable-final resonant (V:RC > VRC); this also shortens long diphthongs. (Osthoff's law)

=== Late PC ===
- Plosives become *x before a different plosive or *s (C₁C₂ > xC₂, Cs > xs)
- p > b before liquids (pL > bL)
- p > w before nasals (pN > wN)
- p > ɸ (except possibly after *s)
- ō > ā
- ey > ē (but not in Celtiberian or Lepontic)
- ew > ow
- uwa > owa

=== Examples ===
PIE	PC	Example						
PIE	PC	PIE	Proto-Celtic		Old Irish		Welsh	
*p	*ɸ	*ph₂tḗr	*ɸatīr	father	athir		edrydd	cf. home (< *ɸatrijo-)
*t	*t	*tréyes	*trīs	three	trí		tri	
*k, ḱ	*k	*kh₂n̥-e- *ḱm̥tom	*kan-o- *kantom	sing hundred	canaid cét /kʲeːd/		canu cant	
*kʷ	*kʷ	*kʷetwores	*kʷetwares	four	ceth(a)ir		pedwar	
*b	*b	*h₂ébōl	*abalom	apple	uball		afal	
*d	*d	*derḱ-	*derk-	see	derc	eye	drych	sight
*g, ǵ	*g	*gleh₁i- *ǵen-u-	*gli-na- *genu-	to glue jaw	glen(a)id giun, gin	(he) sticks fast mouth	glynu gên	adhere jaw
*gʷ	*b	*gʷenh₂	*bena	woman	ben		O.W. ben	
*bʰ	*b	*bʰére-	*ber-o-	carry	berid	(he) carries	adfer cymeryd	to restore to take
*dʰ	*d	*dʰeh₁i-	*di-na-	suck	denait	they suck	dynu, denu	
*gʰ, ǵʰ	*g	*gʰh₁bʰ-(e)y- *ǵʰelH-ro-	*gab-i- *galaro-	take sickness	ga(i)bid galar	(he) takes sickness	gafael galar	hold grief
*gʷʰ	*gʷ	*gʷʰn̥-	*gʷan-o-	kill, wound	gonaid	(he) wounds, slays	gwanu	stab
*s	*s	*sen-o-	*senos	old	sen		hen	
*m	*m	*méh₂tēr	*mātīr	mother	máthir		modryb	cf. aunt
*n	*n	*h₂nép-ōt-	*neɸūts	nephew	niad		nai	
*l	*l	*leyǵʰ-	*lig-e/o-	lick	ligid	(he) licks	llyo, llyfu	
*r	*r	*h₃rēǵ-s	*rīgs	king	rí (gen. ríg)		rhi	
*j	*j	*h₂yuh₁n-ḱós	*juwankos	young	óac		ieuanc	
*w	*w	*h₂wl̥h₁tí-	*wlatis	rulership	flaith		gwlad	country

PIE		PC	Example						
PIE		PC	PIE	PC		Old Irish		Welsh	
*a, *h₂e		*a	*h₂ep-h₃ōn-	*abū acc. *abonen	river	aub		afon	
*ā, *eh₂		*ā	*bʰréh₂tēr	*brātīr	brother	bráthir		brawd	
*e, h₁e		*e	*sen-o-	*senos	old	sen		hen	
*H	between consonants	*a	*ph₂tḗr	*ɸatīr	father	athir		edrydd	cf. home
*ē, eh₁		*ī	*weh₁-ro-	*wīros	true	fír		gwir	
*o, Ho, h₃e		*o	*Hroth₂o-	*rotos	wheel	roth		rhod	
*ō, eh₃	in final syllable	*ū	*h₂nép-ōt-	*neɸūts	nephew	niæ		nai	
*ō, eh₃	elsewhere	*ā	*deh₃no-	*dāno-	gift	dán		dawn	
*i		*i	*gʷih₃-tu-	*bitus	world	bith		byd	
*ī, iH		*ī	*rīmeh₂	*rīmā	number	rím		rhif	
*ai, h₂ei, eh₂i		*ai	*kaikos *seh₂itlo-	*kaikos *saitlo-	blind age	cáech —	one-eyed —	coeg hoedl	empty, one-eyed age
*(h₁)ei, ēi, eh₁i		*ei	*deywos	*deiwos	god	día		duw	
*oi, ōi, h₃ei, eh₃i		*oi	*oynos	*oinos	one	óen oín; áen aín		un	
*u	before *wa	*o	*h₂yuh₁n-ḱós	*juwankos > *jowankos	young	óac		ieuanc	
*u	elsewhere	*u	*srutos	*srutos	stream	sruth		ffrwd	
*ū, uH		*ū	*ruHneh₂	*rūnā	mystery	rún		rhin	
*au, h₂eu, eh₂u		*au	*tausos	*tausos	silent	táue	silence (*tausijā)	taw	
*(h₁)eu, ēu, eh₁u; *ou, ōu, h₃eu, eh₃u		*ou	*tewteh₂ *gʷeh₃-u-s	*toutā *bows	people cow	túath bó		tud M.W. bu, biw	
*l̥	before stops	*li	*pl̥th₂nós	*ɸlitanos	wide	lethan		llydan	
*l̥	before other consonants	*al	*kl̥h₁-	*kaljākos	rooster	cailech (Ogham gen. caliaci)		ceiliog	
*r̩	before stops	*ri	*bʰr̩ti-	*briti-	act of bearing; mind	breth, brith		bryd	
*r̩	before other consonants	*ar	*mr̩wos	*marwos	dead	marb		marw	
*m̩		*am	*dm̩-nh₂-	*damna-	subdue	M.Ir. damnaid	he ties, fastens, binds	—	
*n̩		*an	*h₃dn̥t-	*dant	tooth	dét /dʲeːd/		dant	
*l̩H	before obstruents	*la	*h₂wlh₁tí-	*wlatis	lordship	flaith		gwlad	country
*l̩H	before sonorants	*lā	*pl̩Hmeh₂	*ɸlāmā	hand	lám		llaw	
*r̩H	before obstruents	*ra	*mr̩Htom	*mratom	betrayal	mrath		brad	
*r̩H	before sonorants	*rā	*ǵr̩Hnom	*grānom	grain	grán		grawn	
*m̩H	(presumably with same distribution as above)	*am/mā	*dm̩h₂-ye/o-	*damje/o-	to tame	daimid fodam-	daimid -	goddef	endure, suffer
*n̩H	(presumably with same distribution as above)	*an/nā	*ǵn̩h₃to- ?	*gnātos	known	gnáth		gnawd	customary

== Phonological reconstruction ==
=== Consonants ===
The following consonants have been reconstructed for Proto-Celtic (PC):

Manner	Voicing	Bilabial	Alveolar	Palatal	Velar	
Manner	Voicing	Bilabial	Alveolar	Palatal	plain	labialized
Plosive	voiceless		t		k	kʷ
Plosive	voiced	b	d		ɡ	ɡʷ
Fricative		ɸ	s		x	
Nasal		m	n			
Approximant			l	j		w
Trill			r			

==== Allophones of plosives ====
Eska has recently proposed that PC stops allophonically manifest similarly to those in English. Voiceless stop phonemes /t k/ were aspirated word-initially except when preceded by /s/, hence aspirate allophones [tʰ kʰ]; unaspirated voiced stops /b d ɡ/ were devoiced to [p t k] word-initially.

This allophony may be reconstructed to PC from the following evidence:

- Modern Celtic languages like Welsh, Breton, and all modern Goidelic languages have such plosive aspiration and voice allophony already attested. (But there is no trace of this in Gaulish.)
- Several old Celtic languages (such as Old Irish, Old Welsh, and Lepontic) used letters for voiceless stop phonemes to write both voiceless stop phonemes and their voiced counterparts, especially non-word-initially. (But in the case of Lepontic, this is because the alphabet was derived from Etruscan, which has no voice contrasts in plosives.)
- The Celtiberian Luzaga's Bronze has the curious spelling of an accusative determiner sdam, where the d is clearly meant to spell [t]. This implies that Celtiberian /d/ had a voiceless allophone [t].

==== Evolution of plosives ====
Proto-Indo-European (PIE) voiced aspirate stops *bʰ, *dʰ, *gʰ/ǵʰ, merge with *b, *d, *g/ǵ in PC. The voiced aspirate labiovelar *gʷʰ did not merge with *gʷ, though: plain *gʷ became PC *b, while aspirated *gʷʰ became *gʷ. Thus, PIE *gʷen- 'woman' became Old Irish and Old Welsh ben, but PIE *gʷʰn̥- 'to kill, wound' became Old Irish gonaid and Welsh gwanu.

PIE *p is lost in PC, apparently going through the stages *ɸ (possibly a stage *[pʰ]) and *h (perhaps seen in the name Hercynia if this is of Celtic origin) before being completely lost word-initially and between vowels. Next to consonants, PC *ɸ underwent different changes: the clusters *ɸs and *ɸt became *xs and *xt respectively already in PC. PIE *sp- became Old Irish s (f- when lenited, exactly as for PIE *sw-) and Brythonic f; while Schrijver 1995, p. 348 argues there was an intermediate stage *sɸ- (in which *ɸ remained an independent phoneme until after Proto-Insular Celtic had diverged into Goidelic and Brythonic), McCone 1996, pp. 44–45 finds it more economical to believe that *sp- remained unchanged in PC, that is, the change *p to *ɸ did not happen when *s preceded. (Similarly, Grimm's law did not apply to *p, t, k after *s in Germanic, and the same exception occurred again in the High German consonant shift.)

Proto-Celtic	Old Irish	Welsh
*laɸs- > *laxs- 'shine'	las-aid	llach-ar
*seɸtam > *sextam 'seven'	secht	saith
*sɸeret- or *speret- 'heel'	seir	ffêr

In Gaulish and the Brittonic languages, the Proto-Indo-European *kʷ phoneme becomes a new p sound. Thus, Gaulish petuar[ios], Welsh pedwar "four", but Old Irish cethair and Latin quattuor. Insofar as this new /p/ fills the gap in the phoneme inventory which was left by the disappearance of the equivalent stop in PIE, we may think of this as a chain shift.

The terms P-Celtic and Q-Celtic are useful for grouping Celtic languages based on the way they handle this one phoneme. But a simple division into P- / Q-Celtic may be untenable, as it does not do justice to the evidence of the ancient Continental Celtic languages. The unusual shared innovations among the Insular Celtic languages are often also presented as evidence against a P- vs Q-Celtic division, but they may instead reflect a common substratum influence from the pre-Celtic languages of Britain and Ireland, or simply continuing contact between the insular languages; in either case they would be irrelevant to the genetic classification of Celtic languages.

Q-Celtic languages may also have /p/ in loan words, though in early borrowings from Welsh into Primitive Irish, /kʷ/ was used by sound substitution due to a lack of a /p/ phoneme at the time:

- Latin Patricius "Saint Patrick"' > Welsh > Primitive Irish Qatricias > Old Irish Cothrige, later Pádraig;
- Latin presbyter "priest" > early form of word seen in Old Welsh premter primter > Primitive Irish qrimitir > Old Irish cruimther.

Gaelic póg "kiss" was a later borrowing (from the second word of the Latin phrase osculum pacis "kiss of peace") at a stage where p was borrowed directly as p, without substituting c.

=== Vowels ===
The PC vowel system is highly comparable to that reconstructed for PIE by Antoine Meillet. The following monophthongs are reconstructed:

Type	Front		Central		Back	
Type	long	short	long	short	long	short
Close	iː	i			uː	u
Mid	eː	e				o
Open			aː	a		

The following diphthongs have also been reconstructed:

Type	With -i	With -u
With a-	ai	au
With o-	oi	ou

== Morphology ==
=== Nouns ===
The morphological structure of nouns and adjectives demonstrates no arresting alterations from the parent language. Proto-Celtic is believed to have had nouns in three genders, three numbers and five to eight cases. The genders were masculine, feminine and neuter; the numbers were singular, plural and dual. The number of cases is a subject of contention: while Old Irish may have only five, the evidence from Continental Celtic is considered rather unambiguous despite appeals to archaic retentions or morphological leveling. These cases were nominative, vocative, accusative, dative, genitive, ablative, locative and instrumental.

Nouns fall into nine or so declensions, depending on stem. There are *o-stems, *ā-stems, *i-stems, *u-stems, dental stems, velar stems, nasal stems, *r-stems and *s-stems.

==== *o-stem nouns ====
*makkʷos 'son' (masculine) (Old Irish mac ~ Welsh, Cornish and Breton mab)

Case	Singular	Dual	Plural
Nominative	*makkʷos	*makkʷou	*makkʷoi
Vocative	*makkʷe	*makkʷou	*makkʷūs
Accusative	*makkʷom	*makkʷou	*makkʷūs
Genitive	*makkʷī	*makkʷūs	*makkʷom
Dative	*makkʷūi	*makkʷobom	*makkʷobos
Ablative	*makkʷū	*makkʷobim	*makkʷobis
Instrumental	*makkʷū	*makkʷobim	*makkʷūs
Locative	*makkʷei	*makkʷou	*makkʷobis

However, Celtiberian shows -o- stem genitives ending in -o rather than -ī: aualo "[son] of Avalos". Also note that the genitive singular does not match Proto-Indo-European's -osyo, which would have yielded -osjo.

- dūnom 'stronghold' (neuter)

Case	Singular	Dual	Plural
Nominative	*dūnom	*dūnou	*dūnā
Vocative	*dūnom	*dūnou	*dūnā
Accusative	*dūnom	*dūnou	*dūnā
Genitive	*dūnī	*dūnūs	*dūnom
Dative	*dūnūi	*dūnobom	*dūnobos
Ablative	*dūnū	*dūnobim	*dūnobis
Instrumental	*dūnū	*dūnobim	*dūnūs
Locative	*dūnei	*dūnou	*dūnobis

As in the masculine paradigm, the genitive singular does not match Proto-Indo-European's -osyo, which would have yielded -osjo.

==== *ā-stem nouns ====
E.g. *ɸlāmā 'hand' (feminine) (Old Irish lám; Welsh llaw, Cornish leuv, Old Breton lom)

Case	Singular	Dual	Plural
Nominative	*ɸlāmā	*ɸlāmai	*ɸlāmās
Vocative	*ɸlāmā	*ɸlāmai	*ɸlāmās
Accusative	*ɸlāmām	*ɸlāmai	*ɸlāmās
Genitive	*ɸlāmās	*ɸlāmajous	*ɸlāmom
Dative	*ɸlāmāi	*ɸlāmābom	*ɸlāmābos
Ablative	*ɸlāmī	*ɸlāmābim	*ɸlāmābis
Instrumental	*ɸlāmī	*ɸlāmābim	*ɸlāmābis
Locative	*ɸlāmāi	*ɸlāmābim	*ɸlāmābis

==== *i-stems ====
E.g. *sūlis 'sight, view, eye' (feminine) (Brittonic sulis ~ Old Irish súil)

Case	Singular	Dual	Plural
Nominative	*sūlis	*sūlī	*sūlīs
Vocative	*sūli	*sūlī	*sūlīs
Accusative	*sūlim	*sūlī	*sūlīs
Genitive	*sūleis	*sūljous	*sūljom
Dative	*sūlei	*sūlibom	*sūlibos
Ablative	*sūlī	*sūlibim	*sūlibis
Instrumental	*sūlī	*sūlibim	*sūlibis
Locative	*sūlī	*sūlibim	*sūlibis

E.g. *mori 'body of water, sea' (neuter) (Gaulish Mori- ~ Old Irish muir ~ Welsh môr)

Case	Singular	Dual	Plural
Nominative	*mori	*morī	*moryā
Vocative	*mori	*morī	*moryā
Accusative	*mori	*morī	*moryā
Genitive	*moreis	*moryous	*moryom
Dative	*morei	*moribom	*moribos
Ablative	*morī	*moribim	*moribis
Instrumental	*morī	*moribim	*moribis
Locative	*morī	*moribim	*moribis

==== *u-stem nouns ====
E.g. *bitus 'world, existence' (masculine) (Gaulish Bitu- ~ Old Irish bith ~ Welsh byd ~ Breton bed)

Case	Singular	Dual	Plural
Nominative	*bitus	*bitou	*bitowes
Vocative	*bitu	*bitou	*bitowes
Accusative	*bitum	*bitou	*bitūs
Genitive	*bitous	*bitowou	*bitowom
Dative	*bitou	*bitubom	*bitubos
Ablative	*bitū	*bitubim	*bitubis
Instrumental	*bitū	*bitubim	*bitubis
Locative	*bitū	*bitubim	*bitubis

E.g. *beru "rotisserie spit" (neuter)

Case	Singular	Dual	Plural
Nominative	*beru	*berou	*berwā
Vocative	*beru	*berou	*berwā
Accusative	*beru	*berou	*berwā
Genitive	*berous	*berowou	*berowom
Dative	*berou	*berubom	*berubos
Ablative	*berū	*berubim	*berubis
Instrumental	*berū	*berubim	*berubis
Locative	*berū	*berubim	*berubis

==== Velar and dental stems ====
Before the *-s of the nominative singular, a velar consonant was fricated to *-x : *rīg- "king" > *rīxs. Likewise, final *-d devoiced to *-t-: *druwid- "druid" > *druwits.

E.g. *rīxs "king" (masculine)

Case	Singular	Dual	Plural
Nominative	*rīxs	*rīge	*rīges
Vocative	*rīxs	*rīge	*rīges
Accusative	*rīgam	*rīge	*rīgās
Genitive	*rīgos	*rīgou	*rīgom
Dative	*rīgei	*rīgobom	*rīgobos
Ablative	*rīgī	*rīgobim	*rīgobis
Instrumental	*rīge	*rīgobim	*rīgobis
Locative	*rīgi	*rīgobim	*rīgobis

E.g. *druwits "druid" (masculine)

Case	Singular	Dual	Plural
Nominative	*druwits	*druwide	*druwides
Vocative	*druwits	*druwide	*druwides
Accusative	*druwidam	*druwide	*druwidās
Genitive	*druwidos	*druwidou	*druwidom
Dative	*druwidei	*druwidobom	*druwidobos
Ablative	*druwidī	*druwidobim	*druwidobis
Instrumental	*druwide	*druwidobim	*druwidobis
Locative	*druwidi	*druwidobim	*druwidobis

E.g. *karants "friend" (masculine)

Case	Singular	Dual	Plural
Nominative	*karants	*karante	*karantes
Vocative	*karants	*karante	*karantes
Accusative	*karantam	*karante	*karantās
Genitive	*karantos	*karantou	*karantom
Dative	*karantei	*karantobom	*karantobos
Ablative	*karantī	*karantobim	*karantobis
Instrumental	*karante	*karantobim	*karantobis
Locative	*karanti	*karantobim	*karantobis

==== Nasal stems ====
Generally, nasal stems end in *-on-; this becomes *-ū in the nominative singular: *abon- "river" > *abū.

E.g. *abū "river" (feminine)

Case	Singular	Dual	Plural
Nominative	*abū	*abone	*abones
Vocative	*abū	*abone	*abones
Accusative	*abonam	*abone	*abonās
Genitive	*abonos	*abonou	*abonom
Dative	*abonei	*abnobom	*abnobos
Ablative	*abonī	*abnobim	*abnobis
Instrumental	*abone	*abnobim	*abnobis
Locative	*aboni	*abnobim	*abnobis

E.g. *anman "name" (neuter)

Case	Singular	Dual	Plural
Nominative	*anman	*anmanī	*anmanā
Vocative	*anman	*anmanī	*anmanā
Accusative	*anman	*anmanī	*anmanā
Genitive	*anmēs	*anmanou	*anmanom
Dative	*anmanei	*anmambom	*anmambos
Ablative	*anmanī	*anmambim	*anmambis
Instrumental	*anmane	*anmambim	*anmambis
Locative	*anmani	*anmambim	*anmambis

==== *s-stem nouns ====
Generally,*s-stems contain an *-es-, which becomes *-os in the nominative singular: *teges- 'house' > *tegos.

E.g.*tegos "house" (neuter)

Case	Singular	Dual	Plural
Nominative	*tegos	*tegese	*tegesa
Vocative	*tegos	*tegese	*tegesa
Accusative	*tegos	*tegese	*tegesa
Genitive	*tegesos	*tegesou	*tegesom
Dative	*tegesi	*tegesobom	*tegesobos
Ablative	*tegesī	*tegesobim	*tegesobis
Instrumental	*tegese	*tegesobim	*tegesobis
Locative	*tegesi	*tegesobim	*tegesobis

==== *r-stem nouns ====
- r-stems are rare and principally confined to names of relatives. Typically they end in *-ter-, which becomes *-tīr in the nominative and *-tr- in all other cases aside from the accusative: *ɸater- 'father' > *ɸatīr, *ɸatros.

E.g. *ɸatīr 'father' (masculine)

Case	Singular	Dual	Plural
Nominative	*ɸatīr	*ɸatere	*ɸateres
Vocative	*ɸatīr	*ɸatere	*ɸateres
Accusative	*ɸateram	*ɸatere	*ɸaterās
Genitive	*ɸatros	*ɸatrou	*ɸatrom
Dative	*ɸatrei	*ɸatrebom	*ɸatrebos
Ablative	*ɸatrī	*ɸatrebim	*ɸatrebis
Instrumental	*ɸatre	*ɸatrebim	*ɸatrebis
Locative	*ɸatri	*ɸatrebim	*ɸatrebis

E.g. *mātīr 'mother' (feminine)

Case	Singular	Dual	Plural
Nominative	*mātīr	*mātere	*māteres
Vocative	*mātīr	*mātere	*māteres
Accusative	*māteram	*mātere	*māterās
Genitive	*mātros	*mātrou	*mātrom
Dative	*mātrei	*mātrebom	*mātrebos
Ablative	*mātrī	*mātrebim	*mātrebis
Instrumental	*mātre	*mātrebim	*mātrebis
Locative	*mātri	*mātrebim	*mātrebis

=== Pronouns ===
The following personal pronouns in Celtic can be reconstructed as follows:

Case	First-person		Second-person	
Case	Singular	Plural	Singular	Plural
Nominative	*mī	*snī	*tū	*swī
Accusative	*me (Note: Remade as *mu in the prehistory of Irish by analogy to *tu.)	*snos	*tu	*swes
Genitive	*mene (Note: Remade as *mowe in the prehistory of Irish by analogy to *towe.)	?	*towe	?

The following third-person pronouns in Proto-Celtic may also be reconstructed.

Case	Singular			Plural
Case	Masculine	Feminine	Neuter	Plural
Nominative	*es, *ēs	*sī	*ed	*eyes
Accusative	*em	*seyam? *sīm?	*ed	*sūs
Genitive	*esyo	*esyās	*esyo	*ēsom? *esom?
Dative Instrumental Locative	*e(s)yōi	*esyāi	*e(s)yōi	*ēbis

Forms of the masculine singular relative pronoun *yo- can be found in the first Botorrita plaque: The form io-s in line 10 is the nominative singular masculine of the relative pronoun from Proto-Indo-European *yo- (Sanskrit ya-, Greek hos), which shows up in Old Irish only as the aspiration for leniting relative verb forms. Line 7 has the accusative singular io-m and the dative singular io-mui of the same root.

=== Adjectives ===
Adjectives in Proto-Celtic had positive, comparative, superlative and equative degrees of comparison.

==== Positive-degree inflection classes ====
Four inflection classes for positive-degree adjectives are known. Most adjectives belonged to the o-ā class, in which the adjectives inflected like masculine o-stems, neuter o-stems and feminine ā-stems when agreeing with nouns of their respective genders. A much smaller minority of adjectives were i- and u-stems.

Consonant-stem adjectives also existed but were vanishingly rare, with only relics in Old Irish like té "hot" < *teɸents.

==== Comparative degree ====
The comparative degree was formed on most adjectives by attaching *-yūs to the adjective stem. For instance, *senos "old" would have a comparative *senyūs "older". However, some Caland system adjectives instead had a comparative ending in *-is, which was then extended to *-ais. For example, *ɸlitanos "wide" had a comparative *ɸletais.

==== Superlative degree ====
The superlative was formed by simply attaching *-isamos to the adjective stem. In some adjectives where the stem ends in *s, the suffix is truncated to *-(s)amos by haplology. Thus, *senos "old" would have a superlative *senisamos "oldest" but *trexsnos (stem *trexs-) would have a superlative *trexsamos.

=== Verbs ===
From comparison between early Old Irish and Gaulish forms it seems that Continental and Insular Celtic verbs developed differently and so the study of Irish and Welsh may have unduly weighted past opinion of Proto-Celtic verb morphology. It can be inferred from Gaulish and Celtiberian as well as Insular Celtic that the Proto-Celtic verb had at least three moods:

- indicative — seen in e.g. 1st sg. Gaulish delgu "I hold", Old Irish tongu "I swear"
- imperative — seen in e.g. 3rd sg. Celtiberian usabituz, Gaulish appisetu
- subjunctive — seen in e.g. 3rd sg. Gaulish buetid "may he be", Celtiberian asekati

and four tenses:

- present — seen in e.g. Gaulish uediíu-mi "I pray", Celtiberian zizonti "they sow"
- preterite — seen in e.g. 3rd sg. Gaulish sioxti, Lepontic KariTe
- imperfect — perhaps in Celtiberian kombalkez, atibion
- future — seen in e.g. 3rd sg. Gaulish bissiet, Old Irish bieid "he shall be"

A probable optative mood also features in Gaulish (tixsintor) and an infinitive (with a characteristic ending -unei) in Celtiberian.

Verbs were formed by adding suffixes to a verbal stem. The stem might be thematic or athematic, an open or a closed syllable.

==== Primary endings ====
The primary endings in Proto-Celtic were as follows. They were used to form the present, future, and subjunctive conjugations.

Proto-Celtic primary endings
Person and number	Basic endings		Thematic present	
Person and number	Active	Mediopassive	Active	Mediopassive
1st sg.	*-ū (thematic) *-mi (athematic)	*-ūr	*-ū	*-ūr
2nd sg.	*-si	*-tar	*-esi	*-etar
3rd sg.	*-ti	*-tor	*-eti	*-etor
1st pl.	*-mosi	*-mor	*-omosi	*-omor
2nd pl.	*-tesi	*-dwe	*-etesi	*-edwe
3rd pl.	*-nti	*-ntor	*-onti	*-ontor

==== Present-stem formations ====
Proto-Celtic possessed a diverse set of ways to form present stems. They can be roughly be divided into two broad categories of athematic and thematic.

- Thematic verbs feature a connecting vowel between the present stem and the basic primary endings. This vowel is -o- in the first-person and third-person plural and -e- in the third-person singular and second-person forms. The first-person singular of these verbs end in *-ū.
- Athematic verbs feature no such connecting vowel, and their 1st-person singular forms end in *-mi instead of *-ū.

These two inflectional categories can themselves be subdivided based on the means of derivation from a verb root via a combination of root ablaut grades and suffixes. These derivational classes include:

Derivational classes of Proto-Celtic verbs
Inflectional class	Root ablaut	Affix	Class	KPV designation
Thematic	e-grade	(none)	Simple thematic	A-1
Thematic	e-grade	*-ye-	e-grade *-ye-	A-5
Thematic	e-grade	*-de-	e-grade *-de-	A-6
Thematic	o-grade	*-ī- *-eyo-	*-eye- causative/iterative	(none)
Thematic	zero grade	(none)	Thematized root athematic	A-2
Thematic	zero grade	(none)	tudáti-type thematic	A-2
Thematic	zero grade	*-ske-	*-ske- inchoative	A-3
Thematic	zero grade	*-ye-	zero-grade *-ye-	A-4
Thematic	zero grade	Nasal infix	Aniṭ-root nasal-infix	A-8
Thematic	zero grade	i-reduplication	i-reduplicated present	A-15
Thematic	(varied)	*-āye-	Denominative	(none)
Athematic	e-grade	(none)	CeRH-root present	A-13
Athematic	zero grade	*-na- (when levelled)	seṭ-root nasal-infix	A-8
Athematic	zero grade	*-nu-	*-new- present	A-10
Athematic	zero grade	*-ī-	essive	A-7
Athematic	(varied)	*-ā-	factitive	(none)

==== Nasal-infix presents ====
In Proto-Celtic, the Indo-European nasal infix presents split into two categories: ones originally derived from laryngeal-final roots (i.e. seṭ roots in Sanskrit), and ones that were not (i.e. from aniṭ roots). In seṭ verbs, the nasal appears at the end of the present stem, while in aniṭ-derived verbs the nasal was followed by a root-final stop (generally -g- in Old Irish).

===== To aniṭ roots =====
Aniṭ nasal infix verbs conjugated exactly like basic thematic verbs in the present tense.

However, the origin of the invariant root vowel in -o- in *CewC- roots in Old Irish is unclear. Usually, it is held that the consonantism in these verbs was generalized in favour of the plural stem *CunC- in Old Irish. One would expect alternation between o in the 1st- and 3rd- person plural and -u- elsewhere in the present; but for both contexts Old Irish only attests -o-.

The following verbs can be reconstructed in this class:

- To *CeyC- roots: *dingeti, *grindeti, *indeti, *linkʷeti
- Double-nasal presents: *ganndeti, *glanndeti, *skanndeti
- To *CewC- roots: *bundeti, *bungeti, *dlungeti, *exsstungeti, *lungeti, *rundeti, *slunketi, *tungeti, *unketi
- Others: *annketi, *dringeti

===== To seṭ roots =====
On the other hand, the seṭ presents originally had a long vowel after the nasal in the singular and -a- after the nasal in the plural, but the attested Celtic languages levelled this alternation away. Gaulish shows traces of the singular long-vowel vocalism while Old Irish generalized the plural -a- to the singular.

The seṭ nasal-infix presents were further subdivided into subcategories based on the root-final laryngeal. Traditionally two subclasses have long been accepted, the *h₁ subclass (cited with a -ni- suffix) and *h₂ (cited with a -na- suffix). *h₃ nasal-infixed verbs were often leveled to act like *h₂ verbs, being also cited with a -na- suffix; the only original difference between the two would have been the 3rd-person plural ending in *-nonti instead of *-nanti.

The nasal-infix seṭ verbs in Proto-Celtic underwent multiple levelings. First, the suffixal vowel in the plural forms was harmonized so that they would all be the short counterpart to the vowel in the singular forms. Then all the long vowels in the singular were shortened to make the suffix vowel identical in quality and length across all person-number combinations.

Evolution of Proto-Celtic ablaut in the nasal infix for seṭ roots
Person and number	Pre-leveling			Leveling of vowel quality		Leveling of vowel length	
Person and number	*h₁ verbs	*h₂ verbs	*h₃ verbs	*h₁ verbs	*h₂ and *h₃ verbs	*h₁ verbs	*h₂ and *h₃ verbs
1st sg.	*-nīmi	*-nāmi	*-nāmi	*-nīmi	*-nāmi	*-nimi	*-nami
2nd sg.	*-nīsi	*-nāsi	*-nāsi	*-nīsi	*-nāsi	*-nisi	*-nasi
3rd sg.	*-nīti	*-nāti	*-nāti	*-nīti	*-nāti	*-niti	*-nati
1st pl.	*-namosi	*-namosi	*-namosi	*-nimosi	*-namosi	*-nimosi	*-namosi
2nd pl.	*-natesi	*-natesi	*-natesi	*-nitesi	*-natesi	*-nitesi	*-natesi
3rd pl.	*-nenti	*-nanti	*-nonti	*-ninti	*-nanti	*-ninti	*-nanti

The following seṭ-root nasal presents are reconstructible for Proto-Celtic:

- *h₁-final roots:
  - -ni- relics: *balnīti, *tinīti, *dalnīti
  - Converted to -na- before Old Irish: *dinīti, *winīti, *kʷalnīti
- *h₂ subclass: *kʷrināti, *rināti, *damnāti, *bināti (?), *tlināti, *ɸalnāti, *marnāti, *sannāti, *swannāti
- *h₃-final roots: *ɸarnāti, *gnināti, *starnāti
- Semivowel-final aniṭ root: *kriniti, *klinutor
- Unknown laryngeal: *glinati, *linati, *barnati, *walnator

==== Preterite formations ====
There were two or three major preterite formations in Proto-Celtic, plus another moribund type.

- The s-preterite
- The reduplicated suffixless preterite (originating from the PIE reduplicated stative)
- The t-preterite
- The root aorist

The s-, t-, and root aorist preterites take Indo-European secondary endings, while the reduplicated suffix preterite took stative endings. These endings are:

Proto-Celtic preterite endings
Person and number	Ending type	
Person and number	Secondary endings	Stative endings
1st sg.	*-am	*-a
2nd sg.	*-s	*-as
3rd sg.	*-t	*-e
1st pl.	*-mo(s)	*-mo
2nd pl.	*-te(s)	*-te
3rd pl.	*-ant	*-ar

===== t-preterite =====
The Old Irish t-preterite was traditionally assumed to be a divergent evolution from the s-preterite, but that derivation was challenged by Jay Jasanoff, who alleges that they were instead imperfects of Narten presents. Either derivation requires Narten ablaut anyway, leading to a stem vowel i in the singular and e in the plural. The stem vowel in the t-preterite was leveled to *e if the next consonant was either velar or *m, and *i in front of *r or *l.

===== Suffixless preterites =====
A number of suffixless preterite formations featured reduplication. The nature of the reduplication depends on the structure of the root.

Proto-Celtic suffixless preterites
Root	Meaning	Shape	Preterite stem	Notes
*keng-	"to step"	Other root types	*ke-kong-	Classic Indo-European reduplication, where the root is put in the o-grade and the prefixed reduplicant is formed with the first consonant followed by *e.
*nigʷ-	"to wash"	*C(R)eiT-	*ni-noig-	In Proto-Celtic, roots with a semivowel (PIE *-y- or *-w-) before a non-laryngeal consonant have the reduplicant formed not with the first consonant of the root followed by *e, but instead the first consonant of the root followed by the semivowel. The root itself remains in the o-grade.
*duk-	"to lead, carry"	*C(R)euT-	*du-douk-	In Proto-Celtic, roots with a semivowel (PIE *-y- or *-w-) before a non-laryngeal consonant have the reduplicant formed not with the first consonant of the root followed by *e, but instead the first consonant of the root followed by the semivowel. The root itself remains in the o-grade.
*gʷed-	"to pray"	*CeT-	*gʷād-	Roots ending in only a single stop as their coda generally merely change the stem vowel to *ā to form their preterite, without apparent reduplication. It originally spread from *ād- (from *h₁e-h₁od-), the preterite stem for *ed- "to eat".
*kerd-	"to throw, put"	*CeRT-	*kard-	A few roots in *CeRT- also had the *CeT- preterite formation applied to them but the long *ā was shortened due to Osthoff's law.
*dā-	"to give"	*C(C)eH-	*de-dū (singular) *ded(a)- (plural)	Laryngeal-final roots produced long vowels in the root syllable in the singular, but not in the plural (where the root was in the zero-grade instead). Usually the singular stem was generalized in Celtic, but in these cases the plural stem was generalized.
*kʷri-	"to buy"	*C(R)eiH-	*kʷi-kʷr-	The treatment for *CeH- roots was also extended to *C(R)eiH- roots. Due to the roots' semivowel, the reduplicant also contains the semivowel.

==== Future formations ====
One major formation of the future in Celtic, the s-future, is possibly a descendant of the Proto-Indo-European (h₁)se-desiderative, with i-reduplication in multiple verbs. The Old Irish a- and s-future may derive from this same Proto-Indo-European paradigm. According to the philologist Calvin Watkins, certain Old Irish s-future forms may have emerged from a type of Proto-Indo-European desiderative class in which the initial consonant was reduplicated with an intervening i-vowel followed by a sigmatic suffix with the accent placed on the thematic vowel. For instance, Watkins reconstructs a pre-form *gʷʰigʷʰr̥- (from the root *gʷʰer-) as the ancestor of the Old Irish future form géra. The linguists Eugen Hill and Jay Jasanoff compare this formation to the reduplicated desiderative of Indo-Iranian (e.g. Sanskrit bíbhitsati) and reconstruct an originally thematic paradigm. Hill, in particular, cites the Old Irish term rigid, for which he reconstructs a Proto-Celtic form *ri-rix-sū, itself perhaps—according to Hill—from pre-Proto-Celtic *ri-riǵ-sō. The linguist Frederick Kortlandt further proposes that the reduplicated future of Old Irish may parallel several reduplicated forms in Italic, such as Oscan fifikus. However, Kortlandt alternatively suggests that the s-future and s-subjunctive ultimately derive from the Proto-Indo-European sigmatic aorist and reflect an athematic paradigm. Kortlandt argues that this older athematic inflection was then replaced by secondary thematic endings. Thus, Kortlandt derives Old Irish future forms such as fessa from *wiweksom and geiss from *gʷedses. Moreover, Kortlandt notes the existence of a full-grade Old Irish future form gignethar and a zero-grade form géna, which may parallel Sanskrit jíjaniṣate and jíghāṃsati respectively. According to Kortlandt, the recessive accent of both forms and the full-grade of the former indicate an originally athematic inflection. Jasanoff argues that whereas the Old Irish reduplicated future derives from a thematic source, the unreduplicated s-future is etymologically connected to the Sabellic athematic future (e.g. Oscan fust), both of which—according to Jasanoff—hold athematic origins. Another future formation, attested only in Gaulish, is the -sye-desiderative.

==== Subjunctive formations ====
Most verbs took one subjunctive suffix in Proto-Celtic, -(a)s-, followed by the thematic primary endings. The subjunctive in Proto-Celtic was a descendant of the subjunctive of an Indo-European sigmatic formation *-seti. The -ase- variant originated in roots that ended in a laryngeal in Proto-Indo-European; when the *-se- suffix was attached right after a laryngeal, the laryngeal regularly vocalized into *-a-. It would then analogically spread to other Celtic strong verb roots ending in sonorants in addition to the weak verbs, even if the root did not originally end in a laryngeal.

There were also two, possibly three verbs that did not use -(a)se-, instead straight-out taking thematised primary endings. They are: *bwiyeti "to be, exist" (subjunctive *bweti), *klinutor "to hear" (subjunctive *klowetor), and possibly *ɸalnati “to approach, drive” (subjunctive *ɸeleti).

Primary subjunctive formations in Proto-Celtic generally use the e-grade of the verb root, even if the present stem uses the zero-grade.

==== Imperative formation ====
Imperative endings in Proto-Celtic were as follows:

Imperative endings in Proto-Celtic
Person and number	Active endings	
Person and number	Basic endings	With thematic vowels
2nd sg.	-∅, *-si	*-e
3rd sg.	*-tou, *-tūd, *-tu	*-etou, *-etūd, *-etu
1st pl.	*-mo(s)	*-omo(s)
2nd pl.	*-te(s)	*-ete(s)
3rd pl.	*-ntou, *-ntu	*-ontou, *-ontu

===== Second-person singular imperative =====
The second-person singular imperative was generally endingless in the active; no ending was generally added to athematic verbs. On thematic -e/o- verbs, the imperative ended in thematic vowel *-e. However, there is also another second-person singular active imperative ending, -si, which was attached to the verb root athematically even with thematic strong verbs.

The thematic deponent second-person singular imperative ending was *-eso. The -the in Old Irish is secondary.

===== Third-person imperative =====
The third-person imperative endings in Insular Celtic, Gaulish and Celtiberian have completely separate origins from each other. The Insular Celtic endings are derived from *-tou, *-ntou, Gaulish endings from *-tu, *-ntu, and the Celtiberian third-person imperative singular ending stems from *-tūd.

==== Example conjugations ====
Scholarly reconstructions may be summarised in tabular format.

Conjugation like *bere/o- 'bear, carry, flow'
	Person	Present		Imperfect		Future		Past	
	Person	Active	Medio- passive	Active	Medio- passive	Active	Medio- passive	Active	Medio- passive
Indicative	1st sg.	*berū	*berūr	*beremam	—	*bibrāsū	*bibrāsūr	*bīram	—
Indicative	2nd sg.	*beresi	*beretar	*beretās	—	*bibrāsesi	*bibrāsetar	*birs	—
Indicative	3rd sg.	*bereti	*beretor	*bereto	—	*bibrāseti	*bibrāsetor	*birt	?
Indicative	1st pl.	*beromosi	*beromor	*beremo	—	*bibrāsomosi	*bibrāsomor	*berme	—
Indicative	2nd pl.	*beretesi	*beredwe	?	—	*bibrāsete	*bibrāsedwe	*berte	—
Indicative	3rd pl.	*beronti	*berontor	*berento	—	*bibrāsonti	*bibrāsontor	*berant	?
Subjunctive	1st sg.	*berasū	*berasūr	—	—	—	—	—	—
Subjunctive	2nd sg.	*berasesi	*berasetar	—	—	—	—	—	—
Subjunctive	3rd sg.	*beraseti	*berasetor	—	—	—	—	—	—
Subjunctive	1st pl.	*berasomosi	*berasomor	—	—	—	—	—	—
Subjunctive	2nd pl.	*berasetesi	*berasedwe	—	—	—	—	—	—
Subjunctive	3rd pl.	*berasonti	*berasontor	—	—	—	—	—	—
Imperative	2nd sg.	*bere	*bereso	—	—	—	—	—	—
Imperative	3rd sg.	*beretou	?	—	—	—	—	—	—
Imperative	1st pl.	*beromos	?	—	—	—	—	—	—
Imperative	2nd pl.	*berete	?	—	—	—	—	—	—
Imperative	3rd pl.	*berontou	?	—	—	—	—	—	—
Participle		*beronts	*beromnos	—	—	—	—	*bertyos	*britos

==== Copula ====
The copula *esti was irregular. It had both athematic and thematic conjugations in the present tense. Schrijver supposes that its athematic present was used clause-initially and the thematic conjugation was used when that was not the case.

Conjugation of *esti in Proto-Celtic
Person	Present	
Person	Athematic	Thematic
1st sg.	*esmi	*esū
2nd sg.	*esi	*esesi
3rd sg.	*esti	*eseti
1st pl.	*esmosi	*esomosi
2nd pl.	**estes	*esetes
3rd pl.	*senti	**esonti

== Numerals ==
Numeral	PIE			PC		
Numeral	M.	F.	N.	M.	F.	N.
1	*h₁óynos	*h₁óyneh₂	*h₁óynom	*oinos	*oinā	*oinom
2	*dwóh₁	*dwéh₂h₁(e)	*dwóy(h₁)	*duwo	*dwei	*duwo
3	*tréyes	*tísres	*tríh₂	*trīs	*tisres	*trī
4	*kʷetwóres	*kʷétesres	*kʷetwṓr	*kʷetwores	*kʷetesres	*kʷetwor?
5	*pénkʷe			*kʷenkʷe		
6	*swéḱs			*swexs		
7	*septḿ̥			*seɸtam > *sextam		
8	*oḱtṓw			*oxtū		
9	*h₁néwn̥			*nowan		
10	*déḱm̥			*dekam		
20	*wídḱm̥ti			*wikantī		
30	*tridḱómt			*trīkontes		
40	*kʷétwr̥dḱomt			*kʷetrVkonts / *kʷetrVkontes		
50	*pénkʷedḱomt			*kʷenkʷekonts / *kʷenkʷekontes		
60	*swéḱsdḱomt			*swexskonts / *swexskontes		
90	*h₁néwn̥dḱomt			*naukontes		
100	*ḱm̥tóm			*kantom		

== Vocabulary ==
The vast majority of reliably reconstructible lexical items in Proto-Celtic have good Indo-European etymologies, unlike what is found in, for example, the Greek language—at least 90% according to Matasovic. These include most of the items on the Swadesh list of basic vocabulary. But a few words that do not have Indo-European cognates, so may be borrowings from substrate or adstrate Pre-Indo-European languages, are also from basic vocabulary, including *bodyo- ‘yellow’ (though this has possible cognates in Italic), *kani "good," and *klukka "stone." It is notable that fully 32 items have been reconstructed for Proto-Celtic with the meaning "fight."

== Examples of morphology derivation from PIE ==
=== Two examples of verbs ===
(The following examples lack the dual plural and are conjugated in the present tense)

"To bear/carry"
Pronoun	PIE	PC
1st Sg.	*bʰéroh₂	*berū
2nd Sg.	*bʰéresi	*beresi
3rd Sg.	*bʰéreti	*bereti
1st Pl.	*bʰéromos	*beromosi
2nd Pl.	*bʰérete	*beretesi
3rd Pl.	*bʰéronti	*beronti

"To be" (athematic version)
Pronoun	PIE	PC
1st Sg.	*h₁ésmi	*esmi
2nd Sg.	*h₁ési	*esi
3rd Sg.	*h₁ésti	*esti
1st Pl.	*h₁smós	*esmosi
2nd Pl.	*h₁sté	*estes
3rd Pl.	*h₁sénti	*senti

=== Examples of noun declension ===
(The following examples lack the dual number)

==== Masculine noun ====
"Bear"
Case	Singular		Plural	
Case	PIE	PC	PIE	PC
Nom.	*h₂ŕ̥tḱos	*artos	*h₂ŕ̥tḱoes	*artoi
Voc.	*h₂ŕ̥tḱe	*arte	*h₂ŕ̥tḱoes	*artūs
Acc.	*h₂ŕ̥tḱom	*artom	*h₂ŕ̥tḱoms	*artoms
Gen.	*h₂ŕ̥tḱosyo	*artī	*h₂ŕ̥tḱoHom	*artom
Dat.	*h₂ŕ̥tḱoey	*artūi	*h₂ŕ̥tḱomos	*artobos
Loc.	*h₂ŕ̥tḱey	*artei	*h₂ŕ̥tḱoysu	?
Inst.	*h₂ŕ̥tḱoh₁	*artū	*h₂ŕ̥tḱōys	*artūis

==== Feminine noun ====
"Open land"
Case	Singular		Plural	
Case	PIE	PC	PIE	PC
Nom.	*ln̥dʰéh₂	*landā	*ln̥dʰéh₂es	*landās
Voc.	*ln̥dʰéh₂	*landā	*ln̥dʰéh₂es	*landās
Acc.	*ln̥dʰā́m	*landam	*ln̥dʰéh₂m̥s	*landāms
Gen.	*ln̥dʰéh₂s	*landās	*ln̥dʰéh₂oHom	*landom
Dat.	*ln̥dʰéh₂ey	*landāi	*ln̥dʰéh₂mos	*landābos
Loc.	*ln̥dʰéh₂i	*landai	*ln̥dʰéh₂su	?
Inst.	*ln̥dʰéh₂h₁	?	*ln̥dʰéh₂mis	*landābis

==== Neuter noun ====
"Yoke"
Case	Singular		Plural	
Case	PIE	PC	PIE	PC
Nom.	*yugóm	*yugom	*yugéh₂	*yugā
Voc.	*yugóm	*yugom	*yugéh₂	*yugā
Acc.	*yugóm	*yugom	*yugéh₂	*yugā
Gen.	*yugósyo	*yugī	*yugóHom	*yugom
Dat.	*yugóey	*yugūi	*yugómos	*yugobos
Loc.	*yugéy	*yugei	*yugóysu	?
Inst.	*yugóh₁	*yugū	*yugṓys	*yugūis

=== An example of adjectival declension ===
(The following example lacks the dual number)

"High (Singular)"
Case	Masculine		Feminine		Neuter	
Case	PIE	PC	PIE	PC	PIE	PC
Nom.	*h₂ḱrós	*akros	*h₂ḱréh₂	*akrā	*h₂ḱróm	*akrom
Voc.	*h₂ḱré	*akre	*h₂ḱréh₂	*akrā	*h₂ḱróm	*akrom
Acc.	*h₂ḱróm	*akrom	*h₂ḱrā́m	*akram	*h₂ḱróm	*akrom
Gen.	*h₂ḱrósyo	*akrī	*h₂ḱréh₂s	*akrās	*h₂ḱrósyo	*akrī
Dat.	*h₂ḱróey	*akrūi	*h₂ḱréh₂ey	*akrai	*h₂ḱróey	*akrūi
Inst.	*h₂ḱróh₁	*akrū	*h₂ḱréh₂h₁	?	*h₂ḱróh₁	*akrū

"High (Plural)"
Case	Masculine		Feminine		Neuter	
Case	PIE	PC	PIE	PC	PIE	PC
Nom.	*h₂ḱróes	*akroi	*h₂ḱréh₂es	*akrās	*h₂ḱréh₂	*akrā
Voc.	*h₂ḱróes	*akroi	*h₂ḱréh₂es	*akrās	*h₂ḱréh₂	*akrā
Acc.	*h₂ḱróms	*akroms	*h₂ḱréh₂m̥s	*akrams	*h₂ḱréh₂	*akrā
Gen.	*h₂ḱróHom	*akrom	*h₂ḱréh₂oHom	*akrom	*h₂ḱróHom	*akrom
Dat.	*h₂ḱrómos	*akrobos	*h₂ḱréh₂mos	*akrābos	*h₂ḱrómos	*akrobis
Inst.	*h₂ḱrṓys	*akrobis	*h₂ḱréh₂mis	*akrābis	*h₂ḱrṓys	*akrobis

=== Derivation of personal pronouns (nominative case) from PIE ===
No.	Pronoun	PIE	PC
Sg.	1st	*éǵ > *me [acc.]	*mī
Sg.	2nd	*túh₂	*tū
Sg.	3rd M.	*ís	*se
Sg.	3rd F.	*seh₂ > *sih₂ [*só + *-ih₂]	*sī
Sg.	3rd N.	*íd	*ed
Pl.	1st	*wéy > *nos [acc.] > *nēs	*snīs; *snīsnīs
Pl.	2nd	*yū́ > *wos [acc.] > *wēs	*swīs; *swīswīs
Pl.	3rd	*éyes	*eyes

== See also ==
- Beaker culture
- Hallstatt culture
- La Tène culture
- Goidelic substrate hypothesis
- Ligures
- Azilian
