= Neto (deity) =

Iberian deity associated with Mars

Neto or Mars Neto is the name of one of the deities of ancient Iberian Peninsula. It was revered in many places of the Peninsula, but mainly by the Iberians and Celtiberians. He was probably a god of war.

== Name and functions ==
Macrobius in his Saturnalia, calls Neto both a sun god and equivalent in Hispania to the Roman Mars and Apollo. A name Neito appears on the Celtiberian Botorrita bronze plaque. The name also recalls an Irish war god Neit whose name might be derived from the same Celtic root meaning passion or conflict.
