= Luzaga =

Luzaga, Spain
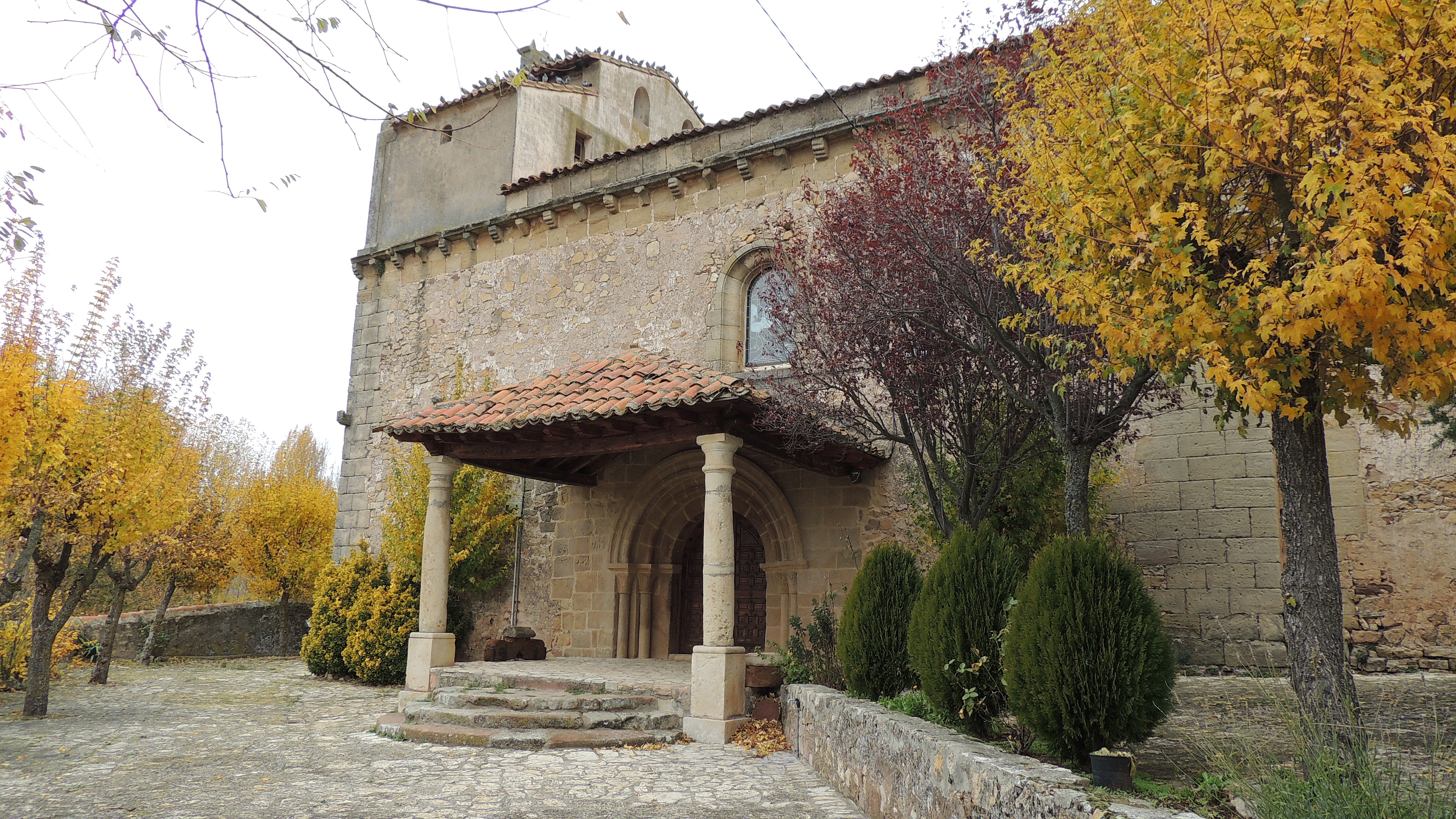
- Romanesque church in Luzaga

- Coat of arms

- Location within Province of Guadalajara Location within Castilla-La Mancha Location within Spain
- Country: Spain
- Autonomous community: Castile-La Mancha
- Province: Guadalajara
- Municipality: Luzaga

Area
  - Total: 29.70 km^{2} (11.47 sq mi)
- Elevation: 1,072 m (3,517 ft)

Population (2025-01-01)
  - Total: 65
  - Density: 2.2/km^{2} (5.7/sq mi)
- Time zone: UTC+1 (CET)
  - Summer (DST): UTC+2 (CEST)

Luzaga is a village and municipality in the province of Guadalajara, Spain, part of the autonomous community of Castile-La Mancha. Luzaga's Bronze, one of the most significant known examples of Celtiberian script, was found here.
