= Botorrita =

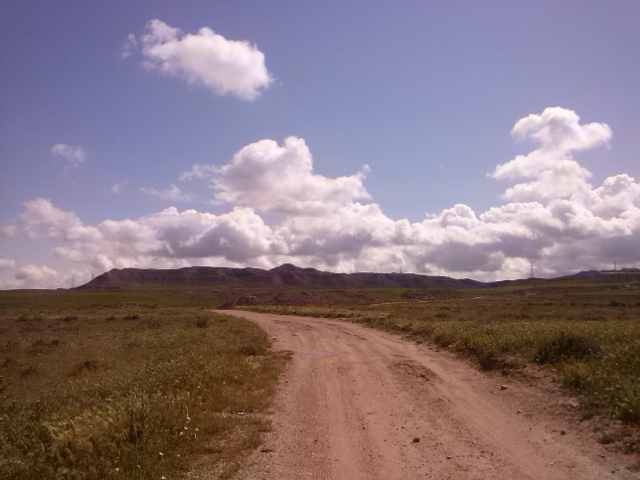

- Flag Coat of arms

- location in Spain. Botorrita (Spain) Botorrita (Europe)
- Coordinates: 41°30′54″N 1°1′55.20″W
- Country: Spain
- Autonomous community: Aragon
- Province: Zaragoza
- Comarca: Zaragoza

Government
  - Mayor: José María Castillo Vicente

Area
  - Total: 19.8 km^{2} (7.6 sq mi)
- Elevation: 394 m (1,293 ft)

Population (2025-01-01)
  - Total: 587
  - Density: 29.6/km^{2} (76.8/sq mi)
- Demonym: Botorritanos
- Time zone: UTC+1 (CET)
  - Summer (DST): UTC+2 (CEST)

Botorrita is a municipality of 574 residents located in the province of Zaragoza, Aragon, Spain.

Botorrita is known for the archeological artefacts found there, such as the Botorrita plaques.

The Romans knew it as Contrebia Belaisca (the first probably Celtiberian from *kom- + *treb(h) "the gathering (place)").

== See also ==
- List of municipalities in Zaragoza
