= Luzaga's Bronze =

Inscription in Celtiberian language

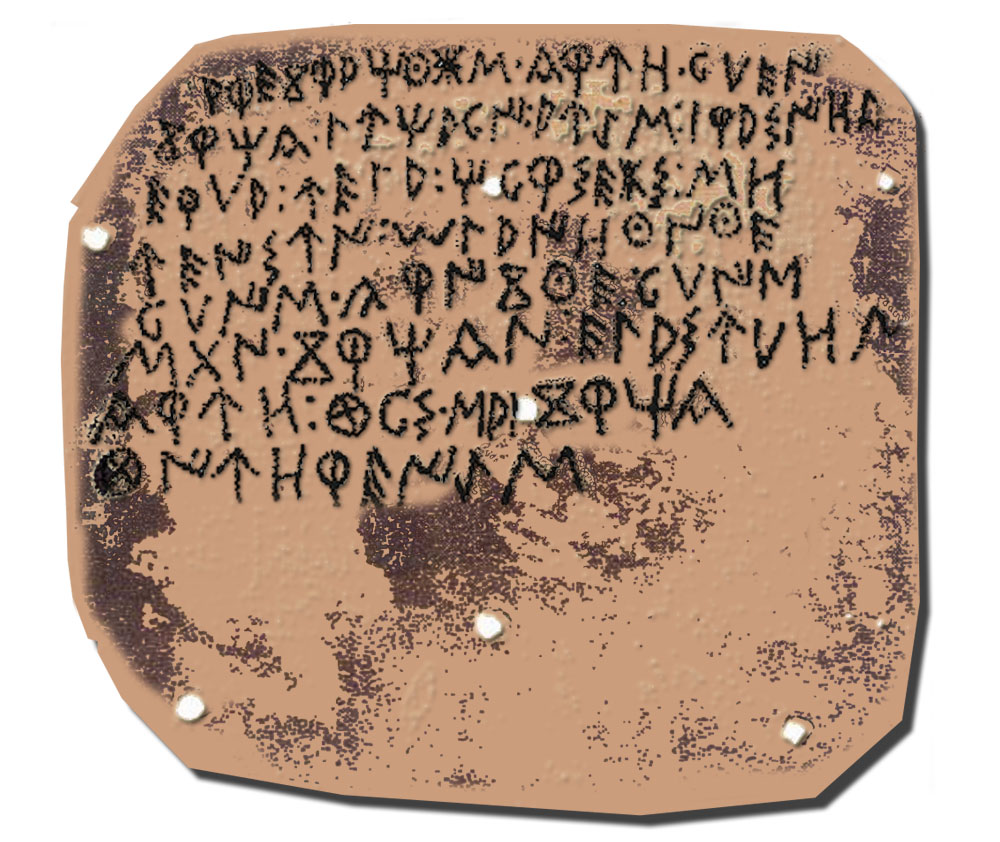
The Luzaga Bronze

The Bronze of Luzaga is a plate of 16 x 15 centimeters which has, in 8 lines, 123 Celtiberian characters engraved in the metal with a bradawl or similar, and which has 7 holes, perhaps in order to be held. Since its discovery in the late nineteenth century, it has been lost.

== Transcription ==
1. aregoratikubos : karuo : genei
2. gortika : lutiakei : aukis : barazioka
3. erna : uela : tigerzetaz : so
4. ueizui : belaiokumkue
5. genis : garikokue : genis
6. sdam : gortikam : elazunom
7. karuo : tegez : sa : gortika
8. teiuoreikis

(Jordán 2005)

== Notes ==
The sequence genei gortika (lines 1-2) seems to parallel the forms es-keinis kortika in the second line of the Uxama tessera:

boruoture[i]ka : tureibo[s]
eskeinis : kortica
usama : antos
saikios : baisais
kaltaikikos

In lines 2 and 7 the form gort-ik-a and in 6 gort-ik-am may be from Indo-European *ghorto- (whence also English garden, Latin hortus...) > Proto-Celtic *gorto- meaning "enclosed place" also seen in Old Irish gort "field." Note also that the place name Gorze is probably from a related but unattested Gaulish *gortia. Or gortika may mean "mandatory, required" from *gʰor-ti-ka; compare Latin ex-horto "exhort" from *ex-gʰor-to). But Schrijver derives gortika from Proto-Celtic *g^{w}ortikā from a PIE root starting in *g^{wh}-, with the meaning 'object of exchange', cf. Middle Welsh gwarthec 'cattle.'

The next form in line 2, lutiak-ei "in Luzaga," is one of only three survivals of the locative case in all of Celtic (the other two also are in Celtiberian; see below.) Also in line 2, aukis may be related to augu seen in the line 2 of the third Botorrita plaque: soz augu arestalo damai (probably 'all this [is made] valid by order of the established authority'), meaning "valid" < *h₂eug-os 'strong, valid', cf. Latin augustus 'solemn'.

The first element of tiger-zetaz in line 3 may be connected to the Proto-Celtic root *tigerno- "lord, master" (Old Irish tigern, Ogam TIGIRN, Middle Welsh teyrn, and the Gaulish place name (Castrum ) Tigernum).

The forms belai-okum-kue in line 4 and gar-iko[m]-kue in line 5 seem to be conjoined genitive plurals (-ok-um) probably indicating tribal names or place names, and both ending with a clitic copula (-kue); both -ikom and -okum are also common endings of forms on the Botorrita plaque. These and the repeated forms beginning gen- (genei in line 1 and genis twice in line 5) which closely parallels kentis "son" in the Botorrita plaque, suggest that many of the forms in this inscription are names.

In line 4, ueizui seems to be a palatalized variant of ueitui seen in the second line of the Cortono bronze (the last word of which may contain one of the only survivals of the PIE locative case in Celtic: bundalos korton-ei "Bundalos in Cortono"--korton-o in the first line is the genitive singular of the same form):

]rDAs : oTAi : kortono :
alaTAi : atiko : ueitui
arGAtobezom : loutu
louKAiteitubos : tures
bunDAlos : kortonei

The form sdam in line 6 seems to be an accusative form of a determiner, probably related to the Insular Celtic determiner *sind-. In the same line, the form elazunom appears in a variant form (different case and/or gender?) in the third Botorrita plaque, line 2.57: elazuna ensikum turo.

The form tegez in line 7 is discussed by Matasovic under the Proto-Celtic root *teg-os "house." He notes that it is "completely obscure, not only with respect to meaning, but also grammatically: is it a verb in the 3 sg. preterite, or the Abl. sg. of a root noun?" The form atiko probably modifying kortono may contain the same root, if from *ad-tego so together "roofed (or partly roofed) garden or enclosure" perhaps "courtyard."

The second element of teiuo-reikis in line 8 has been connected with the Celtic (and Proto-Indo-European) word for "king," *rig- < *h_{3}re:g-, but there are phonological problems (-ei- should be -i-) and morphological problems (the ending looks like the nominative of an -i- stem, unattested for this form elsewhere in Celtic). The form is seen in Gaulish names such as Catu-rix, one of which, Devorix may be an exact cognate to the form here. An Old Irish Ogham inscription shows the form Voteco-rigas. The same element may be seen in the first word of the Uxama tessera above: boruotu-re[i]ka (though Jordán 2005 has a different reading of this form).
