= Botorrita plaque =

Four Celtiberian bronze plaques from 2nd-century-BC Spain

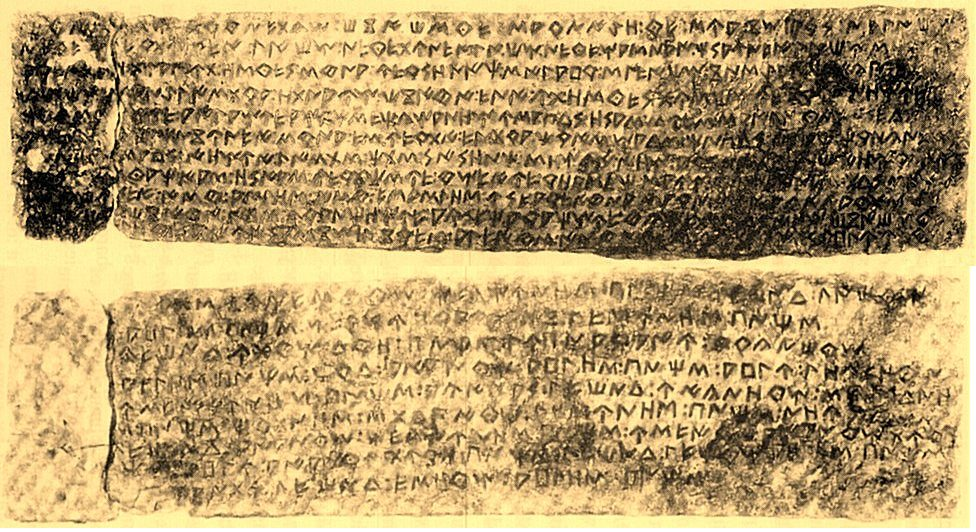
Photograph of Botorrita I (both sides)

The Botorrita plaques are four bronze plaques discovered in Botorrita (Roman Contrebia Belaisca), near Zaragoza, Spain, dating to the late 2nd century BC, known as Botorrita I, II, III and IV.

Although Botorrita II is in the Latin language, Botorrita I, III and IV, inscribed in the Celtiberian script, constitute the main part of the Celtiberian corpus.

== Botorrita I ==
Botorrita I was found in 1970. It is the longest inscription in Celtiberian consisting of a text in 11 lines, on the front face, continued by a list of names on the back side.

=== Side A ===
A.1. tirikantam berkunetakam tokoitoskue sarnikio kue sua kombalkez nelitom
A.2. nekue [u]ertaunei litom nekue taunei litom nekue masnai tizaunei litom soz auku
A.3. arestaio tamai uta oskues stena uerzoniti silabur sleitom konskilitom kabizeti
A.4. kantom sankilistara otanaum tokoitei eni: uta oskuez boustomue koruinomue
A.5. makasiamue ailamue ambitiseti kamanom usabituz ozas sues sailo kusta bizetuz iom
A.6. asekati ambitinkounei stena es uertai entara tiris matus tinbituz neito tirikantam
A.7. eni onsatuz iomui listas titas zizonti somui iom arznas bionti iom kustaikos
A.8. arznas kuati ias ozias uertatosue temeiue robiseti saum tekametinas tatuz somei
A.9. enitouzei iste ankios iste esankios uze areitena sarnikiei akainakubos
A.10. nebintor tokoitei ios ur antiomue auzeti aratimue tekametam tatuz iom tokoitoskue
A.11. sarnikiokue aiuizas kombalkores aleites iste ikues ruzimuz abulu ubokum

=== Side B ===
B.1. lubos kounesikum melnunos bintis letontu litokum
B.2. abulos bintis melmu barauzanko lesunos bintis
B.3. letontu ubokum turo bintis lubinaz aiu berkantikum
B.4. abulos bintis tirtu aiankum abulos bintis abulu louzokum
B.5. uzeisunos bintis akainaz letontu uikanokum suostuno/s
B.6. bintis tirtanos statulikum lesunos bintis nouantutaz
B.7. letontu aiankum melmunos bintis useizu aiankum tauro [bin]/tis
B.8. abulu aiankum tauro bintis letontu letikum abulos bintis
B.9. [ ]ukontaz letontu esokum abulos bintis

=== Translations ===
J. Eska (1988)

1. "Regarding a well-wrought boundary structure, the senators of Tocoitom and of Sarnicios [have agreed/decided that] [it is] not permitted"

2. "[that it] be demolished or destroyed or broken apart by violence." (from soz to tamai remains untranslated, probably a tag on the preceding prohibition)

3-4. "and whoever carries out these things, he should give cut [pieces] of silver [namely] 100 sanclistera of otanas at Tocoitom."

F. Villar (1990)

1. "In relation to the trescantos [named] Berkuneteca of Tokoit and Sarnicia, this is the settlement/accord:"

W. Meid (1983)

1. "Concerning the hilly region of Togoit and of the Sanricii, the following has been decreed as not allowed"

2. "It is not allowed to do [anything], neither is it allowed to perform/carry out [works], nor is it allowed to perpetrate breakage/harm" [except by permission of the directors]."

Rodriguez Adrados (1993)

1. "With regard to the place Tricanta ("the meeting of three roads" or "of three boundaries") of Togotus and of Sarnicius, the council [has determined] thus--[it is] forbidden:"

=== Notes ===
Although the general contents of the inscription are known with some confidence--apparently a set of prohibitions (nekue...litom "must neither...nor..." A.2 with litom < *l(e)ik-to, cf. Latin licitum < *lik-e-to) with specifications of punishments (including payment in silver = silabur A.3) for violations (side A), and a list of guarantors on side B (though the list seems to start at the end of A.11 with abulu ubokum)--there is as yet no unified, agreed-upon translation. It is still not clear, for example, whether the text presents sacred laws concerning a temple or municipal regulations.

On the first side, David Stifter (2001), for example, indicates that <tirikantam> is an 'assembly of 300', similar to Gaulish tricantia, while <kombalkez> according to Bayer (1994) means something like 'was (deemed) suitable (by the assembly)' (cf. Latin complacere 'to please'). The sequences with nelitom and nekue ... litom with infinitive in -aunei are clearly something like '(it is) not permitted to ...', and mentions some kind of monetary and property fines for ignoring the prohibitions. F. Villar has suggested that kombalkez in the first line is 3rd sing. of the perfect of a root*bh el- ' to speak'--"he has spoken."

In line 2, the form tizaunei is considered to come from *di-dyāmnei (compare Greek δίζημαι "seek out, look for") by Jordán Cólera, though the Greek form is generally thought now to go back to a Proto-Indo-European root *ieh_{2}- ‘to pursue.' But Prósper takes the form tizaunei from *d^{h}i-d^{h}h_{1}-mn-e "to place."

For soz augu arestalo damai in lines A.2-3, Prosper (2006) translates: "[all] this (is) valid by order of the competent authority" based on the following analyses: soz: [all] this (< *sod); augo: final, valid (< *h₂eug-os 'strong, valid', cf. Latin augustus 'solemn'); arestalo: of the competent authority (gen. sing. arestalos < *pr̥Hi-steh₂-lo- 'competent authority' < *pr̥Hi-sto 'what is first, authority'); damai: by order (instrumental fem. sing. < *dʰoh₁m-eh₂ 'establish, dispose'). In lines 3 and 6, stena may be related to the word for "thunder" and the name of the Celtic storm god, Taranos (< *Taran-), forms also seen on Botorrita III below.

In line A 4, the second element in Togoitei eni 'in Togotis' is from *h₁en-i (cf. Lat. in, OIr. in 'into, in'). For Togoitei itself, Matasovic points to Proto-Celtic *tonketo- ‘destiny’ with the cognate in OIr. tocad saying this form is in the dative/locative singular, and connected to the apparent theonymn TOGOTI in the dative singular, but adding that: "The attribution of the Celtiberian forms to this root is as uncertain as anything else in this language."

Later in the same line, bou-sto-mue probably contains in its first element a reflex of the PIE term for "cow": PIE *g^{w}ōw- > Lat. bōs, OHG chuo, Sanksrit gáu-, Tokarian A ko, Armenian kov... through Proto-Celtic *bow- whence OIr. bó, Middle Welsh bu, Middle Bretton bou-tig ‘stable’ and the Gaulish personal name Bo-marus. The meaning, therefore, may be "stable," like the Bretton form, but the form seems to be identical historically to Old Irish búas "riches, wealth (in cattle)" from Proto-Celtic *bow-sto-. The form at the end of line 4, kabizeti, can be derived from *gabiyeti, a third person singular present indicative (or subjunctive?), from the Proto-Indo-European root *g^{h}Hb "take, hold" but here, possibly "give" (whence Latin habeo "hold" and possibly Gothic geben "give"), assuming that *-(i)y- becomes -z- in Celtiberian, as seen also in *nowyo- > CeltIb. nouiza.

In line 6, aeekati is probably a subjunctive form of indeterminate meaning.

And in line 7, zizonti is probably a present third person plural indicative form meaning "they sow."

For saum dekametinas datuz somei eni touzei iste ankios iste es-ankios (A.8-9), Jordán (2004) translates: "of these, he will give the tithe/tax inside of this territory, so [may it] be fenced as [it should] be unfenced" based on the following analyses:

sa-um "of these" (< *sa-ōm)
dekametinas "the tithes, the tax" << *-dekam-etos < *-dkm-etos; compare Gaulish decametos 'tenth', Welsh degfed 'tenth', O.Ir. dechmad 'tenth'
da-tuz "he will pay, will give" (< PIE *deh_{2}-tо̄d 3rd person singular imperative)
en-i "inside, in" (< *h₁en-i)
so-m-ei: of this (loc. sing. < *so-sm-ei 'from this')
touz-ei "territory" (loc. sing. < *touzom 'territory' < *tewt-yo-)
iste ankios "so (be) fenced"
iste es-ankios "as (be) unfenced."

The first word of A.10, nebintor, may be the negative (ne-) of a verb meaning "strike, harm" in the 3rd person imperative middle, from Proto-Celtic *bi-na- ‘strike, hit’—compare Old Irish benaid (same meaning), from PIE *b^{h}eyH- "strike"; whence Old Latin perfines "you should strike" and Old Church Slavonic biti. And for togoitei ios vramtiom-ve auzeti aratim-ve dekametam datuz in A.10, De Bernardo (2009) translates: "In Togotis, he who draws water either for the green or for the farmland, the tithe (of their yield) he shall give." The form io-s in line 10 is the nominative singular masculine of the relative pronoun from Proto-Indo-European *yo- (Sanskrit ya-, Greek hos), which shows up in Irish only as the aspiration for leniting relative verb forms. Line 7 has the accusative singular io-m and the dative singular io-mui of the same root.

The second side clearly consists of names, presumably prominent members of the assembly. The names are in the Celtiberian formula, e.g. lubos kounesikum melnunos, is 'Lubo of the Kounesiko (people), [son] of Melnon'; for this reason, it has been suggested that <bintis> is actually <kentis>, i.e. /gentis/ 'son', as this clearly fits the context (seen notes on plaque III below), but it may merely be a title of a kind of magistrate. Whether this means the sign <Bi> can elsewhere be interpreted as indicating a velar—which would lead, for example, to new possible etymologies for usabitus as from *ups- plus *ag- "drive" and timbitus from *dhingh- "shape, build"—in this text is still unclear. It is generally agreed that kamanom in A.5 means "path," a form also seen in Gaulish, borrowed into Late Latin as cammīnus, and from there into the modern Romance languages.

In B.7, the form useizu (considered equivalent to usizu [K.1.3, II-9, IV-23]) is considered by Jordán Cólera to have come from an earlier nominative *upsē̆-dyō(n), while in line B.5 we find the genitive of the same form: useizunos from *upsē̆-dyōn-os.

== Botorrita II ==
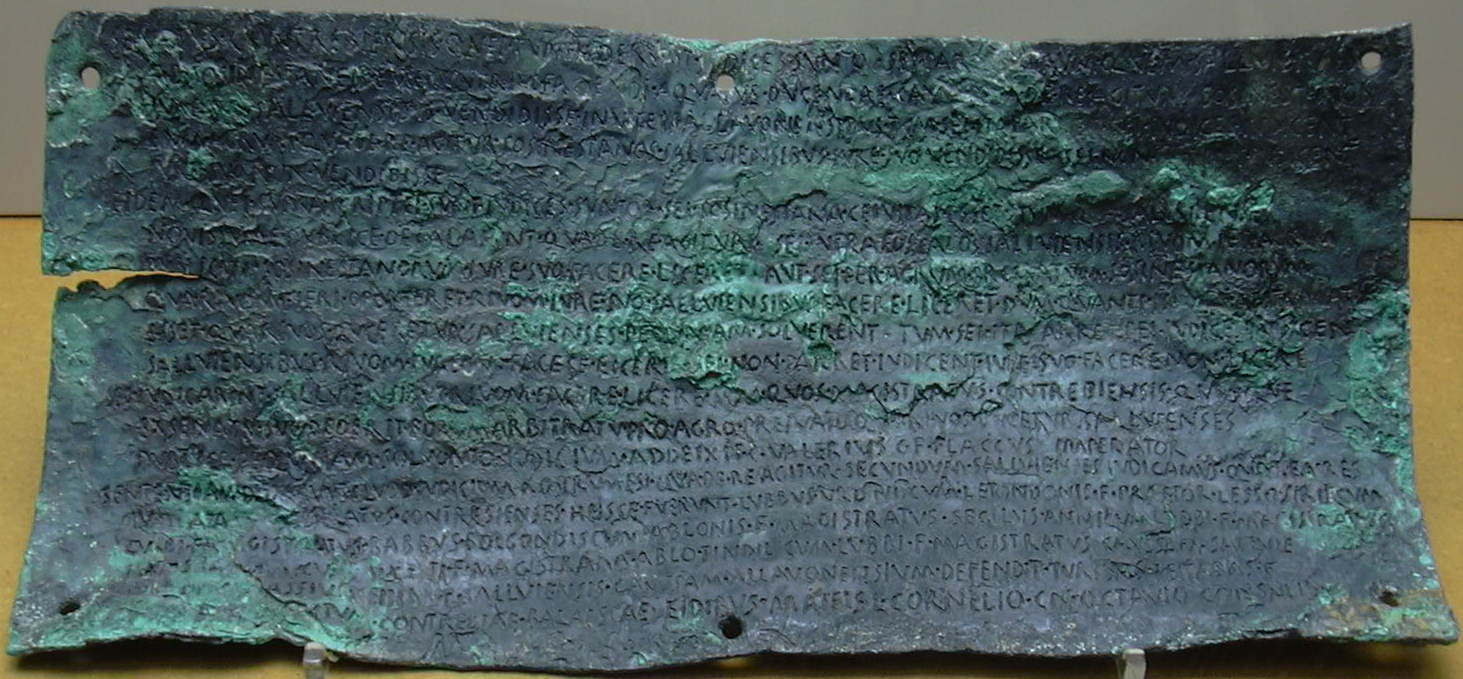
Bronze II in the Zaragoza Museum.

This bronze plaque, also known as Tabula Contrebiensis, is inscribed in Latin and was discovered in an illegal excavation of the Contrebia Belaisca site, and was obtained in December 1979 by editor Guillermo Fatás Cabeza. The inscription is fully decipherable and relates how the senate of Contrebia Belaisca was called upon by neighboring towns for a decision concerning the right of the town of Salluia to build a canal through the territory of the Sosinestani, an initiative to which the neighboring Allauonenses objected. Based upon the names of Roman officials, the text has been dated to May 87 BC. English translation available at: https://droitromain.univ-grenoble-alpes.fr/Anglica/Contrebiensis_Richardson.htm

1. Senatus Contrebie[n]sis quei tum aderunt iudices sunto. Sei par[ret ag]rum quem Salluienses
2. [ab Sosinest]ane[is] emerunt rivi faciendi aquaive ducendae causa qua de re agitur Sosinestanos
3. [iure suo Sa]lluiensibus vendidisse inviteis Allavonensibus;tum sei ita [p]arret eei iudices iudicent
4. eum agrum qua de re agitur Sosinestanos Salluiensibus iure suo vendidisse; sei non parr[e]t iudicent
5. iur[e] suo non vendidi[sse.]

6. Eidem quei supra scriptei [sunt] iudices sunto. Sei Sosinestana ceivitas esset, tum, qua Salluiensis
7. novissume publice depalarunt qua de re agitur, sei [i]ntra eos palos Salluiensis rivom per agrum
8. publicum Sosinestanorum iure suo facere licere[t ] aut sei per agrum preivatum Sosinestanorum
9. qua rivom fieri oporteret rivom iure suo Salluie[n]sibus facere liceret dum quanti is a[ger] aestumatu[s]
10. esset, qua rivos duceretur, Salluienses pequniam solverent, tum, sei ita [p]arret, eei iudices iudicent
11. Salluiensibus rivom iure suo facere licer[e]; sei non parret iudicent iure suo facere non licere.

12. Sei iudicarent Salluiensibus rivom facere licere, tum quos magistratus Contrebiensis quinque
13. ex senatu suo dederit eorum arbitratu pro agro preivato q[u]a rivos ducetur Salluienses
14. publice pequniam solvonto. Iudicium addeixit C.Valerius C.f. Flaccus imperator.

15. Sentent[ia]m deixerunt: quod iudicium nostrum est qua de re agitur secundum Salluienses iudicamus. Quom ea res
16. ud[ic]atas[t mag]is[t]ratus Contrebienses heisce fuerunt: Lubbus Urdinocum Letondonis f. praetor; Lesso Siriscum
17. Lubbi f. [ma]gistratus; Babbus Bolgondiscum Ablonis f. magistratus; Segilus Annicum Lubi f. magistratus;
18. [--]atu[----]ulovicum Uxenti f. magistratus; Ablo Tindilicum Lubbi f. magistratus.Caussam Sallui[ensium]
19. defen[d]it ---]assius [-]eihar f. Salluiensis. Caussam Allavonensium defendit Turibas Teitabas f.
20. [Allavo]n[en]s[is]. Actum [C]ontrebiae Balaiscae eidibus Maieis, L. Cornelio Cn. Octavio consulibu[s].9*

=== Summary ===
Based on Richardson (1983).

The present members of the Contrebian senate are to judge whether the Sosilestani have the right to sell their land to the Salluenses who plan to build a canal on it, against the wishes of the neighboring Allavonenses.

Specifically, the appointed judges are to determine whether by Sosilestani's own laws it is permissible for them to sell the land for building a canal through private land, already staked out for this purpose by the Salluenses, if the latter pay for it appropriately.

If they judge in favor of the sale, then the Contrebian magistracy will pick five men to arbitrate the sale, and Roman commander C. V. Flaccus will support the judgment.

The decision falls in favor of the Salluenses. (There follows a list of the names of the Contrebian magistrates in power at the time.)

== Botorrita III ==
Botorrita III, discovered in 1979, is inscribed in four columns on one side of a plaque, introduced by a heading of two lines. A part of the plaque is missing, but the inscribed portion is complete. It is heavily corroded, and the text was only legible by x-ray.

01: risatioka : lestera[:]ia : tarakuai : nouiz : auzanto
02: eskeninum : taniokakue : soisum : albana

1.1: skirtunos : tirtanikum : l	2.1: sekanos < : > kolukokum : lukinos	3.1: testios : turumokum	4.1: kainu : tirtobolokum
1.2: kontuzos : turos	2.2: tirtanos	3.2: elku : suolakue	4.2: stenion. : turikainos
1.3: retukenos : statulu	2.3: kentiskue : loukaniko < : > uiriaskum	3.3: tirtanikum : uiriaskum : mel	4.3: bolora : kentiskue : melmanzos
1.4: mezukenos : koitina	2.4: mezukenos : turanikum	3.4: kinbiria : kentiskue : turikum	4.4: tiokenesos : uiriaskum
1.5: tueizu : uiroku	2.5: elu : uiriaskum : launiku<e>	3.5: toloku : koitinakue : austunikum	4.5: kalaitos : mturiskum
1.6: munika : koitu : koitina	2.6: likinos : uiskikum	3.6: stenu : bentilikum	4.6: burzu : karunikum
1.7: sekilos : toutinikum : me.	2.7: letontu : auaskum	3.7: burzu : bentilikum : ultatunos	4.7: burzu : abilikum : elazuno
1.8: ultia : uiriaskum : mel	2.8: kasilos : atokum	3.8: koloutios : biniskum	4.8: litu : makeskokum
1.9: sura : matulokum	2.9: usizu : abokum : titos	3.9: antiokos : uiriaskum : melm	4.9: mezukenos : kalisokum
1.10: elkua : raiokum	2.10: burzu : kulukamikum	3.10: elazunos : kaburikum	4.10: koitina : tirikantanko
1.11: buria : batokum	2.11: akuia : sekiloskue : tirilokum	3.11: arkanta : mezukenoskue : abokum	4.11: esueiku : atesikum
1.12: belsa : alasku[m] : mem	2.12: mezukenos : akikum : memun	3.12: arkanta : loukanikum	4.12: kalaitos : kustikum
1.13: elkua : ensikum : seko	2.13: akuia : alaskum : memunos	3.13: stena : ensikum : skirtunos	4.13: antiokos : kustikum
1.14: sekontios : loukanikum : aiu	2.14: terkinos : austikum : eskutino	3.14: burzu : betaskum	4.14: kabutu : abokum
1.15: sura : uiriaskum : mel	2.15: koitina : abokum : useizunos	3.15: koitu : samikum : melmanzo	4.15: anu : uiriaskum
1.16: stena : muturiskum : tirtu.	2.16: tirtouios : turumokum	3.16: sekontios : ubokum	4.16: kalaitos : muturiskum
1.17: sleitiu : karunikum : le	2.17: elaukos : bentikum : rotenanko	3.17: barnai : ensikum : skirtunos	4.17: akuia : albinokum
1.18: retukenos : ensikum	2.18: elkuanos : muturiskum	3.18: tetu : loukanikum	4.18: balakos : sekonzos
1.19: letontu : atokum	2.19: terkinos : telazokum	3.19: stena : uiriaskum	4.19: kara : kalatokum
1.20: bilinos : austikum	2.20: akuia : statu : turaku : tueizunostetoku<m>	3.20: toloku : uiriaskum	4.20: arkanta : mailikum
1.21: belsu : uiriaskum	2.21: mezukenos : elazunos	3.21: arkanta : teiuantikum : tirtunos	4.21: elazunos : albinokum
1.22: sekonzos : uiriaskum : me	2.22: tirtukue : ailokiskum	3.22: mizuku : tirtobolokum	4.22: bubilibor : uiriaskum
1.23: burzu : teiuantikum	2.23: sekilos : mailikum	3.23: retukeno : elkueikikum	4.23: usizu : uiriaskum
1.24: bulibos : turumokum : ultu	2.24: letontu : ustitokum	3.24: kentisum : tuateroskue	4.24: retukenos : telkaskum
1.25: letontu : mailikum	2.25: turenta : kentiskue : ataiokum	3.25: abaliu : berikakue : suaikinokum	4.25: .ria : belsu
1.26: burzu : auikum	2.26: koitina : uerzaizokum : kalmikum	3.26: uiroku : konikum : statulos	4.26: toloku : kurmiliokum
1.27: melmanios : uiriaskum	2.27: elkuanos : kunikum	3.27: aunia : beskokum	4.27: anieskor : talukokum
1.28: karbelos : turumokum : ulta	2.28: launikue : uiriaskum	3.28: bilonikos : elokum : elkinos	4.28: s.[ ... ] < : > alikum
1.29: likinos : uerzaizokum : mem	2.29: koitu : uerzaizokum : aias	3.29: mezukenos : tirtobolokum	4.29: elkueiz : akikum
1.30: koitu : mailikum	2.30: snaziuentos : ataiokum	3.30: akuios : alikum	4.30: raieni : uizuskikum
1.31: akuios : tetokum	2.31: tais : uiriaskum	3.31: tiriu : uiriaskum	4.31: urkala : austunikum
1.32: saluta : uizuskikum	2.32: basaku : uiriaskum	3.32: turtunazkue : kazarokuu	4.32: tama : ataiokum
1.33: burzu : uiskikum : les	2.33: kalaitos	3.33: sleitiu : totinikum	4.33: retukenos : kustikum
1.34: ana : uerzaizokum : atu	2.34: koitinakue : uiriraskum	3.34: munika : ensikum : skirtunos	4.34: bilosban : betikum
1.35: sanion : baatokum	2.35: likinos : ataiokum	3.35: sekontios : uiriaskum	4.35: koitina : kankaikiskum
1.36: niskekue : babokum	2.36: sa[ ... ]i < : > kaburikum : memun	3.36: sura : suaikinokum	4.36: likinos : kuezontikum
1.37: biurtilaur : alaskum	2.37: kares : .ruaku : korkos	3.37: koitina : suoli.kum	4.37: munika : uerzaizokum
1.38: bini	2.38: to[..]r.tetokum : kekas : ko	3.38: bilir. < : > turtuntakue : telkaskum	4.38: terkinos : turanikum
1.39: rusku : uiriaskum : kentisku<e>	2.39: aureiaku	3.39: elu < : > karbilikum	4.39: teuzesi : kustikum
1.40: or..bilos : likinoskue	2.40: tuate.eskue : uiriaskum	3.40: terkinos : atokum : launikue	4.40: kaukirino
1.41: abo..kum	2.41: burzu : babouikum	3.41: mizuku : telkaskum
1.42: abu..akuiakue : araiokum	2.42: koitu : kuinikum : tirtunos	3.42: melmantama : bentilikum
1.43: alu : aiukue : araiokum	2.43: [ ... .] : loukanikum : tirtunos	3.43: markos : kalisokum
1.44: kalos : telkaskum	2.44: toloku : kalisokum : atinos	3.44: arkanta : toutinikum
1.45: elazuna : loukanikum	2.45: tarkunbiur	3.45: tolokunos : ke : kalisokum
1.46: mezukenos : loukanikum	2.46: bibalos : atokum : tirtano	3.46: sura : ensikum : melman < : > ba (?)
1.47: burzu : tirtobolokum	2.47: sikeia : beteriskum	3.47: usama : abaloskue : karunikum
1.48: sleitiu : makeskokum	2.48: sekontios : turumokum : ultatun	3.48: elazuna : balaisokum
1.49: iunsti.[.] : uiriaskum	2.49: tekos : konikum	3.49: likinos : turumokum : ti
1.50: tioken.s : uiriaskum	2.50: bartiltun : ekarbilos	3.50: tueizunos : binis.kum
1.51: uiroku : turumokum	2.51: munika < : > elkuakue : koitinas	3.51: bilonikos : ensikum
1.52: mizuku : retukenos : tirtanos	2.52: terkinos : toutinikum : leton	3.52: ebursunos : mailikinokum
1.53: munikakue : uiriaskum	2.53: katunos : burikounikum	3.53: arkanta : ailokiskum
1.54: burzu : atokum	2.54: elazuna : ukulikum	3.54: suros : alikum
1.55: aualos : kortikos	2.55: keka : kabelaikiskum	3.55: ultinos : amakue : uiriaskum
1.56: amu : kankaikiskum	2.56: munika : tolisokum : tirtun	3.56: babos : kentiskue : uiriaskum
1.57: kaiaitos : litukue : abokum	2.57: elazuna : ensikum : turo	3.57: turaios : litanokum : kurmilokum
1.58: aba : muturiskum	2.58: sekonzos : bentikum	3.58: launikue : uiriaskum
1.59: barnai : turumokum : tirs	2.59: tokiosar : ensikum	3.59: kari : uiriaskum
1.60: mezukenos : abokum : turo	2.60: akuia : abokum : letontunos	3.60: kuintitaku : mailikinokum

=== Notes ===
Basically this is a list of names, mostly following the formula seen on the first plaque: name plus tribal name in -um (probably genitive pl). In the mostly obscure first two lines (=title?), the form soisum seems to be a close parallel to the Sanskrit genitive plural pronominal form teśam < *toisom "of them". If Lambert is correct in his determination that eskeninum is a genitive plural agreeing with the pronoun, and from *eks- plus the cognate of Latin genuinus, and that alba is a borrowing from Latin in the meaning "public list of names" (originally written on a white board), a partial translation of the second line might be: "...[this is] the public list of the names of those very authentic [authorities/individuals]..." In the first line, nouiz may be from *nowija- "new." Whether the list involved legal claims (like Botorrita II above) or had a religious or some other purpose remains, however, unclear. It is notable and rare for this region in this time period for such a public list to include so many female names and references—apparently nearly 30.

In lines 1.14, 1.45, 1.46, and 3.18 (always in second position), the form loukanikum may contain the Proto-Indo-European *leukós "bright, shining" seen also in the Celtic tribal name Leuci. The same root can be seen elsewhere in Celtiberian inscriptions in loukaiteitubos [K.0.]7, and loukio [K.18.2, -1].

In lines 1.16, 3.13, 3.19, stena (also seen above in A.3) along with stenion in 4.2, may be related to the word for "thunder" and the name of the Celtic storm god, Taranis (< *Taran- < Proto-Indo-European *(s)tenh^{2-}), with the "s mobile" preserved here uniquely in Celtic.

On the name mezu-kenos in lines 1.46, 1.60, 2.4, 2.12, 2.21, 3.11, 3.29, and 4.9 (always in first position, syntactically so in 3.11), Ranko Matasovic notes: "The root [PCelt. *genan < *genh_{1}-en > Old Irish gein a neuter -n stem meaning ‘birth, conception’] is attested in Celtiberian as the second element of the compound PN Mezu-kenos (= OIr. Midgen)." The first element seems to be from Proto-Celtic *medu- < PIE *med^{h}u- "mead", making the compound equivalent to the Gaulish personal name Medu-genos, Ogam MEDDOGENI, Old Irish Midgen, and Old Welsh Medgen which allows the reconstruction of the Proto-Celtic personal name *Medu-genos. But Jordan Carlos suggests instead that the first element simply means 'middle' pointing to a straightforward compound *med^{h}yo-genos meaning 'middle born.'

Matasovic says of kalmikom (2.26) that it may be related to Middle Irish calma "strong, brave; strength fortitude" and Old Welsh celmed "skilled" all going back to Proto-Celtic *kalmiyo-, a root with no clear Indo-European connections, so perhaps borrowed from a non-Indo-European source. In line 1.30 (and many other similar forms throughout), koitu may be a form of Latin Quintus and koitina may be its feminine equivalent. Note that the Greek transcription of the Latin name was Κοιντος. Possibly also connected is coeti-c from the Larzac tablet (1.b). The form *tekos in 2.49 matches the Proto-Celtic root *teg-os "house."

In lines 3.12 and 3.21, the form arkanta may derive from the PIE word for 'silver' cf Latin argentum.

In 3.25 and 3.58, launi may mean "spouse", both times followed by -kue, so "and [his] wife"; it also occurs in local fragmentary epigraphy. Similarly, kentis (2.3, 2.25, 3.4, 3.56, 4.3) "son" is also followed by -kue "and [his] son," and tuate.es-kue (2.40) likely means "and [his] daughter(s?)". The two-line multiple genitives in 3.23-3.24 are unique in the text: retukeno : elkueikikum / kentisum : tuateros-kue "of the sons and of the daughter of the Re(x)-tu-genoi ('right born, lawful' < *h₃reg-tō-genos, Gaulish Rextugenos), the Elkueikikoi ("those with horses that have wheels/chariots" if from *ekue-kykloi; speaking against this interpretation are the many other forms that begin elk- in the list)." The conjunction -kue also seems to appear in line 1.34-35: sanion : baatokum/ niskekue : babokum "Sanion of the Baatoks [unless this is a misreading or misspelling for "babokum" as in the next line], and Niske [oddly, the only form in the list starting with "n-"] of the Baboks."

These suggest that akuia (1.42), munika (1.53, also 2.51), litu (1.57), elkua (2.51), ama (3.55; also amu 1.56?), koitana (3.5, also 1.4, 1.6, 2.15), turtunta (3.38), and abalos ("uncle"?)(3.47) may also express some relationship, since they fall in the same positions followed by -kue (though some or all may simply be names as well).

The names kalaitos in 2.33, 4.5, 4.12 and tur(r)o (1.60, 2.67 and as elements in many other names, probably "bull"—note also perhaps the name of the Celtic tribe Taurisci) are also found frequently carved in cave walls in the area. The former also resembles the form kaltaikikos from Luzaga's Bronze. On the same bronze, the form elazunom appears, probably a variant form (different case and/or gender?) elazuna on line 2.57 above.

The form burzu (1.23, 1.33...) may be connected to the ancient name for a town about 30 miles north of Botorrita: Bursau.

The element mel- in 1.18, 3.3, 4.3...may be from the proto-Celtic root *mello "hill", perhaps as part of a place name; or the short forms may be clippings of the longer forms at 3.42 mel-man-tama and at 4.3 mel-man-zos which seem to be personal names meaning 'gifted with mind' < *men-mn̥-tyo- (with dissimilation of the first -n- to -l-). Compare the Gaulish (dative plural) theonym Menman-dutis.

The element ebur- in ebur-sunos (3.52) probably means "yew tree"; compare Old Irish ibar "yew-tree," Welsh efwr "alder buckthorn", Breton evor "alder buckthorn."

Xavier Delamarre and John T. Koch argue that the term uiroku (< *wiro-kū) in 1.5, 1.51 and 3.26 means 'man-dog' (i.e. werewolf). It would be cognate to Viroconium (< *wiroconion, 'place of man-dogs'), the ancient name of the English village of Wroxeter, the Old Irish ferchu ('male dog, fierce dog'), and the Brittonic personal names Guurci (Old Welsh) and Gurki (Old Breton).It has been observed that nearly every line in this text has a form ending in -kum, and this is generally taken to be a genitive plural ending -um on a (maybe generalized) -k- stem, a common feature of Celtic place names (such as Brittonic Ebor-ak-on > York); this observation doesn't take account of the type and position of the names that appear with the k-um stem, all of them located in the second place of each formula, nor it is able to explain the lack of final -m in the term uiroku throughout all of the text.

Blanca María Prósper interprets the word letontu as pertaining to the semantic field of Proto-Indo-European *pléth₂us ('flat, vast, broad'). It is also suggested that Toutinokum refers to a family name and derives from the widespread Celtic (and Indo-European) stem *teut/tout- ('people, tribe').

Jürgen Untermann notes that some of the names may be of Latin origin: markos (3.43), titos (2.9), lukinos, balakos sekonzos (4.18) = Flaccus Secundus, sekontios (3.16), bolora = Flora, bubilibor = Publipor; while others may be of Greek origin: antiokos (4.13) = Antiochus, bilonikos (3.28, 3.51) Philonicus, tais (2.31) Thais. Note that in 3.16, the name Secundus seems to be spelled sekontios, suggesting that the palatalization of medial /d/ to <z> was still in progress.

In 1.15, anu may be compared to Gaulish Anauus "prosperous, wealthy" < Proto-Celtic *anawo- ‘wealth, profit’ (compare OIr. anae and Middle Welsh anaw both ‘wealth’ < Proto-Indo-European *h3enh2- ‘enjoy, use’; cognates Gr. onínēmi ‘use’, Go. ansts ‘mercy, benevolence’). In 1.59 and 3.17, branai may be compared to Gaulish barnaunom "judge(-ment)" (?) from Proto-Celtic *bar-na-, whence also Middle Welsh barnu ‘judge, proclaim.’ The forms not derived from Greek or Latin that have the element bil in 1.20, 1.40, 3.38, and 4.34 may be derived from Proto-Celtic *bel-yo- "tree" (whence Old Irish bile "tree"), seen in the Gaulish place name Billio-magus (>French Billom), perhaps also seen in reduplicated form in the name of the local town Bilbilis "having many trees."

Names with claimed Iberian elements include biurtilaur (1.37), anieskor (4.27), bilosban (4.34), and bartiltun : ekarbilos (2.50), karbilikum (3.39). In 1.55, kortikos may mean "public," and kontusos (1.2) may either refer to a group of clients under patronage of someone, or a group of slaves.

== Botorrita IV ==
Botorrita IV, discovered in 1994, consists of 18 lines on both faces of the plaque. The text is fragmentary.

A.1. [...]tam:tirikantam:entorkue:toutam[...]
A.2. [...]:sua kombal[.]z:bouitos:ozeum:[...]
A.3. [...]i:turuntas:tirikantos:kustai:bize[...]
A.4. [...]a:karalom:aranti:otenei:ambi[...]
A.5. [...]kom:atibion:taskue:.a.s[...]
A.6. [...]kue:usimounei:[...]
A.7. [...]karalom:ios:lu.e.s[...]
A.8. [...]oi.u..ti:esta[...]
A.9. [...]uta:...kue[...]
A.10. [...]ti.. n.e[...]
B.1. [...]e .. i[...]
B.2. [...]atuz:uta:e[...]
B.3. [...]isum:..ti:[...]
B.4. [...]olo...:iom:u[...]
B.5. [...]toke...ta:.ue:tizatuz[...]
B.6. [...]l..lez.l.toioan[...]
B.7. [...]toruonti:stoteroi:tas[...]
B.8. [...]ko..esusiomo..o[...]

=== Notes ===
The form tirikantam ("territory"? or "(group of) 300"?) at the beginning of Botorrita I reappears in line A.1 here, and as tirikantos in A.3; and note sua kombal[.]z in A.2 versus sua kombalkez in B.I, A.1. The form bouitos in line 2 is likely from *g^{w}ou-i-tos-s "cow path."

In A3, turuntas is probably an -a- stem genitive singular, possibly a place name, or perhaps a form meaning "spring."

The form karalom occurs in both A.4 and A.7, and it may refer to the demonym Gralliensis mentioned by Pliny the Elder. Also in line A.4, the form aranti may refer to a town that issues coinage bearing the legends aratiz and aratikos, a town name also seen in Arandis in Lusitania

In B.4, tizatuz may be from PIE *di-d^{h}h_{1}-tōd, which would make Gr. τῐ́θέτω "he must put" its exact cognate. In B.7, the form stoteroi may be from *stā-tér-oi, from the root *stā- "to be standing, to remain, to be," but here a nominal form in the nominative plural "those standing..."
