= Fosca =

Fosca may also refer to:

== Literature and film ==
- Fosca (novel), an 1869 novel by Iginio Ugo Tarchetti
  - Passion of Love, a 1981 Italian drama film directed by Ettore Scola adapted from Tarchetti's novel
- Raimon Fosca, a man cursed to live forever All Men Are Mortal, a 1946 novel by Simone de Beauvoir

== Music ==
- Fosca (band), a British band active 1997–2009
- Fosca (opera), an 1873 opera by Antônio Carlos Gomes based on Luigi Capranica's 1869 novel La festa delle Marie.
- Fosca, character in Passion, based on the Tarchetti's novel

== Geography ==
- Fosca, Cundinamarca, a town in Colombia
- Castell de la Fosca, an ancient Iberian settlement
- La Fosca, a small village in the Mediterranean Costa Brava

== See also ==
- Santa Fosca (disambiguation)
- Uva Fosca
