= Iberian language =

Extinct language of an indigenous western European people

Iberian
- Native to: Modern Spain and France
- Region: Mediterranean coast of the Iberian Peninsula
- Extinct: 1st century AD
- Language family: Unclassified
- Writing system: Iberian scripts

Language codes
- ISO 639-3: xib
- Glottolog: iber1250

The Iberian language was the language or family of languages of an indigenous western European people (the Iberians), identified by ancient Greek and Roman sources, who lived in the eastern and southeastern regions of the Iberian Peninsula in the pre-Migration Era (before about AD 375). An ancient Iberian culture can be identified as existing between the 7th and 1st centuries BC, at least.

Iberian, like all the other Paleohispanic languages except Basque, was extinct by the 1st to 2nd centuries AD. It had been replaced gradually by Latin, following the Roman conquest of the Iberian Peninsula.

The Iberian language is unclassified: while the scripts used to write it have been deciphered to various extents, the language itself remains largely unknown. Links with other languages have been suggested, especially the Basque language, based largely on the observed similarities between the numerical systems of the two. In contrast, the Punic language of Carthaginian settlers was Semitic, while Indo-European languages of the peninsula during the Iron Age include the now extinct Hispano-Celtic and Lusitanian languages, Ionic Greek, and Latin, which formed the basis for modern Iberian Romance languages, but none of these were related to the Iberian language.

== Geographic distribution ==
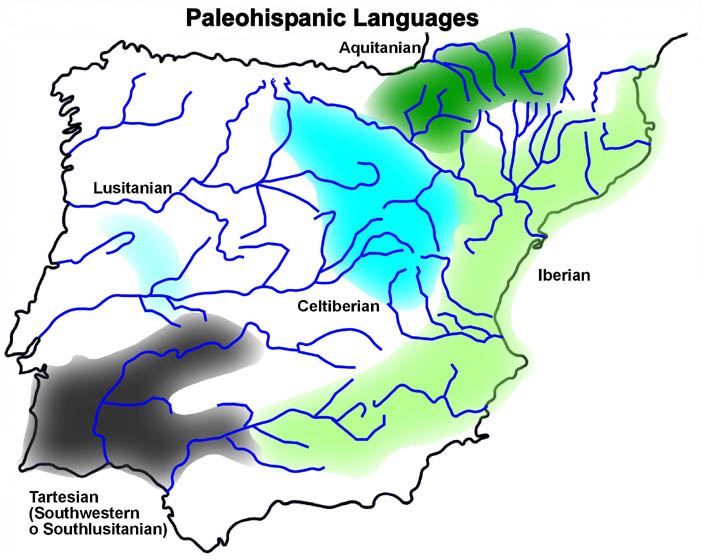
Iberian language in the context of Paleohispanic languages

Iberian inscriptions are found along the Mediterranean coast of the Iberian Peninsula, reaching up to the river Hérault in the south of France. Important written remains have been found in Ensérune, between Narbonne and Béziers in France, in an oppidum with mixed Iberian and Celtic elements. The southern limit would be Porcuna, in Jaén (Spain), where splendid sculptures of Iberian riders have been found. Further inland, the exact distribution of the Iberian language inscriptions is uncertain. It seems that the culture reached the interior through the Ebro river (Iberus in Latin) as far as Salduie, but no further.

Among the pre-Roman peoples of the Iberian Peninsula, the following might have spoken the Iberian language: Ausetani (northeastern Catalonia), Ilergetes (Lleida and Huesca up to the Pyrenees), Indigetes (coast of Girona), Laietani (Barcelona), Cessetani (Tarragona), Ilercavones (Murcia and Levante up to Tarragona), Edetani (Valencia, Castellón and Teruel), Contestani (Valencia, Alicante, Cartagena and Albacete), Bastetani (Granada, Almería and Murcia) and Oretani (Jaén, Ciudad Real, Albacete and Cuenca). Turduli and Turdetani are believed to be of the Tartessian language group.

For some scholars, such as Velaza (2006), Iberian could have been the language spoken by the autochthonous population of these territories, while for others, such as De Hoz (1993), Iberian could have been more of a lingua franca.

== History ==
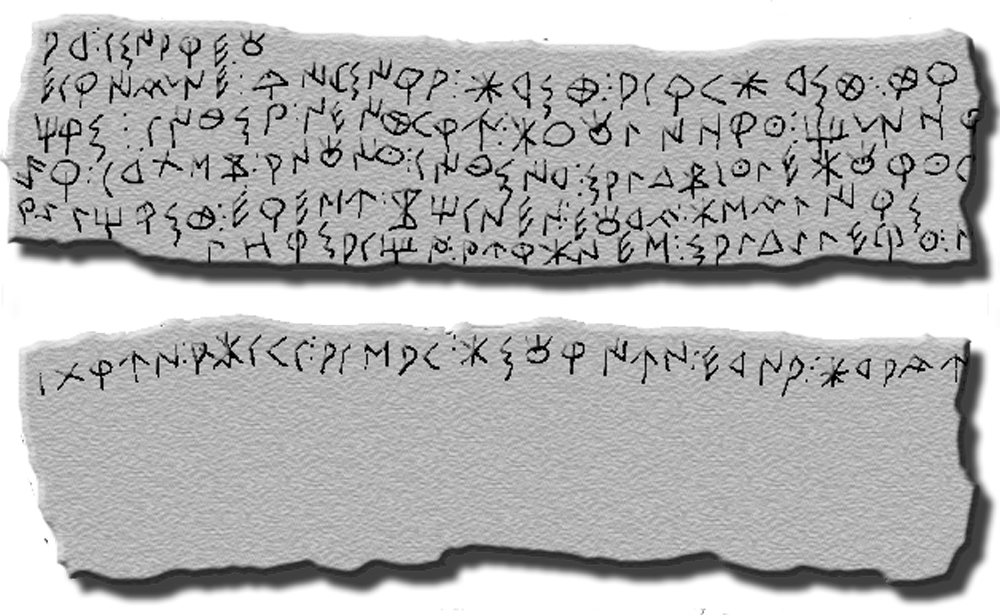
Lead plaque from Ullastret using the dual variant of the northeastern Iberian script

The origin of the language is unknown. Although Iberian ceased to be written in the 1st century AD, it may have survived in some areas until the Visigothic period (ca. 500s to 700s), according to Ramón Menéndez Pidal.

There are several theories about the geographical origin of Iberian. According to the Catalan theory, the Iberian language originated in northern Catalonia, where the earliest Iberian inscriptions are documented (600 BC in Ullastret). Its expansion towards the north and south would have been due to broad population movements in times shortly before the first written documents, from the 11th to the 10th century BC, given that the Iberian language appears homogeneous in Iberian texts and, if it were of greater antiquity, the development of dialects should be evident. The presence of non-interpretable elements, such as Iberian anthroponyms amongst inscriptions in this area has not been considered statistically significant.

== Writing ==
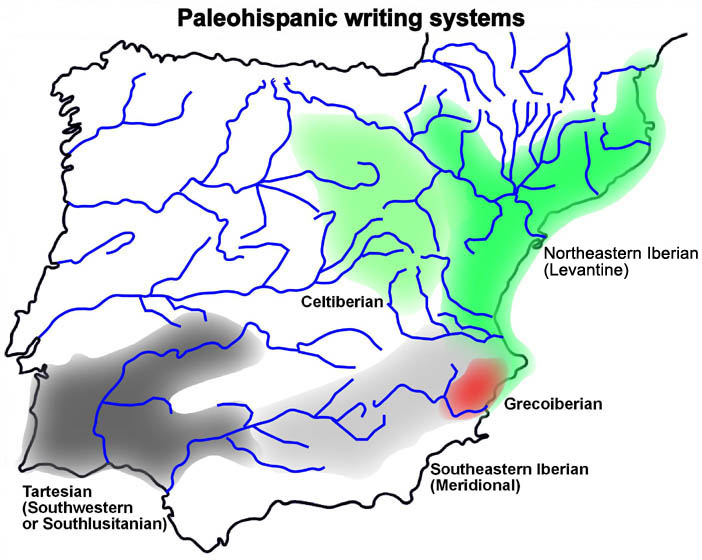
Iberian scripts in the context of paleohispanic scripts

The oldest Iberian inscriptions date to the 6th century BC or maybe the 5th century BC and the latest ones date from the end of the 1st century BC or maybe the beginning of the 1st century AD. More than two thousand Iberian inscriptions are currently known. Most are short texts on ceramic with personal names, which are usually interpreted as ownership marks. Many coins minted by Iberian communities during the Roman Republic have legends in Iberian. The longest Iberian texts were made on lead plaques; the most extensive is from Yátova (Valencia) with more than six hundred signs.

Three different scripts have remained for the Iberian language:

- Northeastern Iberian script
  - Dual variant (4th century BC and 3rd century BC)
  - Non-dual variant (2nd century BC and 1st century BC)
- Southeastern Iberian script
- Greco-Iberian alphabet (most of the aforementioned Leads of La Serreta are written in this version).

=== Northeastern (or Levantine) Iberian script ===
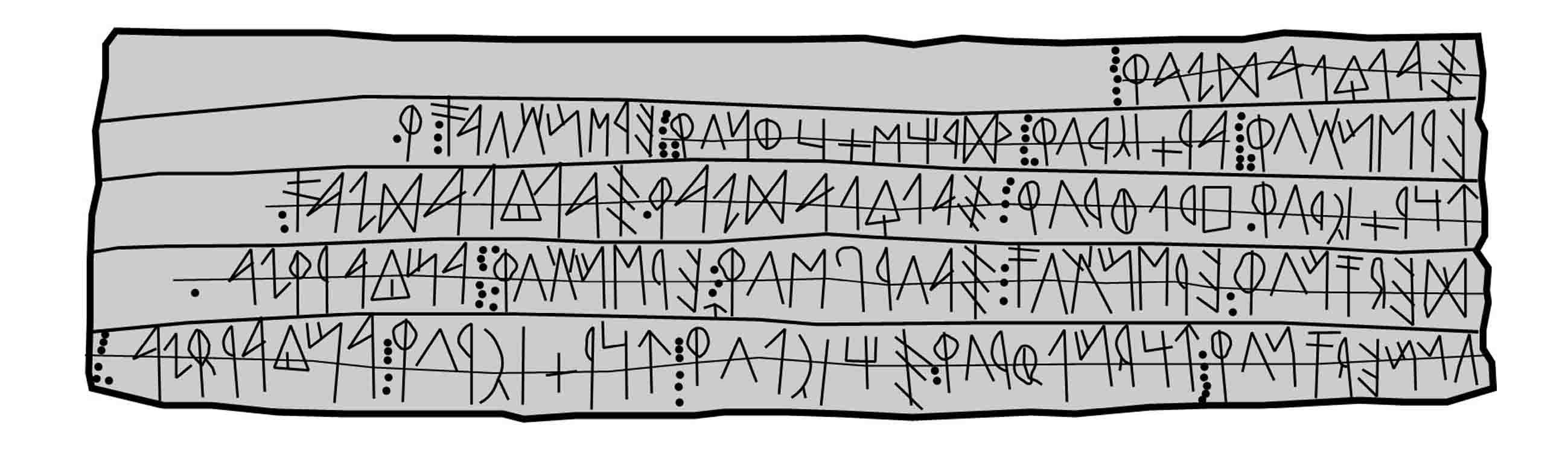
Lead plaque from La Bastida de les Alcuses (Mogente) using the southeastern Iberian script

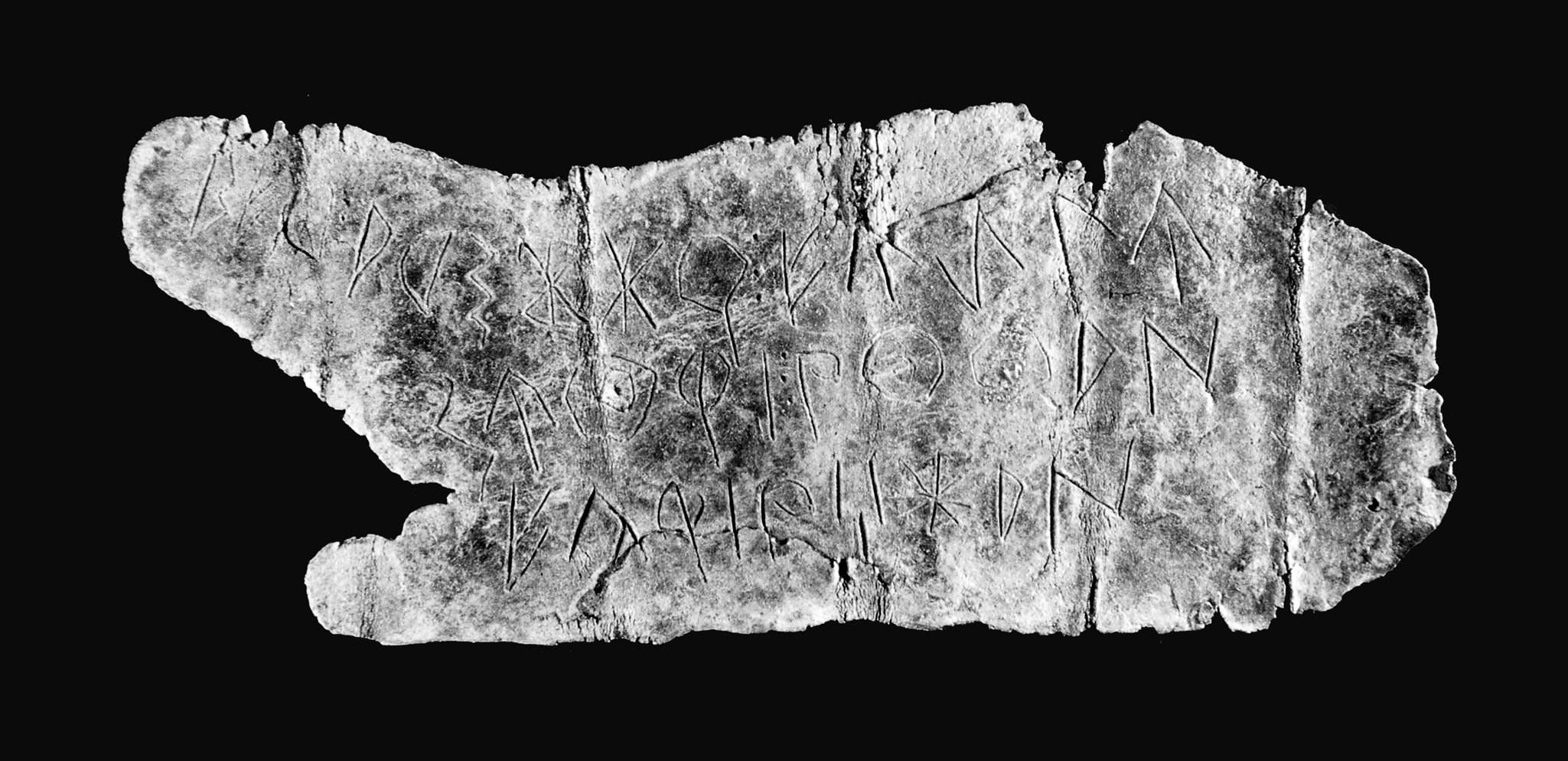
Lead plaque from Castellet de Bernabè, Valencia

The northeastern Iberian script is also known as the Iberian script, because it is the Iberian script most frequently used (95% of the extant texts (Untermann 1990)). The northeastern Iberian inscriptions have been found mainly in the northeastern quadrant of the Iberian Peninsula: chiefly on the coast from Languedoc-Roussillon to Alicante, but with a deep penetration into the Ebro valley. This script is almost completely deciphered.

All the paleohispanic scripts, with the exception of the Greco-Iberian alphabet, share a common distinctive typological characteristic: they use signs with syllabic value for the occlusives and signs with monophonematic value for the remaining consonants and for vowels. From a writing systems point of view, they are neither alphabets nor syllabaries; rather, they are "mixed" scripts that are normally identified as semi-syllabaries. Regarding their origin, there is no agreement among researchers; for some linguists, they are linked only to the Phoenician alphabet, while others see the Greek alphabet as playing a part.

=== Southeastern (or Meridional) Iberian script ===
The southeastern Iberian script is a semi-syllabary too, but it is more similar to the Tartessian script than to the northeastern Iberian script. The southeastern Iberian inscriptions have been found mainly in the southeastern quadrant of the Iberian Peninsula: eastern Andalusia, Murcia, Albacete, Alicante and Valencia. This script is not completely deciphered.

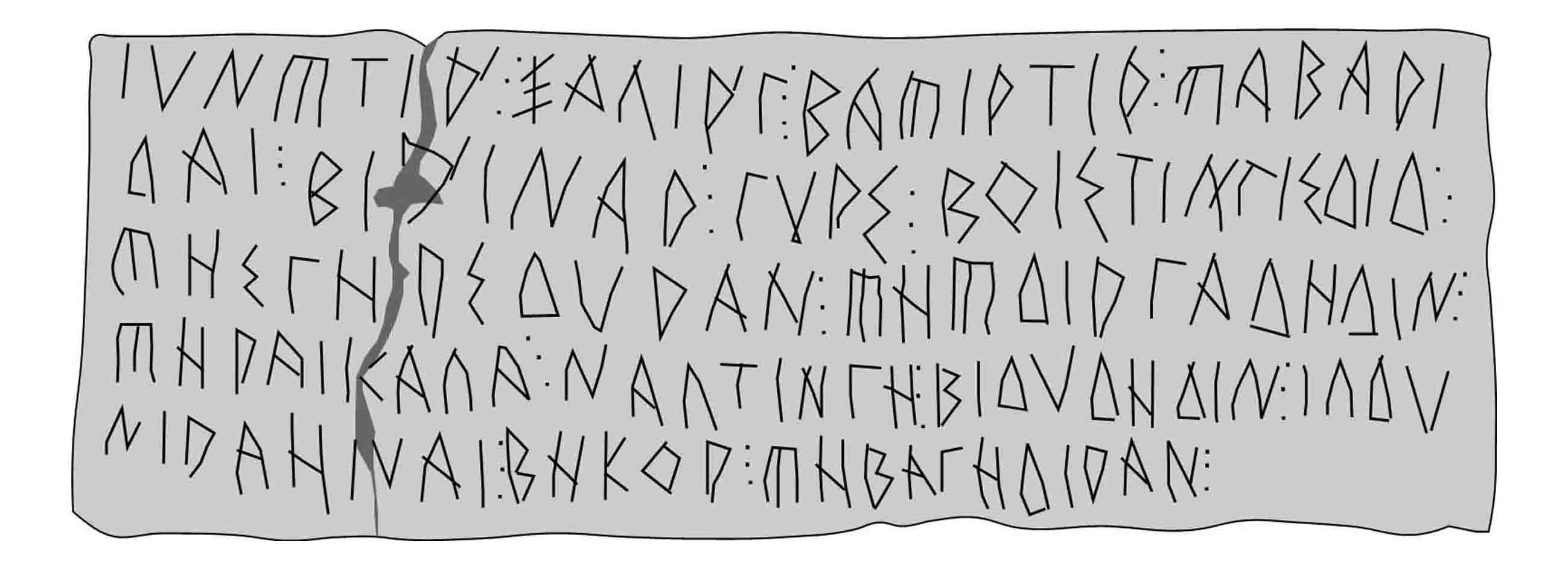
Lead plaque from la Serreta (Alcoy) using the Greco-Iberian alphabet

=== Greco-Iberian alphabet ===
The Greco-Iberian alphabet is a direct adaptation of an Ionic variant of a Greek alphabet to the specificities of the Iberian language. The inscriptions that use the Greco-Iberian alphabet have been found mainly in Alicante and Murcia.

== Phonology ==
Very little is known for certain about Iberian. The investigation of the language is past its initial phase of transcription and compiling material, and is currently in the phase of identifying grammatical elements in the texts. The hypotheses currently proposed are unconfirmed, and are likely to remain so unless the discovery of a bilingual text allows linguists to confirm their deductions.

=== Vowels ===
Iberian appears to have five vowels commonly transcribed as a e i o u. Some other languages on the peninsula such as Basque and modern Spanish also have such systems. Although five-vowel systems are extremely common all over the world, it has been suggested that this may point to a Sprachbund amongst the ancient languages of the Iberian peninsula.

The unrounded vowels (in frequency order: a, i, e) appear more frequently than the rounded vowels (u, o). Although there are indications of a nasal vowel (ḿ), this is thought to be an allophone. Judging by Greek transcriptions, it seems that there were no vowel length distinctions; if this is correct then Iberian uses the long ē (Greek: ἦτα, romanized: êta) as opposed to the short epsilon Greek: ἒ ψιλόν, romanized: è psilón.

Vowels
	Front	Back
Close	i ⟨⟩	u ⟨⟩
Mid	e ⟨⟩	o ⟨⟩
Open	a ⟨⟩	

==== Diphthongs ====
It seems that the second element of diphthongs was always a closed vowel, as in ai (śaitabi), ei (neitin), and au (lauŕ). Untermann observed that the diphthong ui could only be found in the first cluster.

==== Semivowels ====
It is possible that Iberian had the semivowels /j/ (in words such as aiun or iunstir) and /w/ (only in loanwords such as diuiś from Gaulish). The fact that /w/ is lacking in native words casts doubt on whether semivowels really existed in Iberian outside of foreign borrowings and diphthongs.

=== Consonants ===
Consonants
		Labial	Coronal	Dorsal
Nasal		m ⟨⟩	n ⟨⟩	
Plosive		b ⟨,,,, ⟩	d ~ t ⟨,,,, ⟩	ɡ ~ k ⟨,,,, ⟩
Affricate			t͡s ~ t͡ʃ ~ s ⟨ (s) (Note: ⟨s⟩ and ⟨r⟩ are sometimes alternatively transliterated as ⟨z⟩ and ⟨rr⟩ respectively, in which case ⟨ś⟩ and ⟨ŕ⟩ are transliterated as ⟨s⟩ and ⟨r⟩ instead.)⟩	
Fricative			t͡s ~ t͡ʃ ~ s ⟨ (s)⟩	
Fricative			s ~ ɕ ⟨ (ś)⟩	
Lateral			l ⟨⟩	
Rhotic	Flap		ɾ ⟨ (ŕ)⟩	
Rhotic	Trill		r ⟨ (r)⟩	

- Rhotics: There are two rhotics r and ŕ. Iberian specialists do not agree about the phonetic values assigned to either rhotic. Correa (1994) hypothesized that ŕ was an alveolar flap /ɾ/ and r was a "compound vibrant", that is, a trill /r/. Later, Rodríguez Ramos (2004) suggested that ŕ was an alveolar flap /ɾ/ and r is a retroflex flap /ɽ/ in line with Ballester (2001) who thought that r represents a uvular fricative /ʁ/. However, Ballester (2005) later changed his hypothesis and took r for an alveolar flap /ɾ/ and ŕ for the alveolar trill /r/. Neither r nor ŕ occurs word-initially, which is also the case in Basque.
- Sibilants: There are two sibilants s and ś. The distinction is unclear, and there are multiple proposals. Ballester (2001) theorizes that s was an alveolar /s/ and ś was an alveolo-palatal /ɕ/. Rodríguez Ramos (2004) proposes that ś was alveolar /s/ and s was an affricate, either dental/alveolar /t͡s/ or palatal /t͡ʃ/ (like English ⟨ch⟩). This proposal coincides with the observation by Correa on adaptations of Gallic names in Iberian texts. Basque also has two alveolar sibilants: the lamino-alveolar ⟨z⟩ /s̻/ and the apico-alveolar ⟨s⟩ /s̺/, which could correspond to s and ś. Basque also has the postalveolar ⟨x⟩ /ʃ/.
- Laterals: The lateral l is normally interpreted as /l/. It is extremely rare in final position and it could be that the distribution is on occasion complementary with ŕ: aŕikal-er ~ aŕikaŕ-bi.
- Nasals:
  - The n was probably alveolar /n/.
  - m: Researchers studying Iberian do not agree on the kind of nasal represented by this letter. The letter m rarely occurs word-initially. Velaza (1996) hypothesizes it could be an allophone of medial n, as shown in the example of iumstir/iunstir. José A. Correa (1999) suggests it may be a geminate or strong nasal. Ballester (2001) considers it to be a labialized nasal in Iberian and in Celtiberian. Rodríguez Ramos (2004) mentions that it could be an allophone of n where it nasalizes the preceding vowel.
  - There is some controversy over the sign transcribed as ḿ. While it is thought to be some type of nasal, there is no certainty as to its phonetic value. Several linguists agree on the value [na], based on similarities with texts written in the Greek alphabet, as there are similarities between the suffixes -ḿi / -nai, and in the onomastic elements -ḿbar- / -nabar-. Another part of this theory seems to contradict itself with the transcription of ḿbar-beleś into Latin as VMARBELES. Correa (1999) proposes that it was a labialized nasal /mʷ/. It is not even clear that the sign is always pronounced in the same form. Rodríguez Ramos (2004) considers it a nasalized vowel, produced by progressive nasalization (thus /na/ > /nã/, written either na, nḿ or ḿ).
- Plosives: There are five plosives: /b, d, t, ɡ, k/.
  - While some scripts appear to distinguish between /d/ and /t/, as well as /ɡ/ and /k/, others do not. This could be due to several factors; it is possible there was a degree of allophony between voiced and unvoiced plosives; or perhaps there were not, and the lack of orthographic distinction was an idiosyncrasy, possibly resulting from the Iberians having adapted their writing system from a language that did not have voicing distinctions (such as Etruscan, or the as-of-yet undeciphered Tartessian language).
  - The evidence indicates the non-existence of a phoneme p as it is not documented either in the Greek alphabet or in the dual Iberian systems. It is only found in Latin inscriptions naming native Iberians and is thought to be an allophone of b.
  - It has been suggested that the phoneme b would on occasions have been pronounced similar to w (this would be explained by the frequency of the sign bu), and as such it could have had a nasalized pronunciation.

== Morphology ==
There are a number of known affixes, especially applied to last names. For the Iberian language these seem to be postpositional, and apparently more agglutinative than fusional.

The best-known are the following:

-ar: applied to proper names to mark possession.
-en: of a similar or identical use to -ar.
-ka: seems to indicate the person who receives something.
-te: seems to indicate the ergative.
-ku: seems to indicate the ablative. Possibly related to the Basque local genitive -ko.
-ken / -sken: usually understood as genitive plural because of its use on coins in ethnical names (with parallels on Latin and Greek coins).
-k: has been proposed on occasions to mark the plural. -k is a plural marker in Basque.

== Lexicon ==
There are some words for which there has been surmised a more or less probable meaning:

- aŕe take as akin to the Latin formula hic est situs ("here he is") (Untermann 1990, 194) because of a bilingual inscription from Tarragona C.18.6
- eban and ebanen as equivalent to the Latin coeravit ("he cared [to be done]") in tombstones (Untermann 1990, 194), because of a bilingual inscription from Sagunto F.11.8
- iltiŕ and iltun as typical Iberian toponyms for city names, meaning something like "city" / "town"
- ekiar: verb or verbal noun with a meaning like "to do" / "to make" compared with the Basque verb egin (Beltrán 1942; Correa 1994, 284). Likine-te ekiar Usekerte-ku with a meaning akin to "made by Likinos of Osicerda" (Correa 1994, 282)
- seltar and siltar as meaning something like "tomb" on tombstones (Untermann 1990, 194).
- śalir as meaning something like "money" / "coin", because of its use in coins (as iltiŕta-śalir-ban) and its use in lead plaque inscriptions adjacent to numbers and quantities (Untermann 1990, 191).

=== Personal names ===
Thanks to the Latin Inscription of the plaque of Ascoli, which includes a list of Iberian cavalry soldiers in the Roman army (the Turma Salluitana attested in the Bronze of Ascoli), the forms of Iberian proper names have been unraveled. Iberian names are formed mainly by two interchangeable elements, each usually formed of two syllables, which are written together (Untermann 1998). For example, the element "iltiŕ" can be found in the following names: iltiŕaŕker, iltiŕbaś, iltiŕtikeŕ, tursiltiŕ, baiseiltiŕ or bekoniltiŕ. This discovery was a giant step: from this moment it was possible to identify with some kind of confidence the names of persons in the texts. Nevertheless, the list of components of Iberian names varies between researchers. The basic list comes from Untermann (1990) and was recently updated by Rodríguez Ramos (2002b); complementary data and criteria can be found in the Faria papers (the last two: 2007a and 2007b).

The following list includes some of the elements proposed as components of Iberian names: abaŕ, aibe, aile, ain, aitu, aiun, aker, albe, aloŕ, an, anaŕ, aŕbi, aŕki, aŕs, asai, aster, ata, atin, atun, aunin, auŕ, austin, baiser, balaŕ, balke, bartaś, baś, bastok, bekon, belauŕ, beleś, bels, bene, beŕ, beri, beŕon, betan, betin, bikir, bilos, bin, bir, bitu, biuŕ, bolai, boŕ, boś, boton, ekes, ekaŕ, eler, ena, esto, eten, eter, iar, iaun, ibeś, ibeis, ike, ikoŕ, iltiŕ, iltur, inte, iskeŕ, istan, iunstir, iur, kaisur, kakeŕ, kaltuŕ, kani, kaŕes, kaŕko, katu, keŕe, kibaś, kine, kitaŕ, kon, koŕo, koŕś, kuleś, kurtar, lako, lauŕ, leis, lor, lusban, nalbe, neitin, neŕse, nes, niś, nios, oŕtin, sakaŕ, sakin, saltu, śani, śar, seken, selki, sike, sili, sine, sir, situ, soket, sor, sosin, suise, taker, talsku, tan, tanek, taneś, taŕ, tarban, taŕtin, taś, tautin, teita, tekeŕ, tibaś, tikeŕ, tikirs, tikis, tileis, tolor, tuitui, tumar, tuŕś, turkir, tortin, ulti, unin, uŕke, ustain, ḿbaŕ, nḿkei.

In some cases, linguists have encountered simple names, with only one element for a suffix: BELES, AGER-DO and BIVR-NO are in the plaque of Ascoli, neitin in Ullastret and lauŕ-to, bartas-ko or śani-ko in other Iberian texts. More rarely there have been indications of a linking element, which can be -i-, -ke- or -ta- (Untermann used oto-iltiŕ in front of oto-ke-iltiŕ or with AEN-I-BELES). In rare cases Untermann also encountered an element is- or o- prefacing a proper name (is-betartiker; o-tikiŕtekeŕ; O-ASAI).

In the elements that formed Iberian names it is common to encounter patterns of variation, as in eter/eten/ete with the same variations as in iltur/iltun/iltu; kere/keres as lako/lakos; or alos/alor/alo and bikis/bikir/biki).

Some Iberian onomastic elements have look-alikes in Aquitanian or Basque. This has been explained by Vascologists like Mitxelena as an "onomastic pool". However, since the meaning of most Iberian words remains opaque to date, the connection remains speculative except in a very small number of cases. An ancient sprachbund involving these two languages is deemed likely by some linguists. But as Trask notes, Basque has been of no help in translating Iberian inscriptions.

== External relations ==
=== Iberian and Basque ===
Whether Iberian and Basque are two languages of the same language family is still a much-debated question. Many experts on Iberian suspect that there is a relationship of some sort between Iberian and Aquitanian, a precursor of the Basque language. But there is not enough evidence to date to ascertain whether the two languages belong to the same language family or whether the relationship is due to linguistic borrowing. Lexical and onomastic coincidences could be due to borrowing, while the similarities in the phonological structures of the two languages could be due to linguistic areal phenomena (cf. the similarities between Basque and Old Spanish in spite of being languages of two different families). More scientific studies on the Iberian language are needed to shed light on this question.

From a historical perspective, the first features where a relationship between Basque and Iberian was claimed were:

- the suffixes -sken / -ken on Iberian coins (which were compared to the genitive plural on similar ancient coins) with the Basque plural (-k) and genitive (-en) endings
- Iberian town names containing ili (particularly iliberri), where parallels were drawn with Basque hiri ("town") and berri ("new").

Although other pairs have been proposed (such as eban, ars, -ka, -te), the meanings of these Iberian morphs are still controversial. The main arguments today which relate to coinciding surface forms between Basque and Iberian are:

- Phonetics: Proto-Basque phonology, first proposed by Michelena, appears to be very similar to what is known about the Iberian phonological system. It has been claimed that the lack of /m/, common to both Proto-Basque and Iberian, is especially significant).
- Onomastics: Aquitanian-Latin inscriptions contain personal and deity names which can clearly be related to modern Basque words, but also show structural and lexical resemblances with Iberian personal names. But Iberian influence on the Aquitanian name system, rather than a genetic link, cannot be dismissed either.
- In Iberian iltiŕ and iltur, ili is read "city". Modern Basque hiri, "city", is derived from the very similar Proto-Basque root *ili.
- The Iberian genitive ending -en and maybe the genitive plural -(s)ken, compared to the Basque genitive -en and the Basque genitive plural *ag-en as reconstructed by Michelena. But Michelena himself was sceptical about this comparison.
- An Iberian formula which frequently appears on tombstones, aŕe take, with variants such as aŕe teike, which on a bilingual inscription from Tarragona may be equivalent to the Latin hic situs est ("here is"), as proposed by Hübner. This was compared by Schuchardt (1907) with Basque (h)ara dago "there is/stays".
- The Iberian word ekiar, explained as something akin to "he made", proposed to be linked with the Basque verb egin "make"
- The Iberian word śalir explained as "money", "coin" or "value", proposed to be linked to Basque word sari (probably Proto-Basque *sali) meaning "value", "payment", "reward".

==== Numerals ====
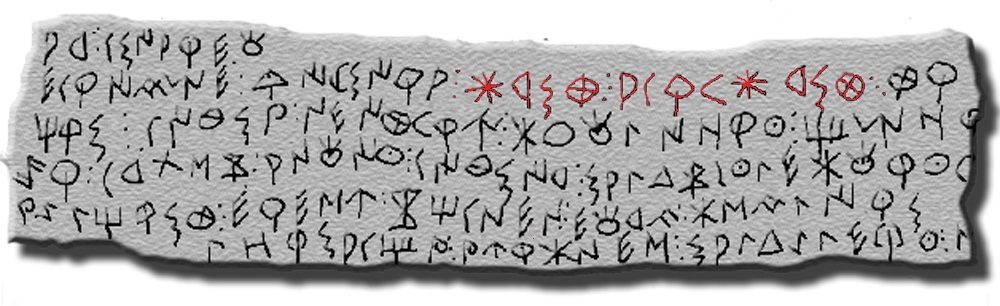
Theorized numerals (in red): "borste-abaŕkeborste", in the text of Ullastret.

In 2005 Eduardo Orduña published a study showing some Iberian compounds that according to contextual data would appear to be Iberian numerals and show striking similarities with Basque numerals. The study was expanded upon by Joan Ferrer (2007 and 2009) based on terms found on coins, stating their value, and with new combinatorial and contextual data. The comparison proposes the following:

Iberian	Iberian meaning	Proto-Basque	Modern Basque and meaning
erder / erdi-	"half"		erdi "half"
ban	"one"	*badV / *bade?	bat "one" (but cf -n final compound forms such as bana "one each")
bi / bin	"two"	biga	bi (older biga) "two" (also cf -n final compound forms such as bina "two each")
irur	"three"	hirur	hiru(r) "three"
laur	"four"	laur	lau(r) "four"
borste / bors	"five"	bortz / *bortzV?	bost (older bortz) "five"
śei	"six"	sei	sei "six"
sisbi	"seven"		zazpi "seven"
sorse	"eight"	zortzi	*zortzi "eight"
abaŕ / baŕ	"ten"	*[h]anbar ?	hamar "ten"
oŕkei	"twenty"	*(h)ogei	hogei "twenty"

The basis of this theory is better understood if we compare some of the attested Iberian compounds with Basque complex numbers (the dots denote morpheme boundaries and are not normally written in Basque; also note that the final -r in numbers 3 and 4 also occurs in bound forms in Basque i.e. hirur- and laur-):

Iberian word	Basque comparison	Basque Meaning	Basque analysis
abaŕ-ke-bi	hama.bi	"twelve"	"10-2"
abaŕ-ke-borste	hama.bost	"fifteen"	"10-5"
abaŕ-śei	hama.sei	"sixteen"	"10-6"
oŕkei-irur	hogei.ta.hiru	"twenty three"	"20 and 3"
oŕkei-ke-laur	hogei.ta.lau	"twenty four"	"20 and 4"
oŕkei-abaŕ	hogei.ta.(ha)mar	"thirty"	"20 and 10"
oŕkei-(a)baŕ-ban	hogei.ta.(ha)maika	"thirty one"	"20 and 11"

Even so, Orduña does not claim this comparison to be a proof of a family relation between Iberian and Basque, but rather owing to Iberian loanwords in the Basque language. In contrast, Ferrer believes that the similarities could be caused due to both the genetic relationship or the loan, but indicates that the loan of the entire system of numerals is rare (but has been known to occur such as the case of Middle Chinese numerals being borrowed wholesale into Vietnamese, Japanese, Korean and Thai).

Joseba Lakarra (2010) has rejected both hypotheses: loan and genetic relationship. Lakarra's arguments focus almost exclusively on the field of Basque historical grammar, but also argue, following de Hoz's (1993) hypothesis, that the hypothesis of the borrowing has already turned out to be implausible due to the limited and remote extension of the territory where Iberian was spoken as first language in South-East Spain.

Javier de Hoz (2011, pp. 196–198) considers plausible the internal contextual and combinatorial arguments that would support the hypothesis that these Iberian elements could be interpreted as numerals. In fact, concerning the specific values, he considers valid the proposed equivalences between Iberian ban with 'one' and between Iberian erder with 'half', according to the marks of value found in coins, while he considers that the rest of the proposed equivalences are a working hypothesis. Regarding the equivalence between the possible Iberian numerals and the Basque numerals, he agrees with Lakarra (2010) that the shape of the documented Iberian forms does not fit the expected Proto-Basque forms. Finally, he considers that the greatest difficulty in accepting this hypothesis is, paradoxically, its extent and systematic nature, because if it was correct, it would result in a close relationship between Iberian and Basque, which should allow the identification of other relationships between Iberian and Basque subsystems, as clearly as this one, relationships that no investigator using reasonable linguistic arguments has been able to identify.

Eduardo Orduña (2011) insists that the Iberian elements proposed as numerals are not only similar to the Basque numerals, but also combine as numerals and appear in contexts where numerals are expected. He observes Lakarra (2010) does not dispute these arguments [neither does de Hoz (2010)]. As regards the de Hoz hypothesis about considering the Iberian language as a lingua franca, Orduña notes its hypothetical character, although Lakarra presents that hypothesis as an established fact. The problems with this hypothesis have been collected by Ferrer (2013) in a later work. Regarding the phonetic difficulties indicated by Lakarra, Orduña argues that its proposals are compatible with the Proto-Basque reconstructed by Michelena, which is for chronology and security the reconstruction that an iberist has to consider, while the hypothesis of internal Basque reconstruction of Lakarra has a vague chronology and a much lower degree of security. Finally, contrary to his first opinion in favor of the loan, concludes that the most economical hypothesis to explain the similarities between the Iberian numeral system and the Basque numeral system is the genetic relationship.

Francisco Villar (2014, 259) notes that the similarities between Iberian numerals and Basque numerals are of the same order as those documented among Indo-European languages and consequently argues that the only sustainable hypothesis at this point is the genetic relationship between Iberian and Basque. Villar also believes that if the reconstruction of Proto-Basque proposed by Lakarra (2010) is incompatible with the evidence derived from the numerals, the reconstruction must be corrected as it is, like all reconstructions, hypothetical and perfectible.

== See also ==
- Paleohispanic languages
- Iberians
- Iberian scripts
- Paleohispanic scripts
- Celtiberian language
- Iberian Romance languages

== Bibliography ==
=== General works ===
- Anderson, James, M. (1988) Ancient Languages of the Hispanic Peninsula, University Press of America, New York, ISBN 0-8191-6732-0
- Ballester, Xaverio (2005) Lengua ibérica: hacia un debate tipológico, Palaeohispanica 5, pp. 361–392.
- Correa Rodríguez, José Antonio (1994) La lengua ibérica, Revista Española de Lingüística 24/2, pp. 263–287.
- de Hoz Bravo, Javier

(1998) La epigrafía ibérica de los noventa, Revista de Estudios Ibéricos 3, pp. 127–151.
(2001) Hacia una tipología del ibérico, Religión, lengua y cultura preromanas de Hispania, pp. 335–362.
(2011) Historia lingüística de la Península Ibérica en la Antigüedad II. El mundo ibérico prerromano y la indoeuropeización, Madrid, ISBN 978-84-00-09405-8.

- Panosa Domingo, Mª. Isabel (1999) La escritura ibérica en Cataluña y su contexto socioeconómico (siglos V-I a. C.), Argitalpen Zerbitzua, Euskal Herriko Unibertsitatea, Vitoria-Gasteiz, ISBN 84-8373-160-6.
- Rodríguez Ramos, Jesús (2004) Análisis de Epigrafía Íbera, Vitoria-Gasteiz, ISBN 84-8373-678-0.
- Untermann, Jürgen

(1980) Monumenta Linguarum Hispanicarum II: Die Inschriften in iberischer Schrift in Südfrankreich, Reichert Verlag, Wiesbaden, ISBN 978-3-88226-098-4.
(1990) Monumenta Linguarum Hispanicarum. III Die iberischen Inschriften aus Spanien, Reichert Verlag, Wiesbaden, ISBN 978-3-88226-491-3.
(1996) Los plomos ibéricos: estado actual de su interpretación, Estudios de lenguas y epigrafía antiguas – ELEA 2, pp. 75–108.
(2001) Die vorrömischen Sprachen der iberischen Halbinsel. Wege und Aporien bei ihrer Entzifferung, Westdeutscher Verlag, Wiesbaden, ISBN 3-531-07375-3.
(2005) La lengua ibérica en el sur de Francia in Oriol Mercadal Fernández (coord) Món ibèric : als Països Catalans : XIII Col•loqui Internacional d'Arqueologia de Puigcerdà : homenatge a Josep Barberà i Farràs : Puigcerdà, 14 i 15 de novembre de 2003 Vol. 2, ISBN 84-933111-2-X, pp. 1083–1100.

- Valladolid Moya, Juana (1997) La epigrafía ibérica: estado actual de los estudios, Tempus. Revista de Actualización Científica, 17, pp. 5–53.
- Velaza, Javier (1996) Epigrafía y lengua ibéricas, Barcelona.

=== Iberian writing ===
- Correa Rodríguez, José Antonio (2004) Los semisilabarios ibéricos: algunas cuestiones, Estudios de lenguas y epigrafía Antiguas – ELEA 5, 75-98.
- de Hoz Bravo, Javier

(1985–86) La escritura greco-ibérica, Veleia 2-3, pp. 285–298
(1989) El desarrollo de la escritura y las lenguas de la zona meridional, Tartessos: Arqueología protohistórica del bajo Guadalquivir, pp. 523–587.

- Ferrer i Jané, Joan (2005) Novetats sobre el sistema dual de diferenciació gràfica de les oclusives sordes i sonores, Palaeohispanica 5, pp. 957–982.
- Rodríguez Ramos, Jesús (2002) La escritura ibérica meridional, Zephyrus: Revista de prehistoria y arqueología 55, pp. 231–245.

=== Lexicon, phonology and grammar ===
- Ballester, Xaverio

(2001) Fono(tipo)logía de las (con)sonantes (celt)ibéricas, Religión, lengua y cultura prerromanas de Hispania, 287-303, Salamanca.
(2003) El acento en la reconstrucción lingüística: el caso ibérico, Palaeohispánica 3, pp. 43–57

- Correa Rodríguez, José Antonio

(1994) La transcripción de las vibrantes en la escriptura paleohispanica, Archivo de Prehistoria Levantina 21, pp. 337–341.
(1999) Las nasales en ibérico, Pueblos, lenguas y escrituras en la Hispania preromana, pp. 375–396, Salamanca.
(2001) Las silbantes en ibérico, in Francisco Villar, María Pilar Fernández Alvárez (coords) Religión, lengua y cultura prerromanas de Hispania ISBN 84-7800-893-4, pp. 305–318.

- de Hoz Bravo, Javier

(1981) Algunas precisiones sobre textos metrológicos ibéricos, Archivo de Prehitoria Levantina 40, pp. 475–486.
(2002) El complejo sufijal -(e)sken de la lengua ibérica, Palaeohispánica 2, pp. 159–168
(2003) Las sibilantes ibéricas, in S. Marchesini & P. Poccetti (eds) Linguistica è storia. Sprachwissenschaft ist Geschichte. Scritti in onore di Carlo de Simone, Pisa, 85-97.

- Faria António M. de

(2007) Crónica de onomástica paleo-hispânica (13), Revista Portuguesa de Arqueologia 10:2, 161-187.
(2016) Crónica de onomástica paleo-hispânica (25), ARSE nº 50, pp 109-140. ISSN 0213-8026.

- Ferrer i Jané, Joan.

(2006) Nova lectura de la inscripció ibèrica de La Joncosa (Jorba, Barcelona), Veleia 23, pp. 129–170.
(2007) Sistemes de marques de valor lèxiques sobre monedes ibèriques, Acta Numismàtica 37, pp. 53–73.
(2009) "El sistema de numerales ibérico: avances en su conocimiento", Palaeohispanica 9, pp. 451–479.

- Ferrer i Jané, Joan & Giral Royo, Francesc (2007) A propósito de un semis de Ildiŕda con leyenda erder. Marcas de valor léxicas sobre monedas ibéricas, Palaeohispanica 7, pp. 83–89.
- Fletcher Valls, Domingo (1992) Iunstir, palabra ibérica, ARSE nº 28-29, pp 155–173. ISSN 0213-8026.
- Lakarra Joseba (2010) Haches, diptongos y otros detalles de alguna importancia: notas sobre numerales (proto)vascos y comparación vasco-ibérica (con un apéndice sobre hiri y otro sobre bat-bi), Veleia 27, pp. 191–238.
- Luján Martínez, Eugenio Ramón (2005) Los topónimos en las inscripciones ibéricas, Palaeohispanica 5, pp. 471–490.
- Moncunill Martí, Noemí (2007) Lèxic d'inscripcions ibèriques (1991–2006), doctoral dissertation, UB-Barcelona.
- Orduña Aznar, Eduardo

(2005) Sobre algunos posibles numerales en textos ibéricos, Palaeohispanica 5, pp. 491–506.
(2006) Segmentación de textos ibéricos y distribución de los segmentos, doctoral dissertation, UNED-Madrid (unpublished doctoral dissertation).
(2008) Ergatividad en ibérico Emerita Vol. 76, Nº 2, pp. 275–302
(2011) Los numerales ibéricos y el protovasco, Veleia 28, pp. 125-139.

- Pérez Orozco, Santiago (2009) Construcciones posesivas en ibérico, Estudios de lenguas y epigrafía antiguas – ELEA 9, pp. 561–578
- Quintanilla Niño, Alberto

(1998) Estudios de Fonología Ibérica, Vitoria-Gasteiz, ISBN 84-8373-041-3.
(2005) Palabras de contenido verbal en ibérico, Palaeohispanica 5, pp. 507–520.

- Rodríguez Ramos, Jesús

(2000b) Vocales y consonantes nasales en la lengua íbera, Faventia 22, Fasc. 2, pp. 25–37.
(2002) Índice crítico de formantes de compuesto de tipo onomástico en la lengua íbera, Cypsela 14, pp. 251–275.
(2002b) Problemas y cuestiones metodológicas en la identificación de los compuestos de tipo onomástico de la lengua íbera, ARSE Nº 36, pp. 15–50. ISSN 0213-8026.
(2004) Sobre los fonemas sibilantes de la lengua íbera, Habis 35, pp. 135–150

- Siles Ruiz, Jaime (1985) Léxico de inscripciones ibéricas, Ministerio de Cultura, Dirección General de Bellas Artes y Archivos, Madrid, ISBN 978-84-505-1735-4.
- Silgo Gauche, Luis

(1994) Léxico Ibérico, Estudios de Lenguas y Epigrafía Antiguas – ELEA, ISSN 1135-5026, Nº. 1, pages 1–271.
(2007) Las palabras "dinero" y "plata" en Ibérico, Palaeohispanica, nº 7, pp 219-222.

- Tolosa Leal, Antonio (1996): "Sobre el ibérico SELDAR", ARSE. nº 30-31, pp 119–122. ISSN 0213-8026.
- Untermann, Jürgen

(1984) Inscripciones sepulcrales ibéricas, Cuadernos de prehistoria y arqueología Castellonenses 10, pp. 111–120
(1985–1986) Las gramática de los plomos ibéricos, Veleia 2-3, pp. 35–56.
(1998) La onomástica ibérica, Iberia 1, pp. 73–85.
(1999) Über den Umgang mit iberischen Bilinguen in E. Seebold, W. Schindler & J. Untermann Grippe, Kamm und Eulenspiegel: Festschrift für Elmar Seebold zum 65. Geburtstag ISBN 978-3-11-015617-1, pp. 349–358.

- Velaza Frías, Javier

(1991) Léxico de inscripciones ibéricas: (1976–1989), Universitat Autònoma de Barcelona, ISBN 84-7875-556-X.
(1994) Iberisch EBAN TEBAN Zeitschrift für Papyrologie und Epigraphik 104, 142-150.
(2004) Eban, teban, diez años después, Estudios de lenguas y epigrafía antiguas – ELEA 5, pp. 199–210.
(2002) Ibérico-te, Palaeohispánica 2, pp. 271–275.
(2006) Tras las huellas del femenino en ibérico: una hipótesis de trabajo, Palaeohispánica 6, pp. 247–254

=== Origins and relationships ===
- Ballester, Xaverio (2001) Las adfinitas de las lenguas aquitania e ibérica Palaeohispánica 1, 2001, pp. 21–33.
- Ferrer i Jané, Joan (2013) Los problemas de la hipótesis de la lengua ibérica como lengua vehicular, E.L.E.A. 13, 115-157.
- de Hoz Bravo, Javier (1993) La lengua y la escritura ibéricas y las lenguas de los iberos, Lengua y cultura en Hispania prerromana : actas del V Coloquio sobre lenguas y culturas de la Península Ibérica : (Colonia 25-28 de Noviembre de 1989) (Francisco Villar and Jürgen Untermann, eds.), ISBN 84-7481-736-6, Salamanca, pp. 635–666.
- Gorrochategui Churruca, Joaquín (1993) La onomástica aquitana y su relación con la ibérica, Lengua y cultura en Hispania prerromana : actas del V Coloquio sobre lenguas y culturas de la Península Ibérica : (Colonia 25-28 de Noviembre de 1989) (Francisco Villar and Jürgen Untermann, eds.), ISBN 84-7481-736-6, Salamanca, pp. 609–634.
- Rodríguez Ramos, Jesús

(2001) La cultura ibérica desde la perspectiva de la epigrafía: un ensayo de síntesis, Iberia: Revista de la Antigüedad 4, pp. 17–38.
(2002) La hipótesis del vascoiberismo desde el punto de vista de la epigrafía íbera, Fontes linguae vasconum: Studia et documenta, 90, pp. 197–218, ISSN 0046-435X.

- Velaza Frías, Javier (2006) Lengua vs. cultura material: el (viejo) problema de la lengua indígena de Cataluña, Actes de la III Reunió Internacional d'Arqueologia de Calafell (Calafell, 25 al 27 de novembre de 2004), Arqueo Mediterrània 9, 273-280.
- Villar, Francisco (2014): Indoeuropeos, iberos, vascos y sus parientes, Estratigrafía y cronología de las poblaciones prehistóricas, Universidad de Salamanca, Estudios Filológicos.
