= Santa Fosca =

Santa Fosca may refer to:

- Fusca of Ravenna (died c. 250), a child saint of the Roman Catholic Church
- Santa Fosca, Venice, a church named after and dedicated to Fusca of Ravenna
- Church of Santa Fosca, a different church in Venice that is part of the Torcello Cathedral, also dedicated to Fusca of Ravenna
