= Ullastret =

- Municipality
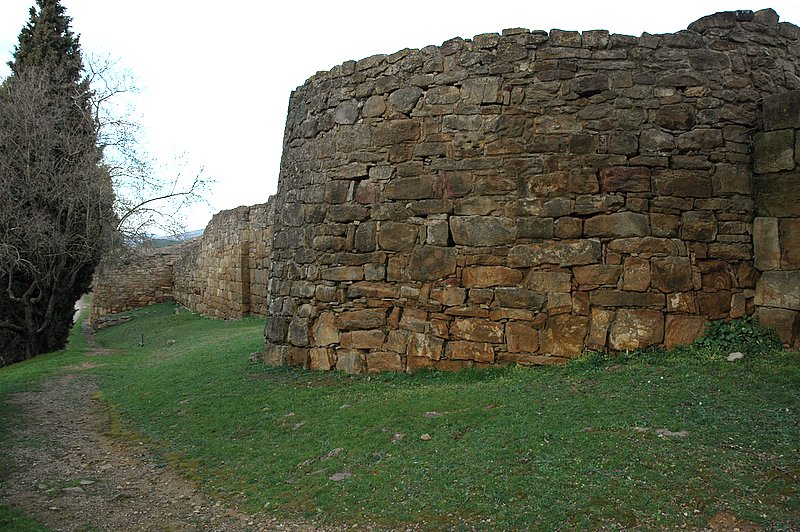

- Flag Coat of arms

- Location in Catalonia Ullastret (Spain)
- Coordinates: 42.000548°N 3.068483°E
- Country: Spain
- Community: Catalonia
- Province: Girona
- Comarca: Baix Empordà

Government
  - Mayor: Josep Miquel Gatius Callís (2015)

Area
  - Total: 11.1 km^{2} (4.3 sq mi)
- Elevation: 49 m (161 ft)

Population (2025-01-01)
  - Total: 249
  - Density: 22.4/km^{2} (58.1/sq mi)
- Website: www.ullastret.cat

Ullastret (Catalan pronunciation: [uʎəsˈtɾɛt]) is a small historic village on the Bay of Empordà located some 5 km northeast of La Bisbal d'Empordà, in Catalonia.

In prehistoric times the village was probably on an island in the former 3 km^{2} lake, known as Llac d'Ullastret or Estany d'Ullastret, connected by a causway, but the lake dried up in the 19th century.

It is home to ancient Iberian archaeological remains, in particular much of the thick walls around the village are ancient. There is a medieval church known from the 9th century, dedicated to SS. Paul and Peter. The economy is based mostly on tourism and agriculture.

== Gallery ==
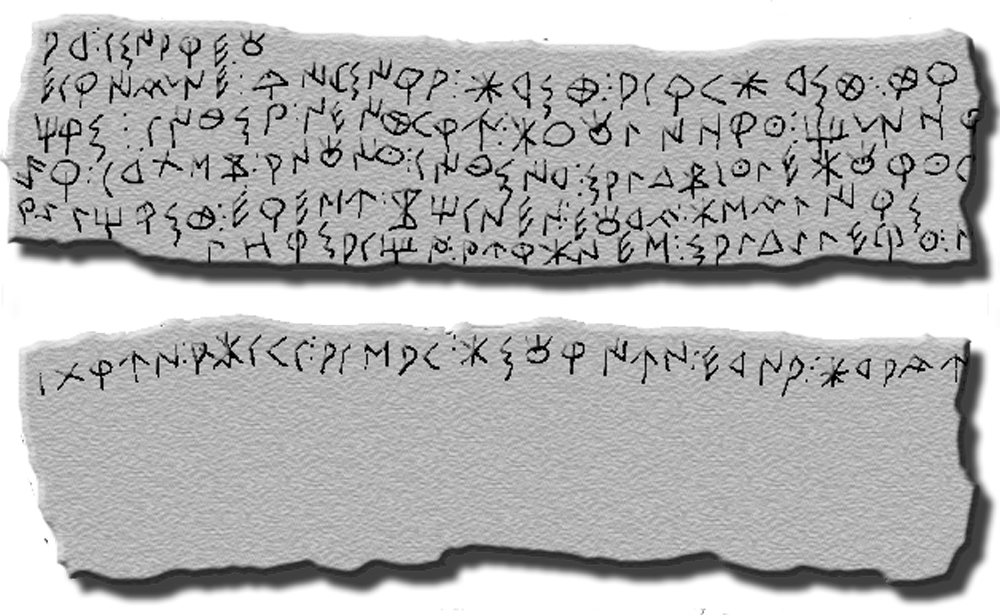
Inscribed lead plate from the Ullastret Iberian archaeological site

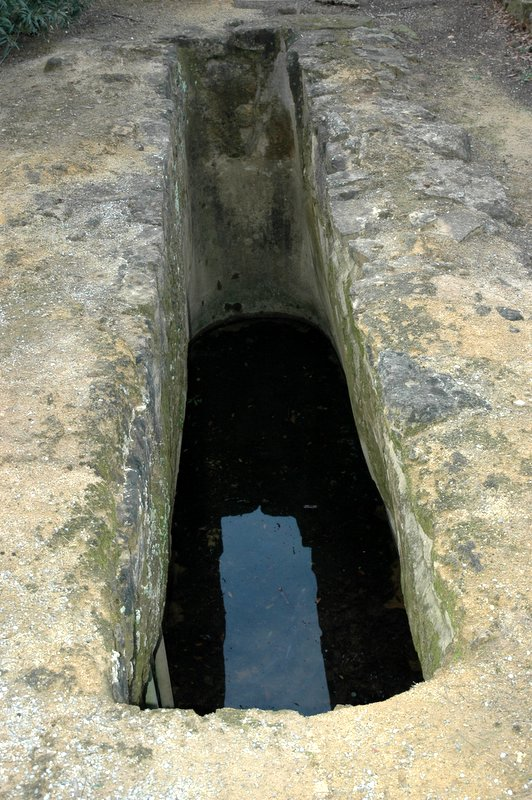
Cistern at the Ullastret site

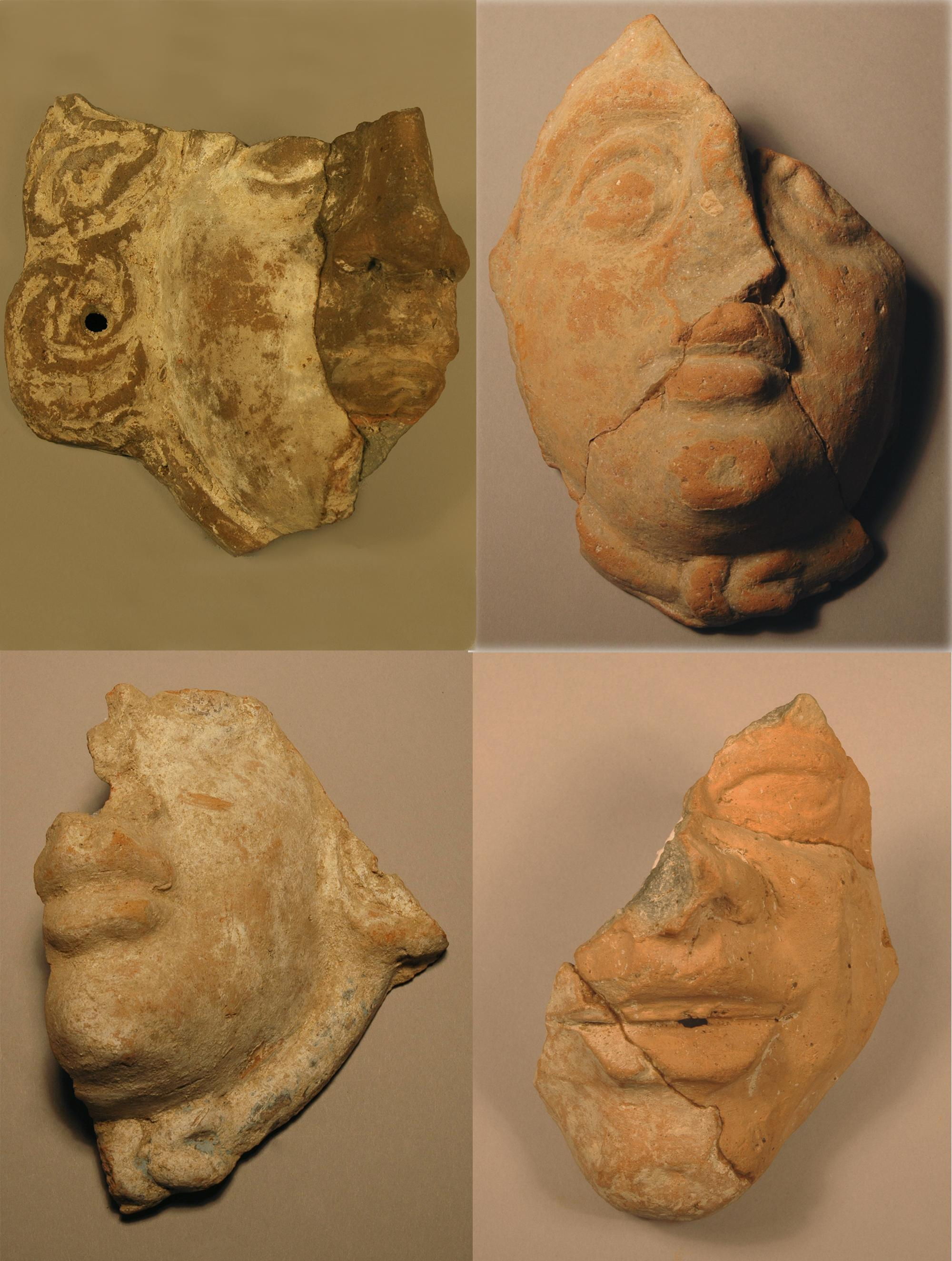
Terracota masks

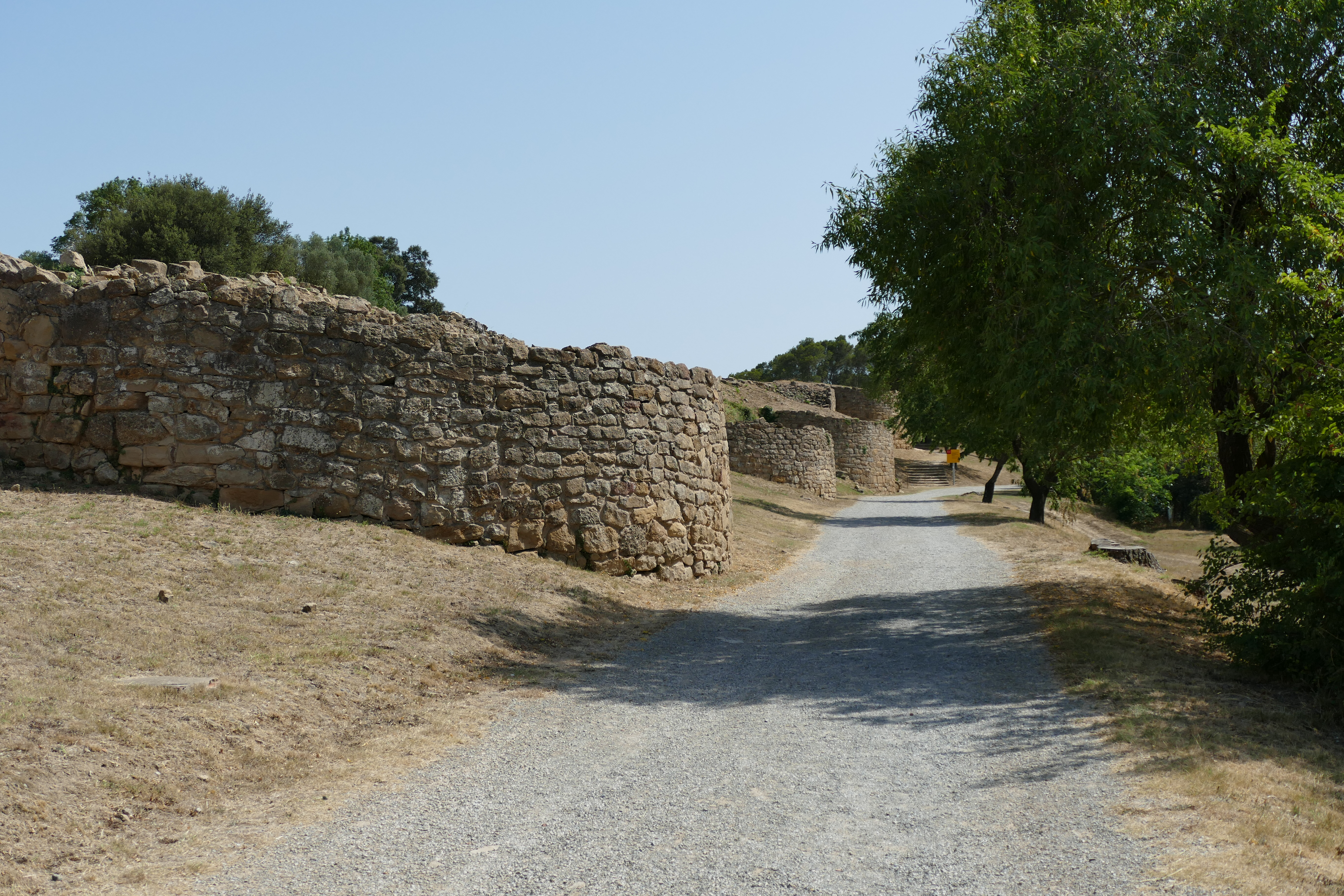
Walls

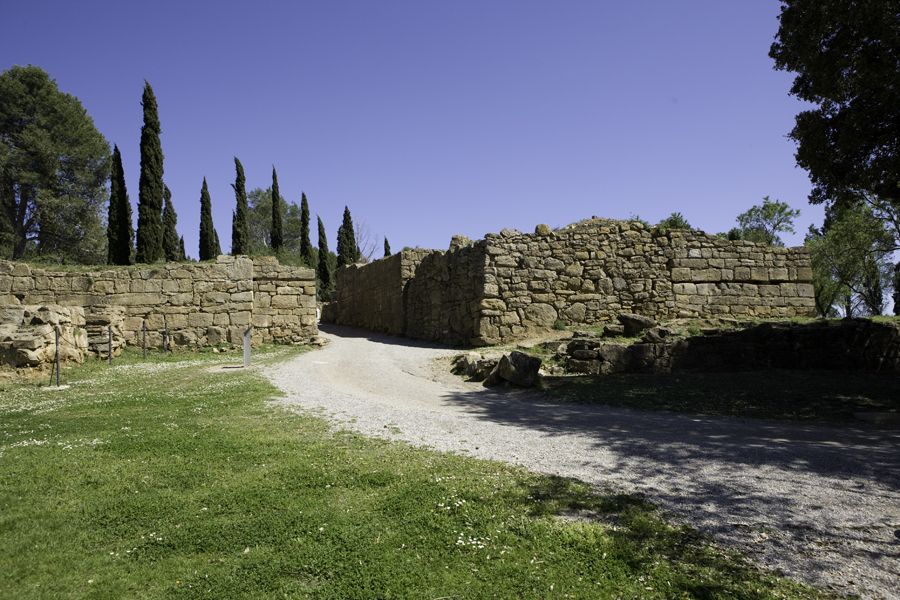
Walls

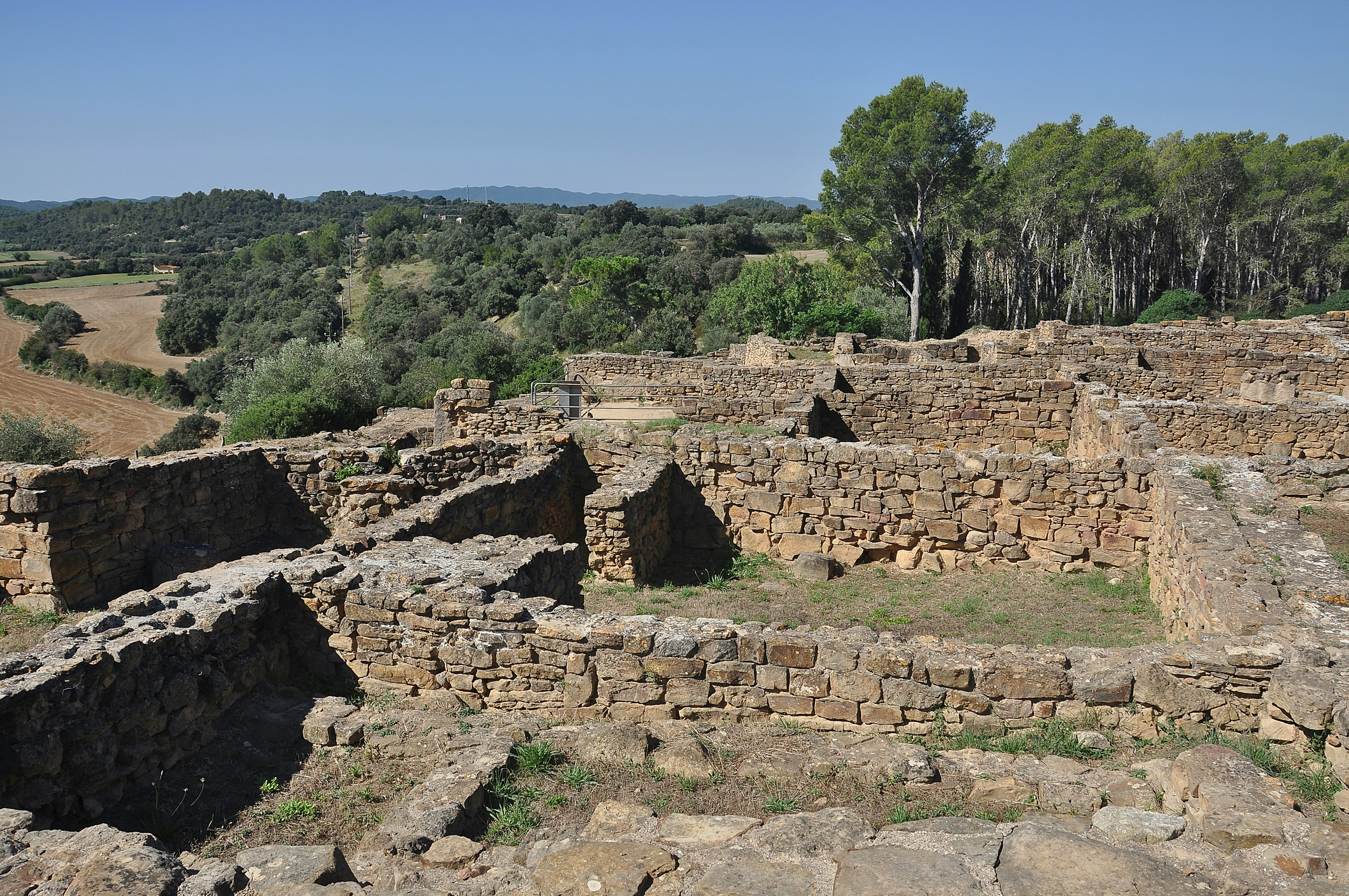
Building remains

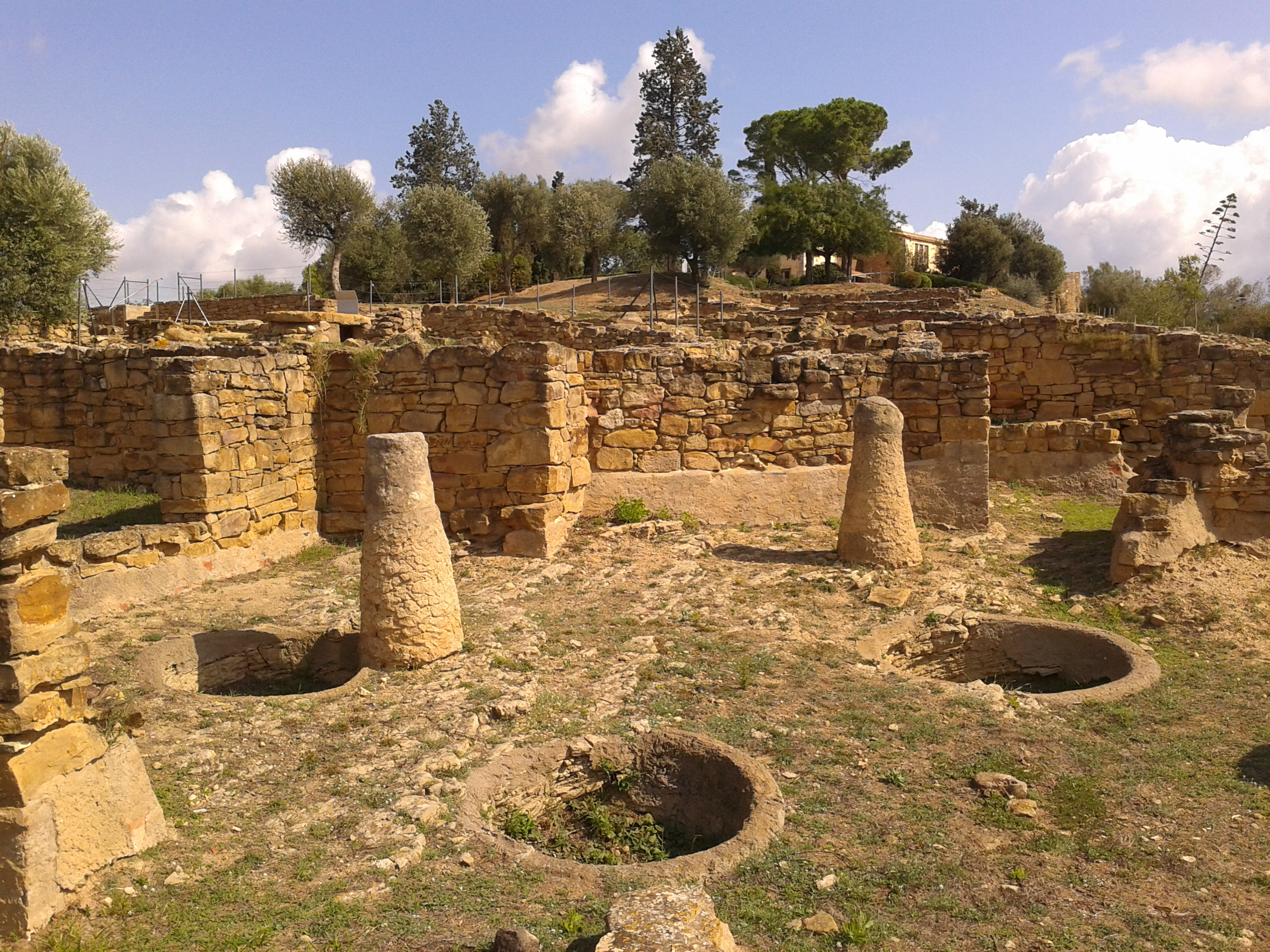
Building remains

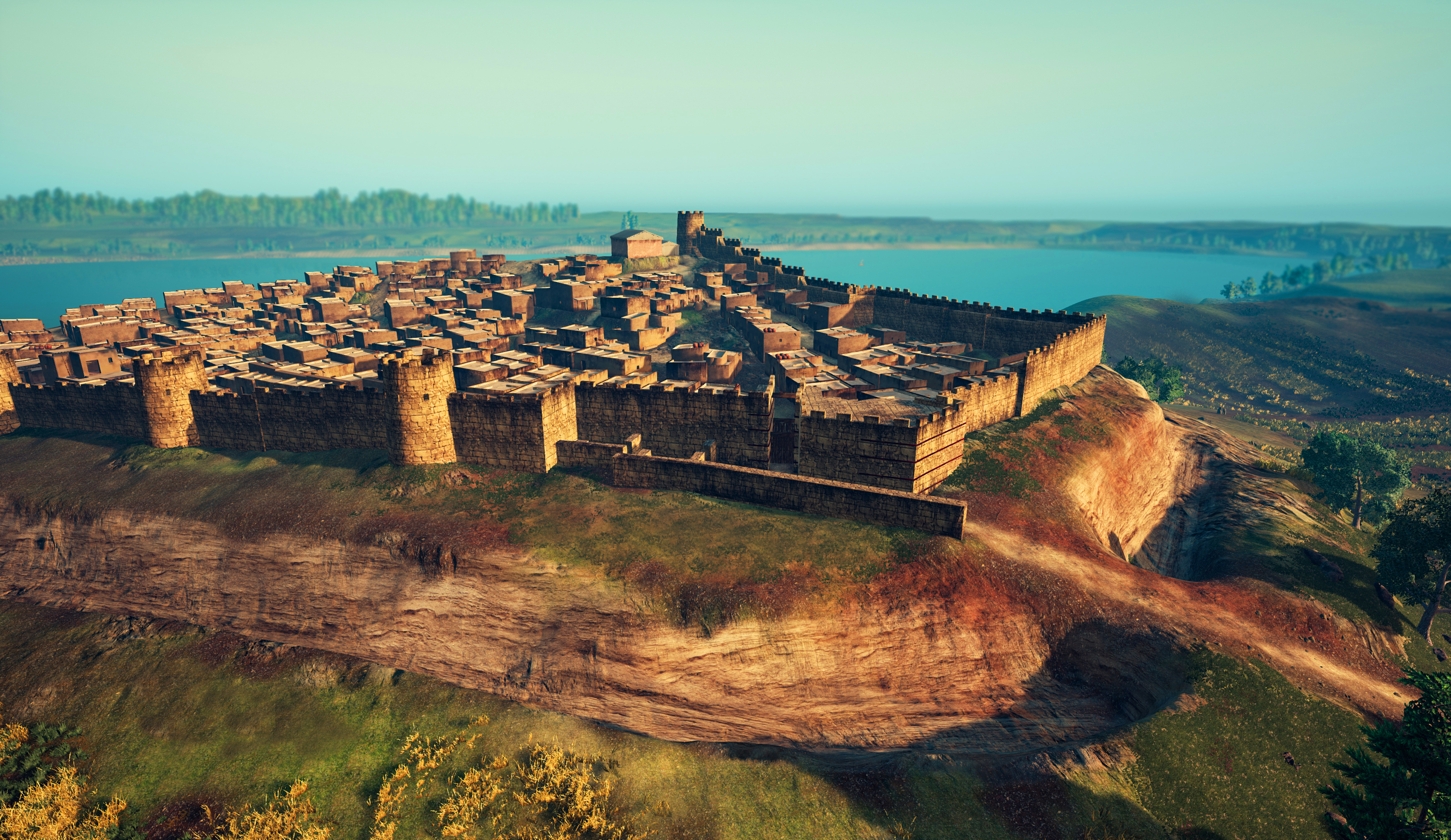
Digital reconstruction of Iberian Ullastret

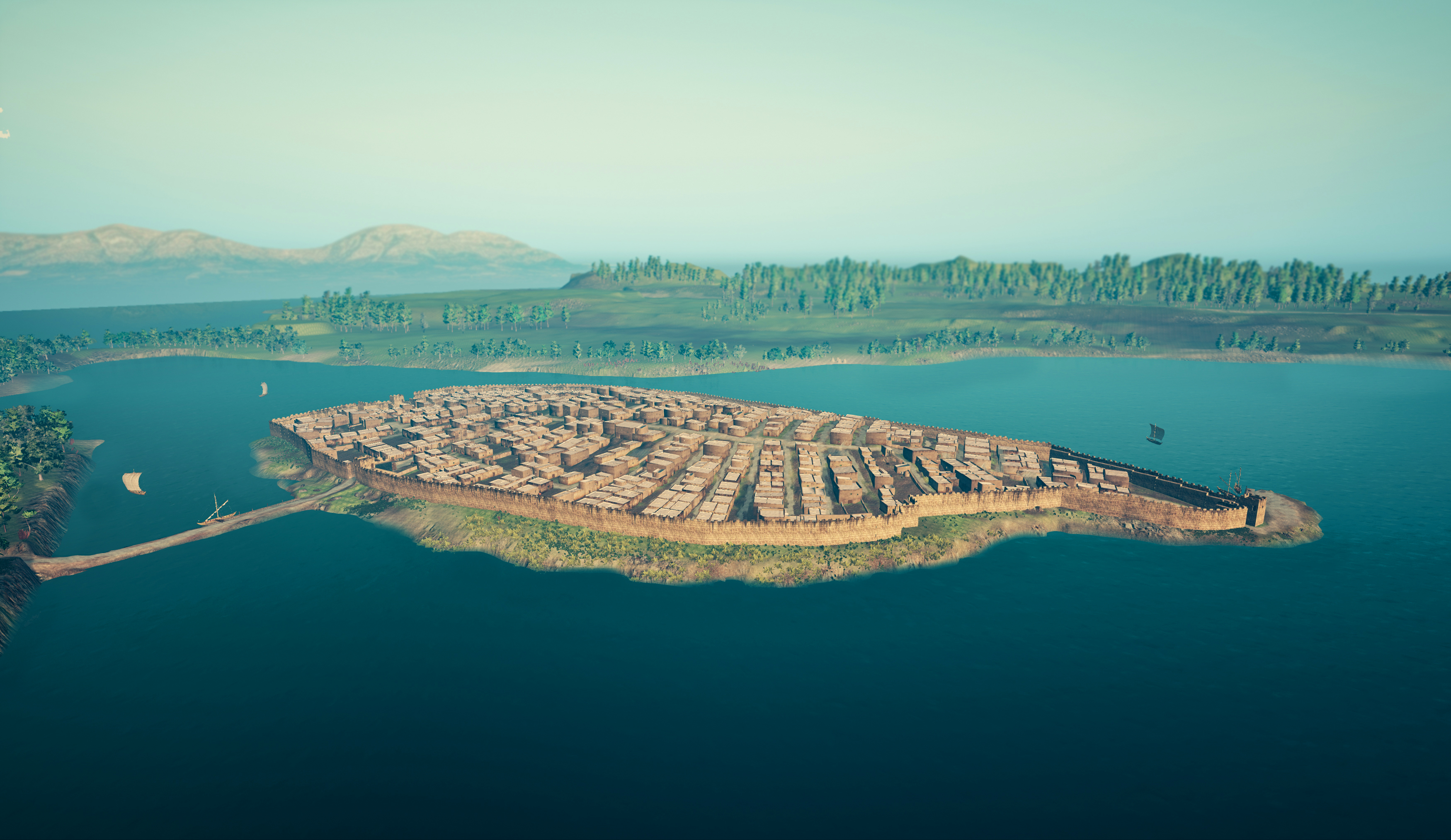
Digital reconstruction

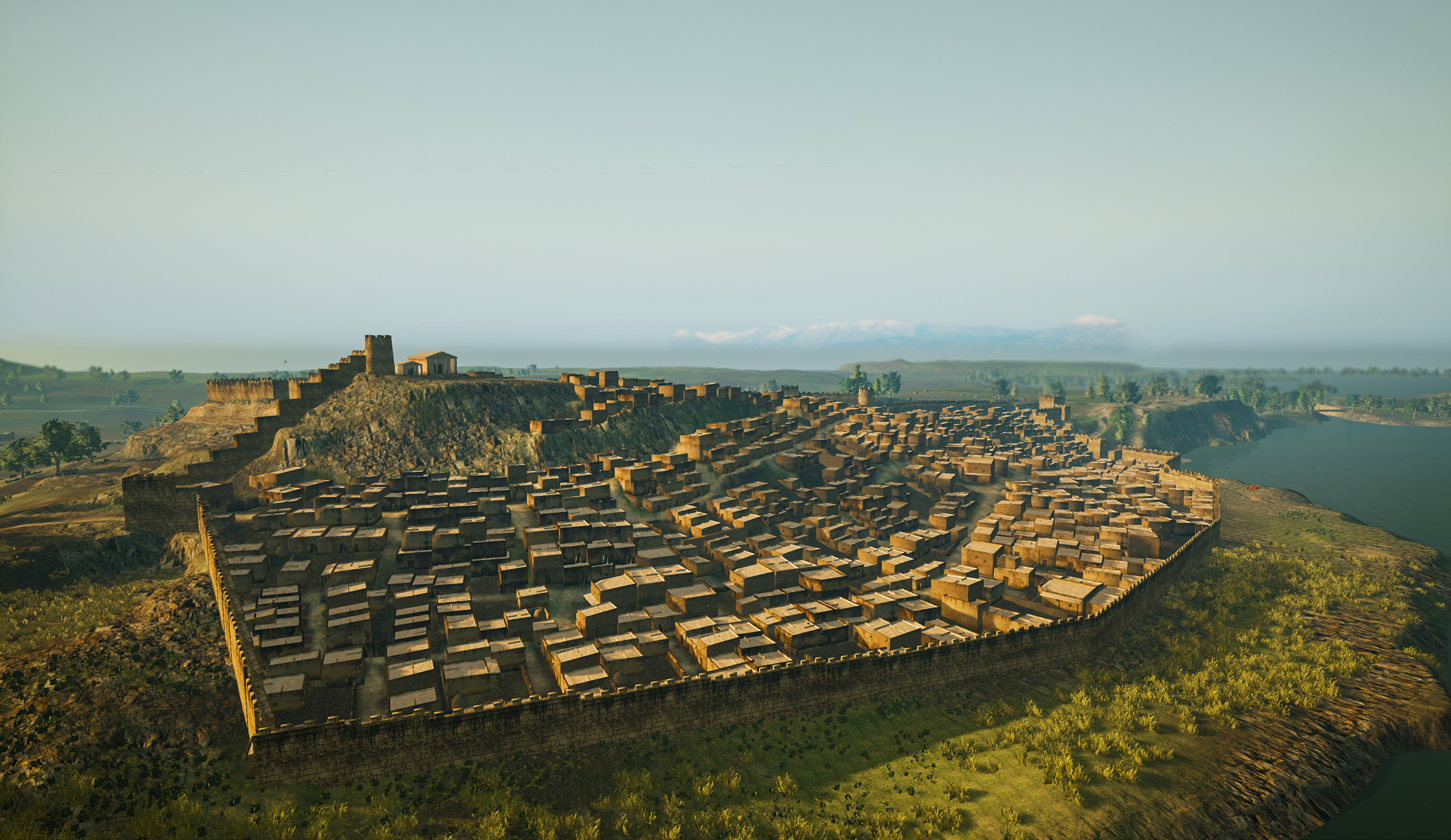
Digital reconstruction

== See also ==
- Indigetes
- Prehistoric Iberia
