= Castell de la Fosca =

- Poblat ibèric de Castell (Catalan)
- Iberian Town of Castell
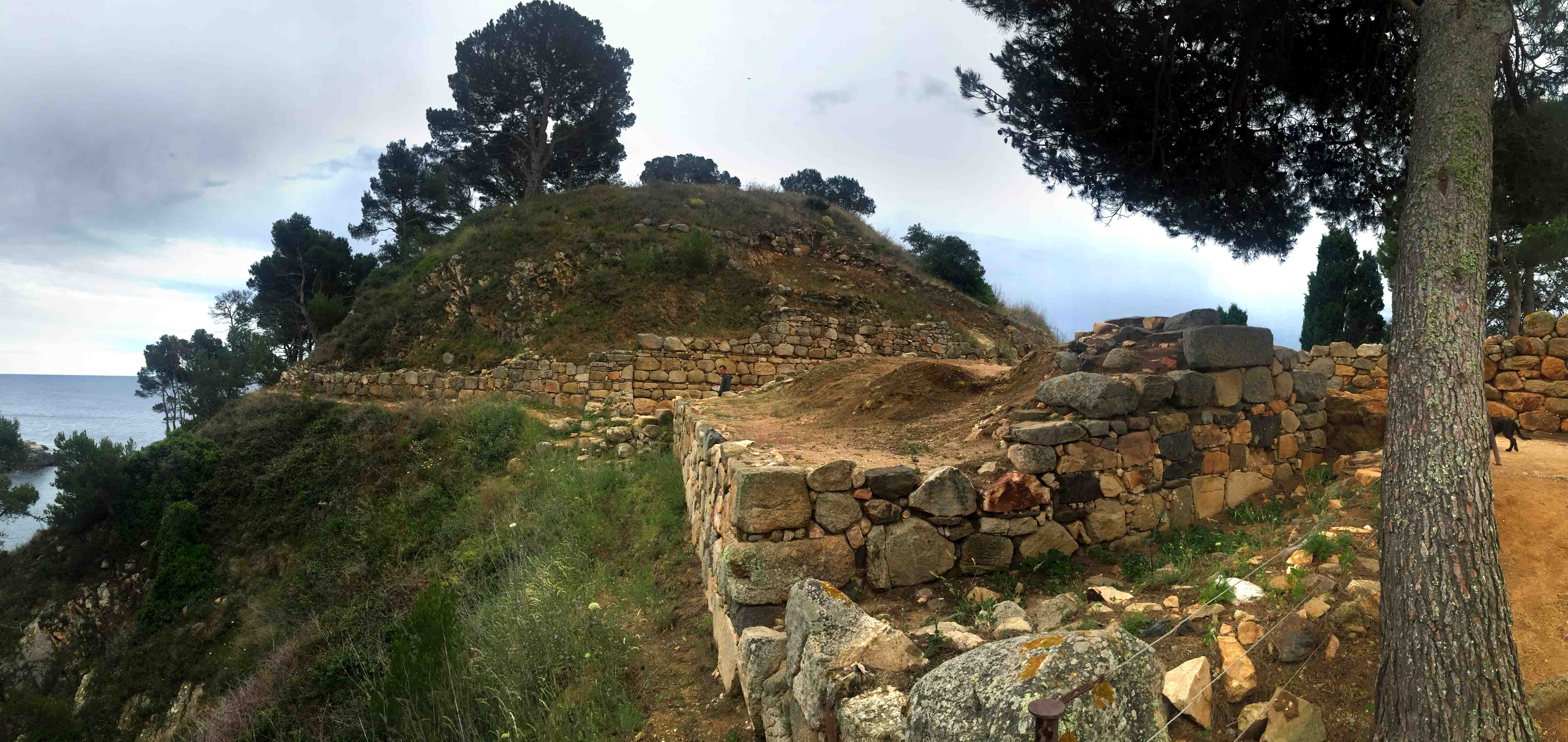
- entrance to the Castell de la Fosca

- Location in Catalonia
- 41°51′37″N 3°9′32″E
- Type: settlement
- Cultures: Iberian Indigetes
- Location: Cala de Castell, Palamós, Catalonia, Spain
- Region: Iberian Peninsula

History
- Built: 6th century BC
- Abandoned: 1st century AD

Site notes
- Archaeologists: Lluís Barceló i Bou
- Condition: ruin
- Owner: Generalitat de Catalunya
- Management: Archaeology Museum of Catalonia
- Public access: yes

Castell de la Fosca or Punta del Castell is an ancient Iberian settlement or oppidum sited on a rocky promontory at the north end of the beach called Platja de Castell, about 2 kilometres (1.2 mi) ENE of Palamós (Baix Empordà), on the Costa Brava.

The settlement, which seems to have been inhabited from the 6th century BC to the 1st century AD, was protected by a wall and two square towers. Archaeologists, first in the 1930s and 1940s, and now in a series of excavations begun in 2001, have discovered 64 storage pits and two water cisterns, as well as pottery, amphorae (both locally made and imported), millstones, weights for fishing nets, lamps, agricultural tools and surgical instruments, coins, pieces of bronze, Iberian inscriptions, and the bases of two columns.

== Gallery ==
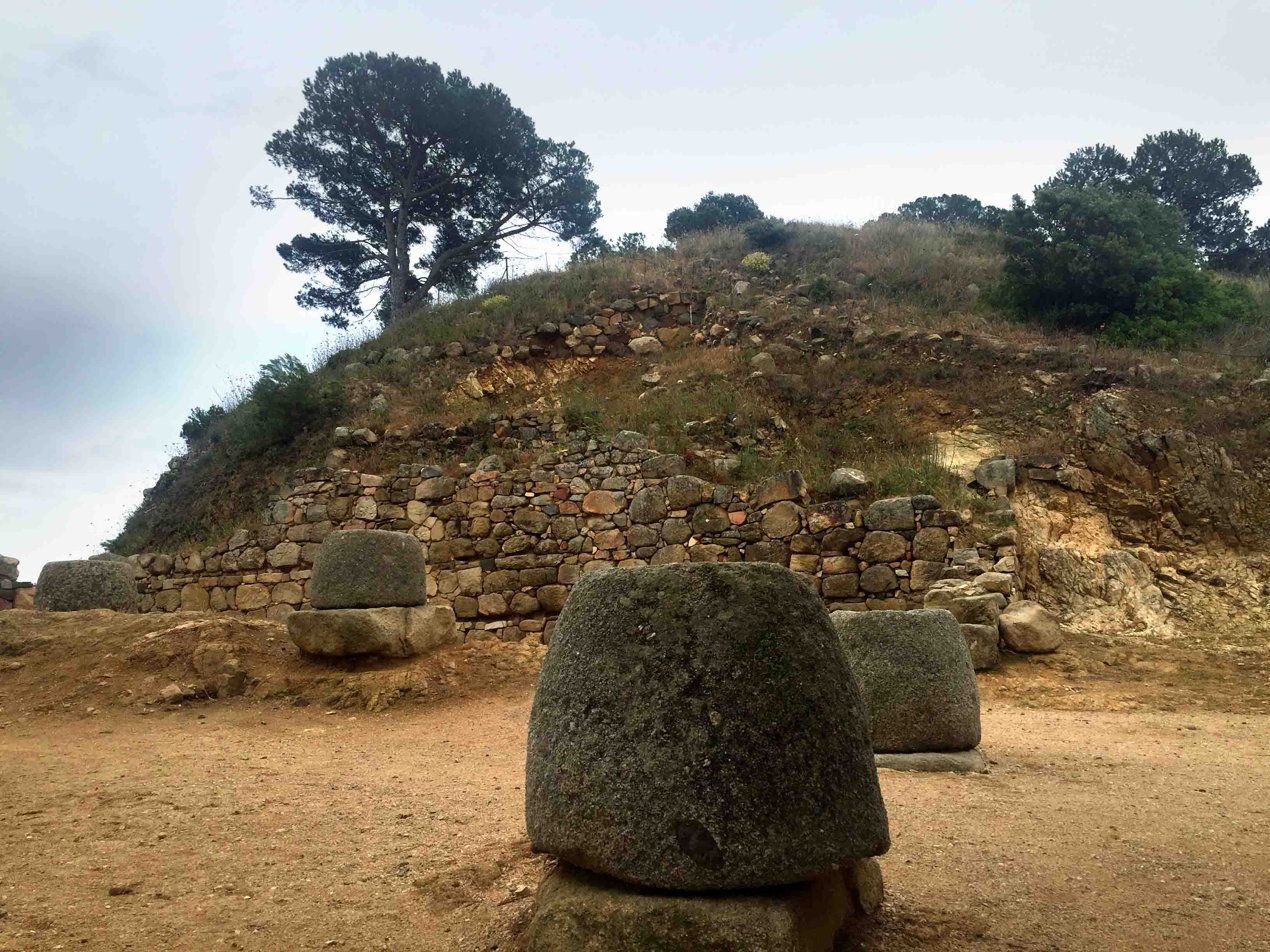
Ruined stone columns

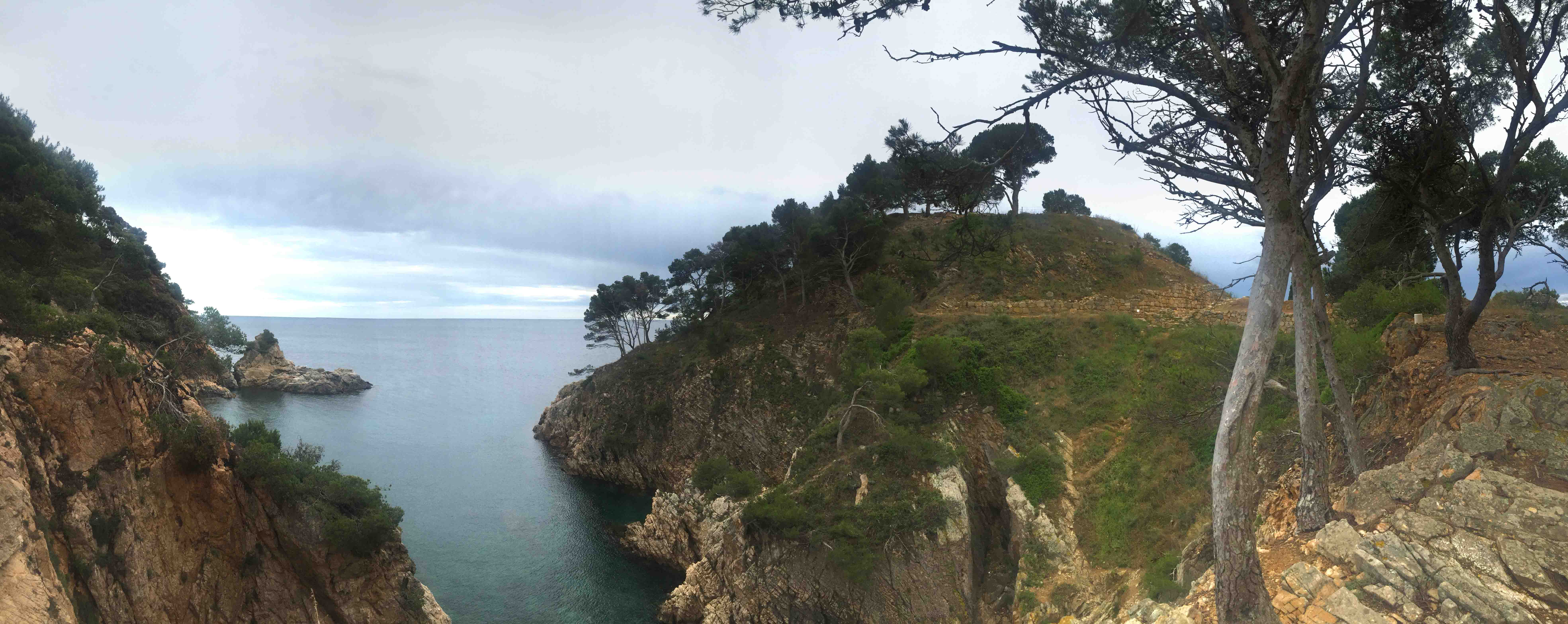
View of the promontory

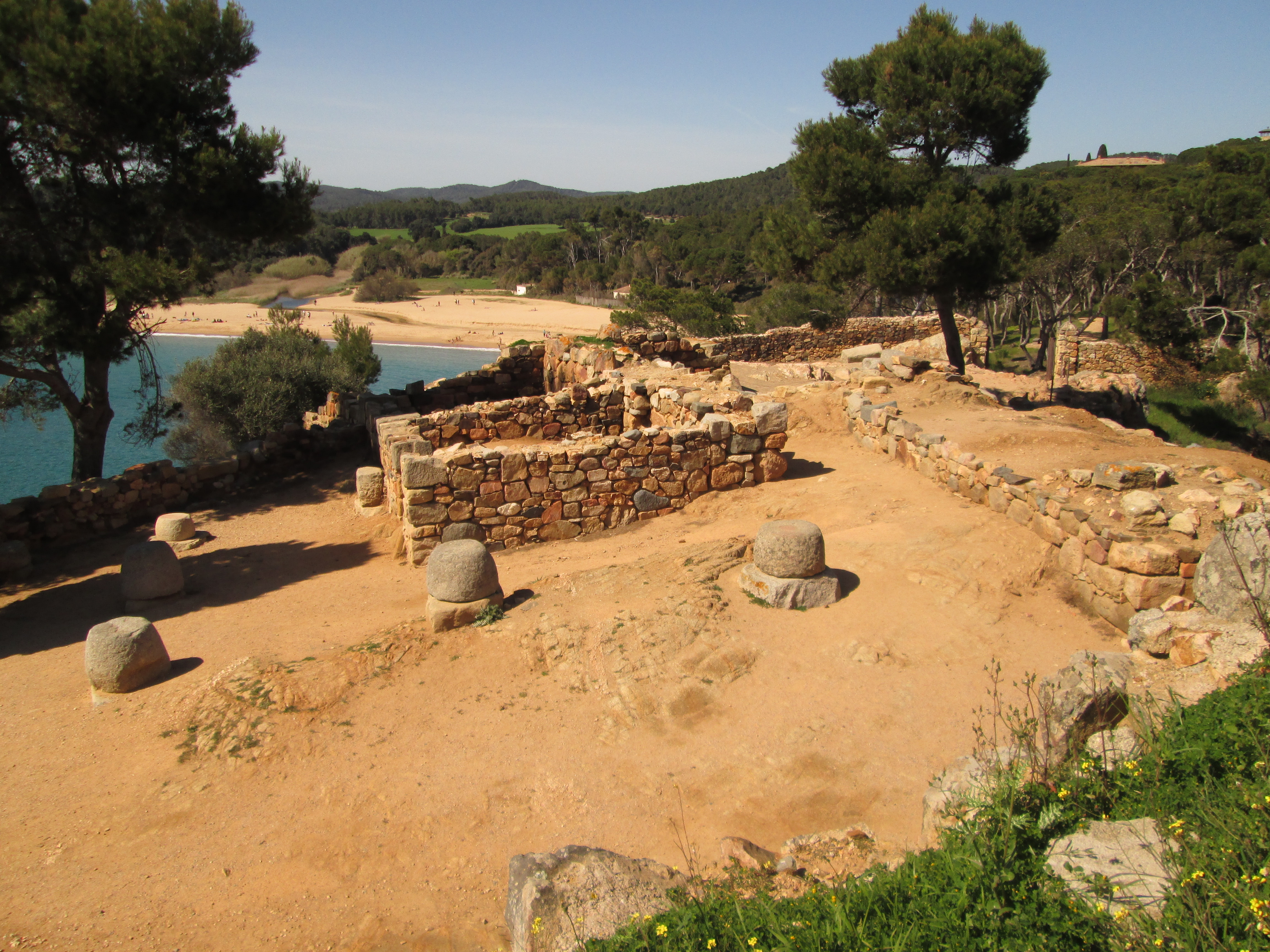
The entrance from Platja de Castell

== See also ==
- Indigetes
